= Congo =

Democratic Republic of the Congo Republic of the Congo The Congo River forms much of the border between these two countries. The Congo Basin comes from the river.

Congo or The Congo most often refers to:

- Congo River, in central Africa
- Congo Basin, the sedimentary basin of the river
- Democratic Republic of the Congo, the larger country to the southeast, sometimes referred to as "Congo-Kinshasa"
- Republic of the Congo, the smaller country to the northwest, sometimes referred to as "Congo-Brazzaville"

Congo or The Congo may also refer to:

== Places ==
=== Africa ===
==== Former colonies ====
- Belgian Congo (modern-day Democratic Republic of the Congo)
- French Congo (modern-day Republic of the Congo)
- Portuguese Congo (modern-day Kabinda, Angola)

==== Other places in Africa ====
- Congo Canyon, a submarine canyon
- Kakongo, former kingdom
- Kingdom of Kongo (1390–1914)
- Kingdom of Kakongo (15th century–1885)
- Congo Free State (1885–1908)
- Republic of the Congo (Léopoldville) or Congo-Léopoldville (1960–1971)
- People's Republic of the Congo (1969–1992)
- M'banza Congo, capital of Zaire Province in Angola
- Kongo, Ghana, town in Ghana
- Kongo, Liberia, small town in Liberia

=== United States ===
- Congo, Alabama
- Congo, Missouri
- Congo, Pennsylvania
- Congo, West Virginia
- Congo Cay, US Virgin Islands

=== Elsewhere ===
- Congo, New South Wales, Australia
- Congo, Paraíba, Brazil
- Congo River (disambiguation), a list of rivers with the name
- Congo Town, a village in Andros Island, Bahamas
- Congo Volcano or Congo Mountain, in Costa Rica

== Languages and ethnic groups ==
- Niger–Congo languages
  - Kongo languages
    - Kongo language, a Bantu language
- Kongo people, a Bantu ethnic group

== Arts and entertainment ==
=== Music ===
- The Congos, a reggae vocal group from Jamaica
  - Congo (album), 1979
- "Congo" (song), by Genesis, 1997
- Kongos (band), a South African American band

=== Other uses in arts, entertainment, and media ===
- Congo (novel), 1980, by Michael Crichton
  - Congo (film), 1995, based on the novel
- Congo (chess variant), using a 7×7 gameboard
- Congo (pinball), 1995, machine
- Congo (TV series), a 2001 nature documentary
- Congo – A Political Tragedy, a 2018 documentary film
- Congo: The Epic History of a People, a 2010 book by David van Reybrouck
- Kongo (film), a 1932 American film

== People ==
- Anwar Congo (born 1937), Indonesian gangster known for involvement in the Indonesian mass killings of 1965–66
- Edwin Congo (born 1976), Colombian footballer
- Louis Congo (fl. 1725), emancipated slave appointed public executioner of French Louisiana
- Richard Congo (born 1961), American basketball player

== Organisations and companies ==
- Conference of NGOs (CoNGO), a membership association of non-governmental organizations
- Congo Airways, the flag carrier of the Democratic Republic of the Congo
- Congo Airlines, a former airline
- Congo LLC, co-owner of Prime Hydration, an American manufacturer of sports drinks

== Other uses ==
- Congo (chimpanzee), which learned how to draw and paint
- Congo (loa), a voodoo spirit
- Congoid, an outdated historical grouping of various people
- HMS Congo (1816), a Royal Navy ship
- Kongo University, in the Democratic Republic of the Congo

== See also ==
- Conga (disambiguation)
- Congolese (disambiguation)
- King Kong (disambiguation)
- Kongo (disambiguation)
- Kongō (disambiguation)
- Kongolo (disambiguation)
