= Kongo =

Kongo may refer to:

== Kongo culture ==
- Kingdom of Kongo
- Kongo cosmogram
- Kongo language or Kikongo, one of the Bantu languages
- Kongo languages
- Kongo people
- Kongo religion

== Places ==
- Kongo, Ghana, a town in Ghana
- Kongo Central, formerly Bas-Congo, a province of the Democratic Republic of the Congo
- M'banza-Kongo, the capital of Angola's northwestern Zaire Province
- Kongo University, in the Democratic Republic of the Congo

== People ==
- Cheick Kongo, French heavyweight mixed martial artist and kickboxer
- Cyril Kongo (also known as Kongo), (born 1969), French painter and graffiti artist
- Kongo Kong (born 1979), American professional wrestler
- Shekie Kongo (born 1949), Malawian boxer

== Arts and entertainment ==
- Kongo (film), a 1932 American pre-Code film directed by William J. Cowen

== See also ==
- Congo (disambiguation)
- Kongō (disambiguation)
- Kongos (disambiguation)
- For ships of this name, see Japanese ship Kongō
  - For the ship classes of this name, see Kongo class (disambiguation)
