= Kongō =

Kongō (Japanese: 金剛) is the Japanese word for vajra. It may refer to:

- Mount Kongō, a mountain in Osaka Prefecture, Japan
  - Kongō Range
- Mount Kongō (Sado), a mountain in Niigata Prefecture, Japan
- Japanese ship Kongō, the name of several Japanese ships
- Kongō (Noh school), a school of Noh acting
- Kongō Masahiro (1948–2014), a Japanese sumo wrestler
- Kongō Station, a railway station in Ōsakasayama, Osaka Prefecture, Japan

== See also ==
- Congo (disambiguation), including Kongo
- King Kong (disambiguation), called 金剛 in Chinese
- 金剛山 (disambiguation)
