= King Corn =

King Corn may refer to:

- King Corn (film), a documentary examining the role of corn farming in American society
- "King Corn" (The West Wing), an episode of the television series The West Wing

== See also ==
- King Kong (disambiguation)
