= Family Stress Model =

Model of effects of economic disadvantage

The Family Stress Model (FSM) posits that economic disadvantage creates economic pressure for caregivers, which has a detrimental effect on their personal mental health, then parenting practices, and hence the well-being of children and adolescents. It grew out of research efforts to understand how economic disadvantage impacts family processes. Researchers like Reuben Hill, an American sociologist, were interested in how the 1930s Great Depression contributed to economic and family stress at that time. In 1994, Rand D. Conger and colleagues proposed the FSM from their work with rural families in Iowa to better understand how economic disadvantage effects child and adolescent outcomes through family processes.

The negative mental health of caregivers then impacts both their parenting practices and increase the chances of interpersonal conflict within caregivers in the family, all of which affects the well-being of children and adolescents. Research has extended and tested the model across different populations by understanding the effects in childhood, adolescence, and over time, thinking beyond the two biological parent family structure, assessing risk and protective factors that mediate multiple links, and considering the role of culture, race, and ethnicity.

== Conger's original model ==
Conger and colleagues proposed the theoretical model for the FSM which linked adverse economic conditions with adolescent internalizing and externalizing problems through family conflict and coercion. The theoretical underpinnings for this model included Leonard Berkowitz’s work in 1989 which outlined how stress and other painful conditions (i.e., economic pressure) are related to an increased emotional arousal or negative affect that varies from despondency to anger (i.e., family conflict and coercion). From this, Conger and colleagues proposed that adverse economic conditions would be associated with economic pressure. Economic pressure would then be directly associated with parent-adolescent financial conflict which, in turn, would be associated with adolescent internalizing and externalizing symptoms. They also predicted that economic pressure would be indirectly associated with marital conflict through an increase in parent depressed mood. Further, they predicted marital conflict would be then directly associated with parent hostility to adolescent which, in turn, would be associated with adolescent internalizing and externalizing behaviors. They also predicted marital conflict would be indirectly associated with parent hostility to adolescent through parent-adolescent financial conflict to then, once again, be associated with adolescent internalizing and externalizing symptoms.

In their early work, Conger and colleagues focused on rural Midwestern families who were experiencing a detrimental economic decline since the 1980s and into the 1990s when Conger and colleagues completed their early research on the FSM. The final sample in their 1994 study included 378 two-parent White families in eight different agricultural and rural Midwest counties who were interviewed for three years starting 1989. The adolescents in the study were seventh graders, 198 girls and 180 boys, and had a sibling within four years of their age. Each year, the families were visited twice by a trained interviewer in their home for about two hours. Across the two visits, both parents and the adolescent completed a set of questionnaires and participated in several different structured interaction tasks that were videotaped and later coded to capture observer-reported parental depressed mood, marital conflict, and parent hostility.

Overall, Conger and colleagues found that adverse economic conditions were associated with family economic pressure. They also found that economic pressure was associated with parent-adolescent financial conflict, as they predicted, but parent-adolescent financial conflict was not directly associated with adolescent internalizing and externalizing symptoms. Rather, parent-adolescent financial conflict was associated with parent hostility to adolescent which, in turn, was associated with adolescent internalizing and externalizing symptoms. They also unexpectedly found that parent depressed mood was directly associated with parent-adolescent financial conflict. As predicted, economic pressure was indirectly associated with marital conflict through parent depressed mood. Marital conflict was then associated with both parent-adolescent financial conflict and parent hostility to adolescent. Once again, it was only parent hostility to adolescent that was associated with adolescent symptoms. Additionally, they did not find evidence of fathers being more affected by economic pressure than mothers and they also did not find gender differences in internalizing and externalizing symptoms across adolescent boys and girls. While this study was instrumental in demonstrating preliminary evidence for the FSM, future research expanded on the FSM to provide stronger longitudinal evidence.

== Expanding the model ==
Since it was first proposed, the FSM had been expanded in several ways by testing: other forms of economic disadvantage and pressure, different forms of caregiver psychology distress beyond depression, interpersonal conflict among caregivers beyond the two biological parent structure, different forms of parenting practices, child and adolescent outcomes beyond internalizing and externalizing symptoms, and finally, risk and protective factors with main and mediating effects at different points of the model. Additionally, there was a push to test the FSM with racially and ethnically diverse families and include culturally relevant factors in the model. However, the key framework of the FSM continues to be that economic disadvantage and pressure predict negative child and adolescent outcomes over time through caregivers’ psychological distress, interpersonal conflict among caregivers, and disrupted parenting with additional risk and protective factors exacerbating and mitigating these links.

== Economic disadvantage and pressure ==
While Family Stress Theory, more broadly, focuses on different sources of stress (e.g., war, divorce or separation, natural disasters) and their impact on families, Conger and colleagues have focused most of their work on economic disadvantage as the source of stress. Economic disadvantage, also referenced as economic hardship or adverse economic conditions, have been defined in distinct ways across research studies. In Conger and colleagues’ 1994 paper, which first proposed FSM, they conceptualized economic disadvantage as family income considerate of household size, as well as experiencing unstable work, trouble at work (e.g., demotions), being laid off, other involuntary losses of work, and debt-to-asset ratio. Since then, economic disadvantage has also been measured with other income-based methods, including living in poverty, or having an annual family income below the federal guidelines and income-needs ratio. Economic disadvantage has also been extended to consider the two other aspects of socioeconomic status, in addition to income, which are parental education and occupation. Unlike income, parental education and income tend to be more consistent. At the same time, socioeconomic status provides further evidence of the family's resources.

There has also been a push to understand how economic disadvantage affects caregiver and parent perceived financial strain, including family economic pressure. In the 1994 paper, Conger and colleagues measured this by asking parents three sets of questions: one, how difficult it was to make ends meet, two, if they had access to resources (i.e., home, clothing, household items, a car, food, medical care, and recreational activities), and three, if they had to make any economic changes to adjust to their financial difficulties, such as cutting back financially. Although some researchers argue that economic pressure is a subjective measure of economic disadvantage, Conger and colleagues argued that measures of economic pressure can also be objective or measurable outcomes (e.g., making financial adjustments due to difficulties). Regardless, research has shown that economic disadvantage is tied economic pressure among White or European American, African American, non-White Hispanic or Latino, and Asian American families living in the United States.

== Impact of economic pressure on caregiver psychological distress ==
Economic pressure, in the form of having a low income-to-needs ratio and experiencing negative financial events, has been found to predict various forms of caregiver psychological distress. This had been found with depressive symptoms, as found by the original Conger and colleagues’ paper, as well as somatization, hostility, feelings of low efficacy, discouragement, hopelessness, anxiety, and overall emotional distress and psychological distress. For example, one longitudinal study with White families found that economic pressure was significantly related to depression, hostility, anxiety, and somatization, but only depression and somatization were related to a future decrease in supportive parenting. Anxiety, on the other hand, was significantly related to a future increase in supportive parenting behaviors. This is crucial because while caregiver psychological distress is the driving factor that impacts both interpersonal conflict among caregivers and parenting, the type of psychological response may be of particular importance.

== Caregiver interpersonal conflict ==
Caregiver psychological distress (e.g., depression, somatization), influenced by economic disadvantage and pressure, has been found to be associated with interpersonal conflict among caregivers. Early research focused on marital or romantic conflict between a couple. In a 2010 longitudinal study, Conger and colleagues found that economic hardship and pressure at Time 1 was positively related to an increase in marital distress from Time 1 to Time 3 through marital conflict at Time 2. With regards to romantic partners, economic hardship and pressure have been found to be positively related to a decrease in relationship quality and stability through an increase in couple emotional (i.e., depression, anxiety, and anger) and behavioral (i.e., substance use and antisocial behavior) problems which were associated with both couple hostility and conflict and withdrawal and distancing.

More recent research has found that economic disadvantage and pressure and psychological distress can have a detrimental effect on non-romantic caregivers and their relationship. For example, a longitudinal study with African American families included primary and secondary caregivers that were not romantically involved and found that caregiver depressive symptoms, predicted by economic pressure, was positively related to caregiver interpersonal conflict. In another longitudinal study with Mexican-origin families, low family income during adolescent mothers’ pregnancy was associated with later maternal depressive symptoms which was, in turn, associated with co-parenting conflict between adolescent mothers and their mothers (i.e., mother-grandmother conflict). Overall, studies have shown that caregiver psychological distress, associated with economic hardship and pressure, is associated with marital conflict, romantic conflict, and non-romantic caregiver conflict.

== Disrupted parenting ==
Like caregiver interpersonal conflict, psychological distress, produced by economic hardship and pressure, has been found to be associated with different forms of disrupted parenting. This includes both an increase in negative parenting practices, such as insensitive, unsupportive, and harsh parenting practices, as well as a decrease in positive parenting practices, such as nurturing, supportive, and warm parenting practices. These links have been seen across different ages from infancy and early childhood into late childhood and middle adolescence. Additionally, caregiver interpersonal conflict has been found to exacerbate disrupted parenting, indicating a bidirectional relationship between caregiver interpersonal conflict and disrupted parenting.

== Child and adolescent outcomes ==
The FSM aims to understand family processes in the context of economic hardship and pressure to ultimately capture how it impacts children and adolescents. More specifically, the FSM provides evidence that family processes (i.e., caregiver interpersonal conflict and disrupted parenting), influenced by caregiver psychological distress produced by economic hardship and pressure, cumulates to effect children and adolescents. These effects include internalizing problems, externalizing problems and conduct disorders, substance use, poor physical health, and school outcomes and behaviors, such as academic performance, unexcused school absences, and school suspension across childhood and adolescence.

One of the early critiques and limitations of the FSM was the lack of longitudinal data to show causal effects; however, several longitudinal studies have shown that economic hardship and pressure impacts child and adolescent outcomes across time through family-related processes. As an example, a study with Mexican-origin families found that family income during the mother's pregnancy was predictive of problem behaviors for the child at five years of age through economic pressure at 10 months, mother's depressive symptoms at two years of age, mother-grandmother co-parenting conflict at three years of age, and experiencing increased daily parenting hassles at four years of age. In another study with African American families, economic stress and pressure in fifth-grade children was predictive of worse child adjustment two years later via caregiver depressive symptoms, caregiver conflict, and disrupted parenting. Together, these studies provide evidence for the long-term detrimental effect economic disadvantage and pressure can have on child and adolescent outcomes.

== Risk and protective factors ==
There are also various individual, family, and community influences that exacerbate or mitigate the family processes that are part of the FSM. This includes parental social support, effective coping strategies like problem solving, sense of optimism, familism values, and neighborhood support. These protective factors have mitigating effects at different parts of the FSM. For example, in a cross-sectional study with African American female primary caregivers, social support was related with decreased maternal depression. In another study, the relationship between economic pressure and husbands’ and wives’ emotional distress was lower for couples with high levels of social support compared to those with low social support. Additionally, the relationship between marital conflict and marital distress was reduced for couples who used effective problem-solving skills compared to those who used ineffective problem-solving skills.

To a lesser extent, research has also found evidence for risk factors; specifically, experiencing greater disadvantage, such as lower income and perceiving high neighborhood adversity. For example, in a study with Mexican-origin families, paternal harshness was associated with an increase in adolescents’ internalizing and externalizing symptoms when parents perceiving low neighborhood adversity or disadvantage. On the other hand, when neighborhood adversity was perceived to be high, parental harshness was related to decreased internalizing and externalizing symptoms. The researchers in this project concluded that harsh parenting may be necessary and important for the adolescent's safety in neighbors with a higher perceived adversity. A recent review called for future studies to continue testing potential risk factors that may have direct or indirect effects on family processes.

== Race, ethnicity and culture ==
Although an early critique of the FSM was its homogeneous use with White or European American families, there is strong evidence the FSM replicates with African American, Hispanic or Latino, and to a lesser extent, Asian American families living in the United States.

In addition to replicating the FSM with racial and ethnic minority families, there have also been efforts to understand how culturally relevant factors impact the FSM. Familism, in particular, has been found to be a protective factor at different points of the FSM for Mexican-origin families. Acculturation stress has been explored as an additional stressor that racial and ethnic minority families experience that, independent and dependent of economic stress, affects child and adolescent outcomes through family processes.
