= Conger (surname) =

Conger is a surname. Notable people with the surname include:

- Abraham Benjamin Conger (1887–1953), American politician and federal judge
- Abraham Bogart Conger (1814–1887), American lawyer, farmer, and politician
- Arthur L. Conger (1872–1951), American US Army colonel and theosophist
- Benn Conger (1856–1922), American businessman, banker and politician
- Clement Conger (1912–2004), American museum curator and public servant
- Darva Conger (born 1965), American reality show contestant
- Dick Conger (1921–1970), American Major League Baseball pitcher
- Edward Augustus Conger (1882–1963), American federal judge
- Edwin H. Conger (1843–1907), American Civil War soldier, lawyer, banker, politician and diplomat
- Everton Conger (1834–1918) American Civil War officer who tracked down and captured assassin John Wilkes Booth
- Hank Conger (born 1988), American Major League Baseball player
- Harmon S. Conger (1816–1882) American politician
- Jack Conger (born 1994), American swimmer
- Jack E. Conger (1921–2006), American World War II Marine Corps fighter ace
- James L. Conger (1805–1876) American lawyer and politician
- Jason Conger (born 1968), American attorney and politician
- John J. Conger (1921–2006), American psychologist
- Lauri Conger (born ?), Canadian keyboardist and songwriter
- Molly Conger, American activist and journalist
- Omar D. Conger (1818–1898) American politician
- Paul S. Conger (1897–1979), American botanist
- Rand Conger (born 1941), American psychologist
- Ray Conger (1904–1994), American middle-distance runner
- Sarah Pike Conger (1843–1932), American writer, friend of controversial Chinese Empress Dowager Cixi
- William Conger (born 1937), American painter and educator
- William F. Conger (1844–1918), American businessman and politician
- Wilson Seymour Conger (1804–1864), Canadian West merchant, railway executive and politician
