= Conger House =

Conger House may refer to the following housed on the US National Register of Historic Places:

- Isaac Conger House, Fayetteville, Tennessee
- J. Newton Conger House, Oneida, Illinois
- Jonathan Clark Conger House, Washington, Iowa
