= Konga (disambiguation) =

Konga is a Swedish locality.

Konga may also refer to:

- Garuda Contingent, the Indonesian peacekeeping contingent
- Konga.com, a Nigerian company that launched in 2012
- Konga (film), a 1961 British science fiction film
- King Konga/Konga the Barbarian, early stage names for professional wrestler The Barbarian (born 1958)

== See also ==
- Clement Wani Konga, Governor of Central Equatoria from 2005 to 2015
- Conga (disambiguation)
- Donkey Konga, a GameCube rhythm video game
- Konga Yo, a 1962 French adventure film
- Kongu (disambiguation)
- Pauline Konga, a retired Kenyan long-distance runner
- Pitcho Womba Konga, a Congolese-Belgian actor
- Rene Konga (born 2002), Cameroonian-Canadian football player
