= Kongos =

Kongos may refer to:

- Kongo people, a Bantu ethnic group who live along the Atlantic coast of Africa from Pointe-Noire (Republic of Congo) to Luanda, Angola.
- Kongos (band), a South African alternative rock/kwaito band.
- John Kongos (born 1945), South African-born singer and songwriter of Greek ancestry

== See also ==
- Congo (disambiguation)
- Kongo (disambiguation)
