= Conger (disambiguation) =

Conger is an eel genus.

Conger may refer to:

== Places ==
=== United States ===
- Conger, Michigan, an unincorporated community
- Conger, Minnesota, a city
- Conger Mountain, Utah

=== Canada ===
- Conger Township, Ontario, Canada
- Conger Range, Nunavut, Canada

=== Elsewhere ===
- Conger Glacier, Antarctica
- Conger Sound, Greenland

== People ==
- Conger (surname)
- Conger Metcalf (1914–1998), American painter

== Other uses ==
- Conger (syndicate), a type of business syndicate
- USS Conger, a US submarine
- A rocket-propelled mine-clearing line charge used by the British Army in 1944–45
- Amphiuma, a genus of aquatic salamanders also known as conger eels

== See also ==
- Conger House (disambiguation)
- Fort Conger, Nunavut, Canada, a former settlement, military fortification, and scientific research post
- Congers, New York
- Konger, a Polish performance art group from Kraków, Poland
