= Kongō Maru-class armed merchantmen =

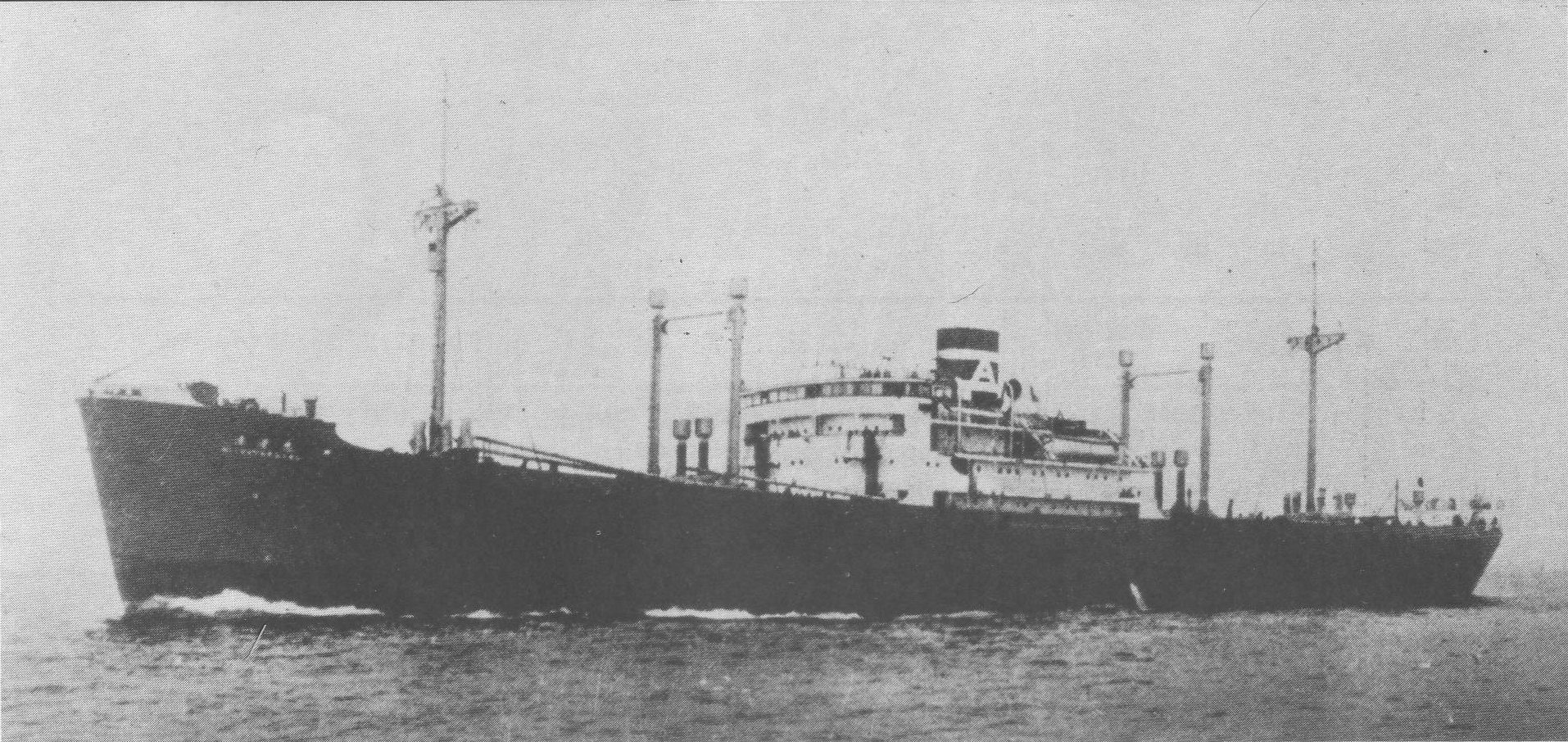
- Kyosumi Maru

Class overview
- Name: Akagi Maru-class auxiliary cruiser
- Builders: Mitsubishi Heavy Industries Nagasaki Shipyard
- Operators: Imperial Japanese Navy
- Built: 1934–1935
- In service: 1935–1944
- In commission: 1941–1944
- Completed: 2
- Lost: 2
- Retired: 0

General characteristics
- Type: Armed merchantmen
- Displacement: 8,600 tonnes (8,464 long tons)
- Length: 139 m (456 ft 0 in)
- Beam: 18.6 m (61 ft 0 in)
- Draft: 9.4 m (30 ft 10 in)
- Propulsion: 1 x Mitsubishi-Sulzer diesel engine (7600-9000hp)
- Speed: 19 knots (22 mph; 35 km/h)
- Complement: 50
- Armament: 4 × 14 cm Type 3; 2 × 13mm Type 92 MG; 2 × 4 533 mm (21.0 in) torpedo tubes
- Aircraft carried: 1×Kawanishi E7K floatplane

The Kongō Maru-class armed merchant cruiser was a class of two armed merchant cruisers of the Imperial Japanese Navy.

== Background ==
The Kongō Maru-class vessels Kongō Maru and Kiyosumi Maru were built by IHI Corporation at Kawasaki shipyard in Kobe as combined cargo-passenger ships. They were converted to "auxiliary cruiser" role in September–December 1941 (and therefore armed).

== Bibliography ==
- Jentschura, Hansgeorg; Jung, Dieter & Mickel, Peter (1977). Warships of the Imperial Japanese Navy, 1869–1945. Annapolis, Maryland: United States Naval Institute. ISBN 978-0-87021-893-4.
