= Kongu =

Kongu may refer to:

- Kongu Nadu, a region in the western part of the Indian state of Tamil Nadu
  - Kongu Tamil, a dialect of Tamil language spoken in Western Tamil Nadu
  - Kongu Vellalar, a caste of Tamil Nadu, India
  - Kongu Express, a train connecting Coimbatore and New Delhi
  - Kongu Engineering College, college in Tamil Nadu, India
  - Kongunadu Makkal Desia Katchi, political party based in Tamil Nadu, India
  - Kongunadu Munnetra Kazhagam, political party based in Tamil Nadu, India
  - Tamil Nadu Kongu Ilaingar Peravai, political party based in Tamil Nadu, India
  - Kongu Chera dynasty, dynasty of ancient India

== See also ==
- Konga (disambiguation)
