= Louisiana (New France) =

District of New France

Coordinates: 40°N 100°W

Colony of Louisiana Colonie de la Louisiane (French)
- District of New France
- 1682–1762; 1801–1803
- Flag (Note: The Royal Banner of early modern France or "Bourbon Flag" was the most commonly used flag in New France) Coat of arms

- French Louisiana in 1803, on a map of the U.S. today.
- Capital: Mobile (1702–1720); Biloxi (1720–1722); La Nouvelle-Orléans (1722–1762)
- Population
  - 1702: 1,500 Europeans (east and west of the Mississippi)
  - 1763: 20,000 Europeans and Africans (west and east of the Mississippi)
  - 1803: 70,000 Europeans and Africans (west of the Mississippi)
  - 1700s: over 1 million Native Americans (west and east of the Mississippi)
  - 1803: over 500,000 Native Americans (west of the Mississippi)
- Government
  - Type: Monarchy
- Historical era: Colonial; French and Indian War; Napoleonic
  - Established: 1682
  - Split west to Spain: 1762
  - Split east to Great Britain: 1763
  - Transfer by Spain: 21 March 1801
  - Louisiana Purchase: 30 April 1803
  - Transferred to the United States: 20 December 1803
- Political subdivisions: Upper Louisiana; Lower Louisiana
Preceded by
Indigenous Americans
Louisiana (New Spain)
Succeeded by
Louisiana (New Spain)
British West Florida
Indian Reserve (1763)
Louisiana Purchase
- Today part of: Canada; United States

Louisiana, (Note: French: Louisiane [lwizjan].) also known as French Louisiana, (Note: Louisiane française [lwizjan fʁɑ̃sɛːz].) was a district of New France. In 1682, the French explorer René-Robert Cavelier, Sieur de la Salle erected a cross and column near the mouth of the Mississippi River and claimed the whole of the drainage basin of the Mississippi River in the name of King Louis XIV, naming it "Louisiana". This land area stretched from near the Great Lakes to the Gulf of Mexico and from the Appalachian Mountains to the Rocky Mountains. The area was under French control from 1682 to 1762 and in part from 1801 to 1803. (Note: A secret treaty was signed in 1800.)

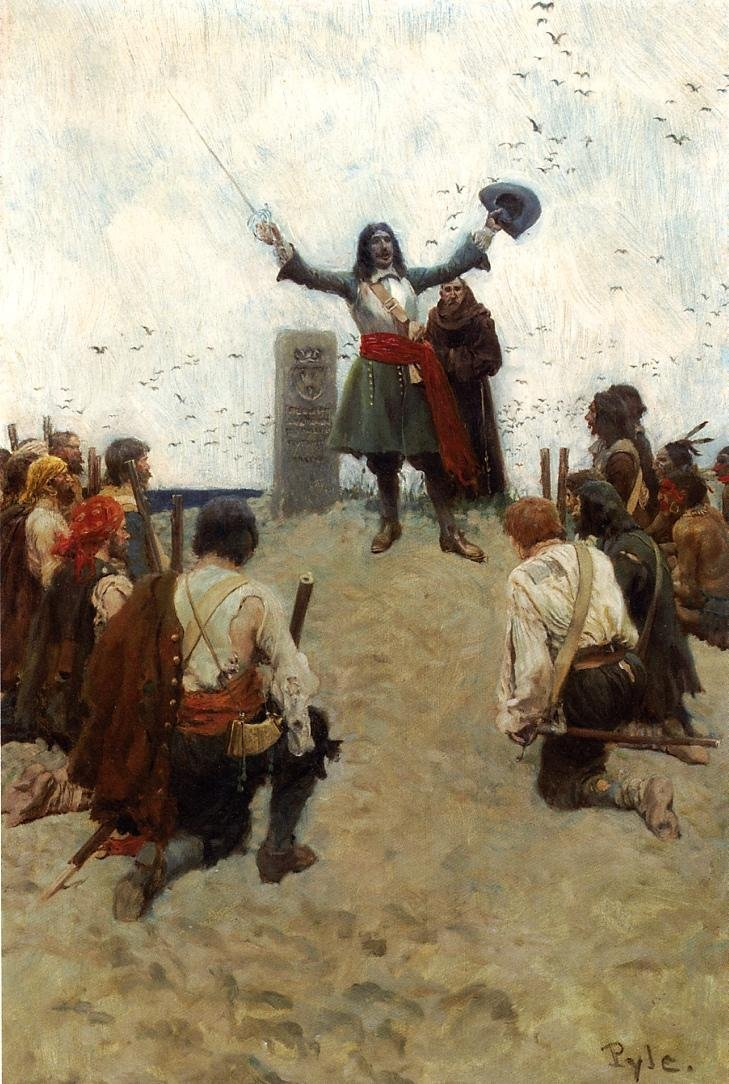
La Salle's erected column and naming "Louisiana" by Howard Pyle

Louisiana included two regions, now known as Upper Louisiana (la Haute-Louisiane), which began north of the Arkansas River, and Lower Louisiana (la Basse-Louisiane). The current U.S. state of Louisiana is named for the historical region, although it comprises only a small portion of the vast lands once claimed by French Louisiana.

French exploration of the area began during the reign of Louis XIV, but the vast territory was not widely settled, due to a lack of human and financial resources. As a result of its defeat in the Seven Years' War, France was forced to cede the east part of the territory in 1763 to the victorious British, and the west part to Spain as compensation for Spain losing Florida. In the 1770s, France decided to aid revolution in Britain's North American colonies, east of the Mississippi, that became the United States. France regained the western half of the territory in the secret Third Treaty of San Ildefonso of 1800. Napoleon Bonaparte made plans to further develop France's control. However, strained by operations in the Caribbean and Europe, he decided to sell the colony to the United States in 1803, ending France's presence in mainland North America. Remnants of France's long tenure are still found, especially in New Orleans and along the Mississippi and its tributaries.

The United States ceded the part north of the 49th parallel to the United Kingdom in the Treaty of 1818. It is part of present-day Alberta and Saskatchewan.

== Boundaries, settlement and geography ==
In the 18th century, Louisiana included most of the Mississippi River basin (see drawing alongside) from what is now the Midwestern United States south to the coast of the Gulf of Mexico. Within this vast territory, only two areas saw substantial French settlement: Upper Louisiana (French: Haute-Louisiane), also known as the Illinois Country (French: Pays des Illinois), which consisted of settlements in what are now the states of Missouri, Illinois, and Indiana; and Lower Louisiana, which comprised parts of the modern states of Louisiana, Arkansas, Mississippi, and Alabama. Both areas were dominated numerically by Native American tribes. At times, fewer than two hundred French soldiers were assigned to all of the colony, on both sides of the Mississippi. In the mid-1720s, Louisiana Indians numbered well over 35,000, forming a clear majority of the colony's population.

Generally speaking, the French colony of Louisiana bordered the Great Lakes, particularly Lake Michigan and Lake Erie towards the north; this region was the "Upper Country" of the French province of Canada. To the east was territory disputed with the thirteen British colonies on the Atlantic seaboard; the French claim extended to the Appalachian Mountains. The Rocky Mountains marked the western extent of the French claim, while Louisiana's southern border was the Gulf of Mexico.

The general flatness of the land aided movement through the territory; its average elevation is less than 1,000 metres (3,300 ft). The topography becomes more mountainous towards the west, with the notable exception of the Ozark Mountains, which are located in the mid-south.

=== Lower Louisiana (Basse-Louisiane) ===
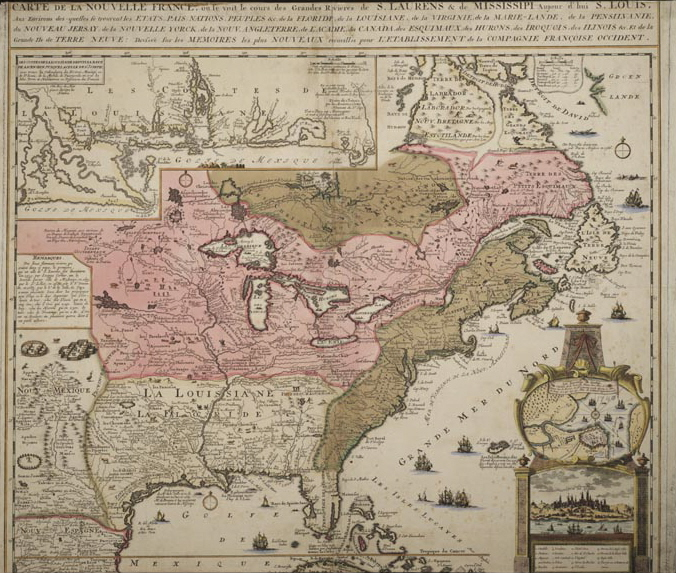
Lower Louisiana marked in yellow; pink represents Canada. Part of Canada below the great lakes was ceded to Louisiana in 1717. Brown represents British colonies. Original map from 1719

Lower Louisiana consisted of lands in the Lower Mississippi River watershed, including settlements in what are now the U.S. states of Arkansas, Louisiana, Mississippi, and Alabama. The French first explored it in the 1660s, and a few trading posts were established in the following years; serious attempt at settlement began with the establishment of Arkansas Post at the confluence of the Arkansas River and Mississippi River in 1686. A more ambitious attempt was made at Fort Maurepas, near modern Biloxi, Mississippi, in 1699. A colonial government soon emerged, with its capital originally at Mobile, later at Biloxi and finally at New Orleans (in 1722, four years after the city's founding). The government was led by a governor-general, and Louisiana became an increasingly important colony in the early 18th century.

The earliest settlers of Upper Louisiana mostly came from French Canada, while Lower Louisiana was colonized by people from all over the French colonial empire, with various waves coming from Canada, France, and the French West Indies.

=== Upper Louisiana (Haute-Louisiane) ===
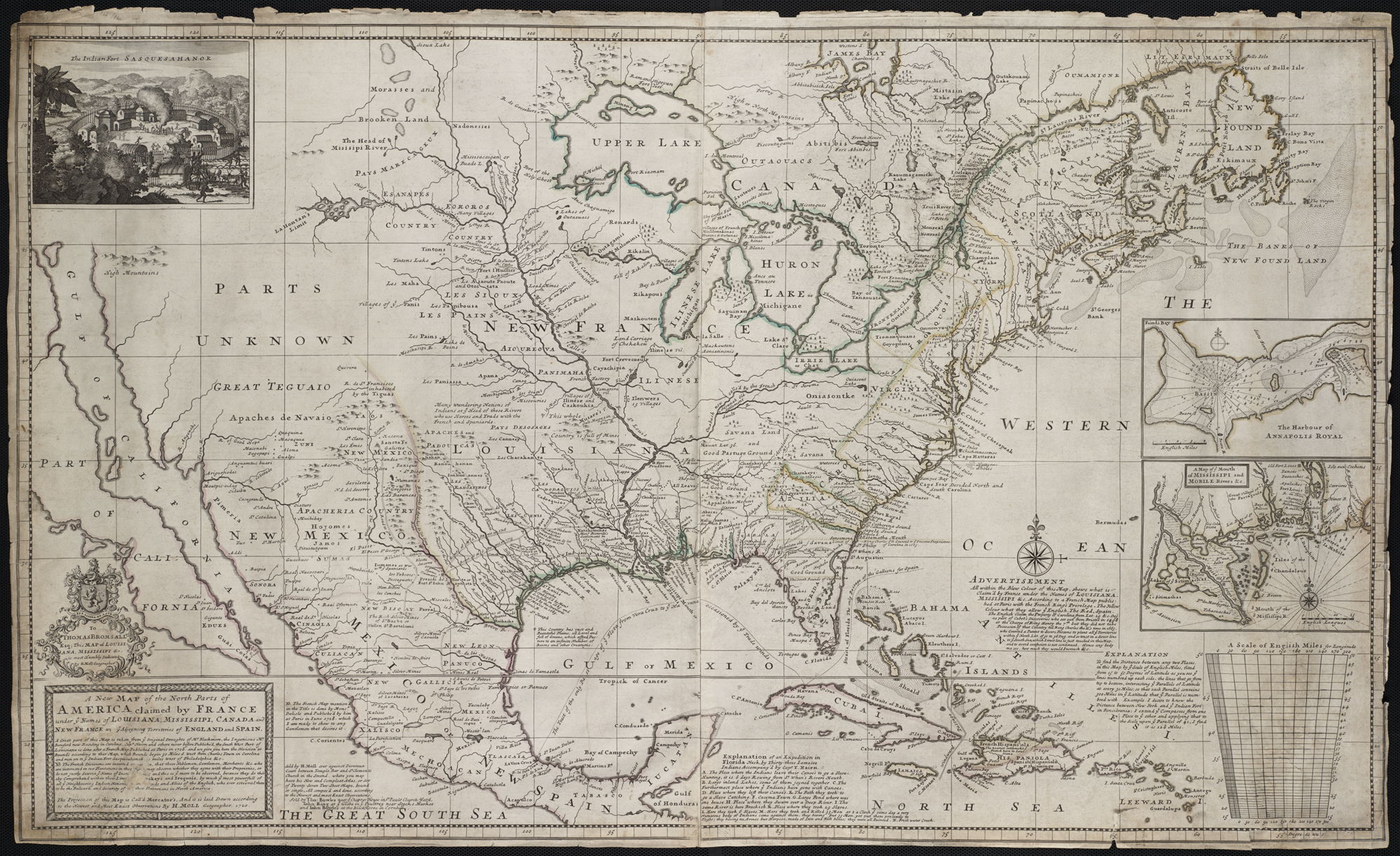
A new map of the north parts of America claimed by France under the names of Louisiana in 1720 by Herman Moll

Upper Louisiana, also known as the Illinois Country, was the French territory in the upper Mississippi River Valley, including settlements and fortifications in what are now the states of Missouri, Illinois, and Indiana. French exploration of the area began with the 1673 expedition of Louis Joliet and Jacques Marquette, which charted the upper Mississippi. As noted above, Upper Louisiana was primarily settled by colonists from French Canada. There was further substantial intermarriage and integration with the local Illinois peoples. French settlers were attracted by the availability of arable farmland as well as by the forests, abundant with animals suitable for hunting and trapping.

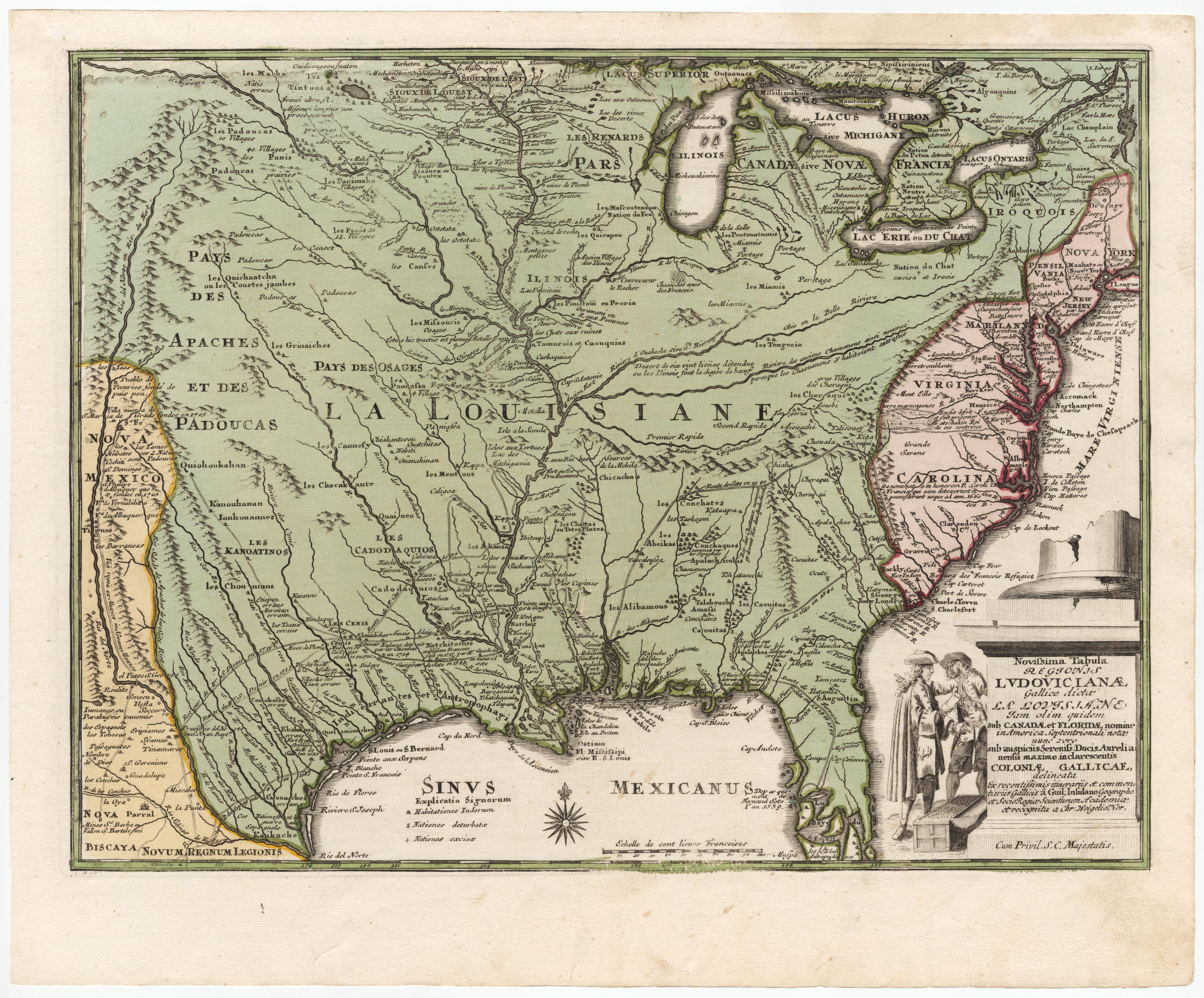
A map of Louisiana by Christoph Weigel, published in 1734

Between 1699 and 1760, six major settlements were established in Upper Louisiana: Cahokia, Kaskaskia, Fort de Chartres, Saint Philippe, and Prairie du Rocher, all on the east side of the Mississippi River in present-day Illinois; and Ste. Genevieve across the river in today's Missouri. The region was initially governed as part of Canada, but was declared to be part of Louisiana in 1712, with the grant of the Louisiana country to Antoine Crozat. By the 1720s a formal government infrastructure had formed; leaders of the towns reported to the commandant of Fort de Chartres, who in turn reported to the governor-general of Louisiana in New Orleans.

The geographical limits of Upper Louisiana were never precisely defined, but the term gradually came to describe the country southwest of the Great Lakes. A royal ordinance of 1722 may have featured the broadest definition of the region: all land claimed by France south of the Great Lakes and north of the mouth of the Ohio River, including both banks of the Mississippi as well as the lower Missouri Valley.

A generation later, trade conflicts between Canada and Louisiana led to a defined boundary between the French colonies; in 1745, Louisiana governor general Vaudreuil set the northeastern bounds of his domain as the Wabash valley up to the mouth of the Vermilion River (near present-day Danville, Illinois); from there, northwest to le Rocher on the Illinois River, and from there west to the mouth of the Rock River (at present-day Rock Island, Illinois). Thus, Vincennes and Peoria were the limit of Louisiana's reach. The outposts at Ouiatenon (on the upper Wabash near present-day Lafayette, Indiana), Fort Miamis (near present-day Fort Wayne, Indiana), and Prairie du Chien operated as dependencies of Canada.

This boundary remained in effect through the capitulation of French forces in Canada in 1760 until the Treaty of Paris in 1763, after which France surrendered its remaining territory east of the Mississippi to Great Britain. (Although British forces had occupied the "Canadian" posts in the Illinois and Wabash countries in 1761, they did not occupy Vincennes or the Mississippi River settlements at Cahokia and Kaskaskia until 1764, after the peace treaty was ratified.) As part of a general report on conditions in the newly conquered Province of Canada, Gen. Thomas Gage (then commandant at Montreal) explained in 1762 that, although the boundary between Louisiana and Canada was not exact, it was understood that the upper Mississippi (above the mouth of the Illinois) was in Canadian trading territory.

Map of New France (blue color) in 1750, before the French and Indian War (1754 to 1763), that was part of the Seven Years' War

Following the transfer of power (at which time many of the French settlers on the east bank of the Mississippi crossed the river to what had become Spanish Louisiana) the eastern Illinois Country became part of the British Province of Quebec, and later the United States' Northwest Territory. French colonists who migrated after they lost control over New France founded outposts such as the important settlement of St. Louis (1764). This became a French fur-trading center, connected to trading posts on the Missouri and Upper Mississippi rivers, leading to later French settlement in that area.

In the 1762 Treaty of Fontainebleau, France ceded Louisiana west of the Mississippi River to Spain, its ally in the war, as compensation for the loss of Spanish Florida to Britain. Even after France had lost its claim to Louisiana, francophone settlement of Upper Louisiana continued for the next four decades. French explorers and frontiersmen, such as Pedro Vial, were often employed as guides and interpreters by the Spanish and later by the Americans. The Spanish lieutenant governors at St. Louis maintained the traditional "Illinois Country" nomenclature, using titles such as "commander in chief of the western part and districts of Illinois" and administrators commonly referred to their district capital St. Louis "of the Ylinuses".

In 1800 Spain returned its part of Louisiana to France in the Third Treaty of San Ildefonso, but France sold it to the United States in the Louisiana Purchase of 1803. Through this time, but especially following the Louisiana Purchase, French Creoles, as they called themselves, began to move further into the Missouri Ozarks, where they formed mining communities such as Mine à Breton and La Vieille Mine (Old Mines).

A unique dialect, known as Missouri French, developed in Upper Louisiana. It is distinguished from both Louisiana French and the various forms of Canadian French, such as Acadian. The dialect continued to be spoken around the Midwest, particularly in Missouri, through the 20th century. It is nearly extinct today, with only a few elderly speakers still able to use it.

== History ==
Historical affiliations

French Empire 1718–1763
Spanish Empire 1763–1802
French Republic 1802–1803
United States of America 1803–1861
Confederate States of America 1861–1865
United States of America 1862–present

=== Exploration of Louisiana ===
==== 17th-century explorers ====
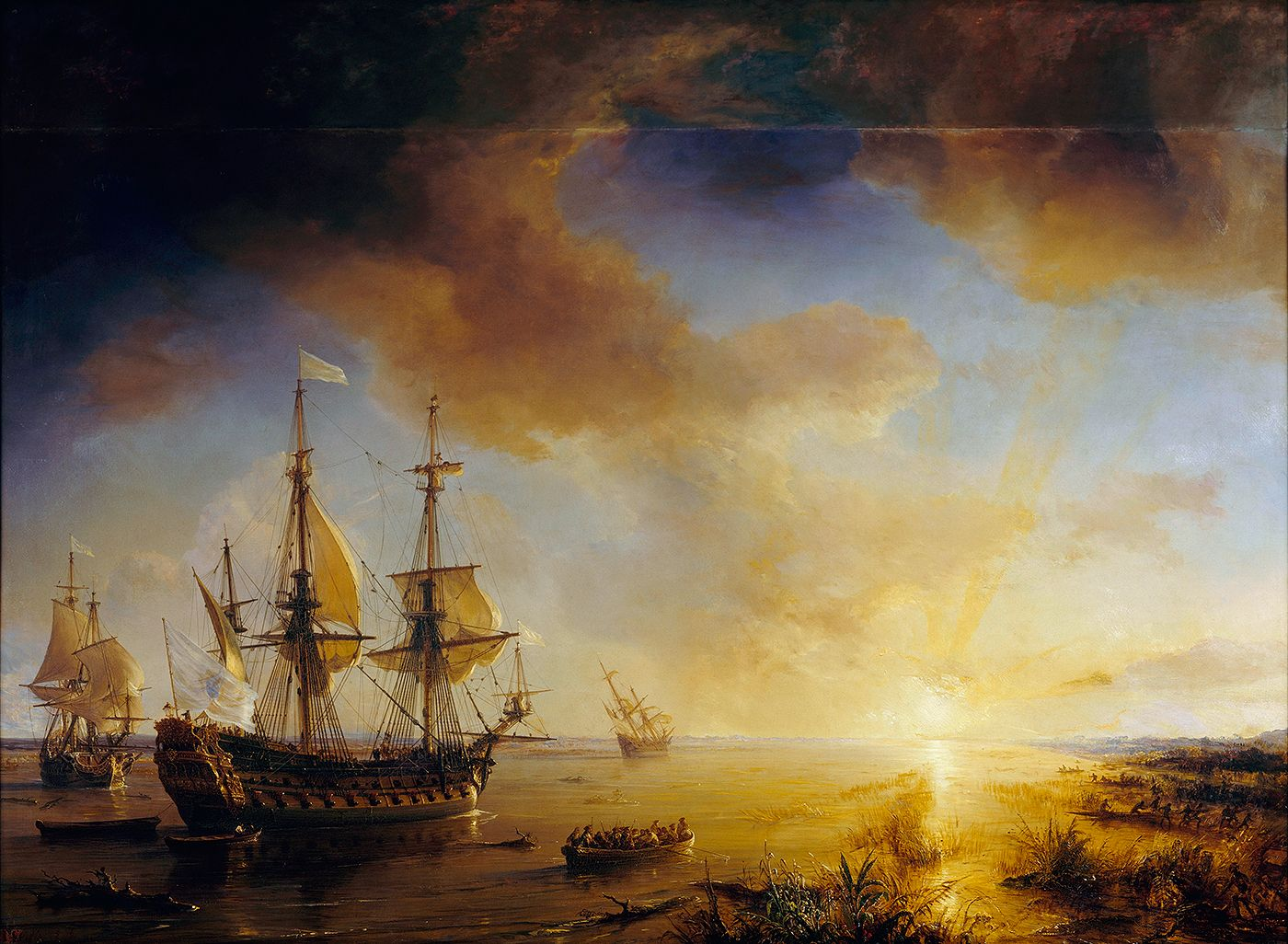
Painting by Theodore Gudin titled La Salle's Expedition to Louisiana in 1684. The ship on the left is La Belle, in the middle is Le Joly, and L'Aimable is to the right. They are at the entrance to Matagorda Bay

In 1660, France started a policy of expansion into the interior of North America from what is now eastern Canada. The objectives were to locate a Northwest Passage to China; to exploit the territory's natural resources, such as fur and mineral ores; and to convert the native population to Catholicism. Fur traders began exploring the pays d'en haut (upper country around the Great Lakes) at the time. In 1659, Pierre-Esprit Radisson and Médard Chouart des Groseilliers reached the western end of Lake Superior. Priests founded missions, such as the Mission of Sault Sainte Marie in 1668. On May 17, 1673, Louis Jolliet and Jacques Marquette began the exploration of the Mississippi River, which they called the Sioux Tongo (the large river) or Michissipi. They reached the mouth of the Arkansas River, and then returned upstream, having learned that the great river ran toward the Gulf of Mexico, not toward the Pacific Ocean as they had presumed. In 1675, Marquette founded a mission in the Native American village of Kaskaskias on the Illinois River. A permanent settlement was made by 1690.

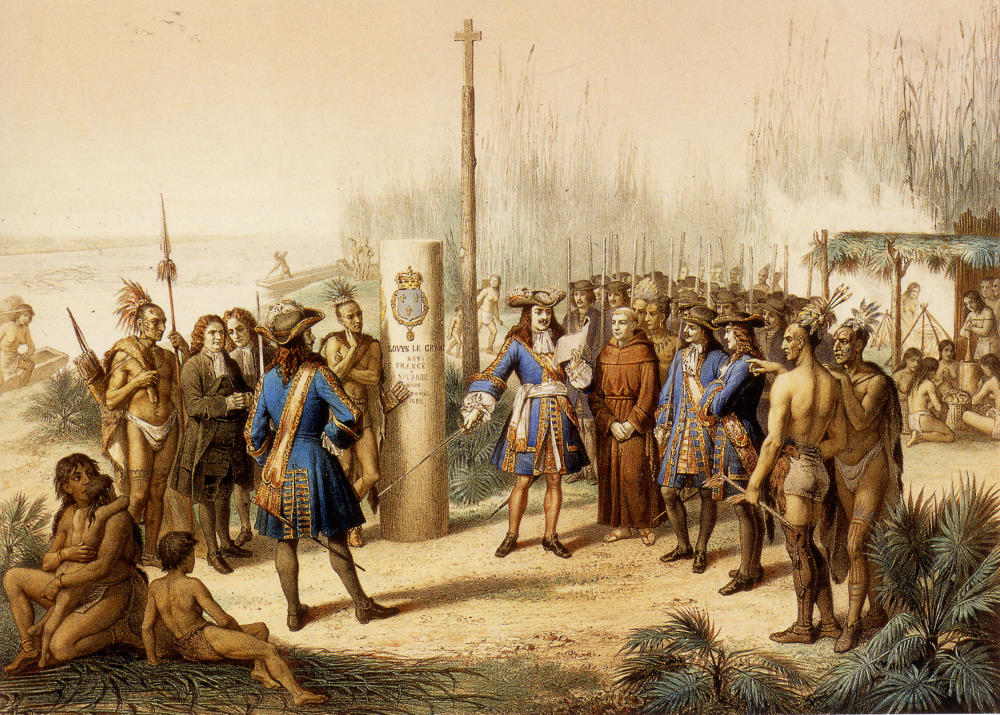
Claiming Louisiana for France in 1682

In 1682, René-Robert Cavelier, Sieur de La Salle and the Italian Henri de Tonti descended to the Mississippi River Delta. They left Fort Crèvecoeur on the Illinois River, accompanied by 23 Frenchmen and 18 Indians. They built Fort Prud'homme (later the city of Memphis) and claimed French sovereignty on the whole of the valley, which they called Louisiane in honor of the French king, Louis XIV. They sealed alliances with the Quapaw Indians. In April 1682, they arrived at the mouth of the Mississippi. La Salle eventually returned to Versailles, where he convinced the Minister of the Marine to grant the command of Louisiana to him. He claimed that Louisiana was close to New Spain by drawing a map showing the Mississippi as much farther west than it really was, which seems to have been an honest mistake given that he would later search for the river further to the west of its actual location.

With four ships and 320 emigrants, La Salle set sail for Louisiana on 1 August 1684. La Salle did not find the river's mouth in the Mississippi River Delta and established a short-lived colony on the Texas coast. La Salle was assassinated in 1687 by members of his party, reportedly near what is now Navasota, Texas.

=== Summary chronology ===
- 1673: The Frenchmen Louis Jolliet and Jacques Marquette begin to explore the Mississippi River from the north and determine that it must run into the Gulf of Mexico on the south.
- 1675: Marquette founds a mission at the Grand Village of the Illinois.
- 1680: Fort Crevecoeur founded in the Illinois Country
- 1682: René-Robert Cavelier, Sieur de la Salle, descends the Mississippi to its mouth on the Gulf of Mexico.
- 1682: Fort St. Louis du Rocher on the Illinois River is founded
- 1685–88: La Salle attempts to establish a colony on the Gulf of Mexico to secure the entire river valley for France. He establishes a camp at Fort Saint Louis; but his mission fails, in part because he fails to rediscover the Mississippi's mouth.
- 1686: Henri de Tonti establishes Arkansas Post, a trading post at the site of a Quapaw Indian village, near where the Arkansas River meets the Mississippi.
- 1696: Cahokia village in Illinois Country is settled.
- 1699: Pierre Le Moyne, Sieur d'Iberville explores the Louisiana coast and founds Fort Maurepas at Old Biloxi (now in Mississippi) on the Gulf of Mexico.
- 1701: Antoine Laumet de La Mothe founds Detroit.
- 1702: In January, Jean-Baptiste Le Moyne, Sieur de Bienville founds Mobile (now in Alabama) as the capital of Louisiana for his brother Iberville.
- 1703: Kaskaskia village in Illinois Country is settled
- 1713: Étienne de Veniard, Sieur de Bourgmont publishes the first report on explorations of the Missouri River.
- 1714: Louis Juchereau de St. Denis founds Natchitoches, the oldest permanent settlement in what is now the State of Louisiana.
- 1716: Fort Rosalie is established on a bluff overlooking the Mississippi River; the settlement became the town of Natchez.
- 1717: Illinois Country is detached from Canada to be governed by Louisiana (Haute-Louisiane).
- 1718: New Orleans is founded, at a crescent in the river, for protection against flooding.
- 1719: The first ships bringing black slaves from Africa arrive at Mobile, Alabama.
- 1720: Biloxi (in the future state of Mississippi) becomes capital of French Louisiana.
- 1720: Fort de Chartres is established as the administrative center of the Illinois Country.
- 1720: Pawnees destroy the Spanish Villasur expedition near Columbus, Nebraska, effectively ending Spanish incursions into the territory until 1763.
- 1723: New Orleans becomes the official capital of French Louisiana.
- 1723: Fort Orleans is established near Brunswick, Missouri.
- 1732: Vincennes is established on the Wabash River in the Illinois Country (Upper Louisiana).
- 1735: Sainte-Geneviève in the Illinois Country (Upper Louisiana) is founded.
- 1755: British authorities begin expelling French settlers from the former colony of Acadia (now Nova Scotia); many migrate to the southernmost parts of Louisiana, where they become the Cajuns.
- 1762: France secretly cedes Louisiana to Spain in the Treaty of Fontainebleau (1762).
- 1763: France cedes Canada and Louisiana east of the Mississippi to Great Britain in the Treaty of Paris. The rest of Louisiana, including New Orleans, is formally ceded to Spain and incorporated as Luisiana or Spanish Louisiana into the Spanish Empire.
- 1764: Pierre Laclède founds St. Louis, Missouri.
- 1764: The terms of the Treaty of Fontainebleau are revealed.
- 1768: In the Rebellion of 1768, Creole and German settlers force the new Spanish governor to flee.
- 1769: Spain quells the rebellion, executes the leaders and officially takes possession, imposing Spanish law.
- 1778: France declares war on Great Britain, in support of the American Revolution.
- 1779: Spain declares war on Great Britain.
- 1783: The Treaty of Paris officially ends hostilities between the U.S., with its French and Spanish allies, and Great Britain.
- 1788: The Great New Orleans Fire (1788) destroys most of New Orleans, which is subsequently rebuilt in Spanish style.
- 1793: Spain declares war on the French Republic in the French Revolutionary Wars.
- 1795: France defeats Spain in the War of the Pyrenees, ended by the Second Treaty of San Ildefonso.
- 1800: Spain agrees to transfer Louisiana to France in the secret Third Treaty of San Ildefonso.
- 1801: The Treaty of Aranjuez stipulated the cession of Louisiana from Spain to France to be a "restoration", not a retrocession. As France had never given any part of Florida to Spain, Spain could not give it back.
- 1803: Napoleon Bonaparte sells Louisiana to the United States, a few weeks after sending a prefect to New Orleans to assume control.
- 1803: In New Orleans, Spain officially transfers (Lower) Louisiana to France in November. Three weeks later, in December, France officially cedes it to the United States.
- 1804: In St. Louis in March, Three Flags Day, Spain officially transfers Upper Louisiana to France, which then officially cedes it to the United States.

== Political and administrative organization ==
It was not easy for an absolute monarchy to administer Louisiana, a territory several times larger than European France. Louis XIV and his successors tried to impose their absolutist ambitions on the colony, often without giving the colonial administration enough financial means to do its work.

=== Absolutism ===
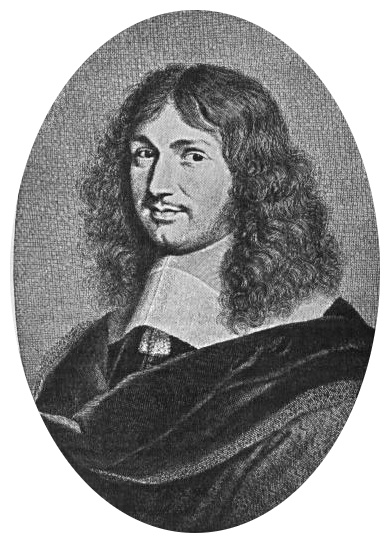
Jean-Baptiste Colbert

If the leaders of Ancien Régime took control of, and sometimes encouraged, the colonization of New France, it was for many reasons. The reign of Henry IV gave an important impetus to the colonisation of New France. Henry IV, the first Bourbon king, was personally interested in foreign affairs. In the 17th century, the ministers Richelieu and later Colbert advanced colonial politics. Louis XIV and his ministers were worried about the size of the kingdom, over which they constantly competed with other European nations. European rivalry and a game of political alliances greatly marked the history of Louisiana, in direct and indirect ways. Within those shifting conditions, the French desire to limit British influence in North America was a constant issue in royal politics.

Louis XIV took care to limit the appearance of intermediary bodies and countervailing powers in North America. He did not want an assembly of notables or parliament. In the 1660s, the colony was royal property. In 1685, Louis XIV banned all publishing in New France. Between 1712 and 1731, the French possession came under the control of Antoine Crozat, a rich businessman, then under that of the Mississippi Company (created by John Law), which recruited immigrants to settle the colony. In 1731, Louisiana reverted to royal rule.

In contrast to Metropolitan France, the government applied a single unified law of the land: the Custom of Paris for civil law (rather egalitarian for the time); the "Code Louis", consisting of the 1667 ordinance on civil procedure and 1670 ordinance on criminal procedure; the 1673 "Code Savary" for trade; and the 1685 Code noir for slavery. This served as an equaliser for a while; riots and revolts against authority were rare. But, the centralised government had difficulty maintaining communications over the long distance and sailing time that separated France from Louisiana. Toward the end of the 17th century and the beginning of the 18th, the colonists on the Gulf of Mexico were left almost completely to fend for themselves; they counted far more on the assistance of the Native Americans than on France. The distance had its advantages: the colonists smuggled goods into the colony with impunity.

Jean-Baptiste Colbert, Louis XIV's Minister of the Navy and Trade, was eager to stuff the coffers of the Crown. He dissolved the trading companies and took care to increase the production of the country and the colonies. Being a mercantilist, he believed it was necessary to sell as much as possible and to reduce reliance on imports. He imposed a French monopoly on trade. Colbert wanted to reduce the expenditure of the monarchy. It was, however, necessary to invest much money and to mobilize important human resources retain the American colony. Much work was done on the economic infrastructure (factories, ports) in metropolitan France, but the investment was not enough in Louisiana. No plan to facilitate the movement of goods or men was ever carried out. The French budget was exhausted because of the wars in Europe, but the colonists in Louisiana did not have to pay royal taxes and were free of the hated gabelle.

=== Colonial administration ===
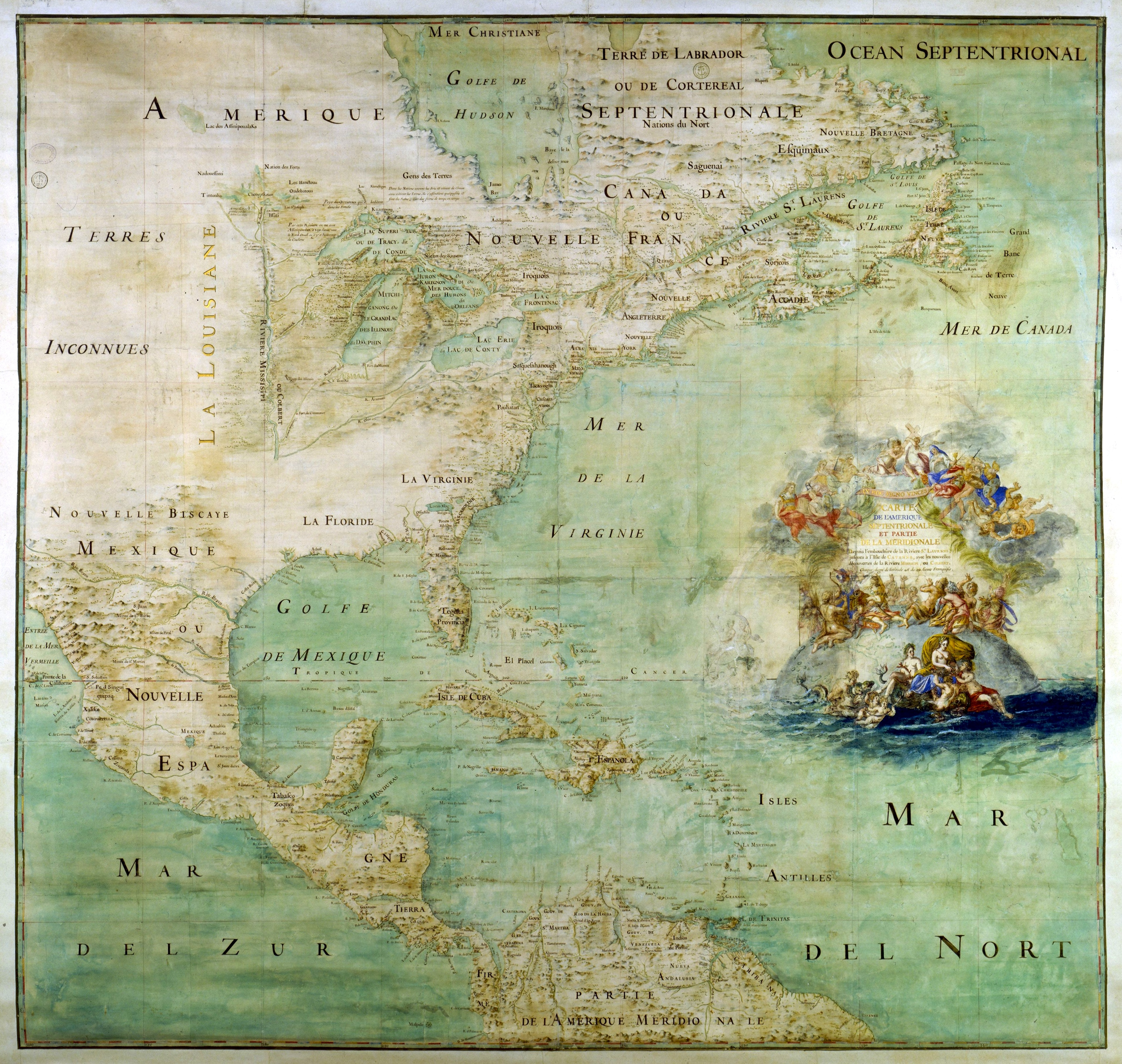
Map of North America during the 17th century

Under the Ancien Régime, Louisiana formed part of a larger colonial unit, French American territory—New France (Nouvelle France), which included a large part of modern-day Canada. New France was initially ruled by a viceroy in 1625, the Duke of Ventadour. The colony was then given a government like the Bourbons' other possessions. Its capital was Quebec City until 1759. A governor-general, assisted by a single intendant, was charged with ruling this vast region. In theory, Louisiana was subordinate to Canada, and so it was explored and settled chiefly by French-Canadians rather than colonists from France. Given the enormous distance between New Orleans and Quebec, communications outside cities and forts were limited.

French settlements were widely dispersed, which afforded them de facto autonomy. The government decided to break up governance of the vast varied colony of New France into five smaller provinces, including Louisiana. The Illinois Country, south of the Great Lakes, was added to Louisiana in 1717 and became known as Upper Louisiana. Mobile served as French Louisiana's first "capital". The seat of government moved to Biloxi in 1720, and then to New Orleans in 1722, where the governor lived. While the office of governor general was the most eminent, it was not the most powerful. His was a military position that required him to lead the troops and maintain diplomatic relations. The second provincial authority was the commissaire-ordonnateur. His was a civil post with similar functions as that of the intendants in France: the king's administrator and representative, he oversaw justice, the police force, and finances. He managed the budget, set prices, presided the Superior Council (Conseil supérieur—the court of justice), and organized the census. Appointed by the king, Louisiana's commissaire-ordonnateur had broad powers that sometimes conflicted with those of the governor general. The military outposts of the hinterland were directed by commanders.

According to one account, at the time of the transfer to the United States, "the province was divided as follows: Mobile from the Balize to the city, New Orleans and the country on both sides of Lake Pontchartrain, first and second German coasts, Catahanose, Fourche, Venezuela, Iberville, Galveztown, Baton Rouge, Point Coupee, Attakapas, Opelousas, Ouachita, Avoyelles, Rapides, Natchitoches, Arkansas and the Illinois. These were all military posts or separate commands, and were separated from each other by leagues of forest. The only communication was by water."

== Religious establishment ==
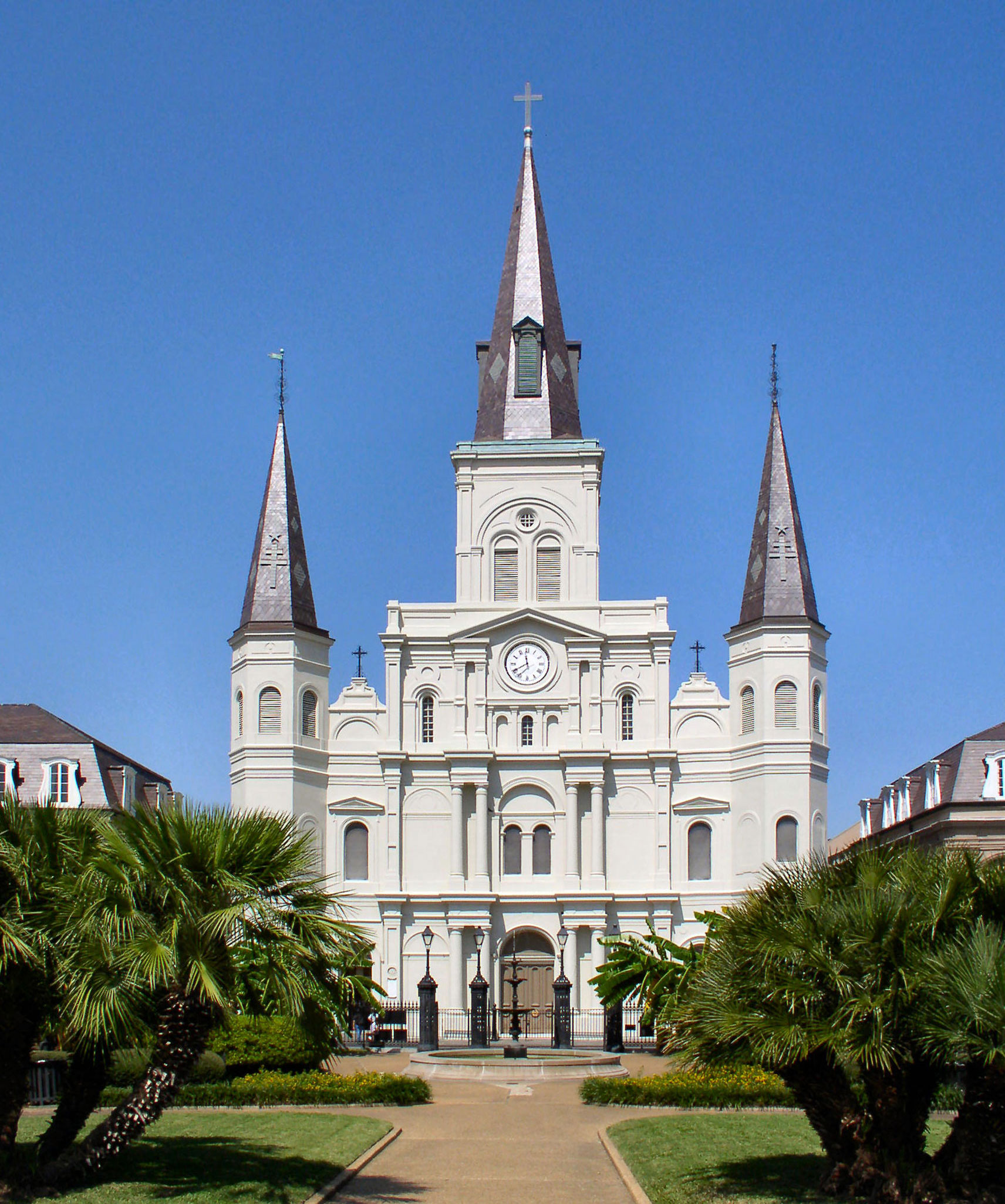
Saint Louis Cathedral in New Orleans

The French possessions of North America were under the authority of a single Catholic diocese, whose seat was in Quebec. The archbishop, named and paid by the king, was spiritual head of all New France. With loose religious supervision, the fervor of the population was very weak; Louisianans tended to practice their faith much less than did their counterparts in France and Canada. The tithe, a tax by the clergy on the congregations, produced less revenue than in France.

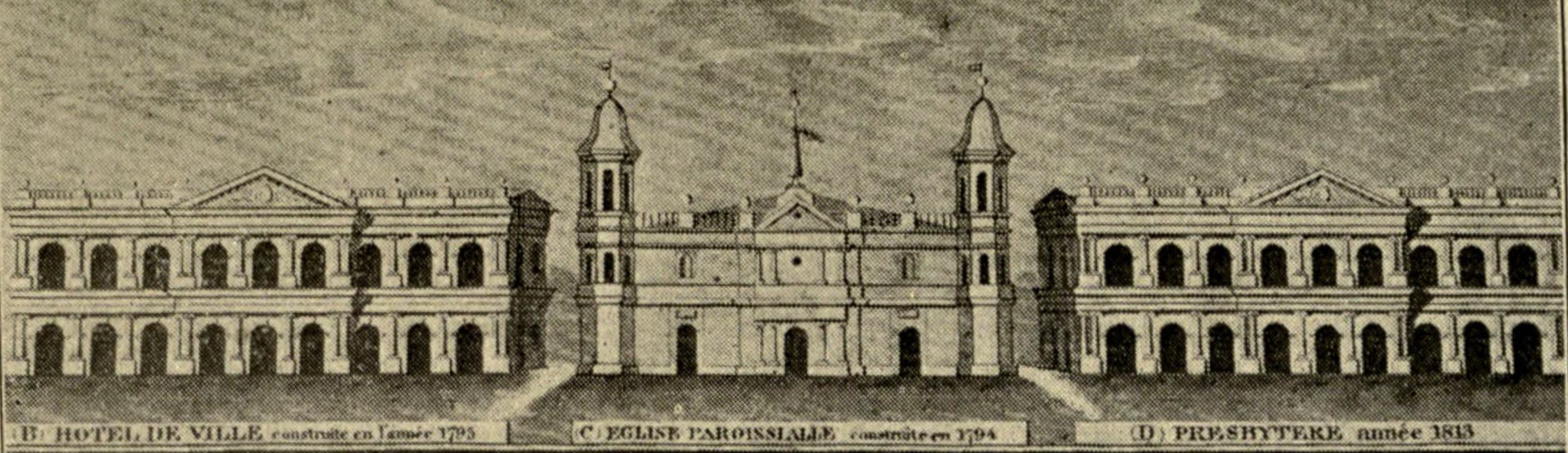
Saint Louis Cathedral in New Orleans in 1815

The Church nevertheless played an important part in the exploration of French Louisiana; it sent missions, primarily carried out by Jesuits, to convert Native Americans. It also founded schools and hospitals: By 1720, the Ursulines were operating a hospital in New Orleans. The church and its missionaries established contact with the numerous Amerindian tribes. Certain priests, such as Father Marquette in the 17th century, took part in exploratory missions. The Jesuits translated collections of prayers into numerous Amerindian languages to convert the Native Americans. They also looked for ways to relate Indian practices to Christian worship, and helped show the Natives how these were related. A syncretic religion developed among new Christians. Sincere and permanent conversions were limited in number; many who received missionary instruction tended to assimilate the Holy Trinity into their belief of "spirits", or rejected the concept outright.

== Colonial society ==
It is difficult to estimate the total population of France's colonies in North America. While historians have relatively precise sources regarding the colonists and enslaved Africans, estimates of Native American peoples is difficult. During the 18th century, the society of Louisiana became quite creolized.

=== Language ===
Colonial French (commonly known as Colonial Louisiana French) is a variety of Louisiana French. It is associated with the Cajun French dialect and with Louisiana Creole French, a related creole language.

Colonial French is conventionally described as the form of French spoken in Lower Louisiana prior to the mass arrival of Acadians after the Great Upheaval of the mid-18th century, which resulted in the birth of the Cajun dialect. The prestige dialect still used by Creoles and Cajuns is often identified as deriving from Colonial French, but some linguists differentiate between the two, referring to the latter as Plantation Society French. Historically spoken by Louisiana Creole population in Lower Louisiana, Colonial French is generally considered to have been adopted by both whites and blacks.

Following the Great Upheaval in 1764, when many Acadians were exiled to French Louisiana, Louisiana French was adopted by the Acadians. Some scholars suggested that it survived as the prestige dialect spoken by Creoles, both white and of color, into the 21st century. There are populations of Creoles and Cajuns among other ethnic groups in the parishes of St. Martin, Avoyelles, Iberia, Pointe-Coupée, St. Charles, St. Landry, St. Mary, St. Tammany, Plaquemines, and other parishes south of Orleans, that still speak this prestige dialect.

However, linguists have pointed out this prestige dialect is distinct from the pre-Upheaval Colonial French, and is largely derived from the standard French of the mid-19th century, Spanish, African languages, and Native American languages. As such, in 1998 linguist Michael Picone of the University of Alabama introduced the term "Plantation Society French" for the prestige dialect. There is a history of diglossia between Plantation Society French and Louisiana Creole French. Plantation Society French, at any rate, is quite close to the Standard French of the time of its origin, with some possible differences in pronunciation and vocabulary use.

French is still spoken by the Louisiana Indians, such as the Houmas, Avoyelles, Choctaw, and other tribal remnants, all present in pre-Acadian Louisiana and still residing in the state.

=== Native Americans ===
According to the demographer Russel Thornton, North America contained approximately seven million native inhabitants in 1500. The population plummeted from the 16th century onward, primarily because of the new infectious diseases carried by Europeans, to which the Native Americans had no acquired immunity. At the end of the 17th century, there were likely no more than 100,000 to 200,000 Native Americans in Lower Louisiana. French colonists forced a small number of Native Americans into slavery, in spite of official prohibition. These slaves were persons who had been captured by rival tribes during raids and in battle, and sold to French colonists. At the time, many were sent to Saint Domingue in the West Indies for sale as slaves, or to Canada. In Louisiana, planters generally preferred using African slaves, though some had Native American servants.

=== Enslaved Africans ===
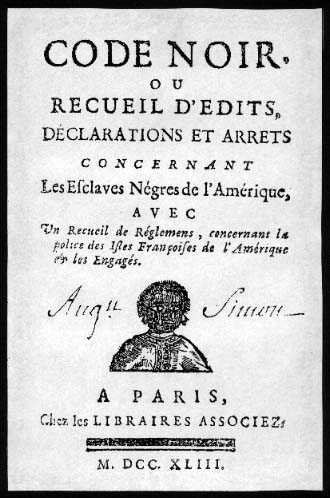
The Code Noir, which was applied in Louisiana during the 18th century and, later, with some modifications, in the West Indies

In 1717, John Law, the French Comptroller General of Finances, decided to import African slaves into Louisiana. His objective was to develop the plantation economy of Lower Louisiana. The Royal Indies Company held a monopoly over the slave trade in the area. It imported approximately 6,000 slaves from Africa between 1719 and 1743. By 1730, 60% of the population of the colony were slaves (both Indigenous and African in origin). A small portion of these were sent to the Illinois Country to cultivate the fields or to work the lead mines. The economy of Lower Louisiana consequently became slave-dependent. As in other French colonies, the treatment of the slaves was regulated by the Code Noir. The slaves often had a degree of autonomy beyond that suggested by the code. Initially, during public holidays, slaves were permitted to sell a portion of the crops they had cultivated. Some would hunt, cut wood or keep livestock far from the plantation. Lastly, although interracial marriages and regroupings of slaves were prohibited, planters often kept slave mistresses. The life and work of the slaves was difficult, with the intense harvest season and processing of sugar undoubtedly the hardest. The maintenance of canals for rice irrigation and travel also involved much labor.

Slave residences and furnishings as supplied by planters were modest. The slaves were given simple straw pallets as beds. They typically had some trunks and kitchen utensils. The condition of the slaves depended on the treatment they received from their masters. When it was excessively cruel, the slaves often fled and hid in the marshes or in New Orleans. The Maroon societies that runaway slaves founded were often short-lived; Louisiana did not have the larger and semi-permanent Maroon villages that developed in the West Indies. Meanwhile, slave revolts were not as frequent in this area as they were in the Caribbean. The possibility of being set free was rather low; the slaves could not purchase their freedom. One of the first slaves to be freed was Louis Congo, who, in 1725, received freedom, land, and compensation in exchange for becoming the public executioner of New Orleans. Some freed slaves (notably women and former soldiers) formed small communities, which suffered from segregation; justice was more severe against them, and they did not have right to possess weapons. Slaves contributed to the creolization of Louisianan society. They brought okra from Africa, a plant common in the preparation of gumbo. While the Code Noir required that the slaves receive a Christian education, many secretly practiced animism and often combined elements of the two faiths.

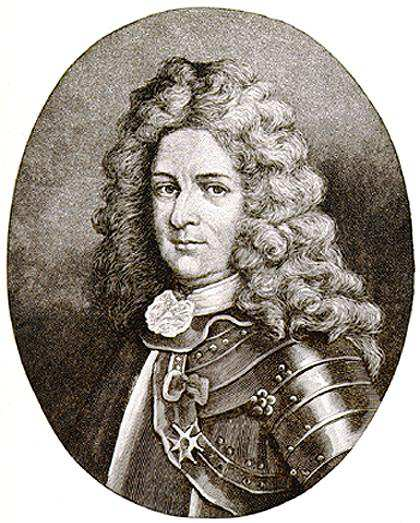
Pierre Le Moyne d'Iberville, governor of Louisiana in the early 17th century

=== Colonists ===
==== Creoles ====
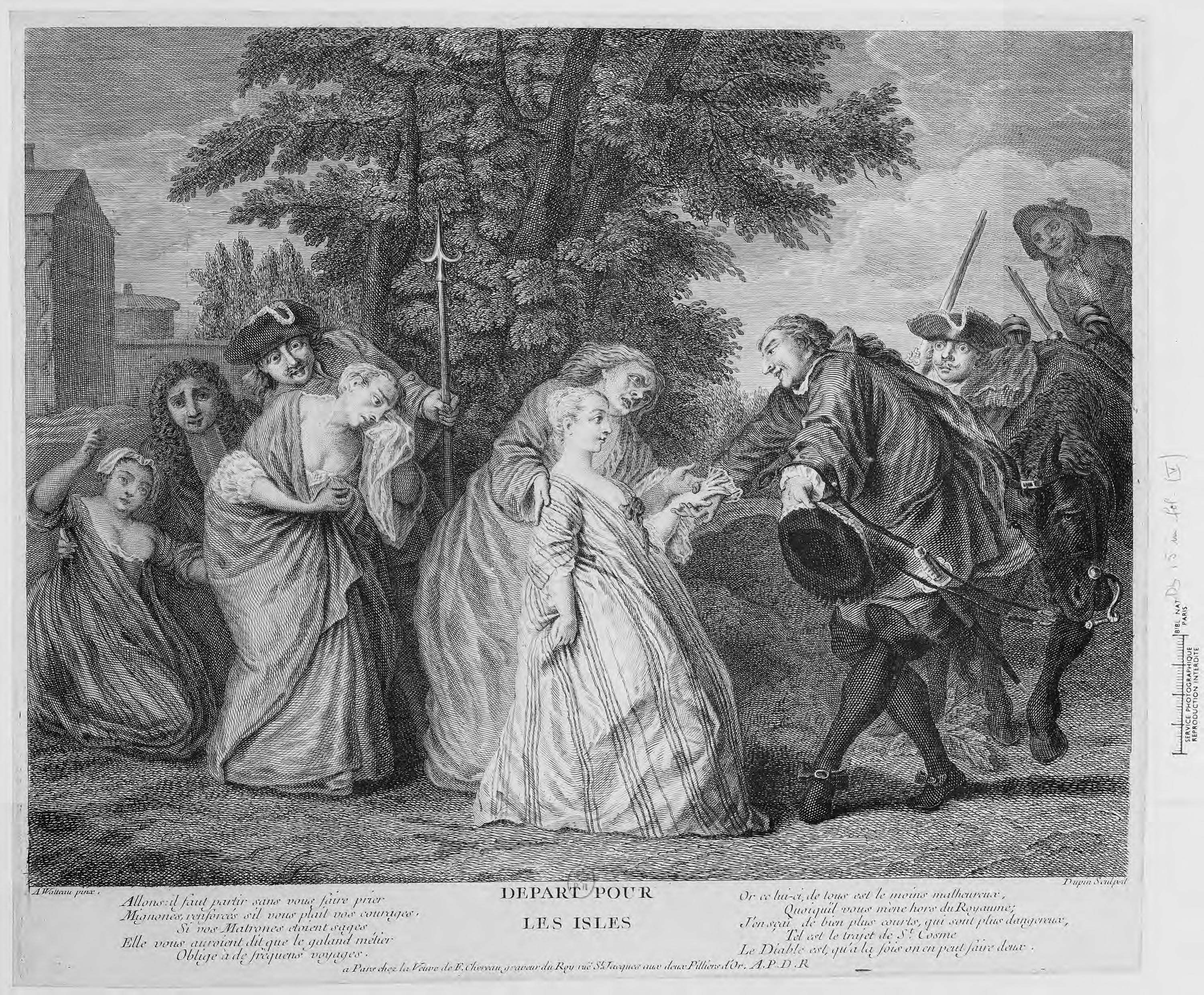
French unmarried women transported to Louisiana as brides for the colonists

The commonly accepted definition of Louisiana Creole today is the community whose members are a descendant of the "native-born" individuals of French Louisiana. Some individuals may have additional ethnic ancestries. It is estimated that 7,000 European immigrants settled in Louisiana during the 18th century, one-hundredth the number of inhabitants of the Thirteen Colonies on the Atlantic coast. Initially, creole was the term used for Europeans (and sometimes, separately for Africans) born in Louisiana, in contrast to those who immigrated there.

Louisiana attracted considerably fewer French colonists than did its West Indian colonies. After the crossing of the Atlantic Ocean, which lasted several months, the colonists had several challenges ahead of them. Their living conditions were difficult: uprooted, they had to face a new, often hostile, environment. Many of these immigrants died during the maritime crossing or soon after their arrival. Physical conditions were harsh, and the tropical climate was difficult for colonists. Hurricanes, unknown in France, periodically struck the coast, destroying whole villages. The Mississippi River Delta was plagued with periodic floods and yellow fever epidemics, to which malaria and cholera were added as part of the Eurasian diseases that arrived with the Europeans. These conditions slowed colonization.

Moreover, French villages and forts were not necessarily safe from enemy offensives. Attacks by Native Americans represented a real threat to the groups of isolated colonists; in 1729, their attacks killed 250 in Lower Louisiana. Forces of the Native American Natchez people took Fort Rosalie (now Natchez, Mississippi) by surprise, killing, among others, pregnant women. The French responded with warfare during the next two years: some Natchez were captured and deported as slaves to Saint Domingue; others left the area if they escaped.

Colonists were often young men, volunteers recruited in French ports or in Paris. Many served as indentured servants; they were required to remain in Louisiana for a length of time fixed by the contract of service to pay off their passage. During this time, they were "temporary semi-slaves". To increase the colonial population, the crown sent filles à la cassette ("casket girls," referring to the small trunks they arrived with), young Frenchwomen, to marry the soldiers. They were given a dowry financed by the King. This practice built upon the 17th-century precedent when Louis XIV paid for transport and dowries for about 800 filles du roi (King's Daughters) to emigrate to New France to encourage marriage and formation of families in the colony.

By contrast, other arrivals were described as women "of easy virtue", vagrants or outlaws, and those without family, who arrived in Louisiana with a lettre de cachet; they were sent by force to the colony, especially during the Régence period early in the reign of Louis XV. Their stories inspired the novel Story of the Knight of Grieux and Manon Lescaut, written by Abbé Prévost in 1731. In 1721, the ship La Baleine carried nearly 90 women of childbearing age to Louisiana; they were recruited from the Paris prison of La Salpetrière. Most quickly found husbands among the residents of the colony. These women, many of whom were most likely prostitutes or felons, were known as The Baleine Brides.

Communities of Swiss and German peoples also settled in French Louisiana, but royal authorities always referred to the population as "French". After the Seven Years' War, in which Britain defeated France, the settlement attracted a variety of groups: Spanish settlers, refugees from Saint Domingue (particularly after 1791 when the slave uprisings began), opponents of the French Revolution, and Acadians. In 1785, 1633 people of Acadian origin were brought from France to New Orleans, 30 years after having been expelled from Acadia by the British. Other Acadians were transported there by the British after they were expelled from Acadia. About 4,000 are thought to have settled in Louisiana, gradually forming the Cajun community.

==== Peasants, artisans, and merchants ====
Social mobility was easier in America than in France at the time. The seigneurial system was not imposed on the banks of the Mississippi, although the long lot land division scheme of the seigneurial system was adapted to some of the meandering rivers and bayous there. There were few corporations treated hierarchically and strictly regulated. Certain tradesmen managed to build fortunes rather quickly. The large planters of Louisiana were attached to the French way of life: they imported wigs and clothing fashionable in Paris. In the Country of Illinois, the wealthiest constructed stone-built houses and had several slaves. The largest traders mostly wound up settling in New Orleans.

==== French soldiers ====
The King sent the army in the event of conflict with the other colonial powers; in 1717, the colony of Mississippi counted 300 soldiers out of 550 people (Havard G, Vidal C, History of French America, p. 225.). However, the colonial army, like that of France, suffered from desertions. Certain soldiers fled to become coureurs de bois. There were few mutinies because repression was severe. The army held a fundamental place in the control of the territory. Soldiers built forts and frequently negotiated with the Native Americans.

==== Coureurs des bois ====
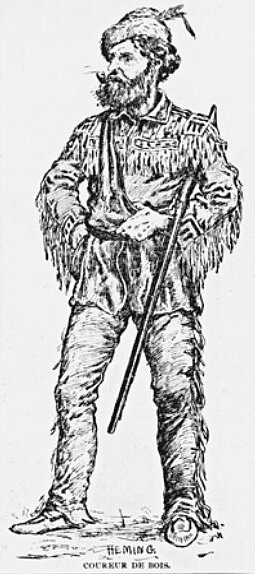
A coureur des bois

The coureurs des bois (literally "runners of the woods") played an important part, though not well documented, in the expansion of French influence in North America. By the end of the 17th century, these adventurers had journeyed the length of the Mississippi River. They were motivated by the hope of finding gold or of carrying out a profitable fur trade with the Indians. The fur trade, often practiced without authorization, was a difficult activity, carried on most of the time by young unmarried men. Many ultimately wished to go on to more sedentary agricultural activities. Meanwhile, a good number of them were integrated into native communities, learned the languages, and took native wives. A well-known example is the French Canadian Toussaint Charbonneau, husband to Sacagawea, who gave birth to Jean-Baptiste. They took part in the Lewis and Clark Expedition in 1804–1806.

== French and the Native Americans ==
Ancien Régime France wished to make Native Americans subjects of the king and good Christians, but the distance from Metropolitan France and the sparseness of French settlement prevented this. In official rhetoric, the Native Americans were regarded as subjects of the king of France, but in reality, they were largely autonomous due to their numerical superiority. The local authorities (governors, officers) did not have the means of imposing their decisions, and often compromised. The tribes offered essential support for the French in Louisiana: they ensured the survival of the colonists, participated with them in the fur trade, and were used as guides in expeditions. Their alliance was also essential in wars against other tribes and European colonies.

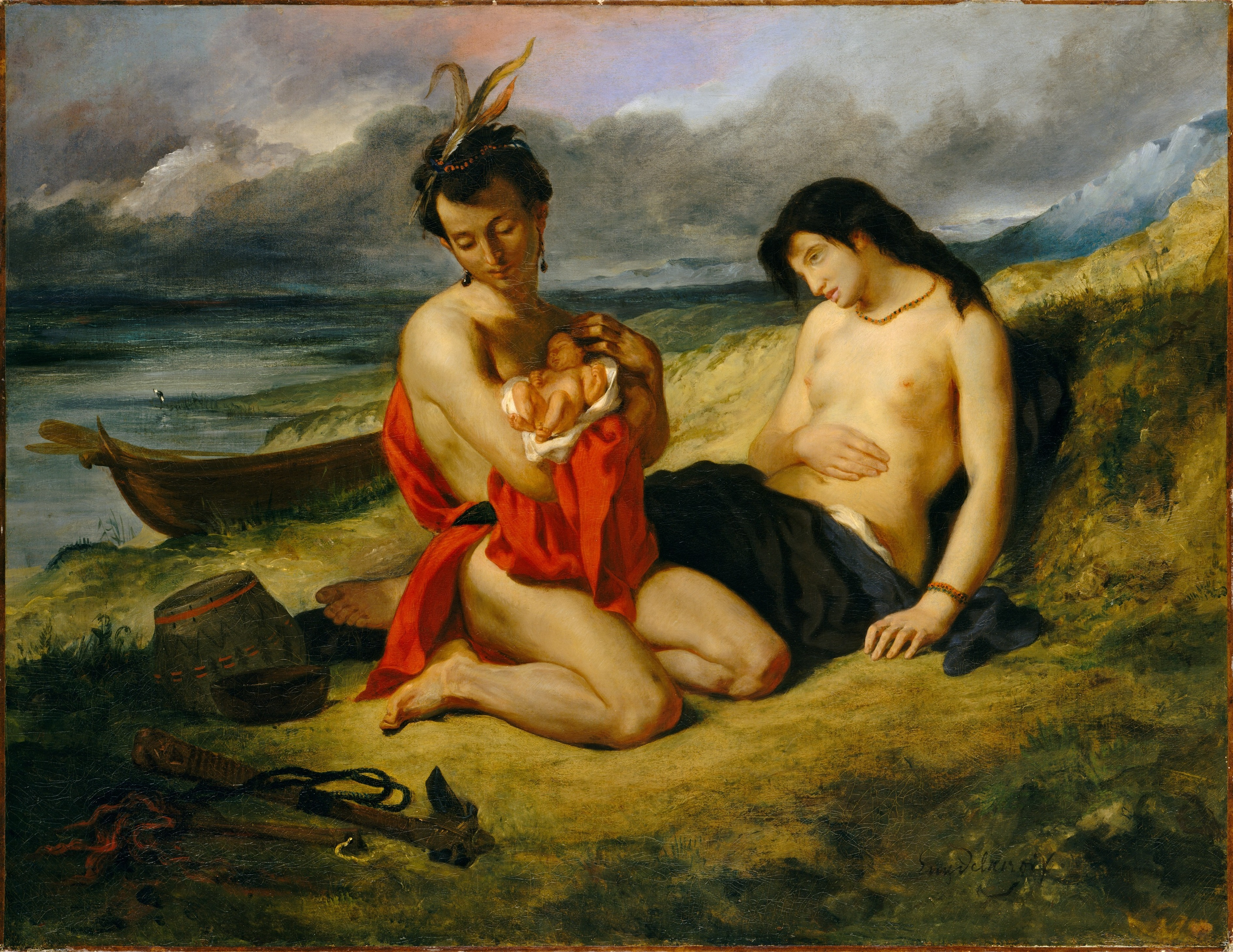
Eugène Delacroix, Les Natchez, Metropolitan Museum of Art, 1832–1835. The Natchez tribe were the fiercest opponents of the French in Louisiana.

The two peoples influenced each other in many fields: the French learned the languages of the natives, who bought European goods (fabric, alcohol, firearms, etc.), and sometimes adopted their religion. The coureurs des bois and the soldiers borrowed canoes and moccasins. Many of them ate native food such as wild rice and various meats, like bear and dog. The colonists were often dependent on the Native Americans for food. Creole cuisine is the heir of these mutual influences: thus, sagamité, for example, is a mix of corn pulp, bear fat and bacon. Today jambalaya, a word of Seminole origin, refers to a multitude of recipes calling for meat and rice, all very spicy. Sometimes shamans succeeded in curing the colonists thanks to traditional remedies, such as the application of fir tree gum on wounds and Royal Fern on rattlesnake bites.

Many colonists both admired and feared the military power of the Native Americans, but others scorned their culture and regarded them as racially less pure than the Whites. In 1735, interracial marriages without the approval of the authorities were prohibited in Louisiana. The Jesuit priests were often scandalized by the supposedly libertine ways of the Native Americans. In spite of some disagreements (the Indians killed pigs, which devastated corn fields), and sometimes violent confrontations (Fox Wars, Natchez uprisings, and expeditions against the Chicachas), the relationship with the Native Americans was relatively good in Louisiana. French imperialism was expressed through some wars and the slavery of some Native Americans. But most of the time, the relationship was based on dialogue and negotiation.

== Economy of French Louisiana ==
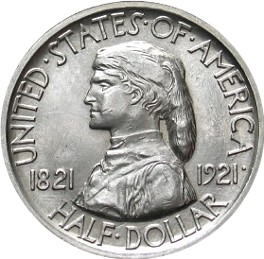
Profile of an American trapper (Missouri)

=== Illinois Country ===
This comparatively sparsely-settled northern area of French Louisiana was formerly the southern part of French Canada, and was transferred in 1717 by order of the King. It lies along the Mississippi and its tributaries, and was primarily devoted to grain and cereals agriculture. The French farmers lived in villages (such as near Fort de Chartres (the colonial administrative center), Kaskaskia, Prairie du Rocher, and Sainte-Geneviève). They cultivated the land with paid and slave laborers, producing mostly corn and wheat. The fields were cleared with ploughs. They raised horses, cows and pigs, and also grew a little tobacco, hemp, flax and grapes (though most wine was still imported from France). Agriculture was seasonal and periodic flooding of the Mississippi took its toll on these communities.

The trading posts in the Illinois Country concentrated mostly on the fur trade. Placed at strategic points, they were modestly fortified. Only a few were made out of stone (e.g., Fort de Chartres). Like their American "mountain man" counterparts, the coureurs des bois exchanged beaverskin or deer pelts for weapons, cloth or shoddy goods, because the local economy was based on barter. The skins and fur are later sold in the forts and cities of New France. The Illinois Country also produced salt and lead, and provided New Orleans with game.

=== Lower Louisiana ===
Lower Louisiana's plantation economy was based on slave labor. The owners generally had their main residence in New Orleans and entrusted the supervision of the fields to a treasurer.

Crops were varied and adapted to the climate and terrain. Part of the production was intended for use by Louisianans (corn, vegetables, rice, livestock), the rest being exported to France (especially tobacco and indigo).

==== Economic role of New Orleans ====
New Orleans was the economic capital of Louisiana, though it remained a village for several decades. The colonists built infrastructure to encourage trade; a canal was dug in 1723. The shops on the banks of the Mississippi also served as warehouses. The city exported pelts from the interior as well as agricultural products from the plantations. It was also, of course, a local hub of commerce.

The rare shipments from France brought food (lard, wheat...), alcohol, and various indispensable finished products (weapons, tools, cloth, and clothing). Exports remained relatively weak on the whole. New Orleans continued to sell wood, rice, and corn to the French West Indies.

== End of French Louisiana ==
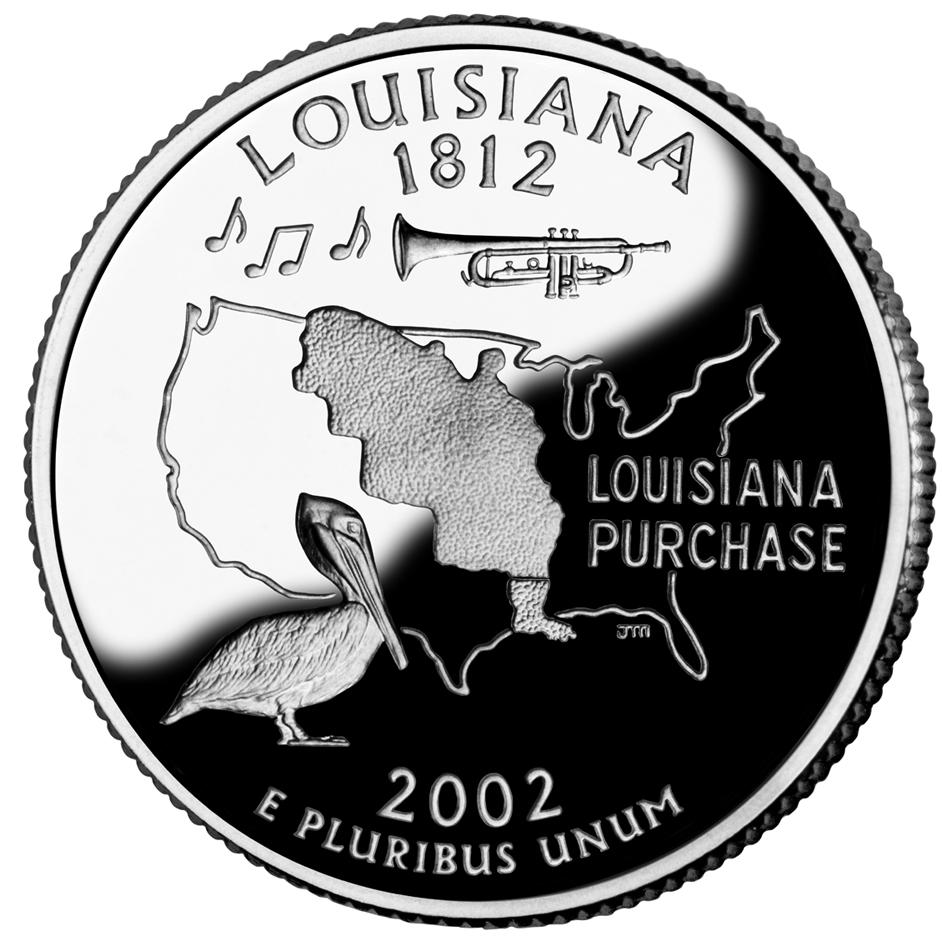

=== Seven Years' War and its consequences ===
The hostility between the French and British flared up again two years before the beginning of the Seven Years' War in Europe. In North America, the war became known as the French and Indian War. After some early victories from 1754 to 1757, thanks to help from their Native American allies, the French suffered several disastrous defeats in Canada from 1758 to 1760, culminating in the surrender of the capital city Quebec. With the loss of Canada, defense of Louisiana became impossible.

The Treaty of Paris, signed on 10 February 1763, formalized the eviction of the French from North America. Canada and the east bank of the Mississippi were handed over to Great Britain (Province of Quebec (1763–1791)). New Orleans and the west bank of the river had been secretly given to Spain the previous year. This decision provoked the departure of a small number of settlers; however, the Spaniards effectively took control of their new territories, which they named Luisiana, rather late (in 1769), and there was not much Spanish immigration. To the East, the United States foresaw the conquest of the West; commercial navigation on the Mississippi was opened to Americans in 1795.

=== Ephemeral renewal of French Louisiana ===
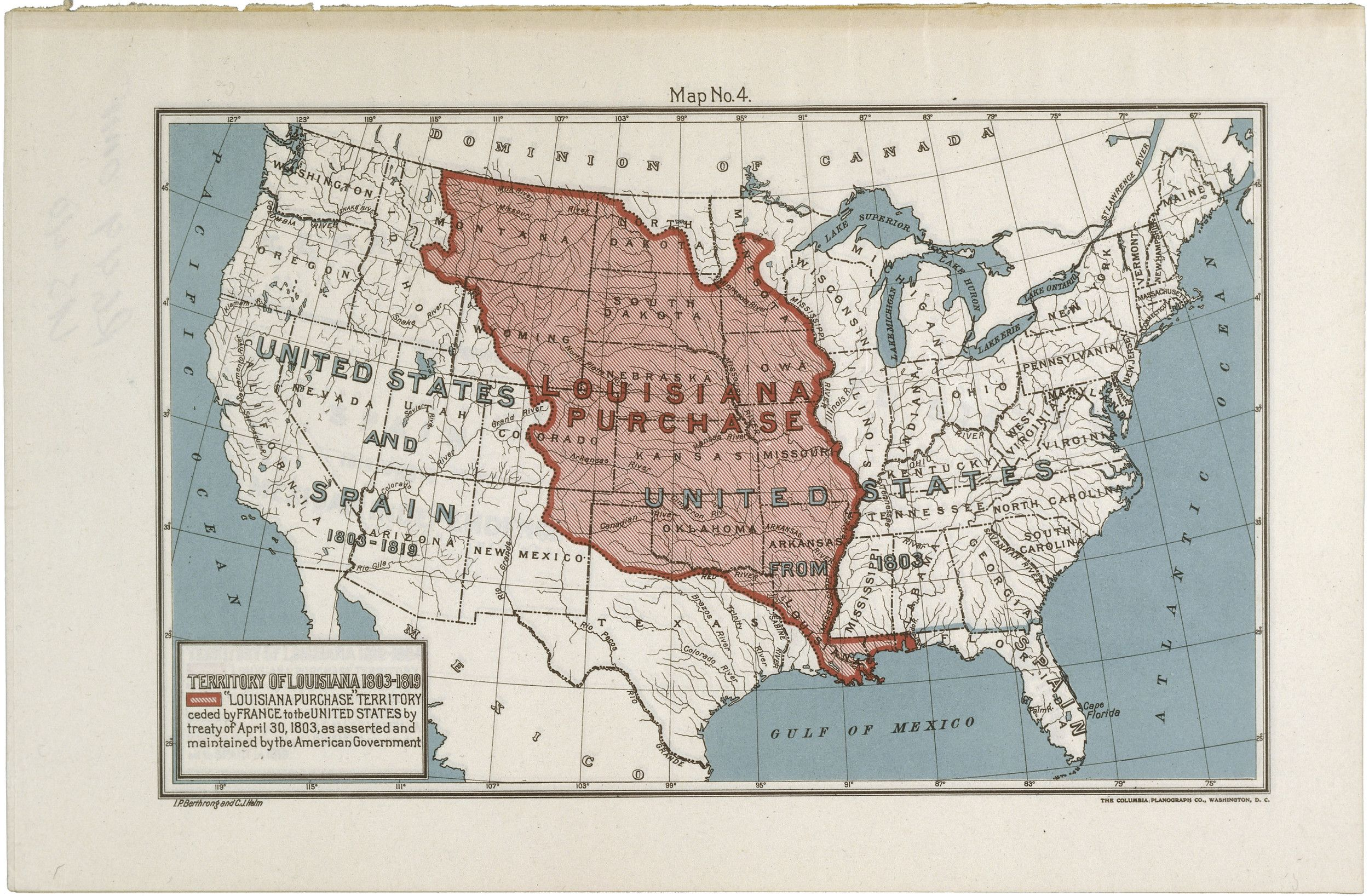
The Louisiana Purchase territory depicted without the included territory north of the 49th parallel, but with West Florida, which, as a Spanish colony, was not part of the purchase

During the French Revolution, Louisiana was agitated under Spanish control: certain French-speaking colonists sent petitions to the metropolis and the slaves attempted revolts in 1791 and 1795.

The Third Treaty of San Ildefonso, signed in secrecy on October 1, 1800, envisaged the transfer of Western Louisiana as well as New Orleans to France in exchange for the Duchy of Parma. The transfer was confirmed by the Treaty of Aranjuez signed on March 21, 1801. However, Napoleon Bonaparte soon decided not to keep the immense territory. The forces he sent to take possession of Louisiana were first ordered to restore French control over the colony of Saint-Domingue; their failure to do so, and deteriorating Anglo-French relations, prompted him to decide to sell Louisiana to the United States. This was done on April 30, 1803, for the sum of 80 million francs (15 million dollars). American sovereignty was established on December 20, 1803.

== French heritage today ==
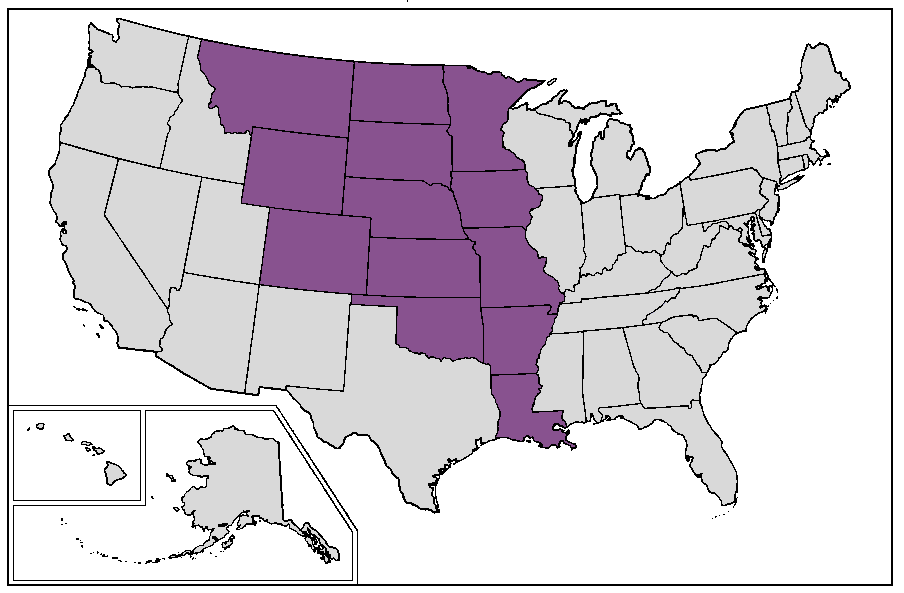
Map of current U.S. states that were completely or mostly inside the borders of post-1764 colonial Louisiana at the time of the Louisiana Purchase

French colonization in Louisiana left a cultural inheritance that has been celebrated significantly in recent decades. The heritage of the French language, Louisiana Creole French, and Cajun French has been most threatened; for this reason, the CODOFIL (Council for the Development of French in Louisiana) was created in 1968. A subject of debate is the variety of French that should be taught: that of France, Canadian French, standard Louisiana French, or Cajun French. Today, many Cajun-dominated areas of Louisiana have formed associations with Acadian communities in Canada, which send French professors to re-teach the language in the schools. In 2003, 7% of Louisianans were French-speaking, though most also spoke English. An estimated 25% of the state's population has some French ancestry, carrying a number of last names of French origin (e.g., LeBlanc, Cordier, Dauthier, Dion, Menard, Pineaux, Hébert, Ardoin, Roubideaux).

Many cities and villages have names of French origin. They include St. Louis, Detroit, Baton Rouge, New Orleans, Lafayette, Mobile, Des Moines, St. Cloud, and Duluth. (However, present day Duluth is located in what used to be the old Northwest Territory, not the former Louisiana Territory). The official motto of the state of Minnesota ("L'etoile du Nord", The Star of the North) is the only state motto in French, derived from the state’s French colonial history. The Iowa state flag uses a variation of the French national flag as its base. The Missouri state flag and flag of New Orleans colors are based on the French flag. The flag of St. Louis has a fleur-de-lis prominently displayed. Historical festivals and commemorations point out the French presence: in 1999, Louisiana celebrated the 300th anniversary of its foundation; in 2001, Detroit did the same. In 2003, the 200th anniversary of the Louisiana Purchase was commemorated on numerous occasions as well as by a formal conference to recall its history. Certain places testify to a cultural inheritance left by the French; a prime example is the French Quarter of New Orleans. In 2015, St. Louis celebrated the 250th anniversary of its founding by the French in 1764. Many French forts have been rebuilt and opened to visitors.

A key part of Louisianan culture finds its roots in the French period: Creole songs influenced the blues and jazz. Cajun music, often sung in French, remains very much alive today. New Orleans' Carnival season, with its height on Mardi Gras Day, testifies to a long-lived Roman Catholic heritage.

== See also ==
- List of colonial governors of Louisiana
- List of French possessions and colonies
