= Japanese ship Kongō =

Kongō is the name of three naval vessels of Japan:

- Japanese ironclad Kongō (1877–1909), a Kongō-class ironclad of the Imperial Japanese Navy.
- Japanese battleship Kongō (1912–1945), the nameship of her class of battlecruisers, which were later modified into battleships.
- JS Kongō (DDG-173), launched in 1991, also the nameship of her class of destroyers.

Kongō Maru is the name of two Japanese ships:

- Kongō Maru (1934), passenger-cargo ship launched in 1934, converted to a Kongō Maru-class armed merchantman in 1941, sunk in 1942
- Kongō Maru (1936), passenger-cargo ship launched in 1936, wrecked in 1951
