= Congo River (disambiguation) =

The Congo River is a river in Africa.

Congo River or Río Congo may also refer to:

- Congo River (Panama), a river in Panama
- Congo River (Ecuador), a river in Ecuador
- Congo River, Beyond Darkness, a 2005 Belgian documentary by Thierry Michel
- Congo Run, a stream in Hancock County, West Virginia, U.S.
- Río Congo, Darién, a corregimiento (subdivision of a district) in Panama
- Congo River Rapids (Alton Towers), a water rapids ride at Alton Towers

== See also ==
- Congo (disambiguation)
