= Conga (disambiguation) =

The conga is a Cuban drum.

Conga may also refer to:

== Places ==
- Co’nga, a village in Tibet

== Arts and entertainment ==
- Conga (music), a Cuban music genre and ensemble
  - Conga line, a novelty dance derived from the music genre
- "Conga" (song), a 1985 single by Miami Sound Machine sung by Gloria Estefan
- Chinchón (card game), called "La Conga" or "Conga" in Uruguay

== Other uses ==
- Conga (skipper), a genus of butterfly
- Conga Corporation, a business-to-business software provider

== See also ==
- Conger (disambiguation)
- Congo (disambiguation)
