= King Kong (disambiguation) =

King Kong is a fictional giant ape-like monster that has appeared in numerous works since 1933.

King Kong may also refer to:

== Film and television ==
- King Kong (franchise), a franchise centered on King Kong
- King Kong (1933 film), starring Fay Wray, Robert Armstrong and Bruce Cabot
- King Kong (1976 film), a remake of the 1933 film
- The Mighty Kong, a 1998 animated film
- King Kong (2005 film), another remake of the 1933 film
- Kong: Skull Island, the 2017 reboot set in the Godzilla-Kong cinematic universe known as MonsterVerse
- Major T.J. "King" Kong, a character in the film Dr. Strangelove played by Slim Pickens

== Music ==
- King Kong (band), a rock band from Louisville, Kentucky
- King Kong: Jean-Luc Ponty Plays the Music of Frank Zappa, a 1970 album
- King Kong (Gorilla Zoe album), released in 2011
- King Kong (1959 musical), a South African jazz-influenced musical
- King Kong (2013 musical), a musical that premiered in Australia, sometimes titled King Kong: The Eighth Wonder of the World
- King Kong (2005 soundtrack), the soundtrack to the 2005 film

=== Songs ===
- "King Kong" (E-Rotic song), 2001
- "King Kong" (Jibbs song)
- "King Kong Song", by Abba
- "King Kong", by Anson Lo, 2022
- "King Kong", by Bow Wow Wow from the album See Jungle! See Jungle! Go Join Your Gang Yeah, City All Over! Go Ape Crazy!
- "King Kong", by Daniel Johnston from the album Yip/Jump Music
- "King Kong", a composition by Frank Zappa on the 1969 Mothers of Invention album Uncle Meat
- "King Kong", by Psapp from the album Psapp
- "King Kong", by The Kinks from the album "Arthur (Or the Decline and Fall of the British Empire)"
- "King Kong – Part 1", by Jimmy Castor
- "King Kong (Your Song)", by Bobby Pickett and Peter Ferrara

== Sports ==
- Nickname of Joseph Agbeko, a Ghanaian boxer
- Nickname of Alexander Romanov, a Moldovan mixed martial artist and freestyle wrestler
- Nickname of Dave Kingman, a professional baseball player
- King Kong Bundy (1955-2019), ring name of Chris Pallies, professional wrestler
- King Kong Brody, ring name of Frank Goodish (1946–1988), professional wrestler, also known as Bruiser Brody
- King Kong (Emile Czaja), ring name of Emile Czaja (1909-1970), Australian-Indian professional wrestler
- King Kong Mosca, ring name of Angelo Mosca, professional wrestler and former CFL football player
- King Kong, ring name of Scott Thompson, professional wrestler
- King Kong Kirk, Malcolm Kirk (1935-1987), English former professional wrestler

== People ==
- King Kong (musician), Jamaican reggae singer
- Shankar Ezhumalai or King Kong (actor) (born 1971), Indian film actor
- King Kong Lee (born 1981), Taiwanese host and actor
- King Kong Lam (born 1969), Hong Kong actor

== Other uses ==
- Kenny McFarlane, a character nicknamed "King Kong" from the Ultimate Spider-Man series
- King Kong, a nickname of Second World War double agent Christiaan Lindemans
- King Kong (comics), several comic books based on the famous movie monster
- King Kong (Universal Studios Dubailand), a roller coaster at Universal Studios Dubailand, Dubai, United Arab Emirates
- King Kong (dessert), a Peruvian candy
- King Kong statue, a 1972 pop art statue by Nicholas Monro
- King Kong (1982 video game), a video game for the Atari 2600
- King Kong by Starship, a South Korean entertainment company (formerly known as King Kong Entertainment)
- King Kong (2005 video game), based on the 2005 film

== See also ==
- King Kong & D. Jungle Girls, an Italian Europop singing group
- "King Kong Song", by ABBA
- Kong (disambiguation)
- Kongō (disambiguation)
- Congo (disambiguation)
- 金剛山 (disambiguation)
