= Congo, Paraíba =

Coordinates: 7°47′49″S 36°39′36″W

- Municipality
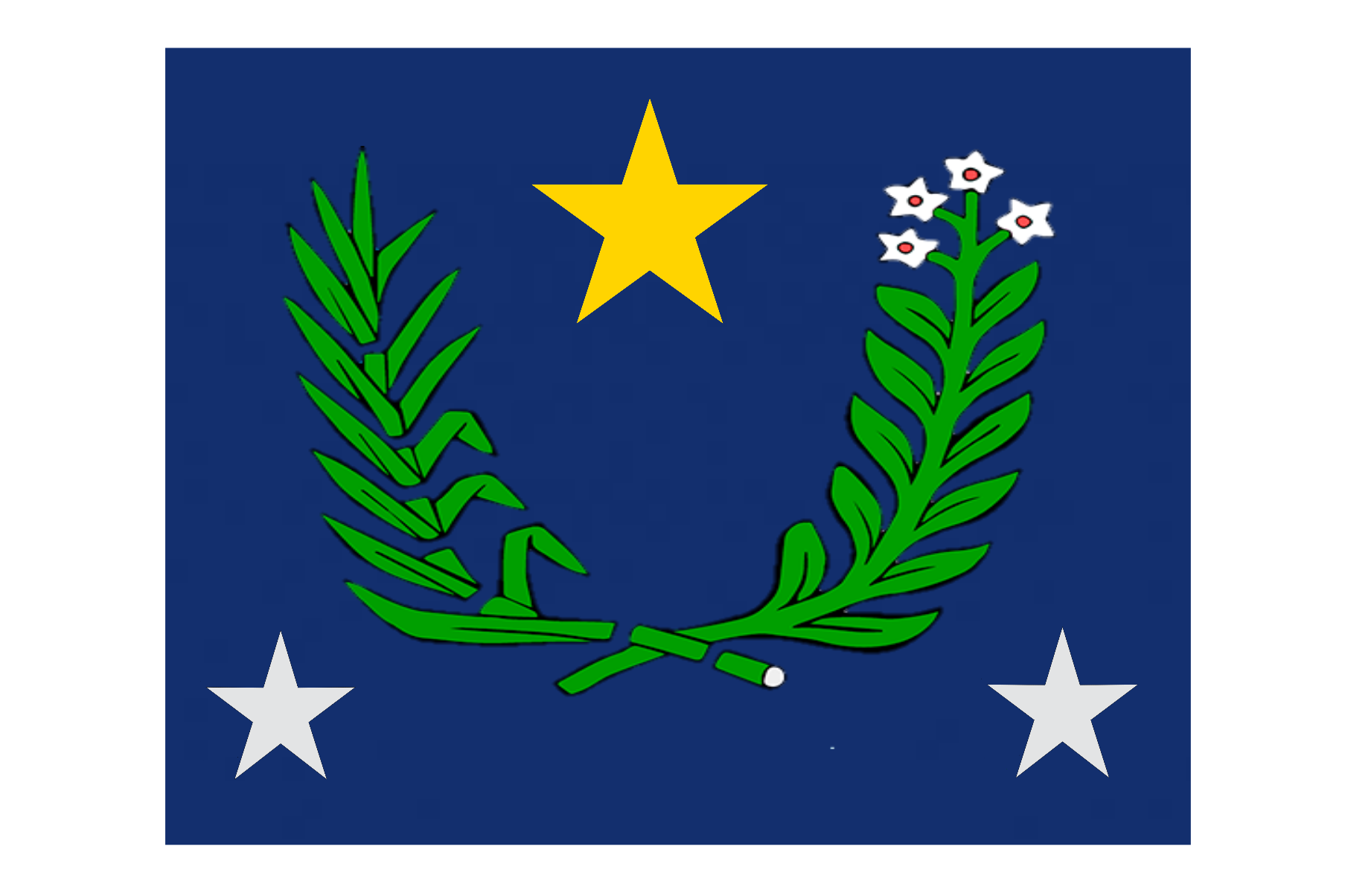
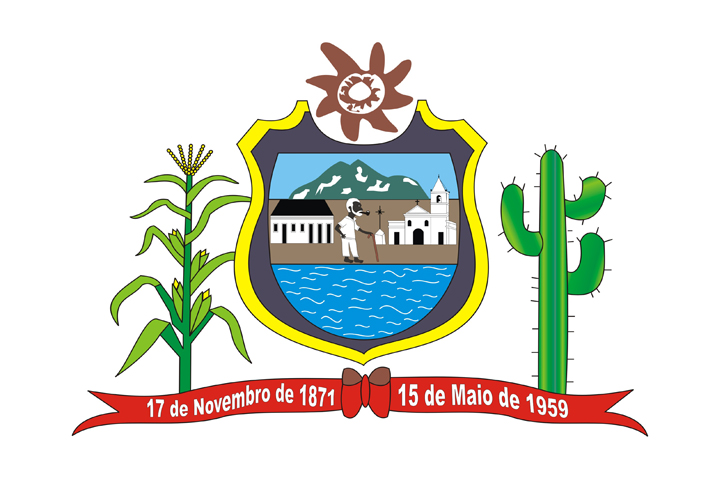
- Flag Coat of arms
- Interactive map of Congo, Paraíba
- Country: Brazil
- Region: South
- State: Paraíba
- Mesoregion: Borborema

Population (2020)
  - Total: 4,787
- Time zone: UTC−3 (BRT)

Congo (Central northeastern portuguese pronunciation: [ˈkõɡu]) is a municipality in the state of Paraíba in the Northeast Region of Brazil.

== See also ==
- List of municipalities in Paraíba
