= J. Newton Conger House =

Historic house in Illinois, United States

- U.S. National Register of Historic Places
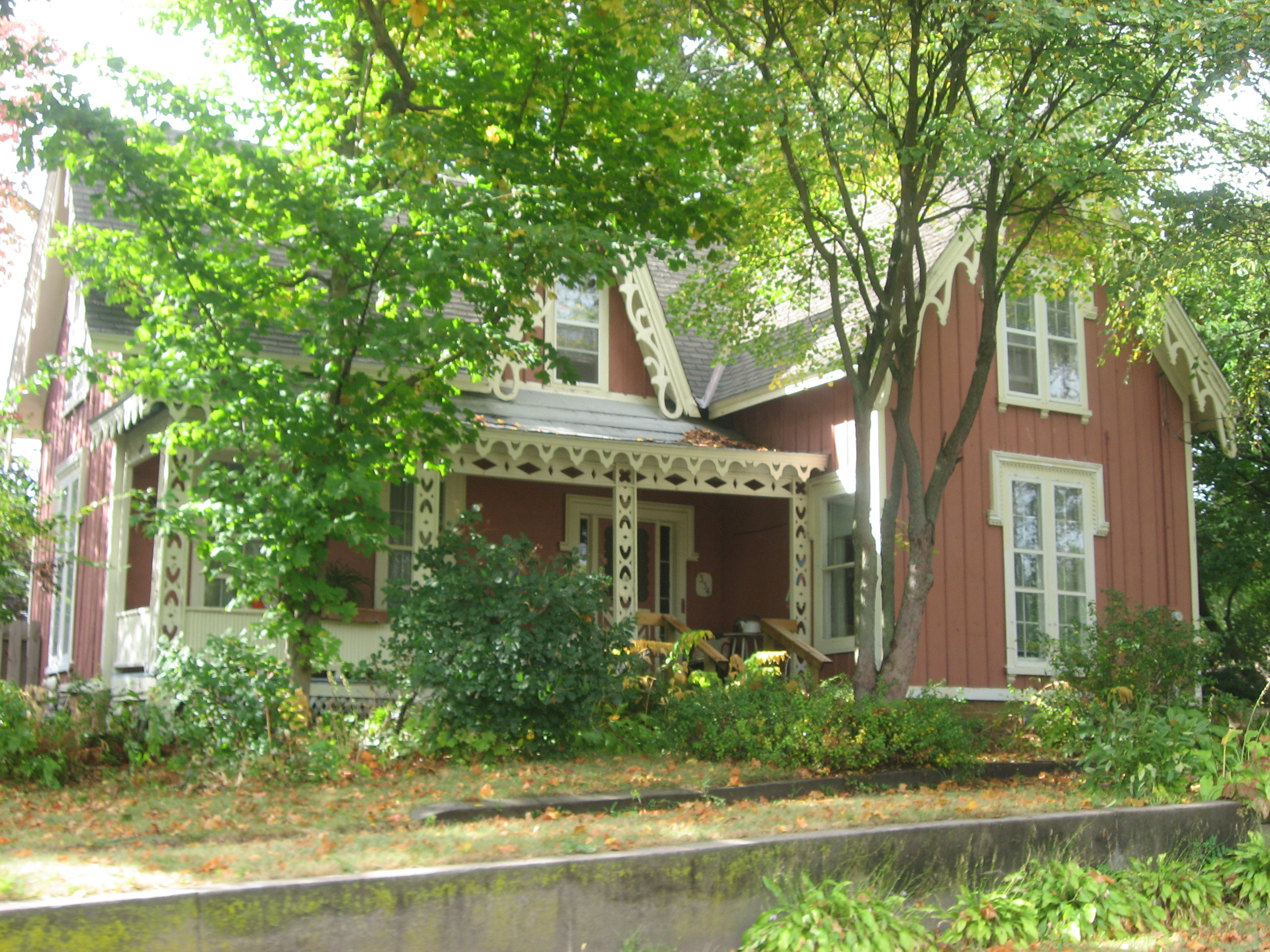

- Location within Illinois Location within the United States
- Location: 334 N. Knox St., Oneida, Illinois
- Coordinates: 41°5′3″N 90°13′39″W
- Area: 1 acre (0.40 ha)
- Built: 1860
- Architectural style: Gothic
- NRHP reference No.: 79003111
- Added to NRHP: April 20, 1979

The J. Newton Conger House is a historic house located at 334 North Knox Street in Oneida, Illinois. P. G. Hubbard had the house built in 1860; four years later, it was sold to J. Newton Conger, a livestock shipper and prominent local citizen. The house has a Carpenter Gothic design described as the best example of the style in Knox County. The front porch and the roof's steep gables feature gingerbread trim along the edges, a characteristic feature of the style. The house's tall and narrow windows have decorative hat-like surrounds along the top and upper sides.
