= Kongo class =

Kongo class may refer to either:

- Kongō-class ironclad, a class of ironclad corvettes in service with the Imperial Japanese Navy during the late nineteenth century
- Kongō-class battlecruiser, a class of battlecruisers in service with the Imperial Japanese Navy during World War I and II
- Kongō-class destroyer, a class of destroyer currently in service with the Japan Maritime Self-Defense Force
