= Congo – A Political Tragedy =

Congo - A Political Tragedy
- Directed by: Patrick Kabeya
- Written by: Patrick Kabeya; Mina Malu
- Produced by: KM Media Production; UPAF
- Narrated by: Mina Malu
- Edited by: Patrick Kabeya
- Music by: Richard Hall
- Release date: 21 April 2018 (Festival International du film Panafricain)
- Running time: 87 minutes
- Countries: Canada; Democratic Republic of Congo; Switzerland
- Language: French

Congo – A Political Tragedy is a 2018 independent documentary story of the Democratic Republic of Congo's political history, written by Patrick Kabeya and Mina Malu. It chronicles the Congo Free State, The Belgian Congo as well as the key figures that played a role in its history such as Belgian King Leopold II, Patrice Lumumba, Joseph Kasa-Vubu, Joseph Mobutu, Moise Tshombe and Laurent Desire Kabila.

== Reception ==
The film was first screened at the 2018 Festival international du film panafricain de Cannes.

== Awards ==
- Audiences Choice Awards - Trinidad, Caribbean 2019
