= Congo, Missouri =

Extinct town in Missouri, United States

Coordinates: 36°56′21″N 91°36′08″W

Congo is an extinct town in southwestern Shannon County, in the U.S. state of Missouri. Congo and the Congo School were located approximately three miles southwest of Montier and US Route 60. Spring Creek flows past the location to the southwest.

A post office called Congo was established in 1895, and remained in operation until 1931. The community was named after the Congo River, in Africa.
