= Jonathan Clark Conger House =

Historic house in Iowa, United States

- U.S. National Register of Historic Places
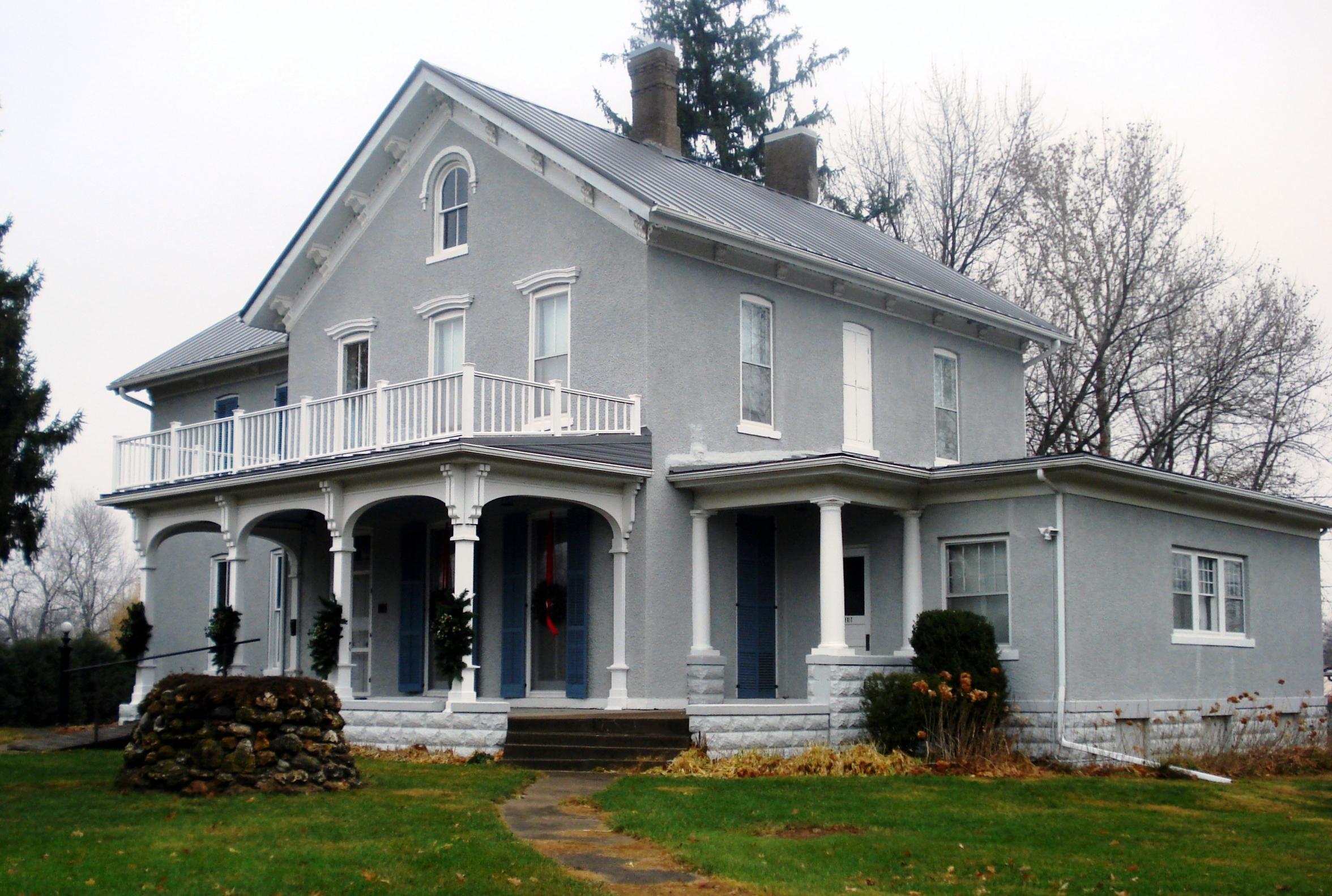

- Location within Iowa Location within the United States
- Location: 903 E. Washington St., Washington, Iowa
- Coordinates: 41°17′53″N 91°40′54″W
- Area: 2.9 acres (1.2 ha)
- Built: 1848, 1867
- Built by: John Patterson Huskins
- NRHP reference No.: 74000815
- Added to NRHP: June 28, 1974

The Jonathan Clark Conger House (now the Conger House Museum) is a historic house museum located at 903 East Washington Street in Washington, Iowa.

== Description and history ==
The original section of the house was built by teacher and author of the first Washington County history Nathan Littler. Businessman Jonathan Clark Conger bought the house and added major additions in 1867 that were built by John Patterson Huskins. Conger was also responsible for adding a small den in 1906. The two-story brick house was covered with concrete sometime in the early 20th century. The cement and concrete block porch replaced the 1870s era wooden porch. The house has subsequently been converted into a house museum operated by the Washington County Historical Society.

It was listed on the National Register of Historic Places in 1974.
