= Kongolo =

Kongolo may refer to:

- Kongolo Mwamba, the first king of the Luba Empire
- Kongolo, Tanganyika District, a town on the Lualaba River in the Democratic Republic of the Congo
- Kongolo, a ward of Mbarali District, Mbeya Region, Tanzania
- Roman Catholic Diocese of Kongolo, a diocese based on the town of Kongolo
- Rodney Kongolo (born 1998), Dutch professional footballer
