= Louis Congo =

Worldwide

Louis Congo was an enslaved African man who was freed in 1725 from the Company of the Indies by Louisiana officials and who was appointed public executioner. He served in this office for at least twelve years and was granted the authority to execute punishments to not only fellow Africans but also white settlers. During this time, he was given charge of performing whippings, brandings, amputations, torture, and hangings.

Court records indicate that, on multiple occasions, Congo's position made him the target of vicious attacks, as he was brutally beaten at least twice. He and the attorney general sought thorough investigation and punishment in these cases, with it being stated that "the life of said Congo would not be secure if such murderous thugs ... were tolerated."

In addition to his freedom, in exchange for his service, Congo received 2 arpents (0.68 ha; 1.7 acres) of land located on the outskirts of New Orleans and received a regular ration of wine. Also, although his wife was not formally freed, she was permitted to live with him and was relieved of labor. Congo also received monetary compensation for each punishment inflicted: flogging earned him 10 pounds, while hanging was worth 30 pounds, and he was compensated 40 pounds for breaking someone on the wheel or for burning someone alive.

It is noted that, unusual for a black man in his time and place, Congo could sign his name. It is suspected that said name was created in reference to the places he lived: Louis for Louisiana, Congo for the region of his birth. If, as his name indicates, he did come from the region of the Congo Basin, records suggest that he was brought to the Americas in 1721 aboard la Neréide, which was the only ship known to have traveled from Cabinda, Angola, to Biloxi in the French colony.
