= 金剛山 =

金剛山 may refer to:

- Mount Kongō, a mountain in Osaka Prefecture, Japan
- Mount Kongō (Higashihiroshima), a mountain in Higashihiroshima, Japan
- Mount Kongō (Kitakyushu), a mountain in Yahatanishi-ku, Kitakyūshū, Japan
- Mount Kongō (Sado), a mountain in Sado, Niigata, Japan
- Mount Kumgang, a mountain in Kangwon-do, North Korea

== See also ==
These Buddhist temples have 金剛山 as part of their formal names:

- Fujii-dera (藤井寺 or 金剛山藤井寺), located in Yoshinogawa, Tokushima, Japan
- Heiken-ji (平間寺 or 金剛山平間寺), or Kawasaki Daishi (川崎大師), located in Kawasaki, Kanagawa, Japan
