= Kongo, Liberia =

Town in Grand Cape Mount County, Liberia

Coordinates: 07°19′41″N 11°08′20″W

Kongo is a small town in Grand Cape Mount County, Liberia, on the border with Sierra Leone. It served an iron ore mine (the former National Iron Ore Company, Ltd. (NIOC)), with a narrow gauge railway, which are both currently out of use. There are similar iron ore deposits across the Mano River which forms the border between the two countries.

== See also ==
- Railway stations in Liberia
