= Paul S. Conger =

American botanist (1897-1979)

- Born: 1897
- Died: 1979
- Scientific career
- Fields: Botany
- Institutions: Carnegie Institution for Science

Paul Sydney Conger (1897–1979) was an American botanist.

== Biography ==
Conger was born in 1897. His specialty was the study of diatoms, which are common components of phytoplankton. He worked with Albert Mann (1853–1935), who was also a diatomist, at Carnegie Institution for Science in Washington, D.C. He became a member of the Carnegie Institution and worked as Mann's assistant in the lab in 1922. After Mann died, Conger served as research associate at the CIS from 1935 to 1943. During the same years, he was named Honorary Custodian of Diatoms at the United States National Museum. From 1944 to 1966 he became an associate curator, and was Botanist Emeritus of Cryptogams from 1967 until his death in 1979.
