= Kongo, Ghana =

Kongo
- Country: Ghana
- Region: Upper East Region

Kongo is a town in the Upper East Region of Ghana. The town is known for the Kongo Secondary School. The school is a second cycle institution.
