= Mount Kongō (Sado) =

Mountain in Sado, Niigata, Japan

- 金剛山; Kongō-san
- Location within Japan

Highest point
- Elevation: 962.2 m (3,157 ft)
- Coordinates: 38°10′20″N 138°25′09″E

Naming
- English translation: Golden Strength Mountain
- Language of name: Japanese

Geography
- Location: Mount Kongō is located in Sado, Niigata, Japan
- Parent range: Ōsado Range

Mount Kongō (金剛山, Kongō-san) is a 962.2-metre-high (3,157 ft) mountain in the city of Sado, located on Sado Island in Niigata, Japan. The Sado mine and Mount Kinpoku are nearby.
