= Kongo University =

University in the DRC

- Université Kongo
- Motto: Excellence, Solidarité, Développement
- Motto in English: Excellence, Solidarity, Development
- Established: 1990; 36 years ago
- Language: French language
- Website: https://universitekongo.cd/

Kongo University (French: l’Université Kongo) is a university in the Democratic Republic of the Congo. Its name is abbreviated to UK, after its French name. The main offices of the university are located in Mbanza-Ngungu. UK currently operates two linked campuses, at Mbanza-Ngungu and at Kisantu. A permanent third campus at Mbanza-Luvaka has been under construction since 1992.

== Faculties and programs ==
=== Mbanza-Ngungu Campus ===
- Faculty of Business and Economics
- Faculty of Engineering
- Faculty of Law

=== Kisantu Campus ===
- Faculty of Agriculture
- Faculty of Medicine
- Faculty of Literature and Mass Communication

== See also ==
- List of universities in the Democratic Republic of the Congo
- Education in the Democratic Republic of the Congo
