= Rand Conger =

American developmental psychologist

- Born: August 29, 1941 (age 85); Tacoma, Washington
- Education: University of Washington
- Awards: (with Glen Elder) Rural Sociological Society's Award for Distinguished Service to Rural Life (2003)
- Scientific career
- Fields: Developmental psychology Social psychology
- Workplaces: University of California, Davis
- Thesis: A comparative study of interaction patterns between deviant and non-deviant families (1976)

Rand Donald Conger (born August 29, 1941) is Distinguished Professor Emeritus of Human Development & Family Studies at the University of California, Davis. He previously taught at Iowa State University, where he was the founding director of the Institute for Social and Behavioral Research. He is known for his research on risk factors for, and protective factors against, substance use and mental disorders. He has also researched the effects of stress on child development and academic achievement.
