= Kongō Maru (1934) =

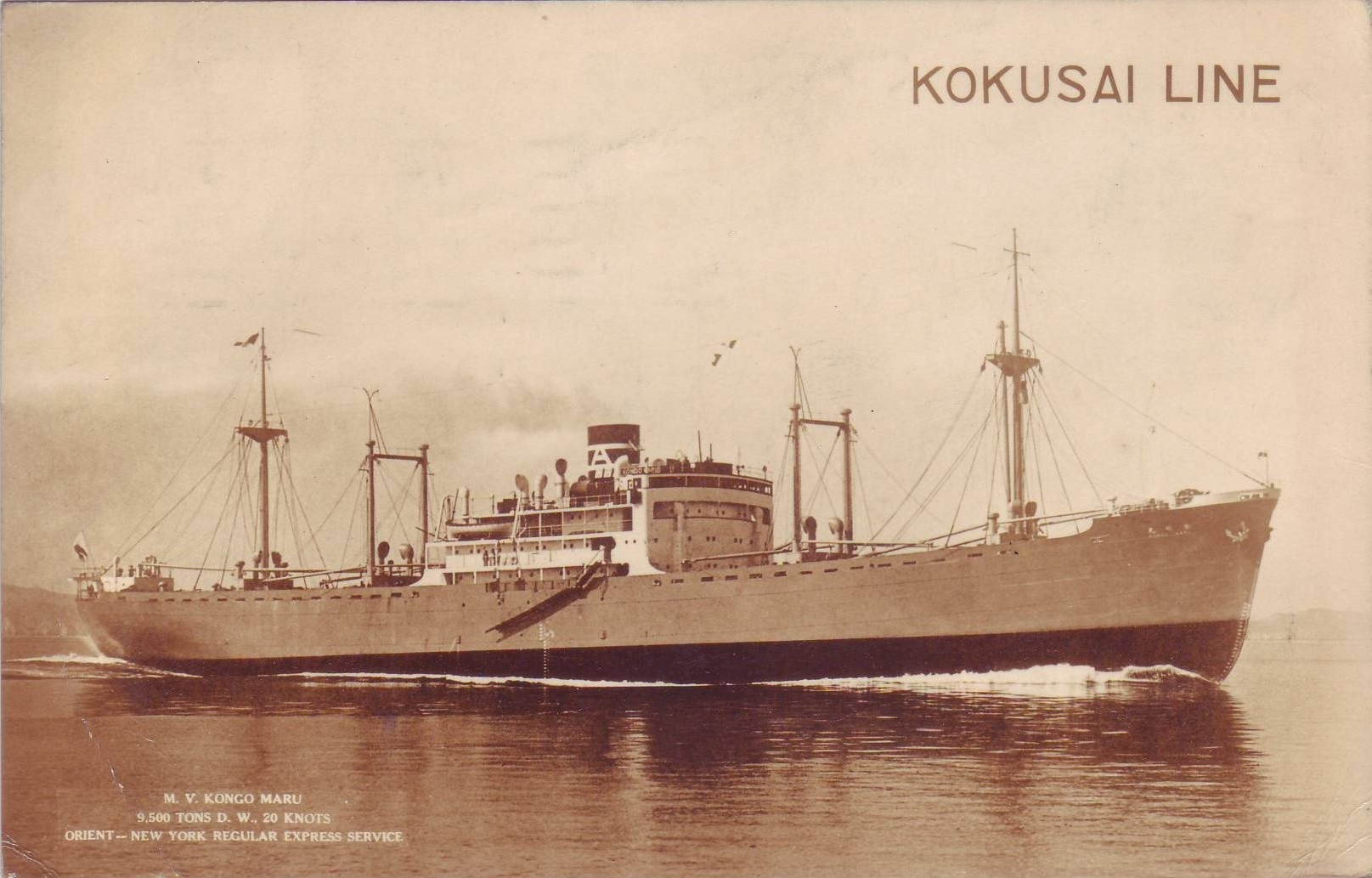
- pre-war Kongō Maru

History

Empire of Japan
- Name: Kongō Maru
- Namesake: Kongō
- Owner: Kokusai Kisen Kabushiki Kaisha (1935–1941); Imperial Japanese Navy (1941–1942)
- Builder: Harima Shibuilding and Co., Japan
- Laid down: 22 February 1934
- Launched: 7 December 1934
- Commissioned: 5 March 1935
- Stricken: 20 March 1942
- Fate: Sunk by US aircraft, 10 March 1942

General characteristics
- Tonnage: 7,043 GRT
- Displacement: 8,624 long tons (8,762 t)
- Length: 453.5 feet (138.2 m)
- Beam: 60.7 feet (18.5 m)
- Draught: 30.8 feet (9.4 m)
- Propulsion: 1 × Kawasaki MAN diesel engines; 9,048 shp (6,747 kW)
- Speed: 19.63 knots (22.59 mph; 36.35 km/h)
- Complement: 50
- Armament: 4 × 14 cm/50 3rd Year Type naval guns, 2 Type 93 13.2-mm machine guns; 2 × 4 533 mm (21.0 in) torpedo tubes
- Aircraft carried: 1x Kawanishi E7K floatplane

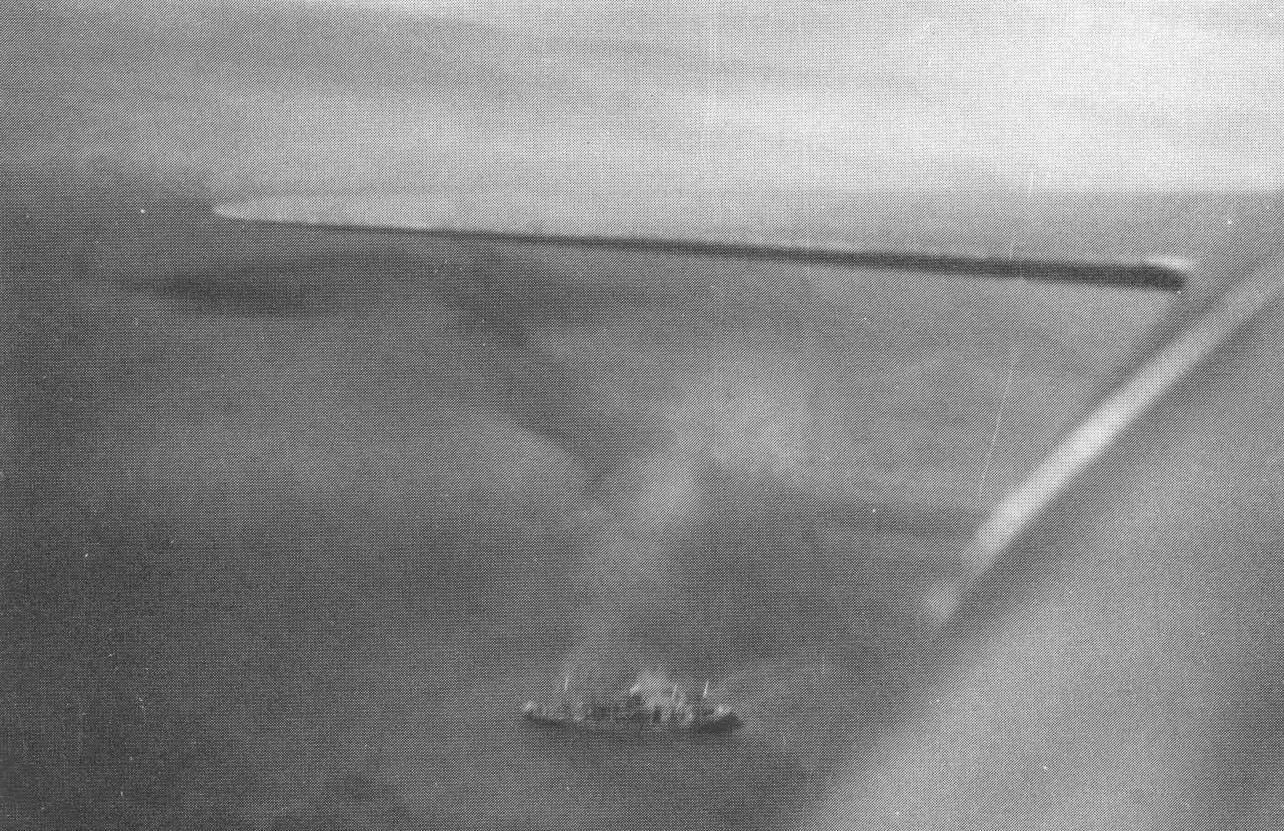
Kongō Maru sinking at Lae.

Kongō Maru (金剛丸) was an 7,043 gross register ton passenger-cargo ship built by Harima Shipbuilding Company in Japan for Kokusai Kisen Kabushiki Kaisha in 1935. She was requisitioned by the Imperial Japanese Navy during the Second World War and converted to an armed merchant cruiser.

== Civilian service ==
Kongō Maru was designed for Kokusai Kisen primarily as a freighter, although she had six first-class cabins, and could accommodate twelve passengers. She was completed on 4 March 1935. Kokusai Kisen received subsidies from the Japanese government for her construction, as part of a program to encourage the production of large, high-speed transports and tankers, which could be quickly converted to military use in times of conflict. She made her maiden voyage from Kobe to Penang via the Philippines on 8 March 1935.

From January 1937, Kongō Maru was leased to Nippon Yusen, and operated on trade routes to the eastern coast of North America via the Panama Canal. She set a speed record for crossing the Pacific Ocean in nine days, 10 hours in 1939 and continued to be operated on this route until August 1941.

== Military service ==
On 6 August 1941, Kongō Maru was requisitioned by the Imperial Japanese Navy and was converted to an armed merchant cruiser at the Harima Shipyards at Aioi. Single mount 14 cm/50 3rd Year Type naval guns were installed at her bow and stern, as were two Type 93 13.2-mm machine guns and two 533 mm (21.0 in) torpedo tubes. Her conversion was completed on 14 October and she was assigned to the IJN 4th Fleet’s "South Seas Force" and deployed to Truk. At the time of the attack on Pearl Harbor, Kongō Maru was at Kwajalein, from which she deployed as part of the Japanese task force in the first attempt to invade Wake Island on 8 December 1941. She was bombed by USMC F4F Wildcat aircraft using depth charges, and caught fire. The fires were brought under control and she returned to Kwajalein. She later participated in the second attack on Wake Island on 21 December 1941, which succeeded in taking the island. After the battle, Kongō Maru was sent via Saipan, Truk and Guam to participate in the battle of Rabaul on 22 January 1942.

During the invasion of Lae-Salamaua on 8 March 1942, Kongō Maru transported elements of the Japanese Special Naval Landing Forces to Huon Gulf in what is now eastern Papua-New Guinea. While still at Huon Gulf of 10 March 1942, Kongō Maru was bombed and sunk by aircraft from the United States Navy aircraft carriers USS Lexington and USS Yorktown at 06°49′S 147°02′E. She was removed from the navy list on 20 March 1942.

== See also ==
Foreign commerce and shipping of Empire of Japan
