= Hardin Run =

Tributary of the Ohio River

Hardin Run Tributary to Ohio River
- Location of Hardin Run mouth Hardin Run (the United States)

Location
- Country: United States
- State: West Virginia
- County: Hancock

Physical characteristics
- Source: North Fork Kings Creek divide
  - location: about 3.5 miles southeast of New Manchester, West Virginia
  - coordinates: 40°31′02″N 080°31′27″W
  - elevation: 1,100 ft (340 m)
- Mouth: Ohio River
  - location: New Cumberland, West Virginia
  - coordinates: 40°30′03″N 080°36′45″W
  - elevation: 644 ft (196 m)
- Length: 5.64 mi (9.08 km)
- Basin size: 7.73 square miles (20.0 km^{2})
- Discharge
  - location: Ohio River
  - average: 7.41 cu ft/s (0.210 m^{3}/s) at mouth with Ohio River

Basin features
- Progression: Ohio River → Mississippi River → Gulf of Mexico
- River system: Ohio River
- Tributaries
  - left: unnamed tributaries
  - right: Langfitt Run; Herron Run
- Bridges: WV 2(Hardin Run Road) (x3), Webster Lane, WV 2(Hardin Run Road) (x3), Sedgewick Street, Fillmore Street, WV 2

Hardin Run is a 5.64 mi (9.08 km) long 2nd order tributary to the Ohio River in Hancock County, West Virginia. This is the only stream of this name in the United States.

== Variant names ==
According to the Geographic Names Information System, it has also been known historically as:

- Hardins Run

== Course ==
Hardin Run rises about 3.5 miles (5.6 km) southeast of New Manchester, West Virginia, in Hancock County and then flows generally west-southwest to join the Ohio River at New Cumberland.

== Watershed ==
Hardin Run drains 7.73 square miles (20.0 km^{2}) of area, receives about 38.0 inches per year (97 cm/year) of precipitation, has a wetness index of 298.97, and is about 73% forested.

== See also ==
- List of rivers of West Virginia
