= Whiteoak Run (Tomlinson Run tributary) =

Stream in West Virginia, USA

Whiteoak Run Tributary to Tomlinson Run
- Location of Whiteoak Run mouth Whiteoak Run (Tomlinson Run tributary) (the United States)

Location
- Country: United States
- State: West Virginia
- County: Hancock

Physical characteristics
- Source: Congo Run divide
  - location: about 0.5 miles east of Lennyville, West Virginia
  - coordinates: 40°35′35″N 080°36′23″W
  - elevation: 1,100 ft (340 m)
- Mouth: Tomlinson Run
  - location: about 1.5 miles northeast of Moscow, West Virginia
  - coordinates: 40°34′00″N 080°37′29″W
  - elevation: 886 ft (270 m)
- Length: 3.82 mi (6.15 km)
- Basin size: 3.69 square miles (9.6 km^{2})
- Discharge
  - location: Tomlinson Run
  - average: 3.55 cu ft/s (0.101 m^{3}/s) at mouth with Tomlinson Run

Basin features
- Progression: Tomlinson Run → Ohio River → Mississippi River → Gulf of Mexico
- River system: Ohio River
- Tributaries
  - left: unnamed tributaties
  - right: unnamed tributaries
- Bridges: Congo Arroyo Road, White Oak Run Road, Race Track Road, White Oak Run Road, WV 34

Whiteoak Run is a 3.82 mi (6.15 km) long 2nd order tributary to Tomlinson Run in Hancock County, West Virginia.

== Course ==
Whiteoak Run rises about 0.5 miles east of Lennyville, West Virginia, in Hancock County and then flows generally south to join Tomlinson Run at about 1.5 miles northeast of Moscow.

== Watershed ==
Whiteoak Run drains 3.55 square miles (9.2 km^{2}) of area, receives about 37.7 in/year of precipitation, has a wetness index of 314.57, and is about 68% forested.

== See also ==
- List of rivers of West Virginia
