= Mercer Run =

Stream in West Virginia, USA

Mercer Run Tributary to North Fork Tomlinson Run
- Location of Mercer Run mouth Mercer Run (the United States)

Location
- Country: United States
- State: West Virginia
- County: Hancock

Physical characteristics
- Source: Cunningham Run divide
  - location: about 4 miles south of Newell, West Virginia
  - coordinates: 40°35′12″N 080°35′22″W
  - elevation: 1,170 ft (360 m)
- Mouth: North Fork Tomlinson Run
  - location: about 2.5 miles north of New Manchester, West Virginia
  - coordinates: 40°33′30″N 080°34′23″W
  - elevation: 974 ft (297 m)
- Length: 2.22 mi (3.57 km)
- Basin size: 1.45 square miles (3.8 km^{2})
- Discharge
  - location: North Fork Tomlinson Run
  - average: 1.46 cu ft/s (0.041 m^{3}/s) at mouth with North Fork Tomlinson Run

Basin features
- Progression: North Fork Tomlinson Run → Tomlinson Run → Ohio River → Mississippi River → Gulf of Mexico
- River system: Ohio River
- Tributaries
  - left: unnamed tributaries
  - right: unnamed tributaries
- Bridges: WV 208, WV 10, Quail Drive

Mercer Run is a 2.22 mi (3.57 km) long 1st order tributary to North Fork Tomlinson Run in Hancock County, West Virginia. This is the only stream of this name in the United States.

== Course ==
Mercer Run rises about 4 miles south of Newell, West Virginia, in Hancock County and then flows south to join North Fork Tomlinson Run about 2.5 miles north of New Manchester.

== Watershed ==
Mercer Run drains 1.45 square miles (3.8 km^{2}) of area, receives about 37.9 in/year of precipitation, has a wetness index of 299.58, and is about 63% forested.

== See also ==
- List of rivers of West Virginia
