= Lick Run (Kings Creek tributary) =

Stream in West Virginia, USA

Lick Run Tributary to Kings Creek
- Location of Lick Run mouth Lick Run (Kings Creek tributary) (the United States)

Location
- Country: United States
- State: West Virginia
- County: Hancock

Physical characteristics
- Source: North Fork Kings Creek divide
  - location: about 3 miles northeast of Sun Valley, West Virginia
  - coordinates: 40°27′24″N 080°31′43″W
  - elevation: 1,120 ft (340 m)
- Mouth: Kings Creek
  - location: about 1 mile northeast of Weirton, West Virginia
  - coordinates: 40°25′41″N 080°32′13″W
  - elevation: 791 ft (241 m)
- Length: 2.02 mi (3.25 km)
- Basin size: 1.21 square miles (3.1 km^{2})
- Discharge
  - location: Kings Creek
  - average: 1.55 cu ft/s (0.044 m^{3}/s) at mouth with Kings Creek

Basin features
- Progression: Kings Creek → Ohio River → Mississippi River → Gulf of Mexico
- River system: Ohio River
- Tributaries
  - left: unnamed tributaries
  - right: unnamed tributaries
- Bridges: Lick Run Road (x3), WV 1

Lick Run is a 2.02 mi (3.25 km) long 1st order tributary to Kings Creek in Hancock County, West Virginia.

== Course ==
Lick Run rises about 3 miles northeast of Sun Valley, West Virginia, in Hancock County, West Virginia and then flows south to join Kings Creek about 1 mile northeast of Weirton.

== Watershed ==
Lick Run drains 1.37 square miles (3.5 km^{2}) of area, receives about 39.3 in/year of precipitation, has a wetness index of 285.38, and is about 81% forested.

== See also ==
- List of Rivers of West Virginia
