= Lick Run =

Lick Run may refer to:

- Lick Run (Clinton County, Pennsylvania), a Pennsylvania Scenic River
- Lick Run (Little Fishing Creek), a stream in Columbia County, Pennsylvania
- Lick Run (Peters Creek), a tributary of Peters Creek near Pittsburgh and the birthplace of Nellie Bly
- Lick Run (Roaring Creek), a stream in Columbia County, Pennsylvania
- Lick Run (West Branch Susquehanna River), a stream in Clearfield County, Pennsylvania
- Lick Run (Youghiogheny River tributary), a stream in Fayette County, Pennsylvania
- Lick Run (White Deer Creek), a stream in Lycoming County and Union County, Pennsylvania
- Lick Run (Sugar Creek tributary), a stream in Venango County, Pennsylvania
- Lick Run (Sewickley Creek tributary), a stream in Westmoreland County, Pennsylvania
- Lick Run (Kings Creek tributary), a stream in Hancock County, West Virginia
