= Langfitt Run =

Stream in West Virginia, USA

Langfitt Run Tributary to Hardin Run
- Location of Langfitt Run mouth Langfitt Run (the United States)

Location
- Country: United States
- State: West Virginia
- County: Hancock

Physical characteristics
- Source: South Fork Tomlinson Run divide
  - location: about 1.5 miles east of New Manchester, West Virginia
  - coordinates: 40°31′50″N 080°33′24″W
  - elevation: 1,140 ft (350 m)
- Mouth: Hardin Run
  - location: about 3 miles southeast of New Manchester, West Virginia
  - coordinates: 40°30′43″N 080°33′12″W
  - elevation: 971 ft (296 m)
- Length: 1.44 mi (2.32 km)
- Basin size: 0.80 square miles (2.1 km^{2})
- Discharge
  - location: Hardin Run
  - average: 0.83 cu ft/s (0.024 m^{3}/s) at mouth with Hardin Run

Basin features
- Progression: Hardin Run → Ohio River → Mississippi River → Gulf of Mexico
- River system: Ohio River
- Tributaries
  - left: unnamed tributaries
  - right: unnamed tributaries
- Bridges: Florence Road, Hardin Run Road

Langfitt Run is a stream in the U.S. state of West Virginia.

Langfitt Run has the name of Ebenezer Langfitt, a local pioneer.

== Course ==
Langfitt Run rises about 1.5 miles (2.4 km) east of New Manchester, West Virginia, in Hancock County and then flows southeast to join Hardin Run at about 3 miles (4.8 km) southeast of New Manchester.

== Watershed ==
Langfitt Run drains 0.80 square miles (2.1 km^{2}) of area, receives about 38.0 inches per year (97 cm/year) of precipitation, has a wetness index of 309.75, and is about 51% forested.

== See also ==
- List of rivers of West Virginia
