= Turkeyfoot Run (Kings Creek tributary) =

Stream in West Virginia, USA

Turkeyfoot Run Tributary to Kings Creek
- Location of Turkeyfoot Run mouth Turkeyfoot Run (Kings Creek tributary) (the United States)

Location
- Country: United States
- State: West Virginia
- County: Hancock

Physical characteristics
- Source: unnamed tributary to Holbert Run divide
  - location: about 1.5 miles north of Sun Valley, West Virginia
  - coordinates: 40°27′43″N 080°34′17″W
  - elevation: 980 ft (300 m)
- Mouth: Kings Creek
  - location: Sun Valley, West Virginia
  - coordinates: 40°26′32″N 080°34′08″W
  - elevation: 732 ft (223 m)
- Length: 1.34 mi (2.16 km)
- Basin size: 1.21 square miles (3.1 km^{2})
- Discharge
  - location: Kings Creek
  - average: 1.29 cu ft/s (0.037 m^{3}/s) at mouth with Kings Creek

Basin features
- Progression: Kings Creek → Ohio River → Mississippi River → Gulf of Mexico
- River system: Ohio River
- Tributaries
  - left: unnamed tributaries
  - right: unnamed tributaries
- Bridges: Shady Gin, Wylie Ridge Road, Turkeyfoot Run Road

Turkeyfoot Run is a 1.34 mi (2.16 km) long 1st order tributary to Kings Creek in Hancock County, West Virginia.

== Course ==
Turkeyfoot Run rises about 1.5 miles north of Sun Valley, West Virginia, in Hancock County, West Virginia and then flows south to join Kings Creek at Sun Valley.

== Watershed ==
Turkeyfoot Run drains 1.21 square miles (3.1 km^{2}) of area, receives about 38.7 in/year of precipitation, has a wetness index of 336.30, and is about 60% forested.

== See also ==
- List of Rivers of West Virginia
