= Tomlinson Run =

Tributary of the Ohio River

Tomlinson Run Tributary to Ohio River
- Location of Tomlinson Run mouth Tomlinson Run (the United States)

Location
- Country: United States
- State: West Virginia
- County: Hancock

Physical characteristics
- Source: Confluence of North Fork and South Fork Tomlinson Run in Tomlinson Run Lake
  - location: about 1.5 miles northwest of New Manchester, West Virginia
  - coordinates: 40°32′34″N 080°35′25″W
  - elevation: 913 ft (278 m)
- Mouth: Ohio River
  - location: Moscow, West Virginia
  - coordinates: 40°32′52″N 080°38′07″W
  - elevation: 644 ft (196 m)
- Length: 4.95 mi (7.97 km)
- Basin size: 27.92 square miles (72.3 km^{2})
- Discharge
  - location: Ohio River
  - average: 26.31 cu ft/s (0.745 m^{3}/s) at mouth with Ohio River

Basin features
- Progression: Ohio River → Mississippi River → Gulf of Mexico
- River system: Ohio River
- Tributaries
  - left: South Fork Tomlinson Run
  - right: North Fork Tomlinson Run; Whiteoak Run
- Waterbodies: Tomlinson Run Lake
- Bridges: Tomlinson Run Park Road, Washington School Road, WV 2

Tomlinson Run is a 4.95 mi (7.97 km) long 3rd order tributary to the Ohio River in Hancock County, West Virginia. This is the only stream of this name in the United States.

== Variant names ==
According to the Geographic Names Information System, it has also been known historically as:

- Tomlinsons Creek

== Course ==
Tomlinson Run rises about 1.5 miles northwest of New Manchester, West Virginia, in Hancock County and then flows generally west to join the Ohio River at Moscow.

== Watershed ==
Tomlinson Run drains 27.92 square miles (72.3 km^{2}) of area, receives about 38.1 in/year of precipitation, has a wetness index of 323.15, and is about 64% forested.

== See also ==
- List of rivers of West Virginia
