= Market Street Bridge (Ohio River) =

Bridge over the Ohio River near Steubenville, Ohio, United States

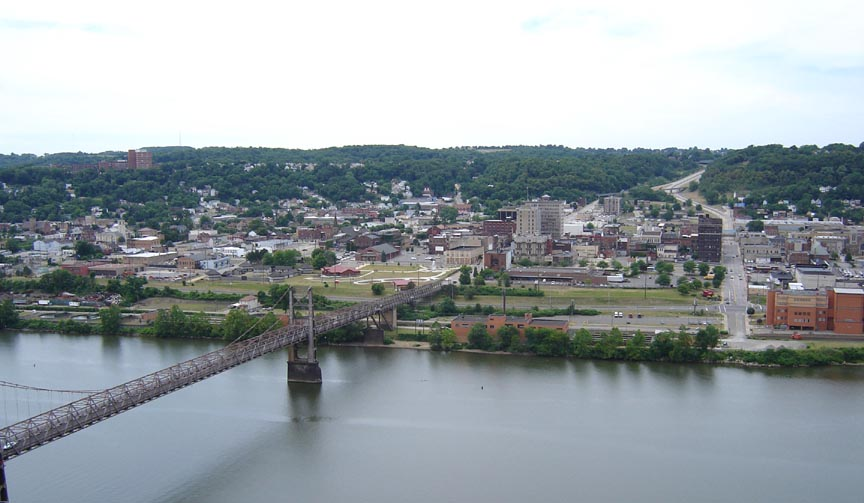
- The Market Street Bridge and downtown Steubenville
- Coordinates: 40°21′28″N 80°36′29″W
- Crosses: Ohio River
- Preceded by: Steubenville Railroad Bridge
- Followed by: Wheeling-Pittsburgh Steel Railroad Bridge

Characteristics
- Design: Suspension bridge
- Material: Steel
- Total length: 1,794 feet (547 m)
- Width: 20.7 feet (6.3 m)
- Longest span: 680 feet (210 m)
- No. of spans: 3

History
- Designer: E. K. Morse
- Constructed by: Ohio Steel Erection Company
- Fabrication by: Jones and Laughlin Steel Company, Bethlehem Steel
- Market Street Bridge
- U.S. National Register of Historic Places
- Location: WV 2 spur, mile post 0.01 / Market St., vicinity of Follansbee, West Virginia
- NRHP reference No.: 100003517
- Added to NRHP: March 21, 2019

Location
- Interactive map of Market Street Bridge

The Market Street Bridge is a suspension bridge connecting Market Street in Steubenville, Ohio and West Virginia Route 2 in Follansbee, West Virginia over the Ohio River. As a project of the Steubenville Bridge Company, it was constructed in 1905 by the Ohio Steel Erection Company, the framework was created by the Penn Bridge Company, and the original steel was done by Jones and Laughlin Steel Company and Bethlehem Steel. The bridge spans a length of 1,794 feet (547 m) with a width of 20.7 feet (6.3 m). As of 2002, the average daily traffic was estimated at 15,000 vehicles. It was listed on the National Register of Historic Places in 2019.

== History ==
The bridge was designed by E.K. Morse, who worked for numerous Pittsburgh steel companies and organized the Pittsburgh Flood Commission. Morse designed many bridges located over rivers including the Allegheny, Monongahela, Niagara, and Kentucky. He also worked with the Roeblings on the design of the famous Brooklyn Bridge in New York City. Morse is also known on an international level as the designer of the Hawkesbury River Railway Bridge in Australia constructed in 1887. Morse died in 1942.

The Market Street Bridge, which was at one time known as the Steubenville Bridge, was the result of a project of the Steubenville Bridge Company. This company is believed to have been created with the sole purpose of creating the Market Street Bridge. It is rumored that Steubenville businessman Dohrman Sinclair had an agreement with the Follansbee Brothers of West Virginia that if the Market Street Bridge was erected, then the Brothers would create a steel mill on the farm lands of the West Virginia side located less than 1 mile (1.6 km) from the construction site of the bridge.

This mill would become known as Wheeling Pittsburgh Steel Coke Works, which is now known as Mountain State Carbon. The mill would benefit from the construction of the bridge, as workers would easily commute to work utilizing the bridge. The Mill has also played an important role in the local economy. Upon its opening to foot traffic on July 2, 1905, the Market Street Bridge was sufficient and successful. Two weeks later, the Bridge opened to vehicular traffic as it awaited repairs to the connecting road on the West Virginia side.

The first two customers at the toll booth were William M. Helms, a local insurance agent, and John J. Dillon, the manager of Altamont park. They both bought their tickets for 5 cents each and were able to cross as pedestrians. The first vehicle to cross the Bridge was that of E.W. Cooper, the superintendent of construction, and his wife. The bridge was constructed to accommodate streetcars and other motor vehicles. In fact, the bridge originally had wood-based floors around the streetcar tracks. However, this caused numerous fires and developers were forced to lay pavement over the wood. In 1917, the Steubenville Bridge Company sold the bridge for an unknown price to the owners of the streetcar line, the West Penn Traction Company.

In 1922, the Market Street Bridge experienced a major cable failure after damage caused by heavy freight cars crossing the bridge. The West Penn Traction Company called upon the services of Dr. David B. Steinman, a structural engineer and major bridge developer from New York City. Steinman was a renowned American Bridge Company developer and was most famous for the Mackinac Bridge in Michigan. After meeting with the original designer E.K. Morse in Pittsburgh, Steinman arrived in Steubenville and began climbing the towers of the bridge to get a better look at the broken cables. Misunderstanding his intentions, observers panicked for fear that Steinman was suicidal. He designed improvements including the incorporation of the open deck design for the Market Street Bridge.

The repairs which began in the same year as the failure increased the carrying capacity and weight limit of the bridge. Steinman may have fully repaired the bridge, but paid the price in his career after being kicked out of the American Institute of Consulting Engineers. Steinman had upset Morse after finding his original design to be flawed and unsafe. However, Steinman did further work on the bridge in the 1940s, putting new braces on the towers, new stiffening trusses, and replacing the wood-based roadway.

In 1928, the Fort Steuben Bridge (another suspension bridge), also known as the Stanton Bridge, was constructed less than 1 mile (1.6 km) away from the Market Street Bridge. The Fort Steuben Bridge connected Ohio State Route 7 in Steubenville and U.S. Route 22 (US 22) in Weirton, West Virginia. Due to a bad inspection in 2007, the Ohio Department of Transportation decided to condemn the bridge. Even though many thought the bridge should have been saved due to its historical significance, It was demolished in 2012.

In 1941, after three years of negotiations, the Market Street Bridge was purchased by the State of West Virginia for $1.3 million. The purchase was ironic due to the opposition from those in Wheeling, West Virginia who thought the Market Street Bridge threatened the industry and the trade taking place between Wheeling and areas to the southwest. Upon this purchase, different repairs occurred to the towers of the bridge.

In the early 1940s, the streetcar industry began to decline due to the advancements in vehicular technology and a complete replacement of the bridge deck to make it more adequate for vehicular traffic took place. In fact, many streetcar companies found it more profitable to become electrical supply companies. With these repairs, the state of West Virginia initiated tolls to pay for $400,000 in repairs. Five tickets to cross the bridge could be purchased for 40 cents. The tolls were removed ahead of time in 1953 when the bridge repair expenses were satisfied.

A new steel grid deck was installed in 1953 and then replaced in 1981. The pedestrian walkway was repaired in 1956 and the bridge was repainted in 1982.

In 1990, the Veterans Memorial Bridge, which many call the "wishbone" bridge because of its shape, was constructed carrying 6 lanes of US 22 from Steubenville through Weirton. Unlike the metal suspension structures of the Market Street Bridge and the Fort Steuben Bridge, the cable-stayed Veterans Memorial Bridge uses the strength of metal and concrete with 26 cables attached to the tower. However, the bridge has had a few structural problems over the years.

An inspection of the Market Street Bridge in 2005 rated the condition of the superstructure and substructure in serious condition and deemed the bridge structurally deficient even with a good rating of the deck. The West Virginia Department of Transportation (WVDOT) planned repairs to the bridge which began in 2009, including structural repairs to the truss and the towers and also the enforcement of the carrying capacity. Work that began in 2010, awarded to Ahern & Associates in a $16,547 contract, included the installation of period lights along the outside cables of the bridge and a new paint and color scheme.

Officials actually polled the visitors of the website for the West Virginia Department of Transportation to pick the color scheme. After a landslide vote of 14,543, dark blue paint on the towers and the cables and dust yellow on the truss were incorporated. The bridge was reopened in a public ceremony on December 7, 2011, on the West Virginia side of the Bridge. In attendance were Governor Earl Ray Tomblin and West Virginia Transportation Secretary Paul Mattox.

The West Virginia Department of Transportation has deemed the Market Street Bridge eligible for inclusion on the National Register of Historic Places, due to its historic design and construction methods. The Market Street Bridge was not the first bridge that crossed the Ohio River in Steubenville. The First Panhandle Bridge owned by the Pennsylvania Railroad was constructed in 1857 and was used primarily as a railroad bridge.

On December 21, 2023, the Market Street Bridge was closed to pedestrians and vehicular traffic. This came after the WVDOT began closely monitoring the bridge's cable suspension system and performing inspections every 3 months. During the inspection 3 months prior to the bridge's closure, its weight limit was decreased from 5 tons to 3 tons.

== Architecture ==
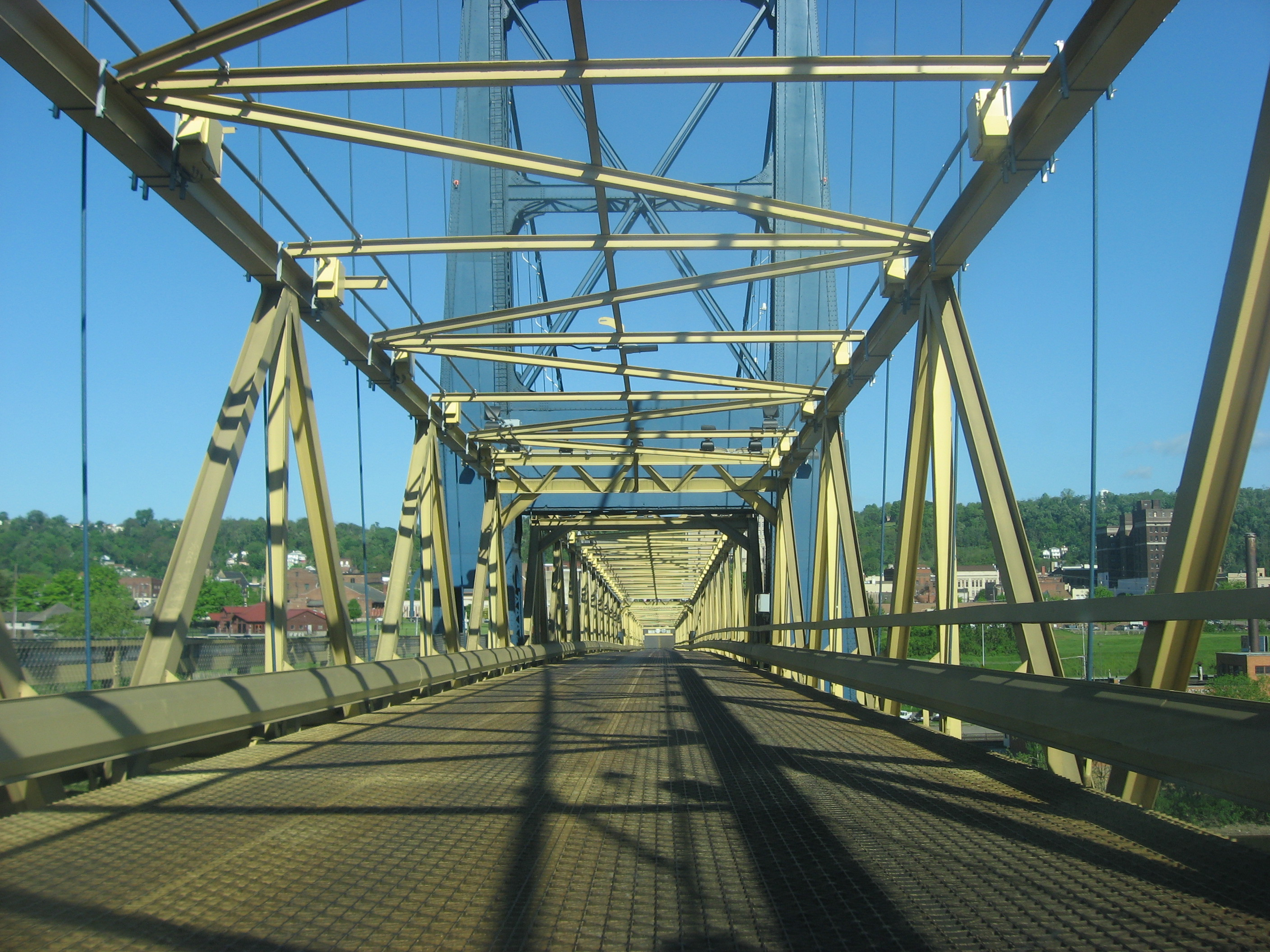
Market Street Bridge deck

The Market Street Bridge is a steel suspension bridge that spans 1,794 feet (547 m) and has a width of 22 feet (6.7 m). The three main spans of the bridge (two are deck girder spans and the other is a five-span steel deck) are cable suspended with a stiffening through a Warren truss. The main span length is 680 feet (210 m). The square, "box-like" steel truss, which encases the driving deck, is called a quadrangular Warren. The bridge cables are attached to two steel towers which stretch 210 feet (64 m) above the stone piers. These stone piers along with concrete stub abutments and steel bents make up the substructure.

The vertical clearance of the deck is exactly 11 feet (3.4 m) and the bridge is estimated to suspend 75 feet (23 m) above the water. The original design of the bridge contained decorative finials placed on top of the towers and elaborate cresting on the towers and portals. These were removed during the numerous rehabilitations the bridge experienced. The exact date and reason for the removal are unknown. A few citizens pushed for the reinstatement of these ornate elements during recent renovations.
