= Ohio State Route 822 =

State highway in Jefferson County, Ohio, US

State Route 822
- University Boulevard
- Current route of SR 822 in solid red, former sections in dashed red

Route information
- Maintained by ODOT
- Length: 0.13 mi (210 m)
- Existed: 1990–present

Major junctions
- West end: 7th Street in Steubenville
- US 22 in Steubenville
- East end: SR 7 in Steubenville

Location
- Country: United States
- State: Ohio
- Counties: Jefferson

Highway system
- Ohio State Highway System; Interstate; US; State; Scenic
← SR 821	→ SR 823

State Route 822 (SR 822) is an unsigned east–west state highway in the eastern portion of the U.S. state of Ohio. The short route was designated in 1990. Its western terminus is at the intersection of 7th Street and the on-/off-ramps for U.S. Route 22 (US 22), where it serves as a connection between the U.S. Route and SR 7, the route's eastern terminus. The whole route is in Steubenville, after multiple truncations due to the demolition of Fort Steuben Bridge.

== Route description ==
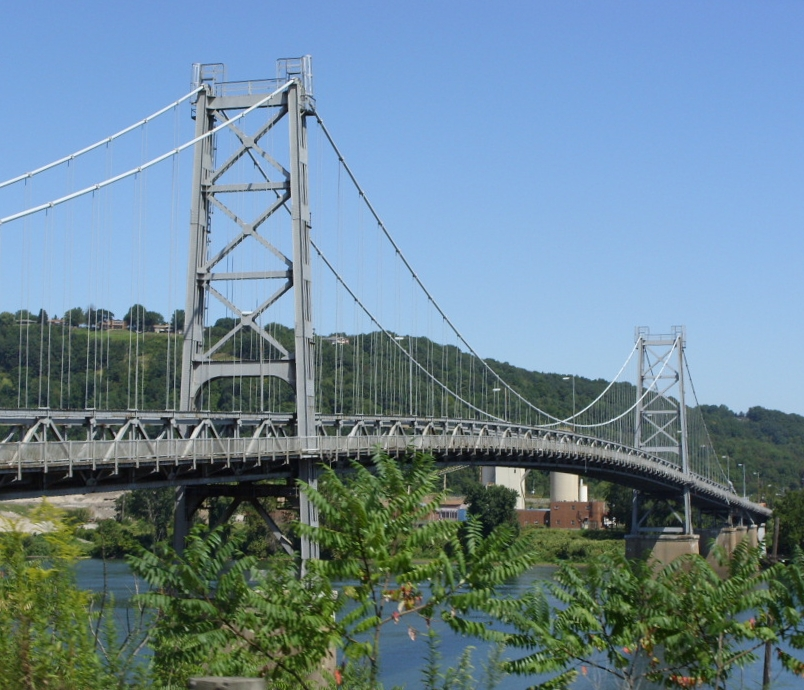
Fort Steuben Bridge in 2008

SR 822 starts at 7th Street on University Boulevard, where it immediately meets US 22 east at an interchange with on-/off-ramps. SR 822 then passes through 6th Street, before ending at SR 7 at a T-intersection, which later becomes concurrent with US 22. SR 822 has open fields and ramps north of it, and businesses south of it.

Around 11,580 vehicles use the route on average each day.

== History ==
SR 822 was designated in 1990 as US 22's alignment was moved to the Veterans Memorial Bridge from Fort Steuben Bridge. Traffic began to drop as the structure of the bridge deteriorated, and the weight limit was lowered in 2004. The Fort Steuben Bridge was closed in 2009, a few years after plans of closure and demolition were announced. It was closed due to deteriorating conditions and limited use. The Ohio Department of Transportation (ODOT) created a temporary eastern terminus for the route at the north end of the SR 7/822 concurrency, where the bridge approach ramps began. The eastern terminus was changed to the south end of the SR 7/822 concurrency in 2013.

== Major intersections ==
County	Location	mi	km	Destinations	Notes
Jefferson	Steubenville	0.00	0.00	7th Street / University Boulevard	
Jefferson	Steubenville	0.01– 0.06	0.016– 0.097	US 22 east – Pittsburgh, PA	Access to only US 22 eastbound, with on-/off-ramps; access westbound via SR 7
Jefferson	Steubenville	0.13	0.21	SR 7 to US 22 west – Mingo Junction, Toronto	Current eastern terminus
Jefferson	Steubenville	0.27	0.43	SR 7	Eastern terminus from 2010–2013
Ohio River		0.39– 0.70	0.63– 1.13	Fort Steuben Bridge	
Brooke	Weirton	0.70	1.13	CR 507 (Freedom Way)	Eastern terminus before bridge closure, western terminus of WVCR 507
1.000 mi = 1.609 km; 1.000 km = 0.621 mi: Closed/former; Incomplete access
