= Turkeyfoot, West Virginia =

- Unincorporated community
- Location within West Virginia Location within the United States
- Coordinates: 40°31′16″N 80°31′48″W
- Country: United States
- State: West Virginia
- County: Hancock
- Elevation: 1,286 ft (392 m)
- Time zone: UTC-5 (Eastern (EST))
  - Summer (DST): UTC-4 (EDT)
- GNIS ID: 1558239

Turkeyfoot was an area in Hancock County, West Virginia, United States. Named after the shape of the intersection of several roads, the Turkeyfoot oil field was located in the area.
