= North Fork Tomlinson Run =

Stream in West Virginia, USA

North Fork Tomlinson Run Tributary to Tomlinson Run
- Location of North Fork Tomlinson Run mouth North Fork Tomlinson Run (the United States)

Location
- Country: United States
- State: West Virginia
- County: Hancock

Physical characteristics
- Source: Little Blue Run divide
  - location: about 4 miles southeast of Chester, West Virginia
  - coordinates: 40°36′00″N 080°31′21″W
  - elevation: 1,190 ft (360 m)
- Mouth: Tomlinson Run
  - location: Tomlinson Run State Park in Tomlinson Run Lake
  - coordinates: 40°32′55″N 080°35′13″W
  - elevation: 913 ft (278 m)
- Length: 6.30 mi (10.14 km)
- Basin size: 10.12 square miles (26.2 km^{2})
- Discharge
  - location: Tomlinson Run
  - average: 9.83 cu ft/s (0.278 m^{3}/s) at mouth with Tomlinson Run in Tomlinson Run Lake

Basin features
- Progression: Tomlinson Run → Ohio River → Mississippi River → Gulf of Mexico
- River system: Ohio River
- Tributaries
  - left: unnamed tributaries
  - right: Mercer Run
- Bridges: US 30, Carl Drive, Stewart Run Road, Berkshire Drive, Hillcrest Manor Drive, Stayman Road, Orchard Road, Cascade Circle, Veterans Boulevard, Locust Hill Road, Holly Lane, Harvest Lane, Shepherds Valley Road, Mercury Drive, Evergreen Lane

North Fork Tomlinson Run is a 6.30 mi (10.14 km) long 2nd order tributary to Tomlinson Run in Hancock County, West Virginia. This stream along with South Fork Tomlinson Run, forms Tomlinson Run in Tomlinson Run Lake.

== Course ==
North Fork Tomlinson Run rises about 4 miles southeast of Chester, West Virginia, in Hancock County and then flows southwest to form Tomlinson Run at Tomlinson Run State Park.

== Watershed ==
North Fork Tomlinson Run drains 10.12 square miles (26.2 km^{2}) of area, receives about 38.1 in/year of precipitation, has a wetness index of 316.01, and is about 61% forested.

== See also ==
- List of rivers of West Virginia
