= Kings Creek (Ohio River tributary) =

Tributary of the Ohio River

Kings Creek Tributary to Ohio River
- Location of Kings Creek mouth Kings Creek (Ohio River tributary) (the United States)

Location
- Country: United States
- States: West Virginia; Pennsylvania
- Counties: Hancock (WV); Washington (PA)

Physical characteristics
- Source: Aunt Clara Fork divide
  - location: about 2 miles south of Frankfort Springs, Pennsylvania
  - coordinates: 40°27′41″N 080°26′30″W
  - elevation: 1,120 ft (340 m)
- Mouth: Ohio River
  - location: Weircrest, West Virginia
  - coordinates: 40°27′01″N 080°36′01″W
  - elevation: 644 ft (196 m)
- Length: 15.23 mi (24.51 km)
- Basin size: 49.67 square miles (128.6 km^{2})
- Discharge
  - location: Ohio River
  - average: 51.25 cu ft/s (1.451 m^{3}/s) at mouth with Ohio River

Basin features
- Progression: Ohio River → Mississippi River → Gulf of Mexico
- River system: Ohio River
- Tributaries
  - left: unnamed tributaries
  - right: Aunt Clara Fork; Lick Run; North Fork Kings Creek; Bush Run; Turkeyfoot Run
- Bridges: WV 18, Maxwell Road, Purdy Road, Rock School Road, Clydes Road, WV 15, Kings Creek Road, WV 11, Kingdale Road

Kings Creek is a 15.23 mi (24.51 km) long 4th order tributary to the Ohio River in Hancock County, West Virginia.

== Variant names ==
According to the Geographic Names Information System, it has also been known historically as:

- Indian Creek
- South Fork

== Course ==
Kings Creek rises about 2 miles (3.2 km) south of Frankfort Springs, Pennsylvania, in Washington County and then flows generally west into West Virginia and Hancock County to join the Ohio River at Wiercrest.

== Watershed ==
Kings Creek drains 49.63 square miles (128.5 km^{2}) of area, receives about 39.3 inches per year (100 cm/year) of precipitation, has a wetness index of 319.56, and is about 71% forested.

== See also ==
- List of rivers of Pennsylvania
- List of rivers of West Virginia
