= South Fork Tomlinson Run =

Stream in West Virginia, USA

South Fork Tomlinson Run Tributary to Tomlinson Run
- Location of South Fork Tomlinson Run mouth South Fork Tomlinson Run (the United States)

Location
- Country: United States
- State: West Virginia; Pennsylvania
- County: Hancock; Beaver

Physical characteristics
- Source: Mill Creek divide
  - location: about 5 miles southwest of Hookstown, Pennsylvania
  - coordinates: 40°34′04″N 080°30′15″W
  - elevation: 1,220 ft (370 m)
- Mouth: Tomlinson Run
  - location: Tomlinson Run State Park in Tomlinson Run Lake
  - coordinates: 40°32′24″N 080°35′06″W
  - elevation: 913 ft (278 m)
- Length: 6.92 mi (11.14 km)
- Basin size: 11.25 square miles (29.1 km^{2})
- Discharge
  - location: Tomlinson Run
  - average: 11.16 cu ft/s (0.316 m^{3}/s) at mouth with Tomlinson Run in Tomlinson Run Lake

Basin features
- Progression: Tomlinson Run → Ohio River → Mississippi River → Gulf of Mexico
- River system: Ohio River
- Tributaries
  - left: unnamed tributaries
  - right: unnamed tributaries
- Bridges: Pumpkin Hollow Road, Gas Valley Road, Patterson Road, Gas Valley Road, Carson Road, Pittinger Road, Tomlinson Run Park Road

South Fork Tomlinson Run is a 6.92 mi (11.14 km) long 2nd order tributary to Tomlinson Run in Hancock County, West Virginia. This stream along with North Fork Tomlinson Run, forms Tomlinson Run in Tomlinson Run Lake.

== Course ==
South Fork Tomlinson Run rises about 5 miles southwest of Hookstown, Pennsylvania, in Beaver County and then flows west into Hancock County, West Virginia to form Tomlinson Run at Tomlinson Run State Park.

== Watershed ==
South Fork Tomlinson Run drains 11.25 square miles (29.1 km^{2}) of area, receives about 38.3 in/year of precipitation, has a wetness index of 334.56, and is about 59% forested.

== See also ==
- List of rivers of West Virginia
