= Lawrence Run (North Fork Kings Creek tributary) =

Stream in Pennsylvania, USA

Lawrence Run Tributary to North Fork Kings Creek
- Location of Lawrence Run mouth Lawrence Run (North Fork Kings Creek tributary) (the United States)

Location
- Country: United States
- State: Pennsylvania
- County: Beaver

Physical characteristics
- Source: unnamed tributary to Traverse Creek divide
  - location: about 0.25 miles south of Kendall, Pennsylvania
  - coordinates: 40°31′40″N 080°29′12″W
  - elevation: 1,220 ft (370 m)
- Mouth: North Fork Kings Creek
  - location: about 5 miles west-northwest of Frankfort Springs, Pennsylvania
  - coordinates: 40°29′26″N 080°30′35″W
  - elevation: 1,001 ft (305 m)
- Length: 3.09 mi (4.97 km)
- Basin size: 2.63 square miles (6.8 km^{2})
- Discharge
  - location: North Fork Kings Creek
  - average: 2.87 cu ft/s (0.081 m^{3}/s) at mouth with North Fork Kings Creek

Basin features
- Progression: North Fork Kings Creek → Kings Creek → Ohio River → Mississippi River → Gulf of Mexico
- River system: Ohio River
- Tributaries
  - left: unnamed tributaties
  - right: unnamed tributaries
- Bridges: Black Oak Road, Swearingen Road, Noll Road

Lawrence Run is a 3.09 mi (4.97 km) long 1st order tributary to North Fork Kings Creek in Beaver County, Pennsylvania.

== Course ==
Lawrence Run rises about 0.25 miles south of Kendall, Pennsylvania, and then flows southwest to join North Fork Kings Creek about 5 miles west-northwest of Frankfort Springs.

== Watershed ==
Lawrence Run drains 2.69 square miles (7.0 km^{2}) of area, receives about 38.9 in/year of precipitation, has a wetness index of 334.21, and is about 80% forested.

== See also ==
- List of rivers of Pennsylvania

== Maps ==
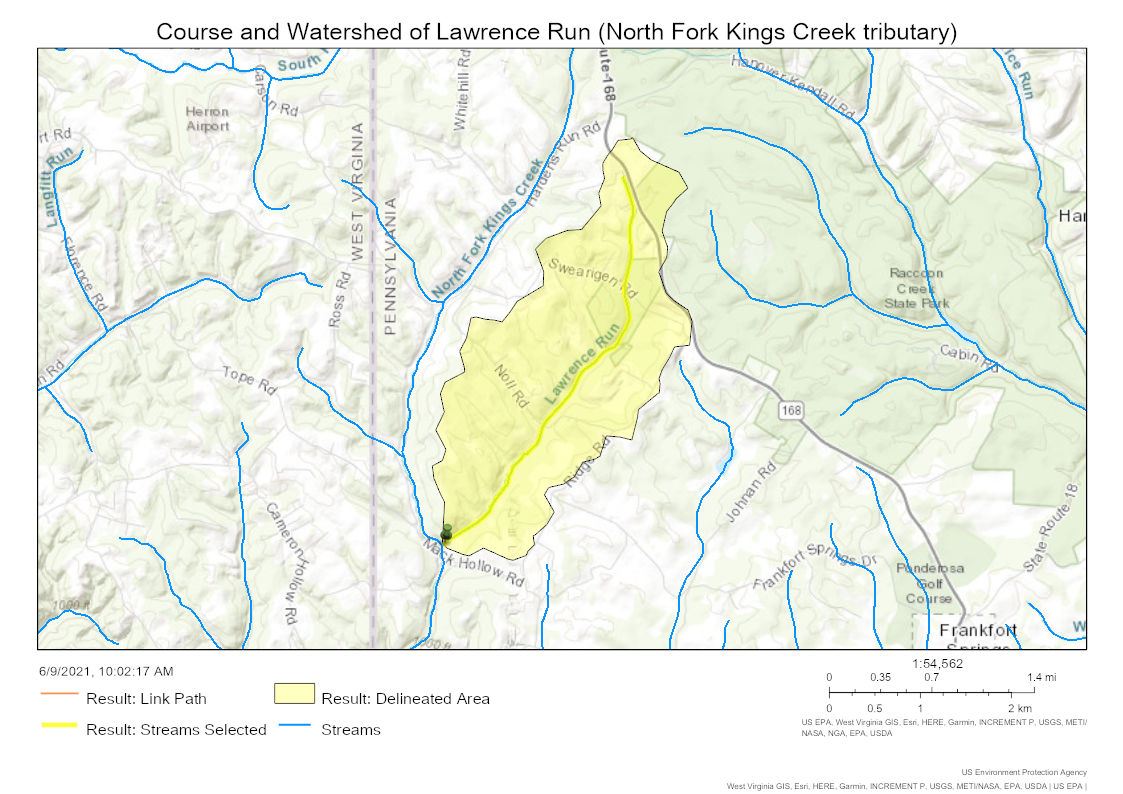
Map of the Course and Watershed of Lawrence Run (North Fork Kings Creek tributary)
