= North Fork Kings Creek =

Stream in West Virginia, USA

North Fork Kings Creek Tributary to Kings Creek
- Location of North Fork Kings Creek mouth North Fork Kings Creek (the United States)

Location
- Country: United States
- States: West Virginia; Pennsylvania
- Counties: Hancock; Beaver

Physical characteristics
- Source: Traverse Creek divide
  - location: about 0.5 miles northwest of Kendall, Pennsylvania
  - coordinates: 40°32′39″N 080°29′33″W
  - elevation: 1,220 ft (370 m)
- Mouth: Kings Creek
  - location: Sun Valley, West Virginia
  - coordinates: 40°26′28″N 080°33′35″W
  - elevation: 741 ft (226 m)
- Length: 9.71 mi (15.63 km)
- Basin size: 15.02 square miles (38.9 km^{2})
- Discharge
  - location: Kings Creek
  - average: 15.43 cu ft/s (0.437 m^{3}/s) at mouth with Kings Creek

Basin features
- Progression: Kings Creek → Ohio River → Mississippi River → Gulf of Mexico
- River system: Ohio River
- Tributaries
  - left: Lawrence Run
  - right: unnamed tributaries
- Bridges: Whitehill Road, Hardens Run Road, Mack Hollow Road, Wick Road, WV 94, North Fork Road

North Fork Kings Creek is a 9.71 mi (15.63 km) long 3rd order tributary to Kings Creek in Hancock County, West Virginia.

== Course ==
North Fork Kings Creek rises about 0.5 miles northwest of Kendall, Pennsylvania, in Beaver County and then flows southwest into West Virginia to join Kings Creek at Sun Valley, West Virginia.

== Watershed ==
North Fork Kings Creek drains 15.02 square miles (38.9 km^{2}) of area, receives about 38.8 in/year of precipitation, has a wetness index of 316.53, and is about 72% forested.

== See also ==
- List of rivers of Pennsylvania
- List of Rivers of West Virginia
