= Congo, West Virginia =

Unincorporated community in West Virginia, United States

- Unincorporated community
- Location within West Virginia Location within the United States
- Coordinates: 40°36′30″N 80°38′9″W
- Country: United States
- State: West Virginia
- County: Hancock
- Time zone: UTC-5 (Eastern (EST))
  - Summer (DST): UTC-4 (EDT)
- GNIS feature ID: 1554183

Congo is an unincorporated community on the Ohio River in Hancock County, West Virginia, United States. It lies off West Virginia Route 2. According to the Geographic Names Information System, Congo has also been known as Hamilton and Hamilton Town throughout its history. The present name is derived from nearby Congo Run creek.
