= West Virginia Route 105 =

State highway in West Virginia, United States

West Virginia Route 105

Route information
- Maintained by WVDOH
- Length: 4.7 mi (7.6 km)

Major junctions
- West end: WV 2 in Weirton
- East end: US 22 in Weirton Heights

Location
- Country: United States
- State: West Virginia
- Counties: Hancock, Brooke

Highway system
- West Virginia State Highway System; Interstate; US; State
| ← WV 104 | → WV 106 |

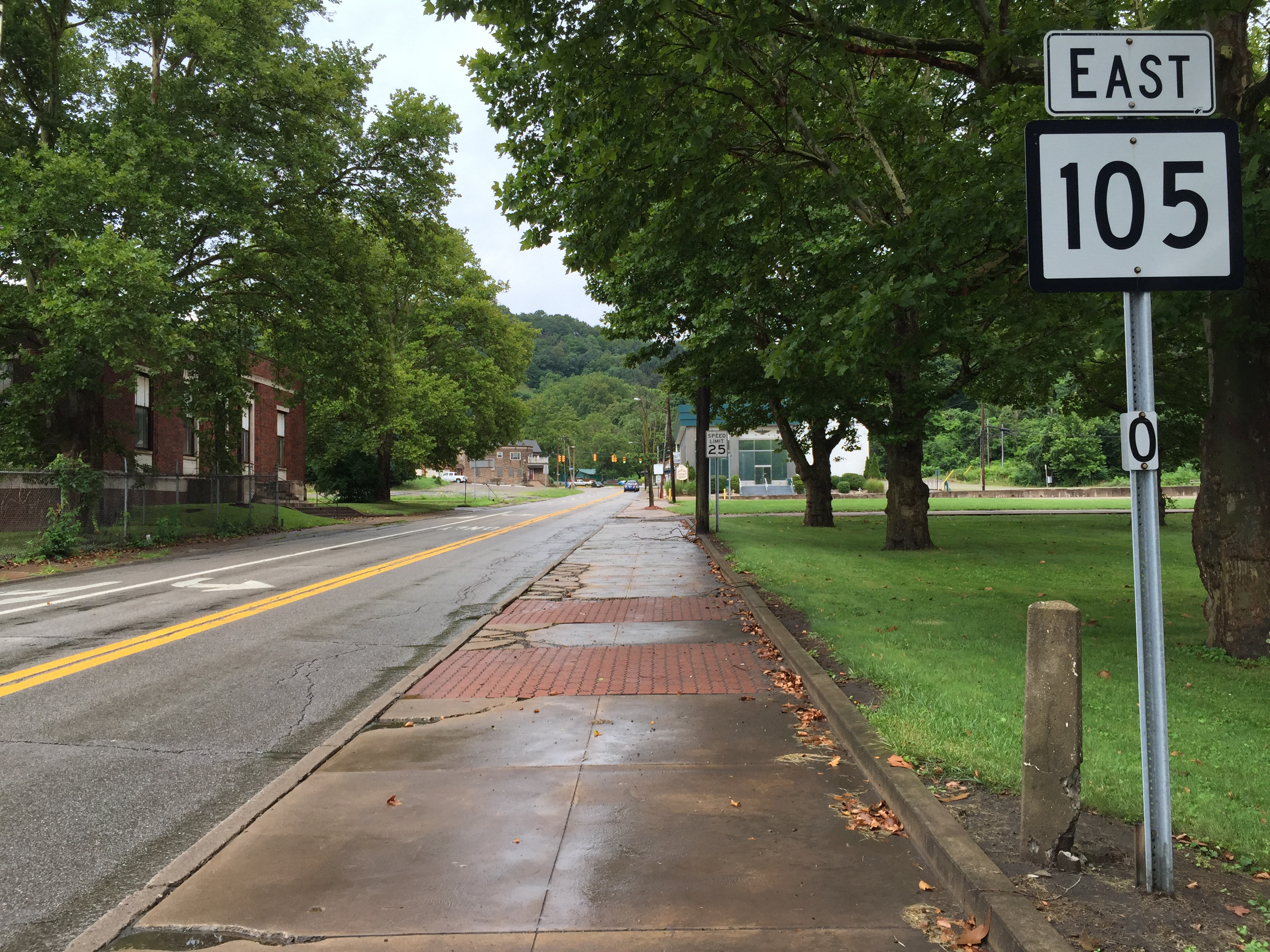
View east along WV 105 at WV 2 in Weirton

West Virginia Route 105 (abbreviated WV Route 105 or WV 105) is an east–west state highway located within Weirton, West Virginia, United States. The western terminus of the route is at West Virginia Route 2 north of downtown Weirton. The eastern terminus is at U.S. Route 22 (exit 5) in Weirton Heights, just 1/2 mile west of the Pennsylvania state line.

All but 200 yards (180 m) of WV 105 is located in Hancock County. The remaining 200 yards (180 m), comprising the U.S. 22 interchange and the north approach, is situated in Brooke County.

Most of WV 105, from the intersection of Pennsylvania Avenue and Colliers Way to the western terminus at Main Street/WV 2, was originally U.S. 22 before the Robert C. Byrd Expressway was constructed.

== Major intersections ==
The entire route is in Weirton.

| County | mi | km | Destinations | Notes |
|---|---|---|---|---|
| Hancock | | | WV 2 (County Road) – Wheeling, Chester | |
| Hancock | | | CR 507 (Cove Road) | Eastern terminus of CR 507 |
| Brooke | | | US 22 – Pittsburgh, Steubenville | US 22 exit 5 |
1.000 mi = 1.609 km; 1.000 km = 0.621 mi
