= U.S. Route 22 in West Virginia =

U.S. Highway with short length in northern tip of West Virginia

U.S. Route 22
- US 22 highlighted in red

Route information
- Maintained by WVDOH
- Length: 6.01 mi (9.67 km)
- Existed: November 11, 1926–present
- History: Completed March 9, 1972

Major junctions
- West end: US 22 at the Ohio state line over the Veterans Memorial Bridge in Steubenville, OH
- WV 2 near Follansbee; WV 105 in Weirton
- East end: US 22 at the Pennsylvania state line in Weirton

Location
- Country: United States
- State: West Virginia
- Counties: Brooke, Hancock

Highway system
- United States Numbered Highway System; List; Special; Divided; West Virginia State Highway System; Interstate; US; State
← WV 20	→ WV 23

U.S. Highway 22 (US 22) is a part of the United States Numbered Highway System that runs from Cincinnati, Ohio to Newark, New Jersey. In the state of West Virginia, US 22 travels 6.01 miles (9.67 km) from the Ohio state line to the Pennsylvania state line in the city of Weirton. US 22 is a major highway within the northern panhandle of the state. Despite its short length, it is an important route connecting travelers from Ohio to the vicinity of Greater Pittsburgh via Weirton. For its entire length in the state, US 22 is known as the Robert C. Byrd Expressway, named after Senator Robert Byrd.

== Route description ==
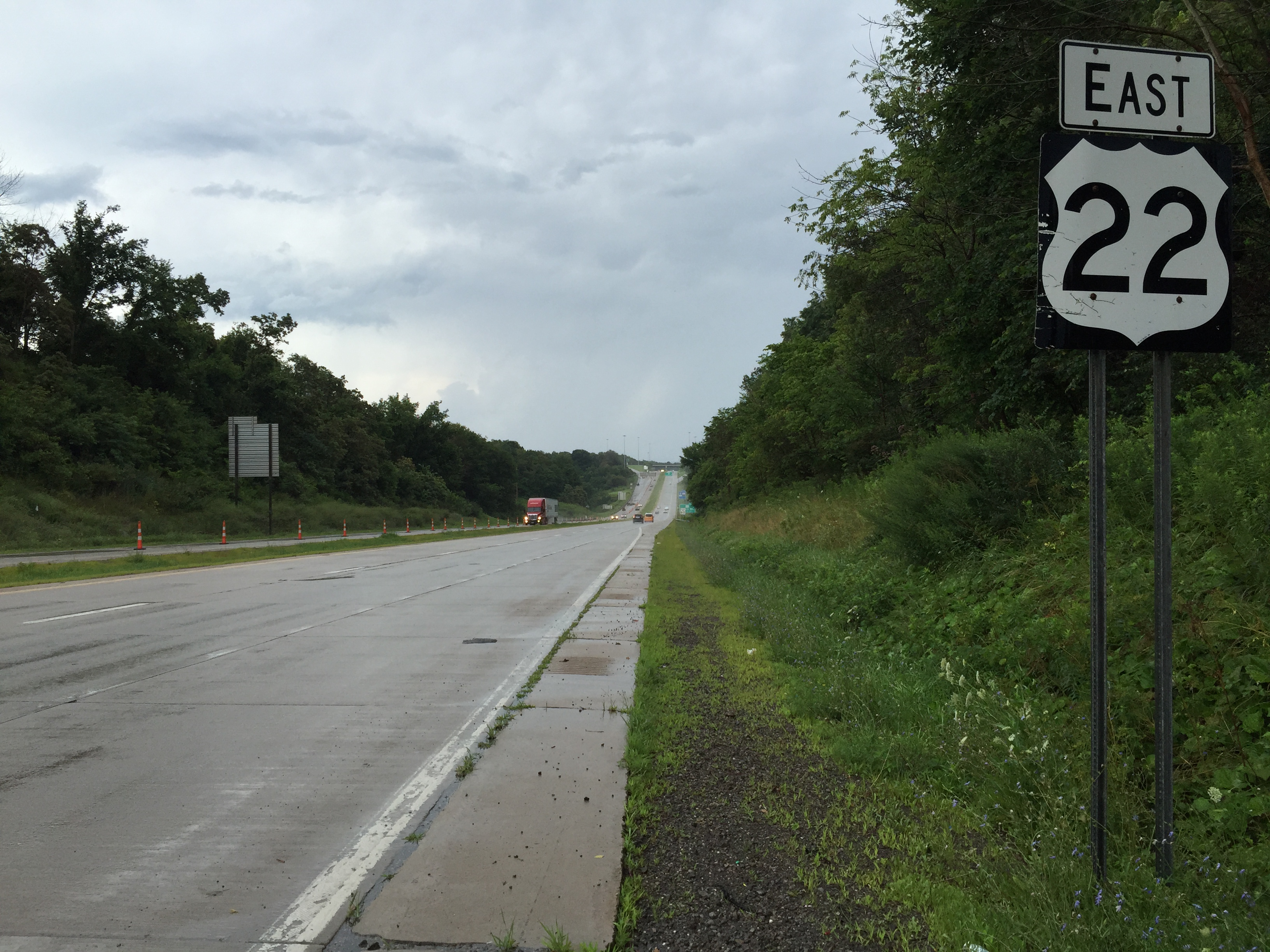
US 22 eastbound past milepost 4 in Weirton

US 22 is a freeway for its entire length in West Virginia known as the 'Robert C. Byrd Expressway. Along the freeway, annual average daily traffic varied from a maximum of 31,192 vehicles near milepost 4 in Weirton. The minimum was 23,025 vehicles near the Pennsylvania state line.

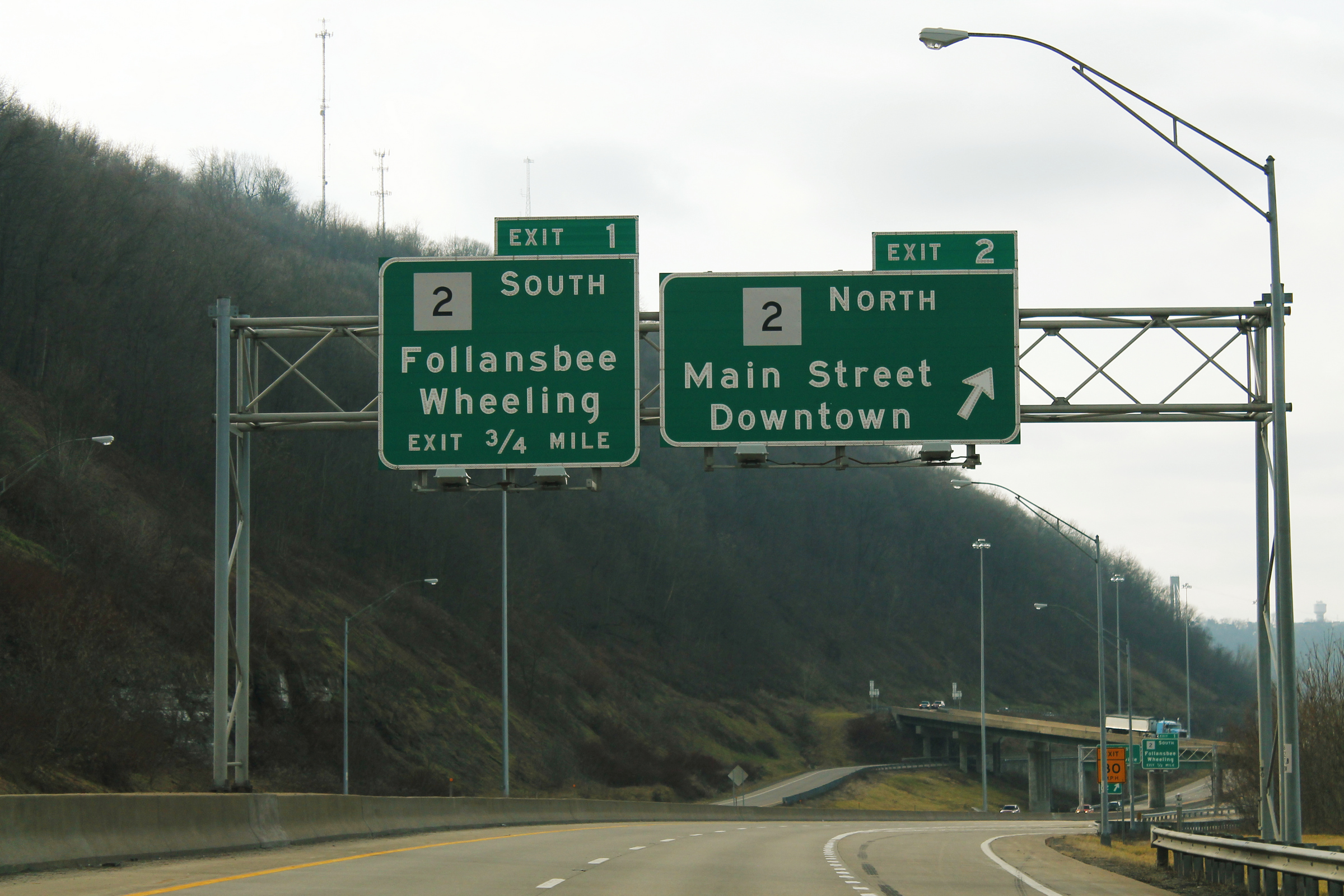
US 22 westbound approaching the interchange with WV 2

US 22 enters Brooke County, West Virginia, from Jefferson County, Ohio, across the Veterans Memorial Bridge over the Ohio River. Upon entering the state, US 22 parallels the Harmon Creek and reaches its first interchange with West Virginia Route 2 (WV 2) for Follansbee and Wheeling. Immediately, WV 2 merges with US 22 and briefly runs concurrently for approximately 3/4 mile (1.2 km). Shortly after the concurrency, WV 2 splits from US 22 to head for downtown Weirton while US 22 retains its northeastward track and enters Hancock County before Brooke County in quick succession. Continuing to parallel the Harmon Creek, US 22 passes to the east of Weirton with homes, neighborhoods, and mountainous hills dotting the west side of the road. Turning to an easterly direction at milepost 3, US 22 reaches its next interchange for County Routes 507 (CR 507) and CR 1 (Harmon Creek Road) before skirting the foothills of the Appalachian Plateau to head back northeast. US 22 turns to an east direction before reaching a partial cloverleaf interchange (parclo) with CR 13 (Three Springs Drive) for the city center. The U.S. Highway, in the meantime, avoids the area and reaches its final interchange, a diamond interchange at milepost 5 for WV 105 (Colliers Way) as it touches the Brooke–Hancock county boundary once more. Shortly thereafter, US 22 exits West Virginia into Washington County, Pennsylvania.

== History ==
US 22 was formed in 1926. In West Virginia, it traveled along a route previously designated WV 25, which directly served Weirton.

On June 24, 1963, the Pennsylvania Department of Highways authorized a four-lane highway that would extend from Weirton to Steubenville. This highway had an extended length of roughly four miles (6.4 km), and the total cost for construction was $3,180,025 (equivalent to $24.9 million in 2024). This was designed to help improve congestion and reduce the number of hazards that occurred on the previous routing of US 22. The project featured four 12-foot (3.7 m) lanes of reinforced concrete, which had to be paved, while the median would be 20 feet (6.1 m) in length. Additionally, four bridges would be provided to help carry the route over and under side roads.

On January 11, 1965, approved appraisals for 8 of the 23 properties in US 22's right of way from the Pennsylvania state line to Three Springs Drive were secured. The contracts for the two interchanges, the Three Springs Drive interchange as well as with Colliers Way, would be let in the spring, and the next part of the bypass would allow US 22 to run from Three Springs Drive to Cove Road. The last part of US 22's route would extend the highway along the Ohio River into Steubenville.

On April 11, 1968, the first phase of the US 22 bypass was supposed to be completed on December 11, 1967. However, due to hazardous weather conditions, work resumed on April 11. As of this day, the highway extended from a point 0.6 miles (0.97 km) west of Three Springs Drive to the Pennsylvania state line. The bypass was located at a point roughly a mile (1.6 km) south of the previous routing which also entered Pennsylvania. The bypass in this area was composed of two 12-foot (3.7 m) lanes on both sides with a median strip 25 feet (7.6 m) long. The median strip would be covered with grass and have no breaks for travelers to change directions. On March 10, 1972, the final 1.4 miles (2.3 km) of US 22 were completed and opened to the public, connecting travelers from the Ohio to the Pennsylvania state lines.

== Junction list ==
County	Location	mi	km	Exit	Destinations	Notes
Ohio River		0.0	0.0		US 22 west – Steubenville	Continuation into Ohio
Ohio River		0.0	0.0	Veterans Memorial Bridge		
Brooke		0.6	0.97	1	WV 2 south – Follansbee, Wheeling	Western end of WV 2 concurrency
Brooke		1.2	1.9	2	WV 2 north (Main Street) – Downtown Weirton	Eastern end of WV 2 concurrency
Hancock	No major junctions					
Brooke	Weirton	3.2	5.1	3	CR 507 (Harmon Creek Road) / CR 1 (Cove Road)	
Brooke	Weirton	4.3	6.9	4	CR 13 (Three Springs Drive) – Weirton, West Virginia Northern Community College	No CR 13 signage eastbound
Brooke–Hancock county line	Weirton	5.5	8.9	5	WV 105 (Colliers Way)	
Brooke–Hancock county line	Weirton	6.0	9.7	—	US 22 east – Pittsburgh	Continuation into Pennsylvania
1.000 mi = 1.609 km; 1.000 km = 0.621 mi: Concurrency terminus

U.S. Route 22
Previous state: Ohio	West Virginia	Next state: Pennsylvania
