= Aunt Clara Fork =

Stream in Pennsylvania, USA

Aunt Clara Fork Tributary to Kings Creek
- Location of Aunt Clara Fork mouth Aunt Clara Fork (the United States)

Location
- Country: United States
- State: Pennsylvania
- County: Washington

Physical characteristics
- Source: unnamed tributary to Brush Run divide
  - location: pond about 1.5 miles south of Frankfort Springs, Pennsylvania
  - coordinates: 40°29′58″N 080°27′27″W
  - elevation: 1,100 ft (340 m)
- Mouth: Kings Creek
  - location: about 4 miles northeast of Weirton, West Virginia
  - coordinates: 40°25′38″N 080°30′43″W
  - elevation: 833 ft (254 m)
- Length: 7.39 mi (11.89 km)
- Basin size: 14.67 square miles (38.0 km^{2})
- Discharge
  - location: Kings Creek
  - average: 15.36 cu ft/s (0.435 m^{3}/s) at mouth with Kings Creek

Basin features
- Progression: Kings Creek → Ohio River → Mississippi River → Gulf of Mexico
- River system: Ohio River
- Tributaries
  - left: unnamed tributaries
  - right: unnamed tributaries
- Bridges: Mylane Lane, WV 18, Meadow Road, Purdy Road, Rock School Road, Clydes Road

Aunt Clara Fork is a 7.39 mi (11.89 km) long 3rd order tributary to Kings Creek in Washington County, Pennsylvania.

== Variant names ==
According to the Geographic Names Information System, it has also been known historically as:

- Aunt Clara Fork Kings Creek

== Course ==
AUnt Clara Fork rises in a pond about 1.5 miles south of Frankfort Springs, Pennsylvania, and then flows southwest to join Kings Creek about 4 miles northeast of Weirton.

== Watershed ==
Aunt Clara Fork drains 14.67 square miles (38.0 km^{2}) of area, receives about 39.8 in/year of precipitation, has a wetness index of 329.03 and is about 69% forested.

== See also ==
- List of Pennsylvania Rivers
