= Weircrest, West Virginia =

- Unincorporated community
- Location within West Virginia Location within the United States
- Coordinates: 40°26′26″N 80°35′57″W
- Country: United States
- State: West Virginia
- County: Hancock
- Elevation: 1,001 ft (305 m)
- Time zone: UTC-5 (Eastern (EST))
  - Summer (DST): UTC-4 (EDT)
- GNIS ID: 1555931

Weircrest is an unincorporated community in Hancock County, West Virginia, United States.
