= Congo Run =

Stream in Hancock County, West Virginia, United States

Coordinates: 40°36′23.5″N 80°38′16″W

Congo Run is a stream in Hancock County, West Virginia, in the United States.

It was named after the Congo River, in Africa.

== See also ==
- List of rivers of West Virginia
