= Fairhaven, West Virginia =

Unincorporated community in West Virginia, United States

- Unincorporated community
- Location within West Virginia Location within the United States
- Coordinates: 40°33′42″N 80°33′36″W
- Country: United States
- State: West Virginia
- County: Hancock
- Time zone: UTC-5 (Eastern (EST))
  - Summer (DST): UTC-4 (EDT)

Fairhaven is an unincorporated community in Hancock County, West Virginia, United States. It lies at an elevation of 1,017 feet (310 m).
