= U.S. Route 22 =

Highway in the United States

U.S. Route 22

Route information
- Length: 648.84 mi (1,044.21 km)
- Existed: 1926–present

Major junctions
- West end: US 27 / US 42 / US 52 / US 127 in Cincinnati, OH
- I-70 near Zanesville, OH; I-77 near Cambridge, OH; I-79 in Collier Township, PA; I-76 / I-376 in Monroeville, PA; I-99 / US 220 in Hollidaysburg, PA; I-81 near Harrisburg, PA; I-83 / US 322 in Colonial Park, PA; I-78 from Union Township to Fogelsville, PA; I-476 near Allentown, PA; I-78 from Alpha to Clinton, NJ
- East end: I-78 / US 1 / US 9 in Newark, NJ near Newark Airport

Location
- Country: United States
- States: Ohio, West Virginia, Pennsylvania, New Jersey

Highway system
- United States Numbered Highway System; List; Special; Divided
← US 21	US	→ US 23
← SR 21	OH	→ SR 22
← US 40	OH SR 40	→ SR 41
← WV 20	WV	→ WV 23

U.S. Route 22 (US 22) is a major east–west route and one of the original United States Numbered Highways, founded in 1926. It runs from Cincinnati, Ohio, at US 27, US 42, US 127, and US 52 to Newark, New Jersey, at US 1/9 at the Newark Airport Interchange.

US 22 is named the William Penn Highway through most of Pennsylvania. In southwest Ohio, it overlaps with State Route 3 (SR 3) and is familiarly known as the 3-C Highway, "22 and 3", and Montgomery Road.

A section of US 22 in Pennsylvania between New Alexandria at US 119 and Harrisburg at Interstate 81 (I-81) has been designated a part of Corridor M of the Appalachian Development Highway System.

== Route description ==
Lengths
	mi	km
OH	244.10	392.84
WV	6.01	9.67
PA	338.20	544.28
NJ	60.53	97.41
Total	648.84	1,044.21

=== Ohio ===
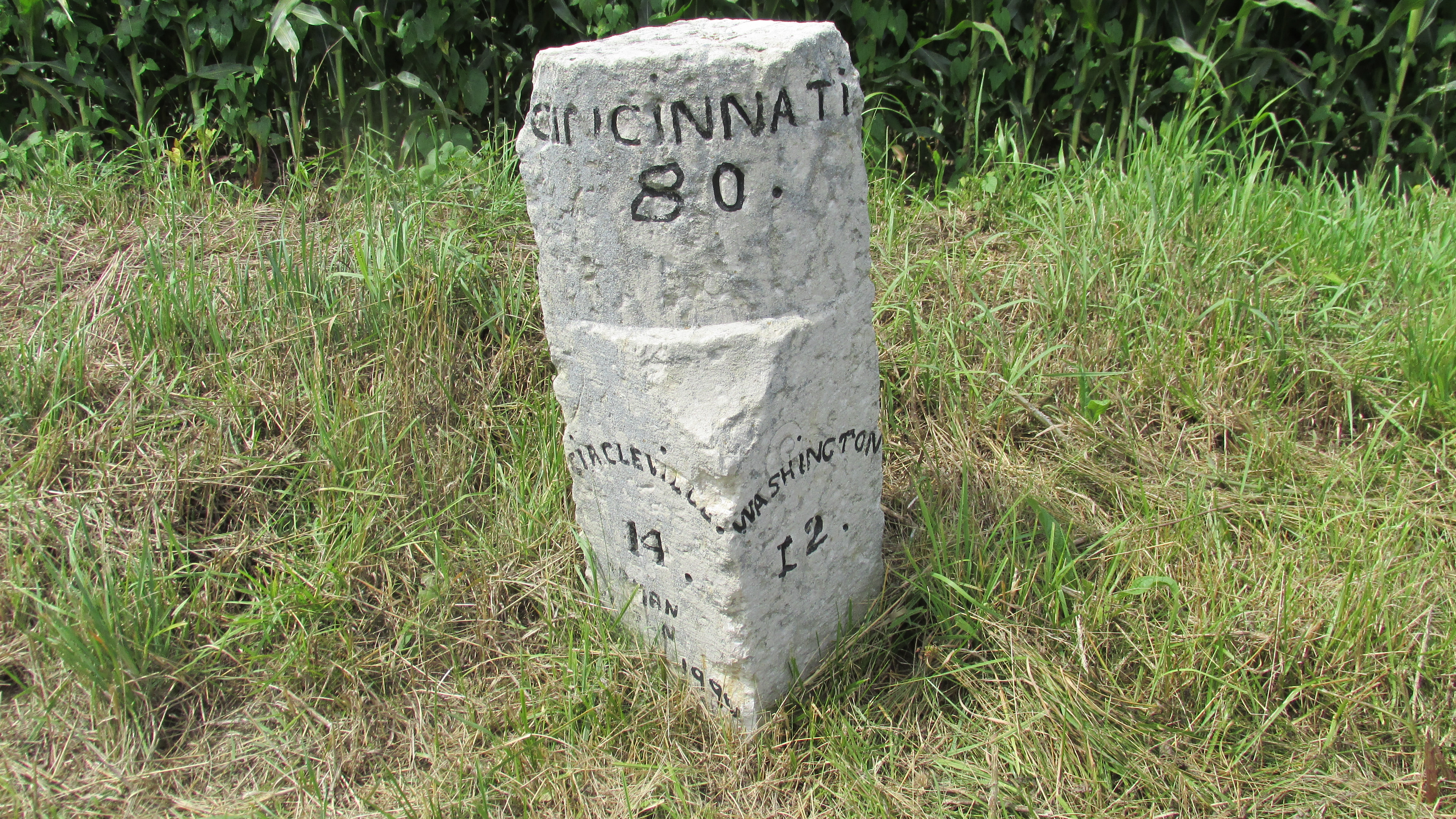
Old US 22 marker located near the intersection of US 22 and SR 207 in Pickaway County, Ohio

US 22 has its westernmost endpoint in downtown Cincinnati. Its eastbound and westbound endpoints are not at the same intersection. Officially, US 22 eastbound begins on Central Avenue (US 27 northbound/US 52 westbound/US 127 northbound) at 5th Street, then proceeds north, turning east onto 7th Street. Meanwhile, US 22 westbound follows 9th Street and officially ends at Central Avenue (signage designating the end occurs much sooner, approaching Elm Street, US 42 northbound).

From downtown Cincinnati to Washington Court House, US 22 roughly follows the historic 3-C Highway which connected Cincinnati, Columbus, and Cleveland. This section is also concurrent with SR 3. At Washington Court House, SR 3 and US 22 diverge. US 22 continues to the east through Circleville to Lancaster. From Lancaster to Zanesville, US 22 roughly follows the route of Zane's Trace, an early pioneer road blazed by Ebenezer Zane beginning in 1796.

Starting just west of Cadiz, US 22 becomes a limited-access expressway for the remainder of its approximately 30 miles (48 km) in Ohio as it approaches and enters Greater Pittsburgh (with the exception of an at-grade intersection with no stoplights or signs on US 22 and narrowing to two lanes for about a mile (1.6 km) east of Cadiz). It junctions with SR 7 for roughly a mile (1.6 km) along the Ohio River shoreline in Steubenville.

=== West Virginia ===
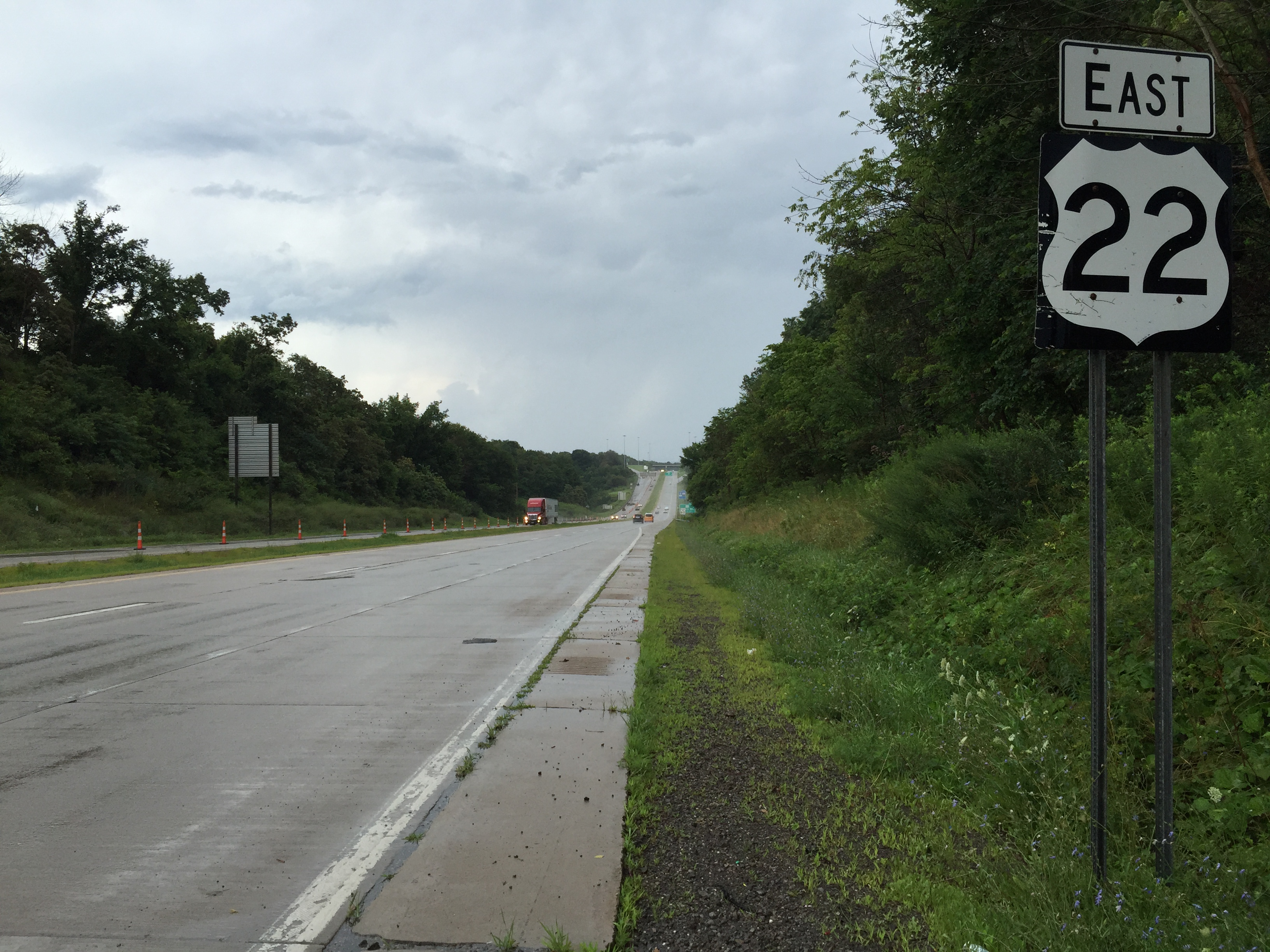
View east along US 22 east of County Route 13 (CR 13) in Weirton, West Virginia

Known as the Robert C. Byrd Expressway, the expressway route that began roughly 30 miles (48 km) to the west near Cadiz, Ohio, continues for approximately five miles (8.0 km) within the state of West Virginia (the highway runs concurrent with West Virginia Route 2, or WV 2, for one of those miles, or 1.6 km) as it approaches more population density within Greater Pittsburgh. US 22 travels through or borders the city of Weirton for its entire length in West Virginia, from the Ohio state line over the Ohio River, to the Pennsylvania state line.

=== Pennsylvania ===
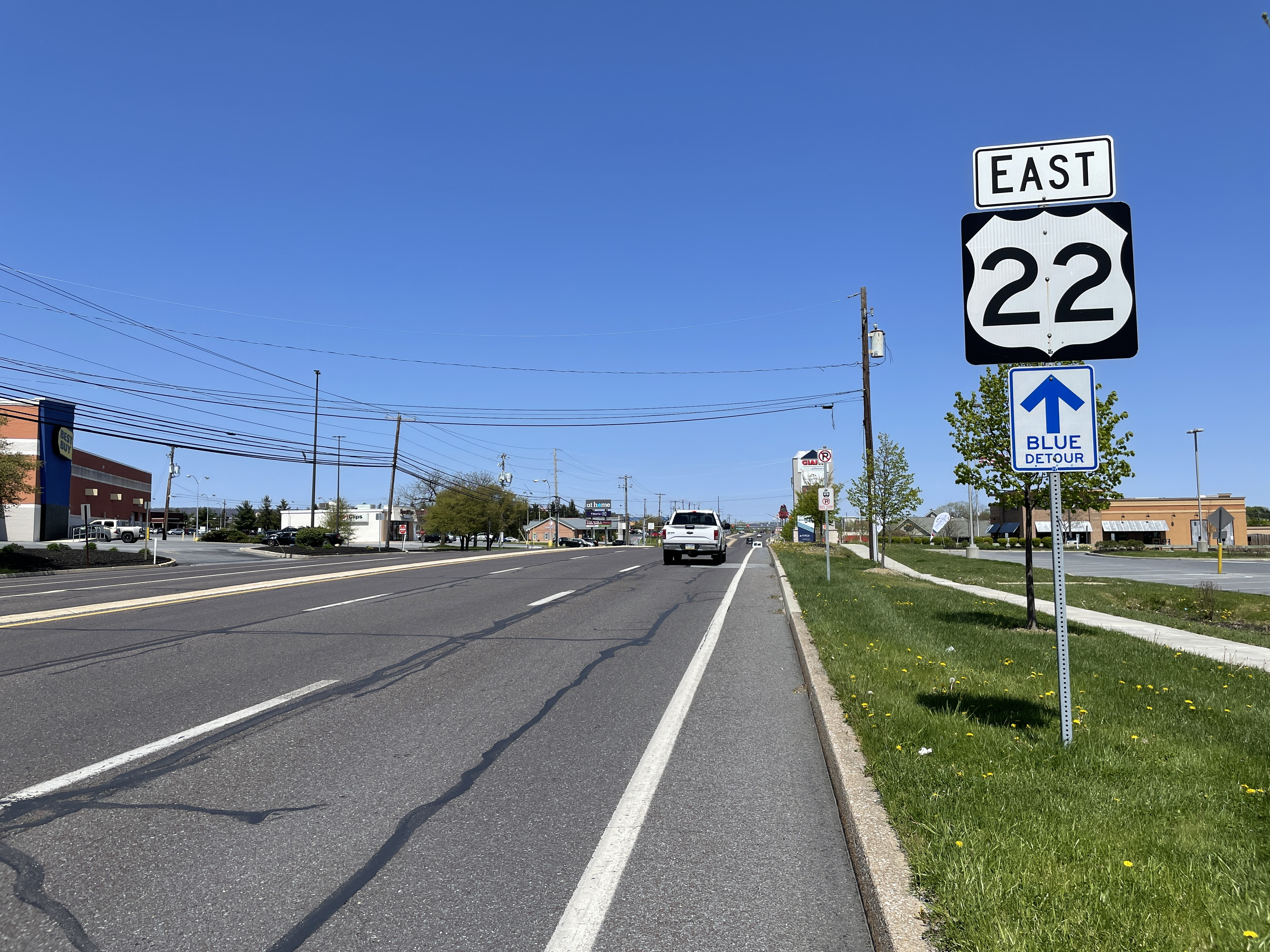
US 22 eastbound in Colonial Park, Pennsylvania, east of Harrisburg

US 22 enters Pennsylvania as a limited-access highway connecting Weirton, West Virginia, and Steubenville, Ohio, with Pittsburgh. Through much of Greater Pittsburgh, it overlaps I-376 and US 30. US 30 merges with US 22 near Imperial and Pittsburgh International Airport, and both highways then merge with I-376 in Robinson Township. Together, these three highways form a busy, limited-access multiplex through the city of Pittsburgh. US 30 then splits from I-376 and US 22 in Wilkinsburg, and the I-376/US 22 concurrency continues to the Pennsylvania Turnpike in Monroeville, where I-376 ends.

East of I-376, US 22 continues east of Pittsburgh as a primary arterial highway. The entire length between Pittsburgh and US 220 and I-99 just west of Altoona was widened to at least four lanes by mid-2011. I-99 links the highway to State College and the Pennsylvania Turnpike. Heading east from I-99, US 22 narrows and becomes the primary highway linking Hollidaysburg and Huntingdon. Near Mount Union, it forms a concurrency with US 522, and the two highways go northeast along the Juniata River to Lewistown.

In Lewistown, US 22 breaks with US 522 and forms a concurrency with US 322, and the two routes travel southeast, mostly as an expressway, toward Harrisburg. At the north end of Harrisburg, US 22 and US 322 split and US 22 runs southward toward the Pennsylvania Farm Show Complex & Expo Center. From there, it turns eastward along Arsenal Boulevard, Herr Street, and Walnut Street to Jonestown Road. Through Dauphin and Lebanon counties, US 22 parallels I-81 and I-78 to the south as a four-lane arterial. East of Fredericksburg, along the border between Lebanon and Berks counties, US 22 forms a concurrency with I-78, which runs to the Allentown area. Former highway alignments of US 22 that parallel this section are collectively known as the "Hex Highway", so called because of the Berks County-based Pennsylvania Dutch families that hang hex signs on their barns.

In the Lehigh Valley, US 22 is a four-lane limited-access expressway between Easton and I-78 to the west; it is dually designated with the Lehigh Valley Thruway in Allentown. The original designation for this expressway was to be I-78, but local opposition to a freeway in Phillipsburg, along with substandard conditions at Easton, forced federal highway officials to relocate I-78 south of Allentown, Bethlehem, Easton, and Phillipsburg. US 22 then crosses the Delaware River on the Easton–Phillipsburg Toll Bridge.

=== New Jersey ===
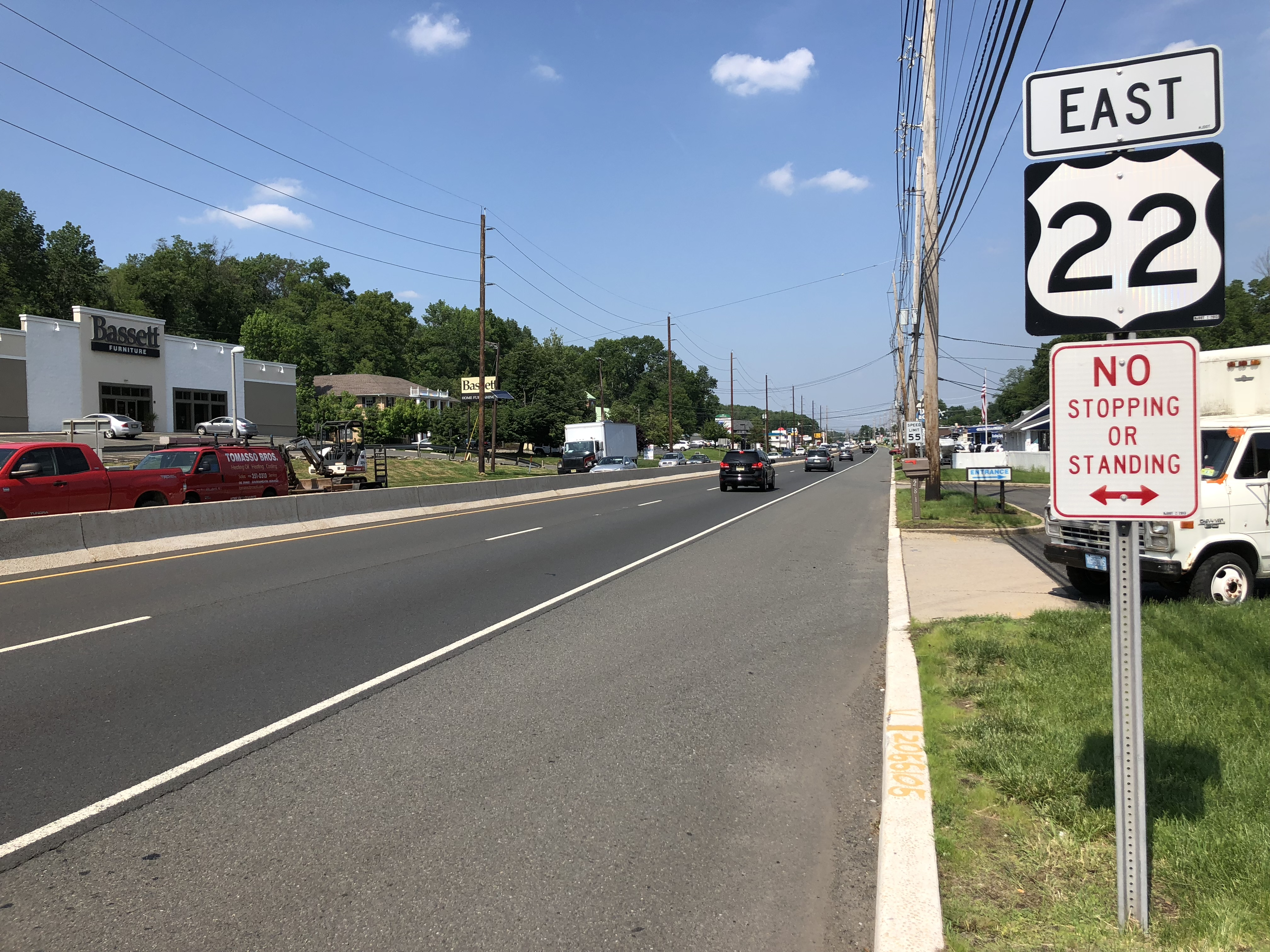
View east along US 22 at Cramer Avenue in Green Brook, New Jersey

US 22 in New Jersey predates and was largely replaced by I-78 after I-78 was built between 1956 and 1989 and shares designation with I-78 from exit 3 to exit 18. US 22 was an expressway in some segments, including the area around Perryville and Clinton. It connects Phillipsburg with Newark in New Jersey.

US 22 has one major interchange besides I-78, that being I-287, although it is not a full interchange, with two missing movements: US 22 eastbound to I-287 northbound and I-287 southbound to US 22 westbound, though indirect access is available via US 202/206

One of two level crossing of the highway happens in Union County in the Union Township section of the highway (the other occurring in Lewistown, Pennsylvania). It once belonged to the Rahway Valley Railroad; the crossing was closed in 1992 when service on the railroad was ended.

== History ==
US 22 is one of the original U.S. Highways. In the 1925 plan, it was initially designed to terminate in Cleveland, Ohio, entering Ohio on modern US 422. In the finalized 1926 plan, however, it followed the current course to US 40, where it ended. In 1932, it was extended to Cincinnati as it is currently, replacing SR 10 and following preexisting SR 3.

Before the Byrd Expressway, West Virginia's segment of US 22 ran from Pennsylvania Avenue at the West Virginia–Pennsylvania state line to Main Street, then left on Main Street through downtown Weirton (aligning US 22 with WV 2), and right on Freedom Way to the Fort Steuben Bridge and Ohio River to Steubenville, Ohio. US 22 Alternate (US 22 Alt.) ran along Cove Road from Pennsylvania Avenue to the intersection of Harmon Creek Road (left turn) and the continuation of Cove Road.

With the opening of the first segment of the Byrd Expressway on March 9, 1972, US 22 was reassigned, starting on the new road from the West Virginia–Pennsylvania state line, continuing on Cove Road where the expressway ended and joining the remainder of the original route at Main Street. The Pennsylvania Avenue segment of US 22 from Colliers Way to Main Street was reassigned as WV 105 and US 22 Alt. was reassigned as WV 507. In 2003, WV 507 was extended along the previous US 22 alignment from Cove Road to the Fort Steuben Bridge and was reassigned as CR 507. The Fort Steuben Bridge, which originally carried US 22 across the Ohio River until the construction of the Veterans Memorial Bridge, was permanently closed on January 8, 2009, and demolished by detonation on February 21, 2012.

== Major intersections ==
Ohio

- US 27 / US 42 / US 52 / US 127 in Cincinnati. Begin US 27, US 42, US 52, and US 127 concurrencies.
- I-75 / US 50 in Cincinnati
- US 27 / US 42 / US 52 / US 127 in Cincinnati. End US 27, US 42, US 52, and US 127 concurrencies.
- I-71 in Cincinnati
- I-71 in Cincinnati
- I-71 in Kenwood
- I-275 in Montgomery
- US 68 in Wilmington
- US 35 in Washington Court House
- US 62 in Washington Court House. The highways travel concurrently through the city.
- US 23 in Circleville
- US 33
- US 40 in Zanesville. The highways travel concurrently to Cambridge.
- I-70
- I-77
- US 250 in Cadiz. The highways travel concurrently through the city.

West Virginia
No major junctions
Pennsylvania

- US 30 in Imperial. The highways travel concurrently to Wilkinsburg
- I-376
- I-79
- US 19 / US 19 Truck in Pittsburgh. Begin US 19 and US 19 Truck concurrencies.
- US 19 in Pittsburgh. End US 19 concurrency.
- I-279 / US 19 Truck in Pittsburgh. End US 19 concurrency.
- I-76 / I-376 in Monroeville
- US 119
- US 219
- I-99 / US 220
- US 522 northeast of Mount Union. The highways travel concurrently to Lewistown.
- US 322 in Highland Park. US 22/US 322 travels concurrently to Harrisburg.
- US 11 / US 15 north-northeast of Duncannon
- I-81 in Harrisburg
- I-83 / US 322 at the Progress–Colonial Park line
- I-78 east-northeast of Fredericksburg. The highways travel concurrently to east-northeast of Fogelsville.
- I-476 in Cetronia

New Jersey

- US 202 / US 206 in Bridgewater
- US 202 / US 206 in Bridgewater
- US 1 / US 9 in Newark
- I-78 / US 1 / US 9 in Newark

== See also ==
- Special routes of U.S. Route 22
