= Fort Steuben Bridge =

Suspension bridge over the Ohio River

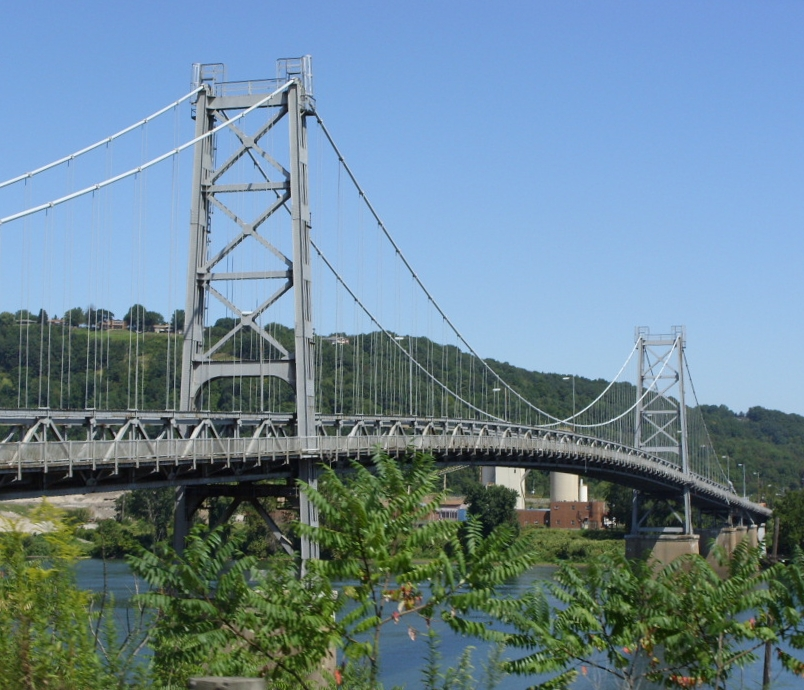
- Coordinates: 40.37982°N 80.61329°W
- Carries: 2 lanes of vehicular traffic, 1 pedestrian sidewalk
- Crosses: Ohio River
- Locale: Between Steubenville, Ohio, and Weirton, West Virginia
- Owner: Ohio Department of Transportation (ODOT)

Characteristics
- Design: Suspension bridge
- Material: Steel superstructure
- Total length: 1,584 ft 9 in (483.03 m)
- Width: 29 ft 3 in (8.92 m)
- Longest span: 688 ft 9 in (209.93 m)
- No. of spans: 7
- Piers in water: 6
- Clearance below: 41.3 ft (12.6 m) above high water

History
- Engineering design by: The Dravo Contracting Company
- Construction end: 1928
- Closed: January 2009 (closed); February 21, 2012 (demolished)

Location
- Interactive map of Fort Steuben Bridge

The Fort Steuben Bridge, originally the Weirton-Steubenville Bridge, was a suspension bridge which spanned the Ohio River from Steubenville, Ohio to Weirton, West Virginia and carried U.S. Route 22 and then Ohio State Route 822 during its existence. Completed in 1928 and opened as a toll bridge, the Fort Steuben Bridge was a more direct route for the flow of traffic across the river; particularly for trucks and heavy vehicles from the industrial area. The Fort Steuben Bridge was weight-restricted in 2006 and closed in 2009 due to deterioration. The bridge was demolished by Joseph B. Fay Co. on February 21, 2012.

== Construction ==
Originally named the Weirton-Steubenville Bridge, construction of the bridge began in 1927 and was completed in 1928. Under the direction of the Dravo Contracting Company's Engineering Works Department, based in Pittsburgh, Pennsylvania, the project was referred to as the "Stanton Bridge over the Ohio River at Steubenville, Ohio". The bridge spanned 1,584 ft 9 in (483.03 m) and had a width of 29 ft 3 in (8.92 m)

== Service life ==
Serving as a link between Steubenville, Ohio and Weirton, West Virginia, the Fort Steuben Bridge opened as a toll bridge in November 1928. The bridge was the main carrier of U.S. Route 22 over the Ohio River, its traffic included trucks and heavy duty vehicles associated with the industrial facilities in Weirton-Steubenville area and along the Ohio River. The Fort Steuben Bridge provided a more direct route for the flow of traffic which previously had to use the Market Street Bridge. As of 1940 the toll for the bridge was 5 cents (US$1.15 with inflation) for pedestrians and 25 cents (US$5.75 with inflation) for automobiles. The toll was removed in 1947, (Note: Sources differ in whether this was 1947 or in the 1950s) when ownership of the bridge was transferred to the State of Ohio. Improvements to the bridge were made in 1956.

By the late 1970s, traffic congestion on the bridge had become a serious problem. A 1978 study revealed that although the bridge could handle a peak 1,600 vehicles passing over the bridge per hour, excess traffic pushing it towards its theoretical capacity of 1,920 vehicles per hour could potentially cause gridlock on the bridge. The United States Senate report accompanying the fiscal 1983 appropriation bill for the United States Department of Transportation mentioned that its replacement had become a high priority. A proposed schedule was for the Federal Highway Administration (FHWA) to receive plans for a cable stayed superstructure by February 1, 1983, and for the project to be approved by mid-April 1983.

Fort Steuben Bridge's replacement, the Veterans Memorial Bridge, was completed in 1990. The Ohio Department of Transportation capped funding for maintaining the Fort Steuben Bridge in 1998 at around $200,000 (US$400,000 with inflation) per year. The Fort Steuben Bridge was weight-restricted in 2006 due to the weakening of the structure over time. The assessment prompted a weight limit; reducing the bridge's traffic which consisted of heavy trucks. The bridge was known to be affected by rain vibration.

== Closing and demolition ==
On January 8, 2009, a dip in the floor of the bridge was reported in the course of routine maintenance, prompting an inspection on the bridge. On January 15, 2009, the Ohio Department of Transportation deemed the bridge unfit for traffic, citing "significant deteriorating changes in the floor condition of the bridge." Repairs to the bridge were not conducted because the bridge was expected to be demolished in late 2009 and the cost of the repairs would not be "cost effective or prudent".

The Fort Steuben Bridge was destroyed in a controlled demolition on February 21, 2012. The Ohio Department of Transportation contracted Joseph B. Fay Co. to demolish the bridge. The roadway and approaches were removed in preparation for the demolition. A collection of 490 linear shape charges were used in 136 locations along the span, totaling 153 pounds (69 kg) of explosives. The charges were rigged in a series of 20 blasts, each lasting only 0.35 seconds and occurring only nine milliseconds apart. The cleanup of the debris was done by River Salvage Co. of Pittsburgh. The demolition was featured in a Scholastic SuperScience article and it included a picture of the demolition spread across two pages.
