= Lick Run (West Branch Susquehanna River tributary) =

Physical characteristics
- Source
  - location: spring in Lawrence Township, Clearfield County, Pennsylvania
  - elevation: 688 m (2,257 ft)
- Mouth
  - location: West Branch Susquehanna River in Goshen Township, Clearfield County, Pennsylvania
  - coordinates: 41°02′52″N 78°22′56″W
  - elevation: 318 m (1,043 ft)
- Length: 11.6 mi (18.7 km)
- Basin size: 27.5 sq mi (71 km^{2})
- Discharge
  - average: 1,760.18 to 59,564.65 US gal/min (0.111050 to 3.757945 m^{3}/s) (at the mouth)

Basin features
- Tributaries
  - left: Fork Run
  - right: Stone Run, Jerrys Run, Flegals Run

Lick Run is a tributary of the West Branch Susquehanna River in Clearfield County, Pennsylvania, in the United States. It is 11.6 miles (18.7 km) long and flows through Lawrence Township, Pine Township, and Goshen Township. Tributaries of the stream include Fork Run, Jerrys Run, and Flegals Run.

Contaminants of Lick Run include manganese, acidity, and alkalinity. The pH of the stream and its tributaries ranges from 4.0 to 6.1 and the discharge of the main stem is between 1804.3 and 59564.65 gallons per minute, depending on the time and location. The drainage basin of Lick Run has an area of 27.5 square miles and is located in the Pittsburgh Low Plateaus Section of the Appalachian Plateaus geophysical province. The main rock types in the watershed are sandstone and interbedded sedimentary rock and the main soil types are the Hazleton-Cookport-Ernest series and the Hazleton-Dekalb-Buchanan series.

Historic industries in the Lick Run watershed include logging and coal mining. The stream is designated as a high-quality coldwater fishery. Brook trout inhabit it, as do various types of aquatic macroinvertebrates.

== Course ==
Lick Run begins near the western edge of Lawrence Township, close to the Panther Rocks and in Moshannon State Forest. Its source is a spring above Panther Rocks Camp. The stream begins flowing west and almost immediately exits Lawrence Township. Upon exiting Lawrence Township, the creek enters Pine Township. It then turns southwest and flows into a valley which gets deep very quickly. The creek then turns southeast and then south after a short distance, exiting Pine Township. It reenters the northern Lawrence Township and continues southeast, passing through Pennsylvania State Game Lands #90. The creek continues for several miles in the same direction before reaching the southern part of the township. It then receives the tributaries Slate Run and Fork Run before passing through the Baney Settlement. The creek briefly enters Goshen Township and turns south, reentering Lawrence Township. It turns east and begins to flow past strip mines. The creek begins to meander is it enters Goshen Township again and picks up the tributary Flegals Run. A short distance downstream, it crosses Pennsylvania Route 879 and enters the West Branch Susquehanna River.

=== Tributaries ===
Named tributaries of Lick Run include Fork Run, Flegals Run, and Jerrys Run. Fork Run enters Lick Run 1.0 mile (1.6 km) upstream of Baney Settlement. Its watershed mostly consists of forest and some areas of mining land. Jerry Run enters Lick Run 2.5 miles (4.0 km) upstream of the latter stream's confluence with the West Branch Susquehanna River. Its watershed mostly consists of abandoned mine lands. Flegals Run is the final tributary to enter Lick Run. Its headwaters are formed from acid mine drainage. The largest tributary of Lick Run is Stone Run, which is geographically similar to Lick Run and joins it one mile upstream of the Baney Settlement.

== Hydrology ==
=== Metals, acidity, and alkalinity ===
The daily load of manganese near the mouth of Fork Run is 180.4 pounds (81.8 kg) per day. The load of acidity near the mouth is 5,764.9 pounds (2,614.9 kg) per day and the daily load of alkalinity is 1,889.0 pounds (856.8 kg). Immediately upstream of Flegals Run, the manganese load of Lick Run is 202.1 pounds (91.7 kg) per day. The daily loads of acidity and alkalinity at this location are 5,871.2 pounds (2,663.1 kg) and 2,020.9 pounds (916.7 kg), respectively. Between Flegals Run and the mouth of Lick Run, the concentration of manganese is 0.7 milligrams per liter, the concentration of acidity is 22.37 milligrams per liter, and the concentration of alkalinity is 7.33 milligrams per liter.

Between UNT (Note: Unnamed tributary) 26087 and UNT 26085, the manganese load of Lick Run is 642.3 pounds (291.3 kg) per day. The daily alkalinity load is 1,947.3 pounds (883.3 kg) and the acidity load is 3,288.4 pounds (1,491.6 kg) per day. The concentrations of manganese, alkalinity, and acidity are 2.53 milligrams per liter, 12.97 milligrams per liter, and 7.67 milligrams per liter, respectively. Upstream of Fork Run, the stream's acidity load is 1,646.0 pounds (746.6 kg) per and its alkalinity load is 1,247.7 pounds (565.9 kg) per day. The concentrations of acidity and alkalinity at this place are 9.67 milligrams per liter and 7.33 milligrams per liter, respectively.

The entire watershed of Lick Run downstream of and including UNT 26085 is considered by the Pennsylvania Department of Environmental Protection to be impaired. A tributary of Fork Run is also considered impaired. The remainder of the watershed meets the water quality standards of the Pennsylvania Department of Environmental Protection.

=== Discharge and pH ===
The discharge of Lick Run at the mouth of Fork Run ranges from 1804.3 to 38028.21 gallons per minute. Between UNT 26087 and UNT 26085, the stream's discharge ranges between 2264.76 and 58079.29 gallons per minute. The stream's discharge above Flegals Run ranges from 7065.01 gallons per minute to 51556.74 gallons per minute. Near its mouth, the discharge is between 1760.18 and 59564.65 gallons per minute. The uppermost reaches of the creek nearly run dry oftentimes during the summer.

The pH of Lick Run at Fork Run's confluence with it ranges between 5.1 and 6.1. The pH between UNT 26087 and UNT 26085 is between 5.1 and 6.0 and the pH upstream of Flegals Run ranges from 5.0 to 5.6. Near the mouth of Lick Run, the pH is between 5.4 and 5.9. The lowest pH in the entire watershed is at a site on Flegals Run, where it ranges from 4.0 to 4.2. In Fall 2004, the pH of Lick Run was observed to be 4.1.

In the upper reaches of Lick Run, its pH is lowest in the spring and highest in the summer.

== Geography, geology, and climate ==
The watershed of Lick Run is located in the Pittsburgh Low Plateaus Section of the Appalachian Plateaus geophysical province.

Most of the watershed of Lick Run (79.1%) lies over sandstone. The remaining 20.9% of the watershed's rock is interbedded sedimentary rock. The mail soil associations in the watershed are the Hazleton-Cookport-Ernest series, which occupies 48% of it and the Hazleton-Dekalb-Buchanan series, which occupies 24% of the watershed's area. 14.8% of the watershed consists of the Gilpin-Ernest-Cavode soil association and the Udorthents-Ernest-Gilpin soil association occupies 8.8% of the watershed's area.

The elevation of the headwaters of Lick Run is 1,200 feet (370 m) higher than the elevation of the stream's mouth. The mouth's elevation is 318 metres (1,043 ft) above sea level.

Although there is little stream flow at the headwaters of Lick Run, there is some slightly further downstream. There are numerous pools in this area of the stream as well. Downstream of the tributary Doctors Fork, there are riffles and pools in it.

The summers in the Lick Run watershed are warm, but the winters are long and cold. On average, the rate of precipitation is 42 inches (110 cm) per year.

== Watershed ==
The watershed of Lick Run has an area of 27.5 square miles. The upper reaches of it are mostly forested, but downstream of the communities of Goshen and the Baney Settlement, the dominant land use is coal mining land. 65.9 percent of the entire watershed's area is forested land and 27.7 percent is agricultural land. 3.9 percent of the watershed's area is developed and 2.5 percent of the watershed consists of former coal mines and quarries. Most of the agricultural land lies on former coal mining land.s

The main roads in the vicinity of Lick Run are Pennsylvania Route 879 and Interstate 80. There are also a number of township roads in the watershed.

Moshannon State Forest occupies much of the upper part of the watershed of Lick Run.

== History ==
Martin Nichols constructed a sawmill on Lick Run in 1845. Another mill, known as Irvin's Mill, was built on the stream by Frederick P. Hurxthal. The Lick Run School was later established near the mill.

On May 6, 1854, the Lick Run and Sinnemahoning Turnpike Company was incorporated. Its purpose was to construct a road between Lick Run and Bennett Branch Sinnemahoning Creek.

Coal mining began in the watershed of Lick Run in the early 1800s and continues into the 21st century. Most of the mining activity has been surface mining, although there has been some deep mining as well. Large amounts of logging were also done in the late 19th century and early 20th century.

== Biology ==
Lick Run is designated as a high-quality coldwater fishery. In 1931, the Pennsylvania Fish and Boat Commission stated that the stream was "one of the best streams in this section of Clearfield County". In 1983, the Susquehanna River Basin Commission did a biological survey of the stream, finding that there were no fish there and only one species of macroinvertebrate – a crayfish.

Trout have historically been stocked on Lick Run. In 1957, the Pennsylvania Fish and Boat Commission suggested no longer stocking trout on the stream below Fork Run. In 1985, trout stocking on the creek stopped altogether. Brook trout inhabit the stream downstream of the mouth of the tributary Doctors Fork.

Near Panther Rocks Camp, the land in the vicinity of Lick Run is fairly open, with bog-like sphagnum seeps. Further downstream, a riparian buffer begins to develop, and remains highly intact for almost all of the stream's length. Still further downstream, pools of woody debris begin forming in the stream. Filamentous green algae was observed on the stream at Panther Rocks in May 2005.

A wetland known as the SB Elliot Cabins Wetland is located at the headwaters of Lick Run. The Clearfield County Natural Heritage Inventory lists it as a significant site on the county level.

Lick Run has a low level of biodiversity at Panther Rocks. In a 2004 benthic macroinvertebrate survey, only two alderfly larvae and one crayfish were observed here. Upstream of Doctors Fork, the survey observed 125 stonefly nymphs, 52 caddisflies, 5 alderfly larvae, 2 cranefly larvae, and a single crayfish. Downstream of Doctors Fork, 40 stonefly nymphs, 22 caddisfly larvae, and two alderfly larvae were observed. At the SGL #90 Bridge, 45 caddisfly larvae, 44 stonefly nymphs, 3 midge larvae, and 2 aquatic worms were observed by the survey. Upstream of the tributary Stone Run, the survey observed 83 stonefly nymphs, 53 caddisfly larvae, 8 alderfly larvae, 7 mayfly nymphs, 1 caddisfly, and 1 aquatic worm.

== See also ==
- Clearfield Creek
- List of rivers of Pennsylvania
