= Herron Run =

Stream in West Virginia, United States

Coordinates: 40°30′07″N 80°35′17″W

Herron Run is a stream in the U.S. state of West Virginia.

Herron Run has the name of Robert Herron, a local pioneer.

== See also ==
- List of rivers of West Virginia
