= Lennyville, West Virginia =

- Unincorporated community
- Location within West Virginia Location within the United States
- Coordinates: 40°36′05″N 80°37′51″W
- Country: United States
- State: West Virginia
- County: Hancock
- Time zone: UTC-5 (Eastern (EST))
  - Summer (DST): UTC-4 (EDT)

Lennyville is an unincorporated community in Hancock County, West Virginia, United States. It lies at an elevation of 794 feet (242 m).
