= Moscow, West Virginia =

- Unincorporated community
- Location within West Virginia Location within the United States
- Coordinates: 40°32′44″N 80°37′56″W
- Country: United States
- State: West Virginia
- County: Hancock
- Time zone: UTC-5 (Eastern (EST))
  - Summer (DST): UTC-4 (EDT)
- GNIS feature ID: 1549834

Moscow is an unincorporated community on the Ohio River along West Virginia Route 2 in Hancock County, West Virginia, United States.

An early variant name was New Lexington.

== See also ==
- List of cities and towns along the Ohio River
