= Sun Valley, West Virginia =

- Unincorporated community
- Location within West Virginia Location within the United States
- Coordinates: 40°26′40″N 80°34′05″W
- Country: United States
- State: West Virginia
- County: Hancock
- Time zone: UTC-5 (Eastern (EST))
  - Summer (DST): UTC-4 (EDT)

Sun Valley is an unincorporated community in Hancock County, West Virginia, United States. It lies at an elevation of 883 feet (269 m).
