= Veterans Memorial Bridge (Steubenville, Ohio) =

- Veterans Memorial Bridge in 2015
- Coordinates: 40°22′39″N 80°36′38″W
- Carries: US 22
- Crosses: Ohio River
- Locale: Steubenville, Ohio and Weirton, West Virginia
- Maintained by: West Virginia Department of Transportation

Characteristics
- Design: Cable-stayed bridge
- Total length: 1,964.0 feet (598.6 m)
- Width: 81.0 feet (24.7 m)
- Longest span: 819.9 feet (249.9 m)
- Clearance above: 17.0 feet (5.2 m)

History
- Designer: Michael Baker
- Construction start: 1979
- Opened: May 1, 1990

Statistics
- Daily traffic: 30,000

Location
- Interactive map of Veterans Memorial Bridge

Veterans Memorial Bridge, also known as the New Steubenville Bridge, is a cable-stayed bridge which carries U.S. Route 22 across the Ohio River between Steubenville, Ohio and Weirton, West Virginia. The bridge succeeded the Fort Steuben Bridge, which was built in 1928, though was still operational until 2009.

== History ==
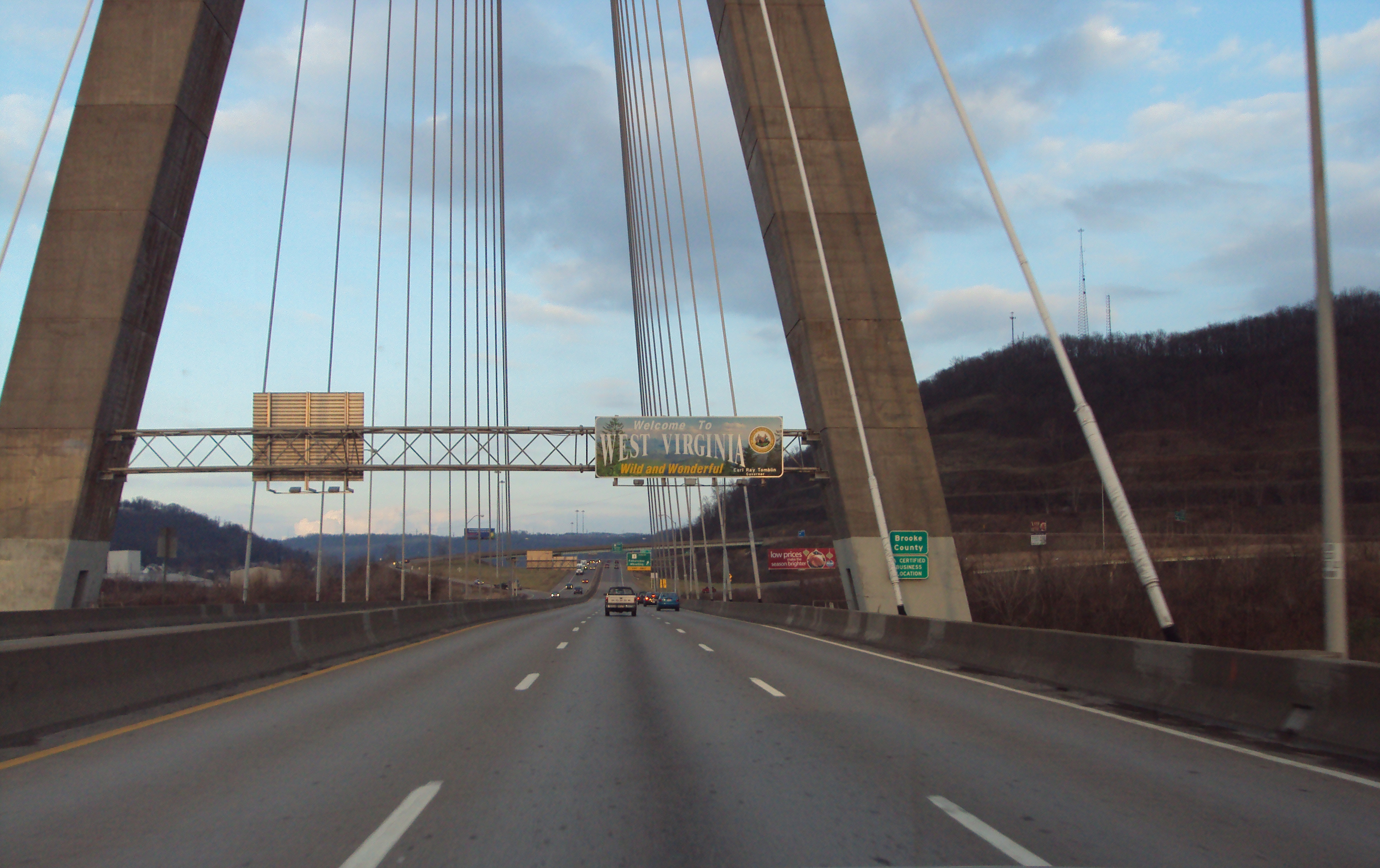
Veterans Memorial Bridge, connecting Weirton, West Virginia to Steubenville, Ohio across the Ohio River, is the border crossing between West Virginia and Ohio on U.S. Route 22.

Planning for the bridge began in 1961 in Ohio and in 1964 in West Virginia. The bridge's construction was approved by the Federal Highway Administration in 1978. Construction began in 1979, and the bridge opened on May 1, 1990. The final cost of the bridge was $70 million.
