= New Manchester, West Virginia =

- Unincorporated community
- Location within West Virginia Location within the United States
- Coordinates: 40°31′53″N 80°34′48″W
- Country: United States
- State: West Virginia
- County: Hancock
- Elevation: 1,188 ft (362 m)
- Time zone: UTC-5 (Eastern (EST))
  - Summer (DST): UTC-4 (EDT)
- ZIP code: 26056
- GNIS feature ID: 1544130

New Manchester is an unincorporated community in Hancock County, West Virginia, United States. It is located along West Virginia Route 8 northeast of New Cumberland near Tomlinson Run State Park.

== History ==
New Manchester was platted in 1810 by David Pugh and named after Manchester, England. It was renamed to Fairview due to its high location when a post office was established in 1818 or 1820. Because of issues with mail being sent to other villages with the same name, the community was renamed Pughtown in 1912 after its founder. The name reverted back to New Manchester in 1967.

Fairview was the county seat of Hancock County from the county's creation in 1848 until 1881. The Old Court House was listed on the National Register of Historic Places in 1973 but has since been demolished.
