= Hancock County, West Virginia =

County in West Virginia, United States

- County
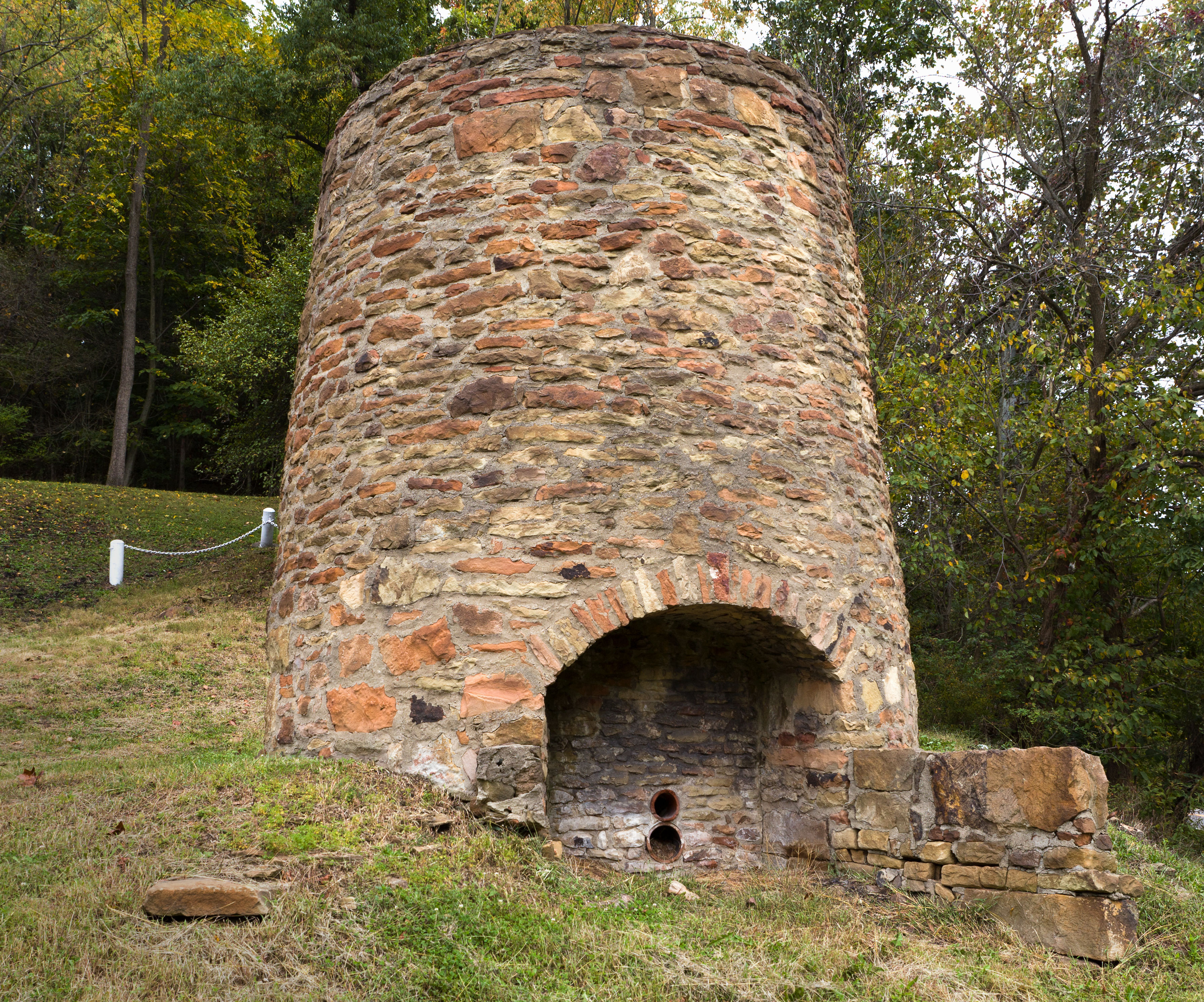
- Peter Tarr Furnace Site

- Seal

- Location within the U.S. state of West Virginia
- Coordinates: 40°31′N 80°35′W
- Country: United States
- State: West Virginia
- Founded: January 15, 1848
- Named for: John Hancock
- Seat: New Cumberland
- Largest city: Weirton

Area
  - Total: 88 sq mi (230 km^{2})
  - Land: 83 sq mi (210 km^{2})
  - Water: 5.4 sq mi (14 km^{2}) 6.1%

Population (2020)
  - Total: 29,095
  - Estimate (2025): 27,729 ▼
  - Density: 350/sq mi (140/km^{2})
- Time zone: UTC−5 (Eastern)
  - Summer (DST): UTC−4 (EDT)
- Congressional district: 1st
- Website: www.hancockcountywv.org

Hancock County is the northernmost county in the U.S. state of West Virginia. As of the 2020 census, the population was 29,095. Its county seat is New Cumberland and its largest city is Weirton. The county was created from Brooke County in 1848 and named for John Hancock, first signer of the Declaration of Independence. Located at the tip of the state's Northern Panhandle, Hancock County is the northernmost point in both West Virginia and, by some definitions, the Southern United States. Hancock County is part of the Weirton-Steubenville, WV-OH Metropolitan Statistical Area, which is also included in the Pittsburgh-New Castle-Weirton, PA-WV-OH Combined Statistical Area.

== History ==
Hancock County was formed from Brooke County in 1848, some 15 years before West Virginia became a state. Both counties were once part of Ohio County, Virginia, which had been formed from the District of West Augusta in 1776. Hancock County has significant Revolutionary-period roots due to its location on the Ohio River south of Fort Pitt in Pittsburgh and north of Fort Henry in Wheeling.

Hancock County was the site of the infamous massacre of Iroquois leader Chief Logan's family in 1774, at Baker's Tavern across the Ohio River from the mouth of Yellow Creek. The event, known as the Yellow Creek massacre, sparked Lord Dunmore's War. Adam Poe had his famous fight with the Indian known as Big Foot at the mouth of Tomlinson Run in 1781. Historical markers commemorate both events. Significant Revolutionary War forts and blockhouses in Hancock County included Holliday's Cove Fort in downtown Weirton and Chapman's Blockhouse in New Cumberland.

In 1863, West Virginia's counties were divided into civil townships, with the intention of encouraging local government. This proved impractical in the heavily rural state, and in 1872 the townships were converted into magisterial districts. Hancock County was divided into four districts: Butler, Clay, Grant, and Poe. Poe, the least populous district, was discontinued in the 1920s.

== Geography ==
According to the United States Census Bureau, the county has a total area of 88 square miles (230 km^{2}), of which 83 square miles (210 km^{2}) is land and 5.4 square miles (14 km^{2}) (6.1%) is water. It is the smallest county in West Virginia by area, as well as one of the smallest in the United States. The highest point of elevation in Hancock County is approximately 1363 ft. and located about 1800 ft. ESE of Emmanuel Mission Church.

=== Major highways ===
- US 22
- US 30
- WV 2
- WV 8
- WV 105

=== Adjacent counties ===
- Columbiana County, Ohio (northwest)
- Beaver County, Pennsylvania (east)
- Washington County, Pennsylvania (southeast)
- Brooke County (south)
- Jefferson County, Ohio (west)

== Demographics ==
Historical population
Census	Pop.	Note	%±
1850	4,050		—
1860	4,445		9.8%
1870	4,363		−1.8%
1880	4,882		11.9%
1890	6,414		31.4%
1900	6,693		4.3%
1910	10,465		56.4%
1920	19,975		90.9%
1930	28,511		42.7%
1940	31,572		10.7%
1950	34,388		8.9%
1960	39,615		15.2%
1970	39,749		0.3%
1980	40,418		1.7%
1990	35,233		−12.8%
2000	32,667		−7.3%
2010	30,676		−6.1%
2020	29,095		−5.2%
2025 (est.)	27,729	▼	−4.7%
U.S. Decennial Census; 1790–1960 1900–1990; 1990–2000 2010–2020

=== 2020 census ===
As of the 2020 census, the county had a population of 29,095. Of the residents, 18.6% were under the age of 18 and 23.7% were 65 years of age or older; the median age was 46.9 years. For every 100 females there were 96.0 males, and for every 100 females age 18 and over there were 94.2 males.

The racial makeup of the county was 91.6% White, 2.4% Black or African American, 0.1% American Indian and Alaska Native, 0.4% Asian, 0.4% from some other race, and 5.0% from two or more races. Hispanic or Latino residents of any race comprised 1.5% of the population.

There were 12,798 households in the county, of which 24.2% had children under the age of 18 living with them and 28.2% had a female householder with no spouse or partner present. About 32.4% of all households were made up of individuals and 15.8% had someone living alone who was 65 years of age or older.

There were 14,241 housing units, of which 10.1% were vacant. Among occupied housing units, 72.1% were owner-occupied and 27.9% were renter-occupied. The homeowner vacancy rate was 1.8% and the rental vacancy rate was 9.6%.

Hancock County, West Virginia – Racial and ethnic composition Note: the US Census treats Hispanic/Latino as an ethnic category. This table excludes Latinos from the racial categories and assigns them to a separate category. Hispanics/Latinos may be of any race.
Race / Ethnicity (NH = Non-Hispanic)	Pop 2000	Pop 2010	Pop 2020	% 2000	% 2010	% 2020
White alone (NH)	31,307	29,143	26,484	95.83%	95.00%	91.02%
Black or African American alone (NH)	747	708	695	2.28%	2.30%	2.38%
Native American or Alaska Native alone (NH)	35	33	31	0.10%	0.10%	0.10%
Asian alone (NH)	111	80	110	0.33%	0.26%	0.37%
Pacific Islander alone (NH)	3	7	8	0.00%	0.02%	0.02%
Other race alone (NH)	17	18	74	0.05%	0.05%	0.25%
Mixed race or Multiracial (NH)	204	373	1,269	0.62%	1.21%	4.36%
Hispanic or Latino (any race)	243	314	424	0.74%	1.02%	1.45%
Total	32,667	30,676	29,095	100.00%	100.00%	100.00%

=== 2010 census ===
As of the 2010 United States census, there were 30,676 people, 13,297 households, and 8,732 families living in the county. The population density was 371.3 inhabitants per square mile (143.4/km^{2}). There were 14,541 housing units at an average density of 176.0 units per square mile (68.0 units/km^{2}). The racial makeup of the county was 95.7% white, 2.3% black or African American, 0.3% Asian, 0.1% American Indian, 0.2% from other races, and 1.3% from two or more races. Those of Hispanic or Latino origin made up 1.0% of the population. In terms of ancestry, 21.1% were German, 18.7% were Irish, 15.6% were Italian, 12.5% were English, 8.0% were Polish, and 6.2% were American.

Of the 13,297 households, 26.6% had children under the age of 18 living with them, 48.9% were married couples living together, 12.2% had a female householder with no husband present, 34.3% were non-families, and 29.5% of all households were made up of individuals. The average household size was 2.29 and the average family size was 2.80. The median age was 45.3 years.

The median income for a household in the county was $38,565 and the median income for a family was $46,978. Males had a median income of $40,961 versus $28,915 for females. The per capita income for the county was $23,118. About 11.2% of families and 14.8% of the population were below the poverty line, including 23.2% of those under age 18 and 7.0% of those age 65 or over.

=== 2000 census ===
As of the census of 2000, there were 32,667 people, 13,678 households, and 9,506 families living in the county. The population density was 394 inhabitants per square mile (152/km^{2}). There were 14,728 housing units at an average density of 178 units per square mile (69 units/km^{2}). The racial makeup of the county was 96.42% White, 2.30% Black or African American, 0.12% Native American, 0.35% Asian, 0.01% Pacific Islander, 0.12% from other races, and 0.69% from two or more races. 0.74% of the population were Hispanic or Latino of any race.

There were 13,678 households, out of which 26.40% had children under the age of 18 living with them, 54.70% were married couples living together, 10.70% had a female householder with no husband present, and 30.50% were non-families. 26.60% of all households were made up of individuals, and 12.50% had someone living alone who was 65 years of age or older. The average household size was 2.36 and the average family size was 2.83.

In the county, the population was spread out, with 20.80% under the age of 18, 7.20% from 18 to 24, 27.10% from 25 to 44, 26.40% from 45 to 64, and 18.40% who were 65 years of age or older. The median age was 42 years. For every 100 females there were 92.40 males. For every 100 females age 18 and over, there were 89.40 males.

The median income for a household in the county was $33,759, and the median income for a family was $40,719. Males had a median income of $34,813 versus $19,100 for females. The per capita income for the county was $17,724. About 9.00% of families and 11.10% of the population were below the poverty line, including 16.10% of those under age 18 and 7.10% of those age 65 or over.

== Government ==
Hancock County is governed by a three-member County Commission who each serve in rotating six-year terms. The terms are designed such that one seat is up for election in even years. The County Commission annually chooses its own president. The Hancock County Commissioners in 2024 are Paul Cowey, Jeff Davis and Eron Chek.

In the West Virginia Circuit Courts, Hancock County is part of the First Family Court Circuit of West Virginia, which also includes Brooke and Ohio Counties. In West Virginia, Family Court Judges were first elected to six-year terms beginning in 2002 and were elected to eight-year terms beginning in 2008. The current judges of the First Family Court Circuit are the Hon. Joyce Chernenko and the Hon. Heather Wood. Additionally, Hancock County is part of the First Judicial Circuit of West Virginia, which again also includes Brooke and Ohio Counties. Circuit Judges are elected in non-partisan elections to eight-year terms. The current judges of the First Judicial Circuit are the Hon. Jason A. Cuomo, the Hon. Michael J. Olejasz, the Hon. David J. Sims, and the Hon. Ronald E. Wilson.

Magistrates are elected in partisan elections serving four-year terms. Vacancies occurring in unexpired terms can be filled by a respective Circuit Court Judge. Unlike Circuit Court judges or Family Court judges, magistrates are not required to be attorneys. Hancock County currently has three magistrates: Ralph A. Fletcher, Omeka D. Petteway, and Stephen Svokas.

Other elected officials are Sheriff Scott Gittings, Circuit Clerk Sandy Casto, County Clerk Karan Valenti, Assessor Joe Alongi and Prosecuting Attorney Steven E. Dragisich.

=== Politics ===
Abutting the free states of Ohio and Pennsylvania, and with a largely German–American culture unlike any other part of antebellum Virginia, Hancock County and the rest of the Northern Panhandle were central to the vanguard who made West Virginia a new state during the Civil War. For the next six and a half decades the county, aided by its association with Pennsylvania's powerful ironmaster-led political machines, voted solidly Republican to the point of supporting William Howard Taft during the disastrously divided 1912 election. From the New Deal until the presidency of Bill Clinton, however, powerful unionization meant that Hancock County turned from solidly Republican to solidly Democratic, with the exception of George McGovern in 1972. Like all of West Virginia, since 2000 a combination of declining unionization and growing differences with the Democratic Party on social issues has produced a swing back to the Republican Party.

United States presidential election results for Hancock County, West Virginia
Year	Republican		Democratic		Third party(ies)	
Year	No.	%	No.	%	No.	%
1912	664	33.54%	634	32.02%	682	34.44%
1916	1,434	58.72%	891	36.49%	117	4.79%
1920	2,768	63.43%	1,435	32.88%	161	3.69%
1924	3,775	71.08%	1,187	22.35%	349	6.57%
1928	5,461	74.06%	1,884	25.55%	29	0.39%
1932	4,328	46.94%	4,603	49.92%	289	3.13%
1936	3,957	33.62%	7,756	65.89%	58	0.49%
1940	4,997	36.98%	8,515	63.02%	0	0.00%
1944	4,285	36.88%	7,334	63.12%	0	0.00%
1948	4,561	35.16%	8,242	63.53%	170	1.31%
1952	6,520	40.02%	9,772	59.98%	0	0.00%
1956	8,750	47.88%	9,524	52.12%	0	0.00%
1960	8,031	41.81%	11,176	58.19%	0	0.00%
1964	5,009	26.35%	14,001	73.65%	0	0.00%
1968	6,181	32.82%	10,174	54.03%	2,476	13.15%
1972	10,634	61.25%	6,727	38.75%	0	0.00%
1976	6,771	38.92%	10,627	61.08%	0	0.00%
1980	6,610	40.12%	8,784	53.32%	1,081	6.56%
1984	7,326	45.44%	8,708	54.01%	90	0.56%
1988	5,882	41.19%	8,338	58.39%	60	0.42%
1992	3,897	25.92%	7,830	52.08%	3,309	22.01%
1996	4,268	30.44%	7,521	53.64%	2,231	15.91%
2000	6,458	47.94%	6,249	46.39%	765	5.68%
2004	7,298	50.96%	6,906	48.22%	117	0.82%
2008	7,518	56.87%	5,504	41.63%	198	1.50%
2012	7,226	59.47%	4,627	38.08%	297	2.44%
2016	8,909	69.59%	3,262	25.48%	631	4.93%
2020	9,806	71.05%	3,790	27.46%	206	1.49%
2024	9,462	72.62%	3,360	25.79%	208	1.60%

== Communities ==
=== Cities ===
- Chester
- New Cumberland (county seat)
- Weirton (part)

=== Magisterial districts ===
- Butler
- Clay
- Grant

=== Census-designated place ===
- Newell

=== Unincorporated communities ===
- Congo
- Fairhaven
- Kings Creek
- Lawrenceville
- Lennyville
- Moscow
- New Manchester
- Sun Valley
- Vermont Terrace

=== Population ranking ===
The population ranking of the following table is based on the 2020 census of Hancock County.

† county seat

Rank	City/Town/etc.	Population (2020 Census)	Population (2021 Estimate)	Municipal type
1	Weirton partially in Brooke County	19,163	18,813	City
2	Chester	2,208	2,173	City
3	Newell	1,203	--	CDP
4	† New Cumberland	1,020	1,007	City

== See also ==
- Hancock County Schools
- Hillcrest Wildlife Management Area
- National Register of Historic Places listings in Hancock County, West Virginia
- Ohio River Trail
- Tomlinson Run State Park
