= National Register of Historic Places listings in Hancock County, West Virginia =

Location of Hancock County in West Virginia

This is a list of the National Register of Historic Places listings in Hancock County, West Virginia.

This is intended to be a complete list of the properties and districts on the National Register of Historic Places in Hancock County, West Virginia, United States. The locations of National Register properties and districts for which the latitude and longitude coordinates are included below, may be seen in an online map.

There are 11 properties listed on the National Register in the county.

This National Park Service list is complete through NPS recent listings posted March 21, 2025.

Contents: Counties in West Virginia

Barbour - Berkeley - Boone - Braxton - Brooke - Cabell - Calhoun - Clay - Doddridge - Fayette - Gilmer - Grant - Greenbrier - Hampshire - Hancock - Hardy - Harrison - Jackson - Jefferson - Kanawha - Lewis - Lincoln - Logan - Marion - Marshall - Mason - McDowell - Mercer - Mineral - Mingo - Monongalia - Monroe - Morgan - Nicholas - Ohio - Pendleton - Pleasants - Pocahontas - Preston - Putnam - Raleigh - Randolph - Ritchie - Roane - Summers - Taylor - Tucker - Tyler - Upshur - Wayne - Webster - Wetzel - Wirt - Wood - Wyoming

== Current listings ==
	Name on the Register	Image	Date listed	Location	City or town	Description
1	Dunbar Recreation Center	Dunbar Recreation Center	July 22, 2021 (#100006740)	300 Kessell St. 40°24′45″N 80°35′04″W	Weirton	
2	First National Bank-Graham Building	First National Bank-Graham Building	November 2, 2000 (#00001312)	100 N. Chester St. 40°29′54″N 80°36′35″W	New Cumberland	
3	Johnston-Truax House	Johnston-Truax House	September 23, 1993 (#93000611)	209 Seneca St. 40°25′34″N 80°33′27″W	Weirton	
4	Marland Heights Park and Margaret Manson Weir Memorial Pool	Marland Heights Park and Margaret Manson Weir Memorial Pool	November 15, 1993 (#93001230)	Junction of Williams Dr. and Riverview Dr. 40°24′14″N 80°35′59″W	Weirton	
5	Marshall House	Marshall House	March 12, 2001 (#01000263)	1008 Ridge Ave. 40°29′47″N 80°36′16″W	New Cumberland	
6	James F. Murray House	James F. Murray House	July 12, 1990 (#90001066)	530 Louisiana Ave. 40°36′42″N 80°33′42″W	Chester	Destroyed
7	People's Bank	People's Bank	March 17, 1995 (#95000253)	3383 Main St. 40°24′05″N 80°35′03″W	Weirton	
8	Dr. George Rigas House	Dr. George Rigas House	April 21, 2004 (#04000358)	3412 West St. 40°24′14″N 80°35′26″W	Weirton	
8	Peter Tarr Furnace Site	Peter Tarr Furnace Site	January 1, 1976 (#76001935)	Kings Creek Rd., north of Weirton; 40°26′15″N 80°34′22″W	Weirton	
9	Waterford Park	Waterford Park	December 12, 2002 (#02001528)	WV 2; 40°34′49″N 80°39′42″W	Newell	
10	William E. Wells House	William E. Wells House	April 23, 2009 (#09000244)	372 Virginia Terr. 40°36′53″N 80°36′04″W	Newell	11 John Village House 3185 Wylie Ridge Road, Weirton, WV. Built in 1774

== Former listing ==
	Name on the Register	Image	Date listed	Date removed	Location	City or town	Description
1	Old Courthouse		July 2, 1973 (#73001902)	June 4, 1986	High and Elm Streets; 40°31′50″N 80°34′35″W	New Manchester	Demolished

== See also ==
- List of National Historic Landmarks in West Virginia
- National Register of Historic Places listings in West Virginia
