= Harmon Creek (Ohio River tributary) =

Tributary of the Ohio River

Harmon Creek Tributary to Ohio River
- Location of Harmon Creek mouth Harmon Creek (Ohio River tributary) (the United States)

Location
- Country: United States
- States: West Virginia; Pennsylvania
- Counties: Brooke (WV); Hancock (WV); Washington (PA)
- Cities: Weirton; Colliers

Physical characteristics
- Source: unnamed tributary to Kings Creek divide
  - location: about 0.25 miles south of Florence, Pennsylvania
  - coordinates: 40°25′51″N 080°26′01″W
  - elevation: 1,180 ft (360 m)
- Mouth: Ohio River
  - location: Weirton, West Virginia
  - coordinates: 40°22′40″N 080°36′26″W
  - elevation: 644 ft (196 m)
- Length: 15.75 mi (25.35 km)
- Basin size: 38.34 square miles (99.3 km^{2})
- Discharge
  - location: Ohio River
  - average: 42.34 cu ft/s (1.199 m^{3}/s) at mouth with Ohio River

Basin features
- Progression: Ohio River → Mississippi River → Gulf of Mexico
- River system: Ohio River
- Tributaries
  - left: Mechling Run; Sappingtons Run
  - right: Ward Run; Paris Run; Alexanders Run
- Waterbodies: Star Lake
- Bridges: Star Lake Lane, Goodwill Hill Road, Francis Mine State Road (x2), Hanlin Station Road, Harmon Creek Road, Ohio Street, Cope Will Street, 8th Street, Pittsburgh Street, 7th Street, Centre Street, 6th Street, Sappington Street, 5th Street, 4th Street, 3rd Street, Ohio Street, Colliers Way, WV 1 (x2), Three Arches Road, WV 1, US 22, Walnut Street, WV 2, Military Drive, US 22

Harmon Creek is a 15.75 mi (25.35 km) long 3rd order tributary to the Ohio River in Brooke County, West Virginia.

== Variant names ==
According to the Geographic Names Information System, it has also been known historically as:

- Hard Bargain Creek
- Harman's Creek
- Harmons Creek
- Horman's Creek
- Hormans Creek

== Course ==
Harmon Creek rises about 0.2 miles (0.32 km) south of Florence, Pennsylvania, in Washington County and then flows south and west into West Virginia and Brooke County and briefly turns north into Hancock County to join the Ohio River at the south end of Weirton.

== Watershed ==
Harmon Creek drains 42.34 square miles (109.7 km^{2}) of area, receives about 40.2 inches per year (102 cm/year) of precipitation, has a wetness index of 326.37, and is about 70% forested.

== See also ==
- List of rivers of Pennsylvania
- List of rivers of West Virginia
