= Sappingtons Run =

Stream in West Virginia, USA

Sappingtons Run Tributary to Harmon Creek
- Location of Sappingtons Run mouth Sappingtons Run (the United States)

Location
- Country: United States
- State: West Virginia
- County: Brooke

Physical characteristics
- Source: unnamed tributary to Harmon Creek divide
  - location: about 2 miles west of Colliers, West Virginia
  - coordinates: 40°22′09″N 080°34′21″W
  - elevation: 1.140 ft (0.347 m)
- Mouth: Harmon Creek
  - location: Weirton, West Virginia
  - coordinates: 40°23′23″N 080°34′07″W
  - elevation: 725 ft (221 m)
- Length: 2.31 mi (3.72 km)
- Basin size: 2.08 square miles (5.4 km^{2})
- Discharge
  - location: Harmons Creek
  - average: 2.40 cu ft/s (0.068 m^{3}/s) at mouth with Harmon Creek

Basin features
- Progression: Harmon Creek → Ohio River → Mississippi River → Gulf of Mexico
- River system: Ohio River
- Tributaries
  - left: unnamed tributaties
  - right: unnamed tributaries
- Bridges: Morton Hill Road, WV 1, Three Arches Road

Sappingtons Run is a 2.31 mi (3.72 km) long 1st order tributary to Harmon Creek in Brooke County, West Virginia. This is the only stream of this name in the United States.

== Course ==
Sappingtons Run rises about 2 miles west of Colliers, West Virginia, and then flows north and northeast to join Harmon Creek at Weirton.

== Watershed ==
Sappingtons Run drains 2.08 square miles (5.4 km^{2}) of area, receives about 40.1 in/year of precipitation, has a wetness index of 300.63, and is about 76% forested.

== See also ==
- List of rivers of West Virginia
