= Alexanders Run =

Stream in West Virginia, USA

Alexanders Run Tributary to Harmon Creek
- Location of Alexanders Run mouth Alexanders Run (the United States)

Location
- Country: United States
- State: West Virginia
- County: Brooke; Hancock
- City: Weirton Heights

Physical characteristics
- Source: unnamed tributary to Kings Creek divide
  - location: Weirton Heights, West Virginia
  - coordinates: 40°24′30″N 080°33′11″W
  - elevation: 1.090 ft (0.332 m)
- Mouth: Harmon Creek
  - location: about 1 mile northwest of Colliers, West Virginia
  - coordinates: 40°22′30″N 080°31′34″W
  - elevation: 774 ft (236 m)
- Length: 3.69 mi (5.94 km)
- Basin size: 2.95 square miles (7.6 km^{2})
- Discharge
  - location: Harmons Creek
  - average: 3.42 cu ft/s (0.097 m^{3}/s) at mouth with Harmon Creek

Basin features
- Progression: Harmon Creek → Ohio River → Mississippi River → Gulf of Mexico
- River system: Ohio River
- Tributaries
  - left: unnamed tributaties
  - right: unnamed tributaries
- Bridges: Colliers Steel Road (x3)

Alexanders Run is a 3.69 mi (5.94 km) long 1st order tributary to Harmon Creek in Brooke County, West Virginia. This is the only stream of this name in the United States.

== Course ==
Alexanders Run rises at Weirton Heights, West Virginia, and then flows south-southwest to join Harmon Creek about 1 mile northwest of Colliers.

== Watershed ==
Alexanders Run drains 2.95 square miles (7.6 km^{2}) of area, receives about 40.0 in/year of precipitation, has a wetness index of 339.87, and is about 59% forested.

== See also ==
- List of rivers of West Virginia
