= Uriah Brown =

US Army soldier (1841–1927)

Uriah H. Brown
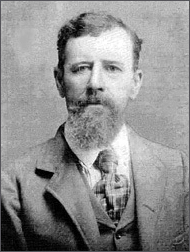
- Uriah H. Brown, c. 1905
- Born: July 4, 1841; Covington, Ohio
- Died: January 24, 1927 (aged 85); Hollidays Cove, West Virginia
- Burial place: Paris Cemetery, Washington County, Pennsylvania
- Military career
- Allegiance: United States of America
- Branch: Union Army
- Service years: 1861–1865
- Rank: Private
- Unit: 30th Regiment Ohio Volunteer Infantry - Company G
- Conflicts: American Civil War: Battle of Antietam; Siege of Vicksburg; Battle of Vicksburg; Siege of Jackson; Atlanta campaign; Campaign of the Carolinas
- Awards: Medal of Honor

Uriah H. Brown (1841–1927) was a United States soldier who fought with the Union Army during the American Civil War as a member of Company G, 30th Ohio Infantry. He received the Medal of Honor, his country's highest award for bravery during combat, for his actions during the Battle of Vicksburg in Mississippi on 22 May 1863. That award was conferred on August 15, 1894.

== Formative years ==
Born in Covington, Ohio, on July 4, 1841, Uriah H. Brown was a son of Ohio native William Brown."

Religiously, he was a member of the Protestant denomination known as the Disciples of Christ, and was documented as having been, in later years, a member of the congregation of what is, today, the First Christian Church of Weirton, West Virginia. According to U.S. Senator Jay Rockefeller:

Members of the [First Christian Church, Weirton] have been faithful in serving their country. One of the church’s original members, in fact, received a Congressional Medal of Honor in 1898. Mr. Uriah Brown received the award for his heroism in the Civil War, especially at the siege of Vicksburg.

== Civil War ==
Brown enrolled for Civil War military service at Steubenville, Ohio, in August 1861, and then officially mustered in for duty that same month at Camp Chase as a private with Company G of the 30th Ohio Infantry.

Armed and equipped over the next two days, Pvt. Brown and his fellow 30th Ohio Infantrymen were then ordered into the field. Departing from Columbus aboard passenger cars via the Baltimore and Ohio Railroad, they arrived in Benwood, Virginia, where they transferred to a freight train for further transport to Clarksburg. Arriving on September 2, they immediately began preparations to join the Union Army troops which were under the command of Brigadier-General William Rosecrans. Marching for Weston during the evening, they were ordered to make camp around midnight. The next morning, they resumed their march and, upon reaching Weston, made camp near the 47th Ohio Infantry. Marching again on September 5, they connected with Rosecrans' army near Sutton.

Although part of the 30th Ohio was ordered onward to Little Birch Mountain and Summersville to guard the wagon train accompanying Rosecrans' forces, Pvt. Brown and his fellow members of G Company were directed to remain behind with the men from Companies D, F and I. Consequently, when part of the 30th Ohio engaged in fighting with Confederate troops at Carnifex Ferry on September 10, the men of G Company (including Brown) were not involved. Having remained behind near Sutton, the men from Companies D, F, G, and I were sent out periodically on a series of scouting and skirmish parties. During one of these forays, men from Companies G and I encountered and engaged with Confederate troops near Crites Mountain on November 13 and 14. Having successfully pushed Confederate troops out of what is, today, West Virginia, Rosecrans ordered his army into winter quarters in late November 1861. Various men were then sent out as part of detachments to track down bushwhackers, assist families loyal to the Union, and serve on picket duties throughout the month of December. Following their participation in a dress parade on Christmas Day, 30th Ohioans then celebrated the holiday with food and entertainment.

=== 1862 to early 1863 ===
Assigned to occupation duties at Fayetteville during the winter and early spring of 1862, the 30th Ohio marched in April for Raleigh and then Princeton, where they remained until early May. Heading for Giles Court House May 10, they ultimately made camp near the East River. While there, food supplies began to run short, and men were rationed to one piece of hardtack per day with supplements of rice and beans until those supplies also ran out. Ordered to march back to Princeton the next day, many men left their warmer clothing, blankets and tents behind in order to lighten their loads – a mistake they would soon come to regret. Marching for Raleigh early the next morning, they were ordered to make camp at the top of the Great Flat Top Mountain on May 19. While there, they battled the cold and rain until they were able to erect sturdy shelters. After finally being re-equipped with tents and other supplies, they were then ordered to move to a site near Camp Bark, where they established a more comfortable headquarters, complete with a bakery and shower. Remaining at "Camp Jones" through mid-August, Pvt. Brown and his fellow 30th Ohioans drilled regularly with bayonets.

Marching August 19 for Brownstown, 95 miles away, the regiment made, broke and re-made camp at several points along the way, including at McCoys and just outside of Fayetteville and Cannelton. Boarding a steamer at Brownstown, they next found themselves at Blannerhasset Island in Ohio before being permitted to enter Parkersburg for rest and refreshment.

Ordered back to eastern Virginia before month's end, the regiment departed once again by rail. Passing through Washington, D.C. and Alexandria, Virginia on August 23, the 30th Ohioans encamped in Warrenton, were assigned to picket duty at Catlett's Station and Bristoe Station, and helped to repel the enemy near Centerville and Fairfax Court House before joining the Union Army's Kanawha Division in early September. Commanded by General Marcus Reno, the Kanawha was part of the massive Union force led by General Ambrose Burnside. Marching for Georgetown in the District of Columbia on September 6, the 30th Ohio was positioned to defend Washington, D.C. from advancing Confederate forces before marching on toward New Market and Frederick City, where they were moved into the line of battle, and helped to drive off the enemy in order to retake the city.

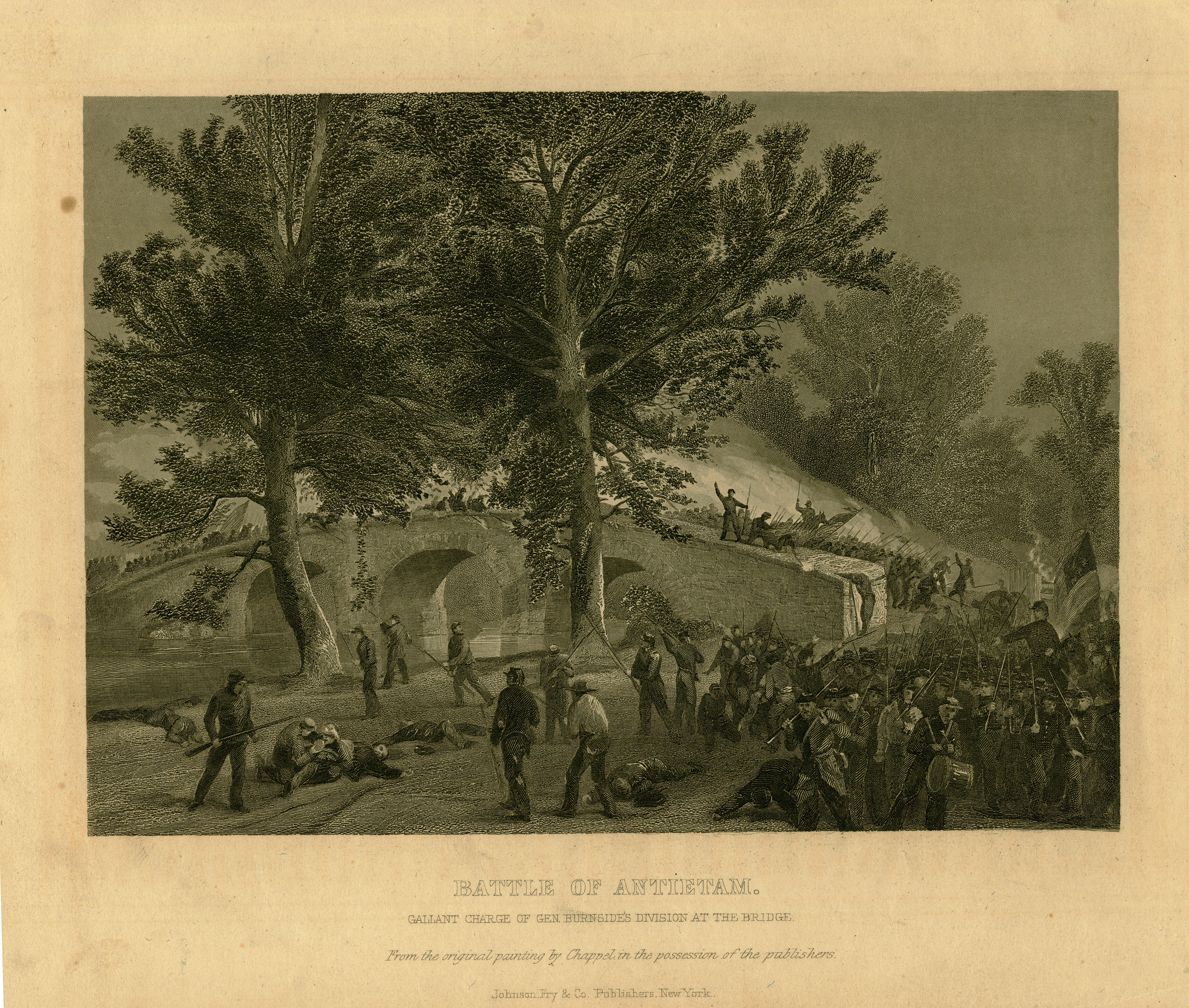
Battle of Antietam, September 17, 1862 (Missouri History Museum, c. 1861–1865).

Battered by artillery at Lamb's Field and Farmer's Gap on its advance toward the Antietam as part of the Kanawha Division during the early weeks of September, the regiment lost several of its men as it engaged with the enemy. During the morning of September 17, the 30th Ohioans were among those placed near the head of the advance as the Union Army engaged in the Battle of Antietam. According to Brinkerhoff, "the balls flew like hail through the corn and many a brave soldier fell," including the regiment's two color-bearers, who had become the rallying point for the 30th Ohio during the confusing carnage on the smoke-obscured battlefield that day. "The National Color was torn in fourteen places by enemy's balls, and the Regimental color, though not so often struck, still [bore] the marks of this bloody field" in 1863 when Brinkerhoff set pen to paper to chronicle the regiment's early days. "Shortly after retiring before the superior force of Hill's Division, a heavy column of [the 30th Ohio] marched down from the right and drove the enemy back to the road. On the morning of the eighteenth, "our entire line, from right to left, occupied the ground held by the enemy on the preceding morning, and held possession of his strongest position." At noon the regiment was ordered back to the site where it had camped two days earlier. On September 19, they gathered and buried their dead. The men of the 30th Ohio were among those reviewed by President Abraham Lincoln and General George B. McClellan several weeks later. During the opening weeks of October, they continued to pursue the enemy, moving back and for across Virginia as they did so. Following a reorganization of their Division (the Kanawha) in early November, the 30th Ohio was ordered into winter quarters, and made camp near Cannelton mid-month. Ordered to march for Brownstown November 30, the regiment reached there the next day, and re-encamped near Len's Creek.

Throughout early December, the regiment moved repeatedly, crossing and re-crossing creeks, flat ground and higher mountains en route to the Logan Court House during the daytime, and bedding down for the night in deserted homes which dotted the countryside, all the while searching for Confederate troops. After capturing 19 of the enemy and 75 horses, the 30th Ohioans turned over the enemy men to Union authorities at Brownstown. Briefly re-encamped from December 9–13, the regiment moved on in pursuit of the enemy. Boarding the flagship of the Union troops commanded by General Charles Ewing, the regiment sailed from Brownstown, and disembarked on January 3, 1863, at Louisville, Kentucky, where it made came near the Louisville and Nashville Railroad. Boarding the Silver Moon on January 9, Pvt. Brown and his fellow 30th Ohioans sailed again — this time, headed southwest — down the Ohio River and toward Vicksburg, Mississippi. Following their transfer at Memphis, Tennessee to the Prima Donna and further sailing, they disembarked at Helena, where they were attached to General David Steward's Division in Major-General William Tecumseh Sherman's 15th U.S. Army.

Moved to Young's Point, Louisiana, the 30th Ohioans continued on toward Vicksburg, positioning themselves at the mouth of the canal just outside of the city. While here, they helped strengthen Union fortifications and improve the canal to facilitate the movement of Union troops and supplies. Moved to a site above Vicksburg sometime in late February, they encamped there until receiving orders to sail again. Disembarking at Eagle Bend, part of the regiment discovered plans for Confederate troop movements and other important documents at the abandoned mansion of U.S. Senator William M. Gwin on March 17 while the remainder of the regiment continued on until disembarking at Hill's plantation on March 21. Fully reconstituted the next day, the regiment moved on, leaving small detachments of its men at three different villas — "Reality", "Good Intent", and Kelsey's, where they discovered a large number of cotton bales marked "C.S.A". Ordered back to Louisiana later that month, the 30th Ohioans sailed aboard the gunboats Cincinnati and Mound City, disembarking again at Young's Point on March 28. Ordered to assemble with other Union troops at "General Blair's headquarters", they were present for the April 21 address by Brigadier-General Lorenzo Thomas, Adjutant General of the U.S. Army, during which he announced President Lincoln's intention "to arm the negroes and to officer them from the army."

On April 29, the regiment boarded the steamer R.B. Hamilton, and sailed for the mouth of the Yazoo River, where it connected with other Union troops on the gunboats Choctaw and Tyler, the ironclad Byron de Kalb, four "musquito" boats, and the USS Black Hawk. General Sherman then boarded the Hamilton with the 30th Ohio as the expedition set off, and announced that the combined force would "make a demonstration upon Hain's Bluff to attract the attention of the enemy while General Grant effected a landing upon the Mississippi shore at Grand Gulf." Shelling points along the way, the troops disembarked near Drumgold's Hill, and moved out with the 30th Ohio in the lead and two of its right-wing companies deployed as skirmishers. Battered by enemy artillery en route, the regiment sheltered behind a levee near Drumgold's, and then bedded down after nightfall. During the ensuing standoff over the next few days, both sides deployed skirmishers and exchanged artillery fire, ultimately compelling the Confederate troops to abandon their heavily fortified positions. Returned by gunboat to Young's Point, the 30th Ohioans were then redirected to Milliken's Bend, where they encamped briefly before being ordered to move, on May 5, toward Richmond and New Carthage.

On May 9, Pvt. Brown and his fellow G Company soldiers joined those from Companies E, F and K in guarding the Union's commissary at Richmond. They then rejoined their regiment at Milliken's Bend the next day after the commissary's stores were moved to a safer location. During this phase of duty, they saw frequent examples of the suffering endured by local residents, a number of whom approached Union troops for food or other forms of assistance. Ordered onward again on May 13, they boarded the steamer Golden Era. Disembarking again at Young's Point, Louisiana, they marched along a new road which had been built across the Cypress Swamps until reaching a plantation just outside of Warrenton, where they were ordered to take shelter during a heavy rain by bedding down in the cabins of former slaves. Boarding the Silver Wave the next day, they reached Grand Gulf, where they disembarked and began a march toward Jackson. Five miles later, they made camp. The next morning (May 16), they continued on, marching an additional 23 miles before re-encamping again. While here, they learned that Jackson had been captured by Union forces two days earlier. Resuming their march the next day, they moved north toward the railroad, marching for an additional 25 miles before re-encamping yet again. On May 18, they marched an additional 35 miles, making camp within a quarter mile of Vicksburg. On May 19, they joined with other Union troops in assaulting Fort Beauregard during the Siege of Vicksburg. According to Brinkerhoff:

Every one expected another complete victory. General Ewing encouraged his Brigade with the remark that "it would be a short job, and that we would be inside of the works, in less than ten minutes after receiving the order to move." We were to charge in line of battle at two o'clock. The Thirtieth was retained as a reserve, and the 4th Virginia, the 37th and 47th Ohio, ordered to charge.... The enemy opened a terrible fire upon them, of musketry, grape, cannister, and shell, and death ruled the hour.... Still the survivors pressed forward, until they actually reached the enemy's works. Here they found a deep ditch and a steep, high, outer slope, inside the moat. No preparations had been made to cross this ditch or scale the works. The enemy ... opened his musketry and artillery with redoubled fury; and our men ... retired to the first cover, laid down, and awaited orders from the Brigade commander.

Repulsed, the Kanawha Brigade retreated, regrouped, and resumed their role as part of the Union's siege efforts. Ordered to move again during the afternoon of May 22, the 30th Ohioans positioned themselves "on the top of the west slope of our hollow, within four hundred yards of the enemy, and opened a rapid fire upon him", according to Brinkerhoff. They had just fired their opening shots in the Battle of Vicksburg.

=== Battle of Vicksburg (May 22, 1863) ===
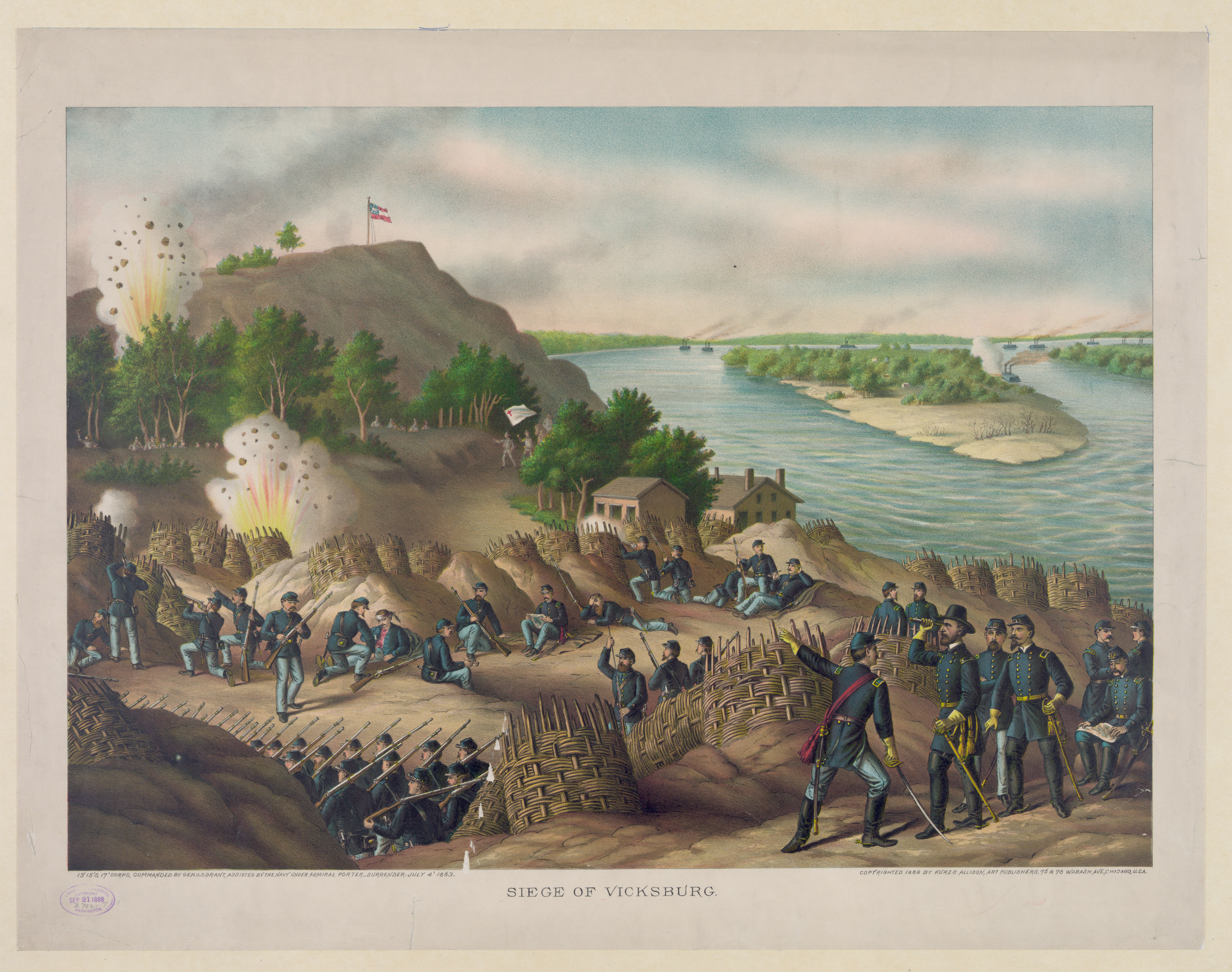
Battle of Vicksburg, Virginia, May 22, 1863 (U.S. Library of Congress).

While stationed in Mississippi with his regiment during the third year of the American Civil War, Brown was pressed into service as "a member of what is known as the 'volunteer storming party' or 'forlorn hope' on May 22, 1863, at Vicksburg," according to a sketch of his life which was presented in the Observer-Reporter of Washington, Pennsylvania in 2013. Attacking Vicksburg a second time in response to orders from General Ulysses S. Grant, Brown and a significant number of his comrades from the 30th Ohio and other Union regiments were wounded while attempting to place ladders against an embankment and the side of Fort Beauregard. Despite the risk to his own life, he rescued five men while under heavy fire, according to his Medal of Honor citation. Many others were killed instantly during the assault, including the captain of Brown's company. According to historians W. F. Beyer and O. F. Keydel:

[Brown's] captain was shot dead at his side and his lieutenant dangerously wounded, but he kept on till he reached the ditch. He threw his log [a segment of wood that was to be used in building the ladders troops would use to scale the fort] across, but found it too short to reach the other side. While considering what he could do he was shot down and tumbled into the ditch. When he came to his senses and found the enemy dropping shells into the ditch among the wounded men, he set to work to drag them into sheltered positions. He had got three of the wounded into a safe place, when one of the officers forbade him to expose himself any longer. He lay quiet for a time, but the longing to get back over came him and he climbed out of the ditch and crawled for fifty yards exposed to the terrible fire, till he found a place of safety behind a little knoll. Two wounded men were lying near by, moaning in pain, and he crept out and dragged them under cover, gave them water and lay down beside them till nightfall, when he assisted them back to their own lines.

Afterward, assaults continued on the fort and on the city itself as the Siege of Vicksburg wore on. On the Fourth of July, 1863, the city finally fell when Lt. General John C. Pemberton and his Confederate troops surrendered to Union Army leaders. After recovering from his battle-related wound, Brown returned to duty with his regiment. As the war ground on, he and his fellow 30th Ohioans continued their march as part of the 3rd Brigade, 2nd Division, 15th Army Corps. Advancing on Jackson, Mississippi from July 5–10, 1864, they participated in the Siege of Jackson from July 10–17, moved on to Big Black, where they encamped until September 26, and then to Memphis, Tennessee before marching to Chattanooga, where they remained until November 20. Engaged in the Chattanooga-Ringgold Campaign from November 23–27 and in operations at Tunnel Hill and Mission Ridge from November 24–25, they also participated in the relief of Knoxville from November 27 through December 8. Marching for Bridgeport, Alabama, they remained there until December 19, and then moved on to Bellefonte Station December 26.

=== 1864 to 1865 ===
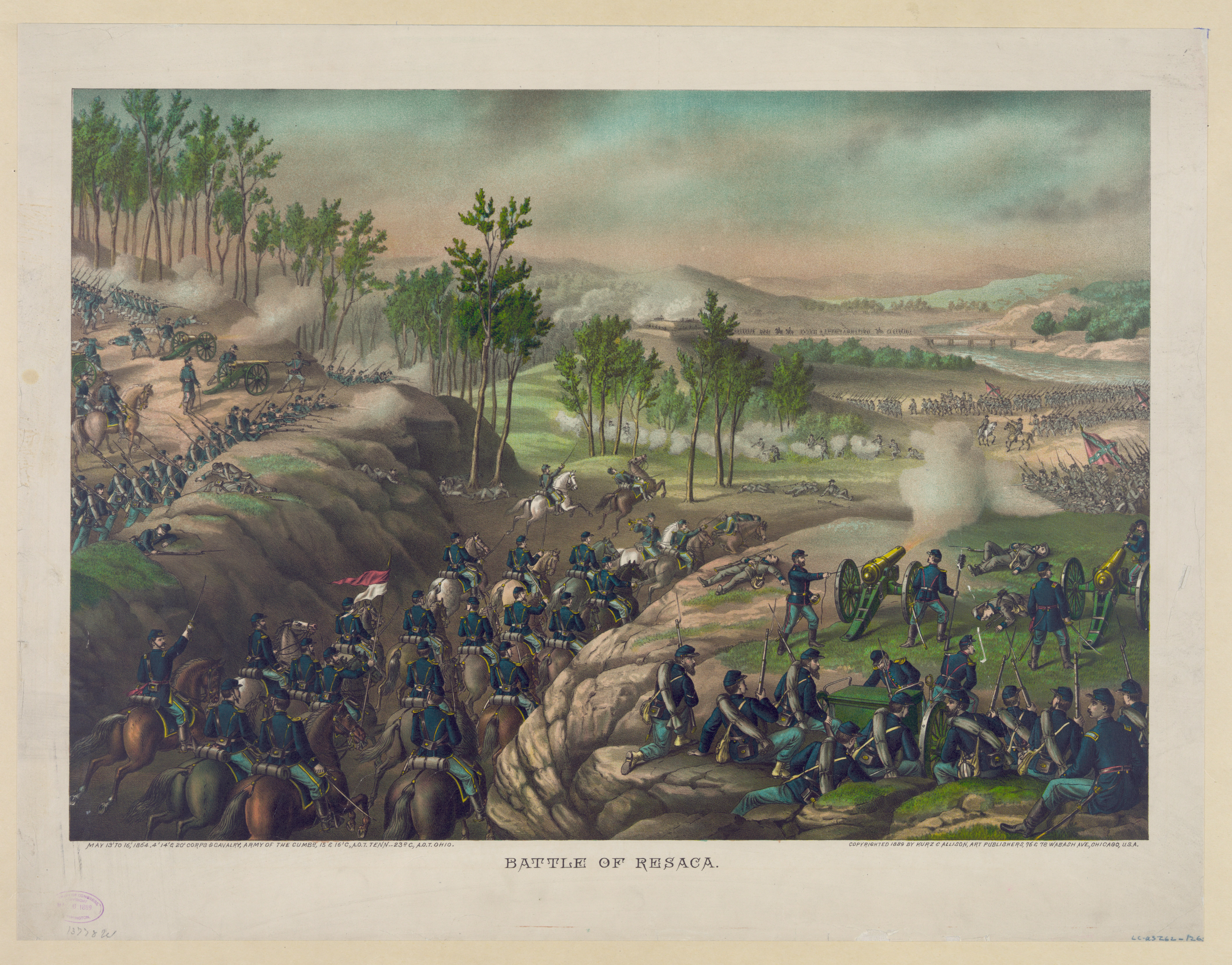
Battle of Resaca, May 14–15, 1864 (U.S. Library of Congress).

From Bellefonte Station, the 30th Ohio moved to Larkin's Ferry on January 26, 1864, and then to Cleveland, Tennessee. Around this time, a number of 30th Ohioans re-enrolled for additional tours of duty, and were rewarded with veterans' furloughs, which they took during April and May of that year. Assigned with other Union troops to the Atlanta Campaign from May 1 through September 8, the 30th Ohioans were involved, from May 8–13, with operations at Resaca, and participated in the Battle of Resaca from May 14–15. Advancing on Dallas from May 18–25, they then engaged in operations at Pumpkin Vine Creek, Dallas, New Hope Church, and Allatoona Hills through June 5 and in operations at Marietta and Kennesaw Mountain from June 10 through July 2, as well as at Nickajack Creek (July 2–5), Ruff's Mills (July 3–4), and the Chattahoochie River (July 5–17). Fighting in the Battle of Atlanta on July 22, they then were engaged in combat actions at Ezra Chapel during the Siege of Atlanta, an entrenchment which lasted until August 25. Participating in the flanking of Jonesboro from August 25–30 and the Battle of Jonesborough from August 31 through September 1, they were also involved in Union operations at Lovejoy Station (September 2–6).

When Brown's initial three-year term of service expired during this phase of service, he then also re-enlisted with the 30th Ohio Infantry (in September 1864).

Assigned to operations against John Bell Hood's Confederate forces in North Georgia and North Alabama from September 29 through November 3, Pvt. Brown and his fellow 30th Ohioans participated in Sherman's March to the Sea from November 15 through December 10 and the Siege of Savannah from December 10–21. As the war rolled on into its final year, they became part of the Union's Campaign of the Carolinas from January through April 1865. Stationed at Duck Branch near Loper's Cross Roads, South Carolina on February 2, 1865, they moved to the South Edisto River (February 9), the North Edisto River (February 11–13), and Columbia (February 16–17). Engaged in the Battle of Bentonville, North Carolina from March 20–21, they were then assigned to occupation duties in Goldsboro, beginning March 24. Ordered to advance with other Union troops on Raleigh from April 10–14, they were then assigned to occupation duties there beginning April 14, followed by operations at Bennett's House on April 26. After witnessing the surrender of Johnston's army, they marched for Richmond and then Washington, D.C., where they participated in the Union's Grand Review of the Armies on May 24, 1865. Stationed at Louisville, Kentucky on June 2, they then moved on to Little Rock, Arkansas, where they remained from June 25 through August 13, 1865, when the regiment was officially mustered out.

Pvt. Brown's service, however, lasted slightly longer. According to the special census of Union Civil War veterans, which was conducted in 1890, he was honorably discharged on September 14, 1865.

== Post-war life ==
Following his honorable discharge from the military, Brown resumed his life as a civilian. Employed as carpenter in West Virginia during the mid-1860s and married to Illinois native America/Americus (Loland) Brown, he welcomed the birth of their son, Lee, sometime around 1865, and their daughter, Mary Jane, in Hancock County, West Virginia, on June 11, 1868.

In 1870, Brown was a farmer living in Gilmore Township, Jackson County, Virginia with his wife and two children, Lee and Mary Jane. Their daughter, Alice Ellen, was then born in the Kings Creek District of Hancock County on September 29, 1882, followed by daughter, Rebecca, who was born in Pleasants County, West Virginia, on December 4, 1886.

Sometime around 1884, Brown remarried, taking as his bride, Sarah Elizabeth Greer, a native of Washington County, Pennsylvania.

By 1890, he was documented as a resident of the community of Florence in Hanover Township, Washington County. The special census of Civil War veterans and widows, which was conducted by the federal government that year, documented his initial 1861 enrollment with the 30th Ohio, as well as his subsequent re-enlistment with that regiment in 1864, and noted that he had been "twice wounded". On August 15, 1894, his Civil War heroism was finally acknowledged by the federal government when he was awarded the U.S. Medal of Honor.

== Illness, death and interment ==
Shortly after the turn of the century, a federal census taker documented that Brown was still a farmer and still residing with his second wife, Sarah, in Hanover Township, Washington County, Pennsylvania, and also noted that Brown's daughter, Alice, was also living with him. Shown on that year's census as "Ella A. Brown", she was described as having been born in West Virginia in September 1882. That year's census taker also noted that Brown had been married to his second wife, Sarah, for only 16 years (wed circa 1884), and that she had never given birth to any children during their marriage, thereby confirming that Brown had, in fact, been married twice.

In 1906, Brown was awarded a U.S. Civil War Pension of $12 per month; that rate was then raised to $25 per month when his pension was reissued in 1913. In subsequent years, his pension rate continued to rise steadily in recognition of the increasing level of disability he was experiencing as a direct result of the wounds he sustained in combat during the Civil War. By 1927, he was collecting a pension of $100 per month, which included "a special pension of $10 per month under Act of April 27, 1916, providing for Medal of Honor Roll", according to his United States Veterans Administration Pension Payment Card. Still residing with his second wife, and Ella Brown (his daughter from his first marriage) in Hanover Township in 1910, Brown continued to farm the land.

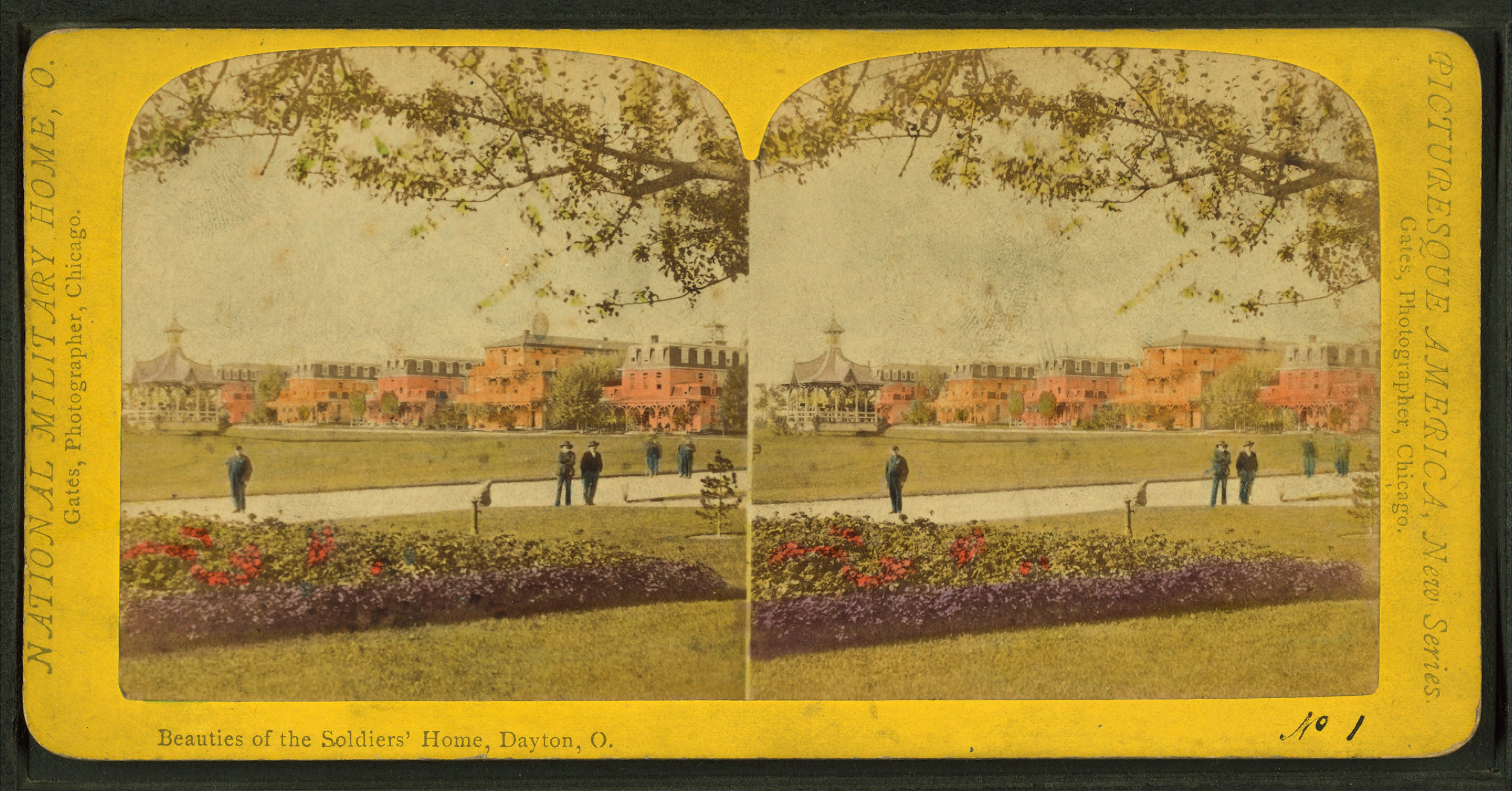
U.S. National Home for Disabled Volunteer Soldiers, Dayton, Ohio (G. F. Gates, c. early 1900s).

On February 11, 1918, he was admitted to the U.S. National Home for Disabled Volunteer Soldiers in Dayton, Ohio, where he was diagnosed as suffering from arteriosclerosis and myocarditis, as well as an "old injury to head". His admissions ledger entry also noted that he was 5'7" tall with dark hair, blue eyes and a fair complexion, that he was separated from his wife at this time, that he had been employed as a mason prior to his admission to the soldiers' home, and that his nearest living relative was his nephew, John L. Ramsey, who lived in Hollidays Cove, West Virginia. He was then discharged from the home, at his own request, on March 25 of that same year.

During the fall of 1924, his daughter, Ella, died in Hollidays Cove, West Virginia. Following her death on October 19, her remains were returned to Pennsylvania, and interred at the Paris Cemetery in Washington County.

Suffering from nephritis, Brown finally succumbed to complications from the disease in Hollidays Cove on January 24, 1927. His widow served as the informant on his death certificate. His remains were returned to Pennsylvania, and interred at the Paris Cemetery in Washington County, Pennsylvania.

== Medal of Honor citation ==
Despite the death of his captain at his side during the assault he continued carrying his log to the defense ditch. While he was laying his log in place he was shot down and thrown into the water. Unmindful of his own wound he, despite the intense fire, dragged five of his comrades from the ditch, wherein they lay wounded, to a place of safety.

== See also ==
- 30th Ohio Infantry
- List of American Civil War Medal of Honor recipients: A–F
- Ohio in the American Civil War
