= Mechling Run =

Stream in West Virginia, USA

Mechling Run Tributary to Harmon Creek
- Location of Mechling Run mouth Mechling Run (the United States)

Location
- Country: United States
- State: West Virginia
- County: Brooke

Physical characteristics
- Source: Potrock Run divide
  - location: about 1.5 miles southeast of Colliers, West Virginia
  - coordinates: 40°21′00″N 080°31′42″W
  - elevation: 1,040 ft (320 m)
- Mouth: Harmon Creek
  - location: Colliers, West Virginia
  - coordinates: 40°22′04″N 080°32′26″W
  - elevation: 787 ft (240 m)
- Length: 1.77 mi (2.85 km)
- Basin size: 1.76 square miles (4.6 km^{2})
- Discharge
  - location: Harmons Creek
  - average: 2.11 cu ft/s (0.060 m^{3}/s) at mouth with Harmon Creek

Basin features
- Progression: Harmon Creek → Ohio River → Mississippi River → Gulf of Mexico
- River system: Ohio River
- Tributaries
  - left: unnamed tributaties
  - right: unnamed tributaries
- Bridges: Robinson Lane, WV 1

Mechling Run is a 1.77 mi (2.85 km) long 1st order tributary to Harmon Creek in Brooke County, West Virginia. This is the only stream of this name in the United States.

== Variant names ==
According to the Geographic Names Information System, it has also been known historically as:

- Meckling Run

== Course ==
Mechling Run rises about 1.5 miles southeast of Colliers, West Virginia, and then flows northwest to join Harmon Creek at Colliers.

== Watershed ==
Mechling Run drains 1.76 square miles (4.6 km^{2}) of area, receives about 40.2 in/year of precipitation, has a wetness index of 295.76, and is about 83% forested.

== See also ==
- List of rivers of West Virginia
