= Mary Hayward =

Mary Hayward may refer to:

- Mary Ann Hayward (born 1960), Canadian amateur golfer
- Mary Donaghy (born 1939), or Mary Hayward, New Zealand former high jumper and long jumper
- Mary E. Smith Hayward (1842–1938), American businesswoman
- Mary Hayward Weir (1915–1968), born Mary Emma Hayward, American steel heiress and socialite
