= Paris Run =

Stream in Pennsylvania, USA

Paris Run Tributary to Harmon Creek
- Location of Paris Run mouth Paris Run (the United States)

Location
- Country: United States
- State: West Virginia; Pennsylvania
- Counties: Brooke (WV); Hancock (WV); Washington (PA)

Physical characteristics
- Source: Kings Creek divide
  - location: Paris, Pennsylvania
  - coordinates: 40°24′14″N 080°31′16″W
  - elevation: 1,140 ft (350 m)
- Mouth: Harmon Creek
  - location: about 2 miles east of Colliers, West Virginia
  - coordinates: 40°22′05″N 080°31′03″W
  - elevation: 830 ft (250 m)
- Length: 2.59 mi (4.17 km)
- Basin size: 1.79 square miles (4.6 km^{2})
- Discharge
  - location: Harmons Creek
  - average: 2.13 cu ft/s (0.060 m^{3}/s) at mouth with Harmon Creek

Basin features
- Progression: Harmon Creek → Ohio River → Mississippi River → Gulf of Mexico
- River system: Ohio River
- Tributaries
  - left: unnamed tributaties
  - right: unnamed tributaries
- Bridges: US 22

Paris Run is a 2.59 mi (4.17 km) long 1st order tributary to Harmon Creek in Washington County, Pennsylvania. This is the only stream of this names in the United States.

== Course ==
Paris Run rises at Paris, Pennsylvania, and then flows south, straddling the West Virginia-Pennsylvania Stateline to join Harmon Creek about 2 miles east of Colliers, West Virginia.

== Watershed ==
Paris Run drains 1.79 square miles (4.6 km^{2}) of area, receives about 40.1 in/year of precipitation, has a wetness index of 330.65, and is about 60% forested.

== See also ==
- List of rivers of Pennsylvania
- List of rivers of West Virginia
