= Ward Run (Harmon Creek tributary) =

Stream in Pennsylvania, USA

Ward Run Tributary to Harmon Creek
- Location of Ward Run mouth Ward Run (Harmon Creek tributary) (the United States)

Location
- Country: United States
- State: Pennsylvania
- County: Washington (PA)

Physical characteristics
- Source: unnamed tributary to Kings Creek divide
  - location: about 1.5 miles southwest of Florence, Pennsylvania
  - coordinates: 40°25′14″N 080°27′40″W
  - elevation: 1,218 ft (371 m)
- Mouth: Harmon Creek
  - location: Hanlin Station, Pennsylvania
  - coordinates: 40°22′04″N 080°27′40″W
  - elevation: 896 ft (273 m)
- Length: 3.72 mi (5.99 km)
- Basin size: 3.05 square miles (7.9 km^{2})
- Discharge
  - location: Harmons Creek
  - average: 3.70 cu ft/s (0.105 m^{3}/s) at mouth with Harmon Creek

Basin features
- Progression: Harmon Creek → Ohio River → Mississippi River → Gulf of Mexico
- River system: Ohio River
- Tributaries
  - left: unnamed tributaties
  - right: unnamed tributaries
- Bridges: US 22, Acid Dump Road, Hanlin Station Road, Bartleyville Road

Ward Run is a 3.72 mi (5.99 km) long 1st order tributary to Harmon Creek in Washington County, Pennsylvania.

== Course ==
Ward Run rises about 1.5 miles southwest of Florence, Pennsylvania, and then flows south to join Harmon Creek at Hanlin Station.

== Watershed ==
Ward Run drains 3.05 square miles (7.9 km^{2}) of area, receives about 40.4 in/year of precipitation, has a wetness index of 334.15, and is about 78% forested.

== See also ==
- List of rivers of Pennsylvania
