= Hollidays Cove, West Virginia =

Neighborhood in Weirton, West Virginia, U.S.

Coordinates: 40°24′2″N 80°35′23″W

Hollidays Cove is a neighborhood in Weirton, West Virginia, United States. Founded in 1793, Hollidays Cove was the earliest permanent white settlement in what was then Brooke County, Virginia, later becoming Hancock County, West Virginia. The settlement was named after John Holliday, who built a log cabin in a valley (or "cove", in local terminology) on Harmon's Creek in 1776.

== History ==
Holliday's Cove, which is now most of downtown Weirton, was founded as a small village in the late 18th century. (It eventually lost the apostrophe.) In 1909, Ernest T. Weir arrived from neighboring Pittsburgh and built a steel mill later known as Weirton Steel Corporation just north of Holliday's Cove. An unincorporated settlement called Weirton grew up around the mill that by 1940 was said to be the largest unincorporated city in the United States. By then Hollidays Cove and two other outlying areas, Weirton Heights and Marland Heights, which as their names suggest were on hilltops or ridges surrounding the "Weir–Cove" area, had also incorporated.

Hollidays Cove Fort was a Revolutionary War fortification constructed in 1774 by soldiers from Ft. Pitt. It was located in what is now downtown Weirton, along Harmons Creek (named for Harmon Greathouse), about three miles from its mouth on the Ohio River. It was commanded by Colonel Andrew Van Swearingen (1741–1793) and later by his son-in-law, Captain Samuel Brady (1756–1795), the famous leader of Brady's Rangers. In 1779, over 28 militia were garrisoned at Hollidays Cove. Two years earlier, Colonel Van Swearingen led a dozen soldiers by longboat down the Ohio to help rescue the inhabitants of Ft. Henry in Wheeling in a siege by the British and Indian tribes in 1777. That mission was memorialized in a WPA-era mural painted on the wall of the Cove Post Office by Charles S. Chapman (1879–1962). The mural features Col. John Bilderback, who later gained infamy as the leader of the massacre of the Moravian Indians in Gnadenhutten in 1782.

In April 1909 the Phillips Sheet and Tin Plate Company of Clarksburg (Ernest T. Weir, President) bought 105 acres (0.42 km^{2}) of apple orchard north of Hollidays Cove. By the end of the year, ten mills were operating on the site, and a boomtown called Weirton had begun to grow up near the mills. In 1912 Hollidays Cove became incorporated.

After an April referendum passed, on July 1, 1947, the city of Weirton was created by merging incorporated and unincorporated areas of Weirton, Weirton Heights, Marland Heights and Hollidays Cove. Thomas C. Millsop, President of Weirton Steel, won a landslide victory as the first mayor of Weirton.

== See also ==
- Weirton Steel
