= Mary Weir =

Mary Weir may refer to:

- Molly Weir (Mary Weir, 1910–2004), Scottish actress
- Mary Hayward Weir (1915–1968), American steel heiress and socialite
- Mary Jo Deschanel (Mary Jo Weir, born 1945), American actress
