= ISG Weirton Steel =

American steelmaker

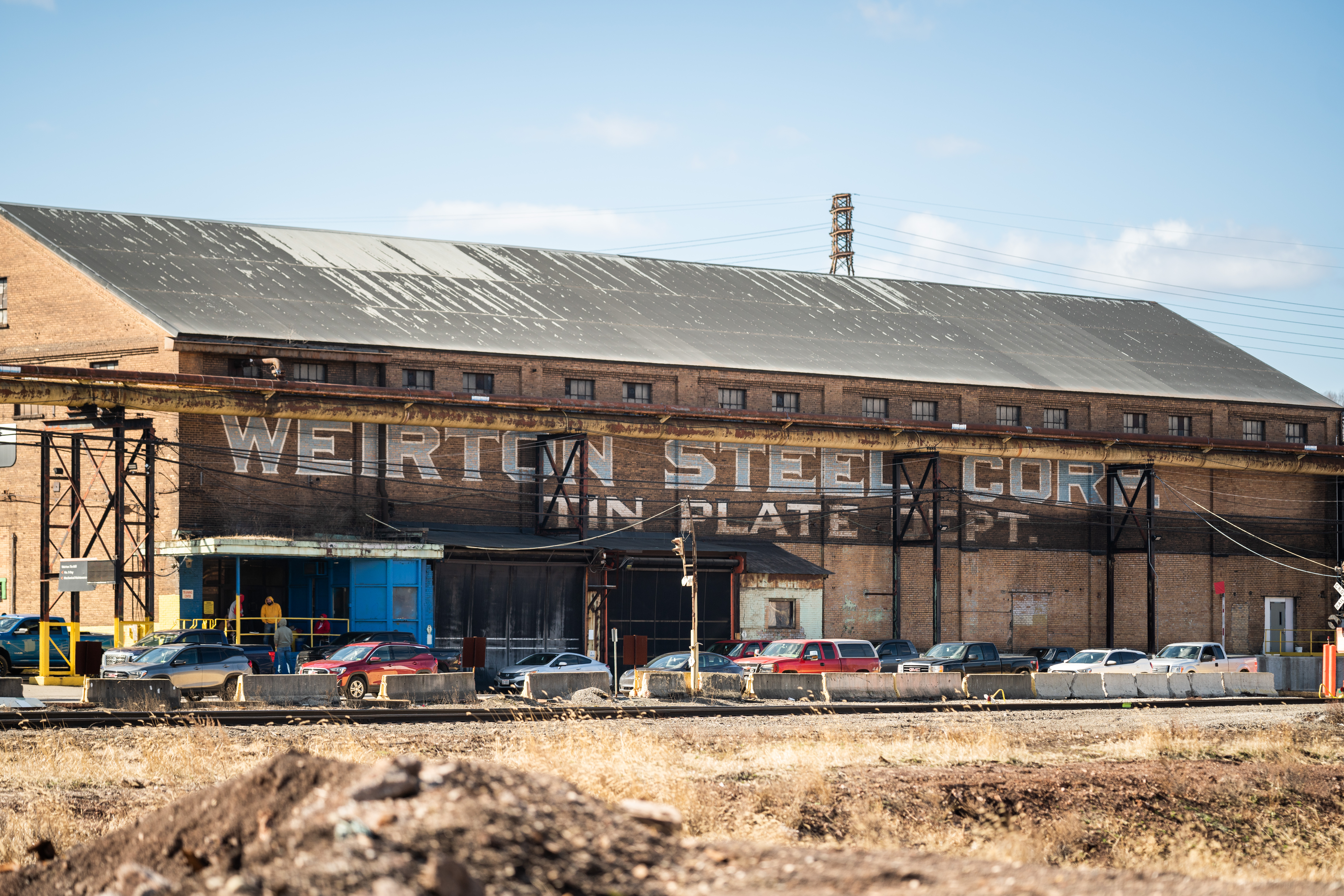
Former Weirton Steel building in February 2023

Weirton Steel Corporation was a steel production company founded by Ernest T. Weir in West Virginia in 1909. It was at one time one of the world's largest producers of tin plate products.

== History ==
Weirton Steel Corporation was an integrated steel mill founded in 1909 by Ernest T. Weir. In 1905, Weir and his partner, James Phillips, bought a tin mill in Clarksburg, West Virginia. In 1909, they relocated to Hollidays Cove, West Virginia, and expanded the operation. The location was chosen due to the abundant water supply, much needed for steel production, and the convenient access to major steel markets.

In 1929, Weir merged Weirton Steel with Detroit's Michigan Steel and Cleveland's M. A. Hanna Company to form National Steel Corporation. National Steel became one of the largest steel producers in the United States, but by the end of the century, the company was experiencing financial difficulties.

Weirton Steel became the largest Employee Stock Ownership Plan (ESOP) steel plant in the world when employees purchased stocks in the 1980s. After Weirton Steel filed for bankruptcy, with 3,000 employees, Ohio-based International Steel Group (ISG) submitted a low offer of $237 million. On April 22, 2004, U.S. federal bankruptcy Judge L. Edward Friend II ruled that ISG could purchase Weirton Steel. By court order, the assets were then auctioned, with most being acquired by ISG, which formed a new division called ISG Weirton Steel.

On April 5, 2005, ISG completed a merger with Mittal Steel. In 2006, Mittal Steel completed a further merger with Arcelor, forming a new company known as ArcelorMittal.

In December 2020, ArcelorMittal sold its U.S. holdings to Ohio-based Cleveland-Cliffs Inc. making it a subsidiary of the Cleveland-Cliffs organization.

On February 15, 2024, Cleveland-Cliffs announced that it would shut down the Weirton tinworks on April 16th, with CEO Lourenco Goncalves stating that the United States International Trade Commission overturning an earlier Department of Commerce ruling allowing for higher tariffs on tinplate imports rendered the facility unprofitable to operate. Over 900 employees are affected by the closure of this facility. U.S. Senator Joe Manchin declared the ITC turned "a blind eye to nearly 1,000 hard-working employees," and that "Cleveland-Cliffs’ closure is an absolute injustice not only to American workers, but to the very principle of fair competition, and it will undoubtedly weaken our economic and national security."

== Weirton Steel Works ==
Located in Weirton, West Virginia, the integrated steel mill had four blast furnaces (1919, 1926, 1941 and 1952), an open-hearth shop (1920) and a bessemer converter (1936). It was one of the world's largest producers of tin plate products. A basic oxygen plant was constructed in 1965.

In May 2023, Form Energy began building a manufacturing facility producing iron-air batteries for electrical storage at the Weirton mill site.

== See also ==
- List of steel producers
