= Marland Heights Park and Margaret Manson Weir Memorial Pool =

- U.S. National Register of Historic Places
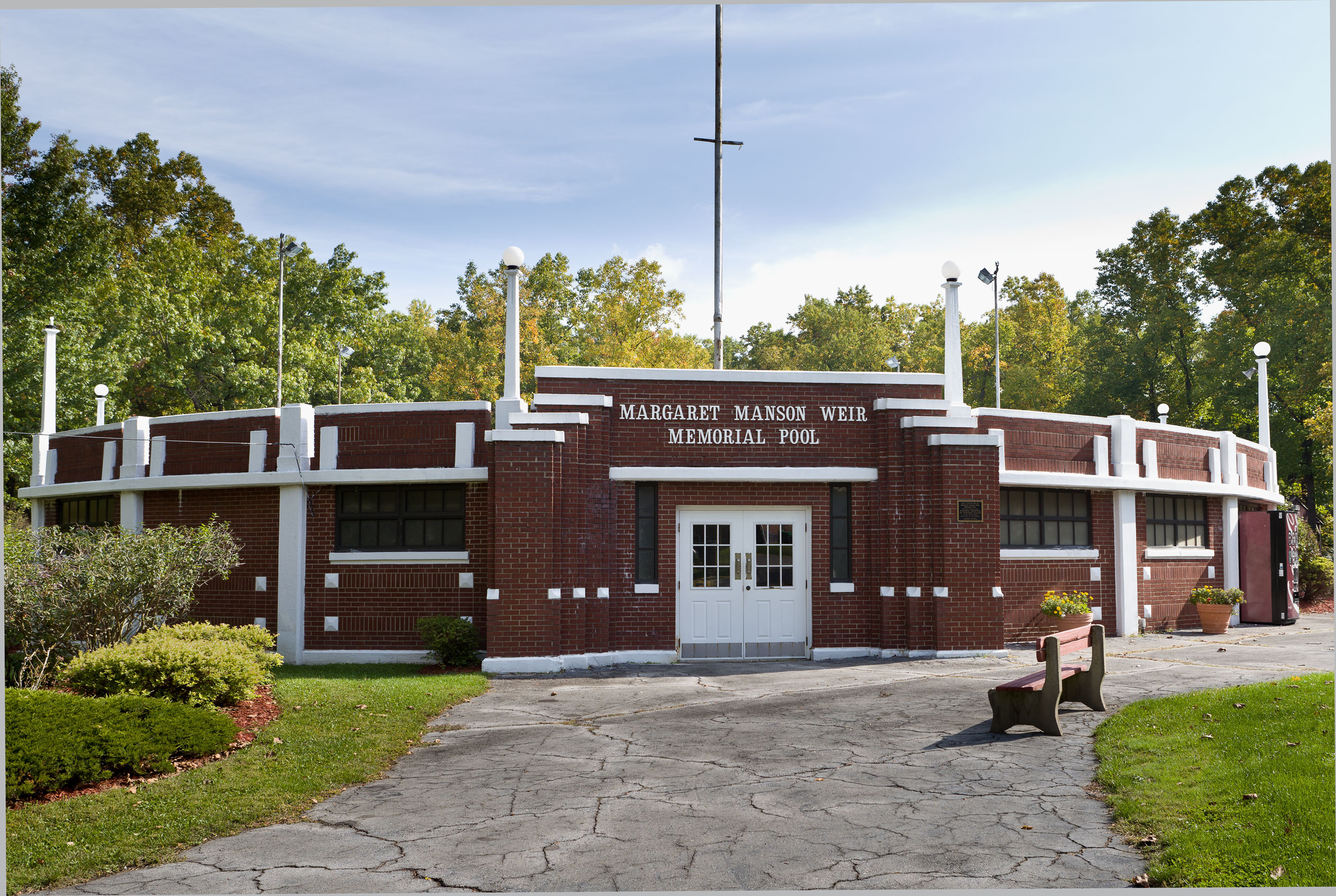
- Weir Memorial Pool

- Location within West Virginia Location within the United States
- Location: Jct. of Williams Dr. and Riverview Dr., Weirton, West Virginia
- Coordinates: 40°24′14″N 80°35′59″W
- Area: 4.3 acres (1.7 ha)
- Built: 1934
- Architect: Bintz, Wesley
- Architectural style: Art Deco
- NRHP reference No.: 93001230
- Added to NRHP: November 15, 1993

Marland Heights Park and Margaret Manson Weir Memorial Pool is a historic park and swimming pool located at Weirton, Hancock County, West Virginia, United States. The Park was dedicated in July 1934 and is a contributing site. It has two contributing structures and one building; the Margaret Manson Weir Memorial Pool, a large wood timber and stone picnic shelter, and a tool shed. The ovoid-shaped pool was built in 1934, with funds from the David Weir Estate and maintenance support from the Weirton Steel Corporation. The main entrance to the pool features Art Deco style design features.

It was listed on the National Register of Historic Places in 1993. The pool was demolished in December 2022.
