= Dunbar Recreation Center =

- U.S. National Register of Historic Places
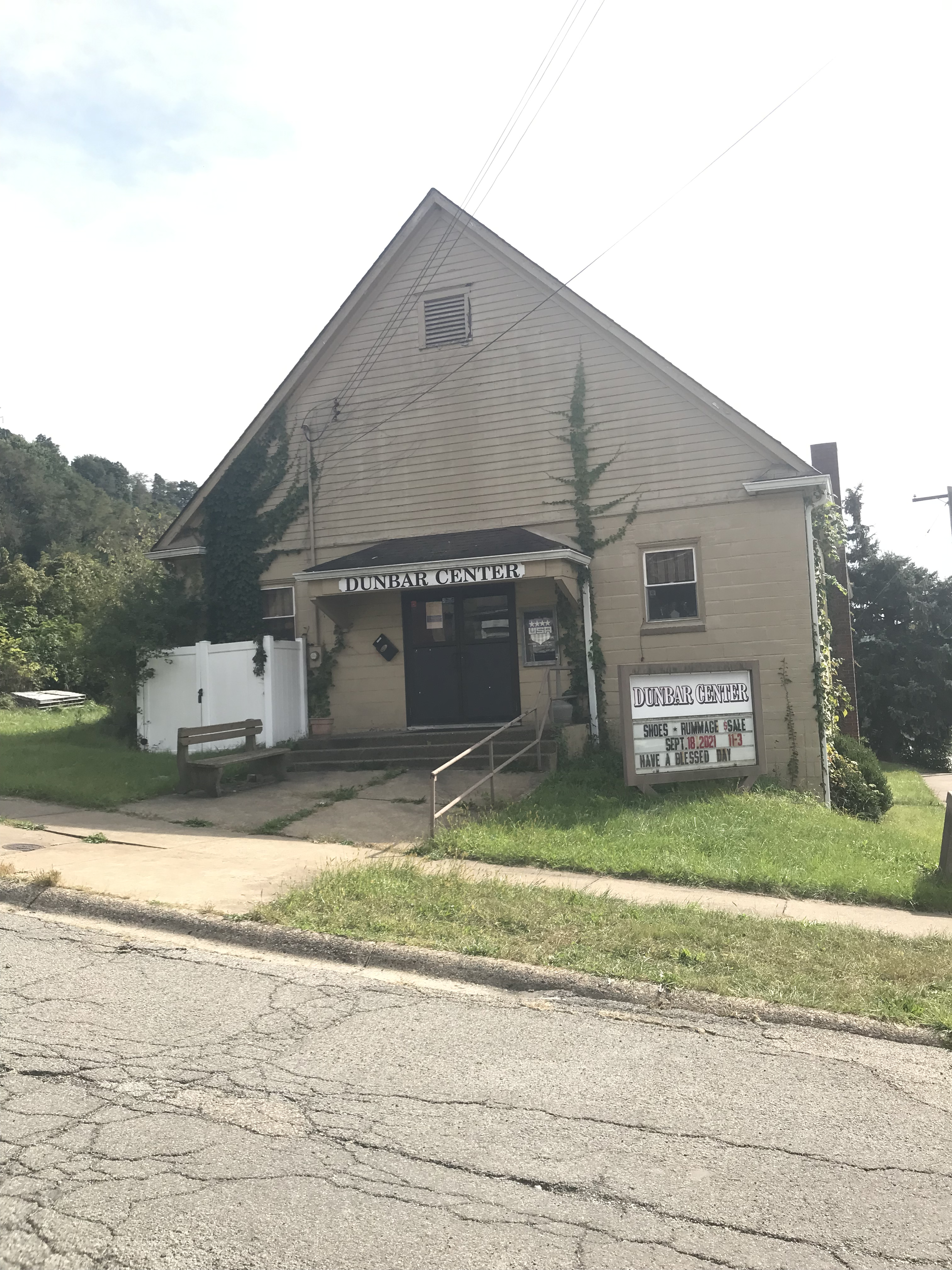
- Dunbar Recreation Center in 2021

- Location within West Virginia Location within the United States
- Location: 300 Kessel St, Weirton, West Virginia 26062
- Coordinates: 40°24′45″N 80°35′04″W
- Built: 1944
- NRHP reference No.: 100006740
- Added to NRHP: July 22, 2021

The Dunbar Recreation Center is a historic building located in Weirton in Hancock County, West Virginia. The building was listed on the National Register of Historic Places in 2021.

== History ==
The Dunbar Recreation Center is located on a slight rise at the corner of Weir Avenue and Kessel Street in Weirton, West Virginia. Its west façade overlooks the former mill area of Weirton, a landscape undergoing significant change as industrial structures are dismantled. The center sits in a semi-urban neighborhood, one block north of the 1939 Dunbar High School and directly across Weir Avenue from Mt. Olive Baptist Church.

Constructed in 1944, the one-story, front-gabled meeting hall is built of concrete block in a modest, utilitarian style, with limited decorative features aside from brick window surrounds and quoins. The building features a high-pitched roof, ground-level entrances on both street-facing elevations, taupe-painted concrete block walls, and wooden siding in the gable ends.

Except for a door addition on the southern end of the west elevation, repairs to the same wall following an automobile accident, and the installation of a dropped ceiling in the auditorium, the building retains a high degree of architectural integrity. Its interior layout, exterior appearance, and fenestration remain largely unchanged.

The Dunbar Recreation Center continues to serve as an active community gathering space, maintaining its historic feeling and association within the neighborhood. It is regularly used for events such as wedding receptions, baby showers, graduation parties, and other social functions.

== See also ==
- National Register of Historic Places listings in Hancock County, West Virginia
