= Peter Tarr Furnace Site =

- U.S. National Register of Historic Places
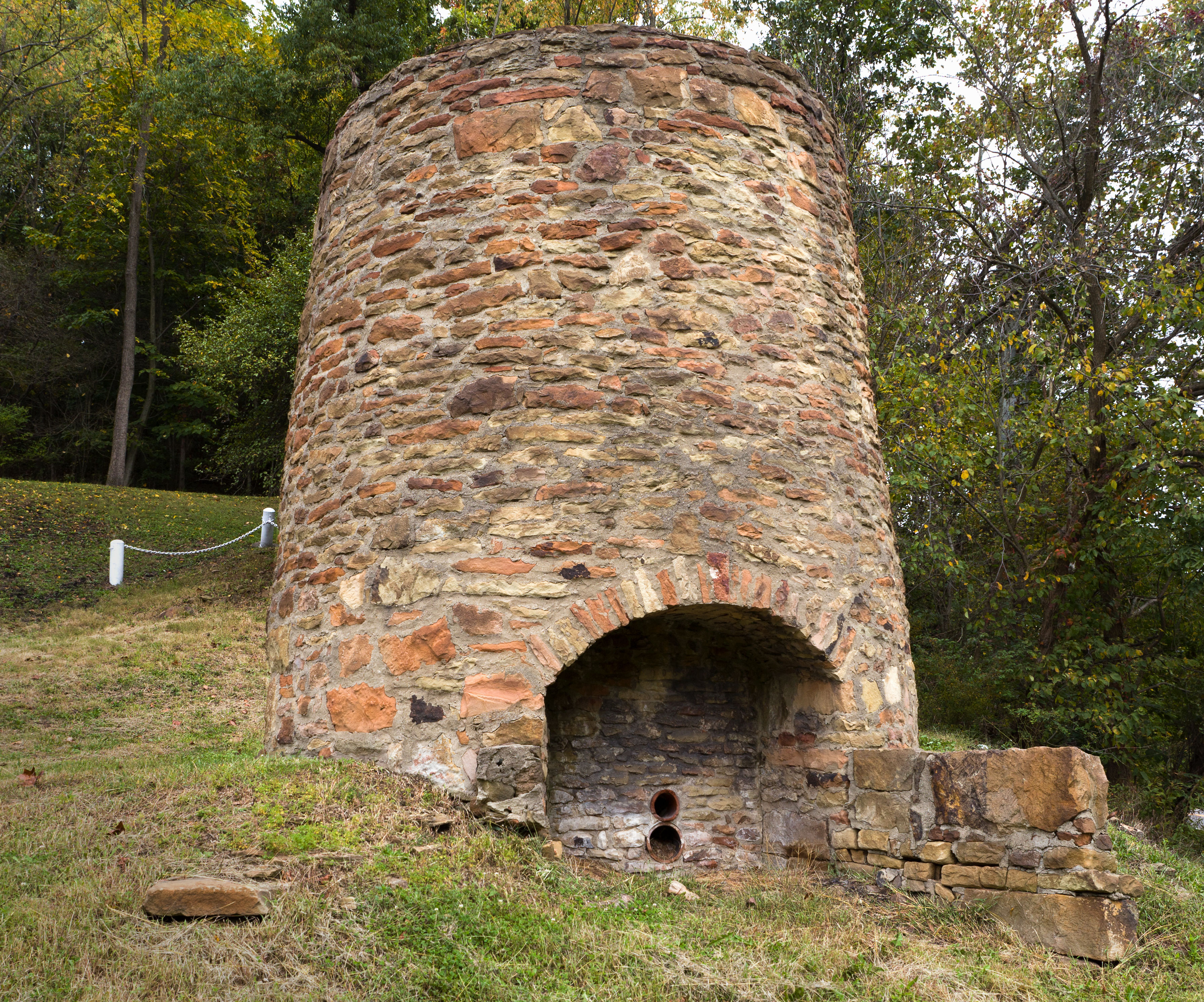
- Nearest city: Weirton, West Virginia
- Area: 1.5 acres (0.61 ha)
- Built: 1790
- NRHP reference No.: 76001935
- Added to NRHP: January 1, 1976

The Peter Tarr Furnace was the first iron furnace west of the Alleghenies. The furnace was built in the 1790s by a man named Grant on property owned by American pioneer James Campbell along Kings Creek near modern Weirton, West Virginia in Hancock County. Peter Tarr purchased the business shortly after its construction, as Grant was no longer able to maintain it. Along with a partner, Peter Tarr then established the firm of Connell, Tarr, & Company. A forerunner to the modern steel mill, the furnace was fueled using local timber and produced about two tons of metal daily.

The metal produced at the mill was typically used to make cooking utensils and iron grates. However, during the War of 1812 the metal was used to cast the cannonballs used by Commodore Oliver H. Perry in the 1813 Battle of Lake Erie.

The furnace remained in operation until 1840. In 1968 the shell of the furnace was reconstructed as a permanent landmark.
