= Weirton Heights, West Virginia =

- Neighborhood
- Location within West Virginia
- Coordinates: 40°24′30″N 80°32′21″W
- Country: United States
- State: West Virginia
- County: Hancock
- Elevation: 1,197 ft (365 m)
- Time zone: UTC-5 (Eastern (EST))
  - Summer (DST): UTC-4 (EDT)
- GNIS ID: 1555933

Weirton Heights is a neighborhood of Weirton, West Virginia, United States.

Weirton Heights is located along WV 105 east of downtown Weirton.

Weirton Heights was incorporated in 1938, and was named for steel manufacturer Ernest T. Weir.
