= Johnston-Truax House =

Historic house in West Virginia, United States

- U.S. National Register of Historic Places
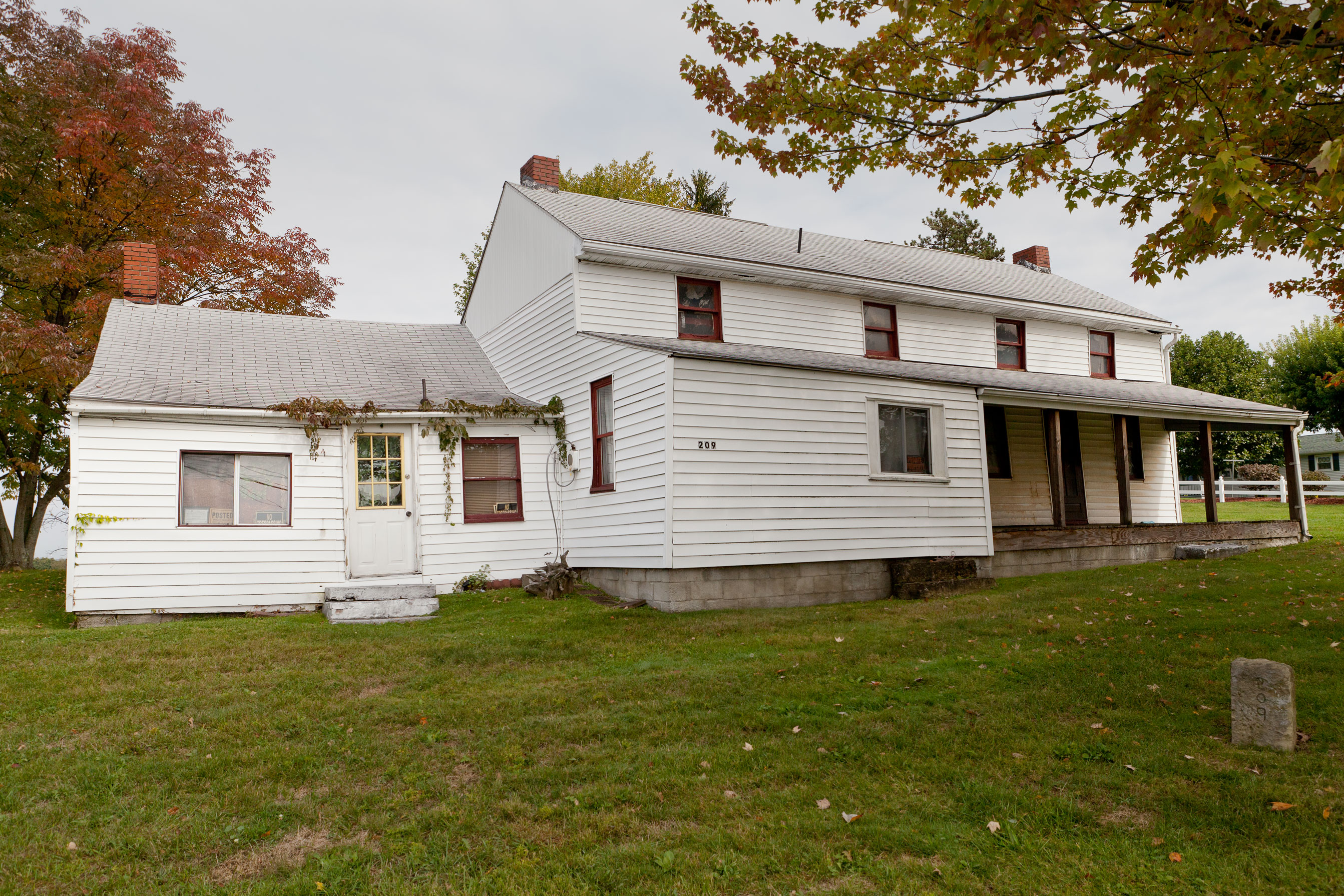
- Johnston-Truax House, September 2012

- Location within West Virginia Location within the United States
- Location: 209 Seneca St., Weirton, West Virginia
- Coordinates: 40°25′54″N 80°33′11″W
- Area: less than one acre
- Built: 1785
- Architect: Johnston, Benjamin, Jr.
- NRHP reference No.: 93000611
- Added to NRHP: September 23, 1993

Johnston-Truax House is a historic home located at Weirton, Hancock County, West Virginia. The original log section was built in 1784, and expanded about 1850 and in 1886. It is a 1 1/2-story building with a one-story wing. It has log walls covered with clapboard and in turn with siding. It features a full porch with a shed roof.

It was listed on the National Register of Historic Places in 1993.
