= Mary Hayward Weir =

American socialite

Mary Hayward Weir, born Mary Emma Hayward (1915–1968), was an American steel heiress and socialite. She was the wealthy widow of Pittsburgh steel king Ernest T. Weir, and the former wife of Polish author Jerzy Kosiński. The Mary H. Weir Public Library in Weirton, West Virginia is named after her.

== Personal life ==
Born in Indianapolis, Indiana, she was working as a secretary for the National Steel Corporation in 1941 when she met and later married her boss, chairman and CEO Ernest T. Weir. She divorced her first husband, Donald Reeve, to marry Weir. Ernest was 40 years her senior and was recently divorced with two grown sons roughly Mary's age.

Mary Hayward and Ernest T. Weir were married on December 11, 1941, and together had one son, David Weir, born in 1944. She was widowed in 1957 when her husband died at the age of 81.

On January 11, 1962, she married the Polish author Jerzy Kosiński after a romance of 18 months. Kosiński had emigrated from Poland in December 1957 to the United States.

Weir and Kosiński met in the summer of 1960 in New York City when the heiress hired the young Kosiński to catalog her private library. Weir was a close friend of coffee heiress Abigail Folger of the Folgers Coffee family, and it was through her husband Jerzy Kosiński that Folger met her future boyfriend Wojciech Frykowski (Folger and Frykowski were murdered in 1969 by the Manson Family). In 1966, Weir divorced Kosiński.

Weir was known for her never-ending volunteer work in many different areas as well as her extensive travels around the world. She was known to have had many serious bouts of depression beginning as far back as 1950, and at times, experienced blackouts as a result of them. She also was an alcoholic for years.

== Cultural references ==
On June 2, 1958, in Weirton, West Virginia, the Mary H. Weir Public Library was named in her honor with Weir's cutting the ribbon in person.

In 1965, Kosiński dedicated his novel The Painted Bird to her. Around this time, the illness which would ultimately claim her life began to show symptoms. Kosiński wrote a roman à clef about his marriage to Weir in 1977 in the novel Blind Date, referring to her as "Mary–Jane Kirkland".

== Death ==
Mary Hayward Weir was diagnosed with a brain tumour, of which she died on August 1, 1968, aged 52 or 53. She left Kosiński nothing in her will.
