= Form Energy =

Energy storage company

- Type: Private
- Industry: Energy
- Founded: 2017; 9 years ago
- Headquarters: Somerville, MA, US
- Key people: Mateo Jaramillo (CEO)
- Website: formenergy.com

Form Energy is an American energy storage company focused on developing energy storage systems to enable a year-round electric grid. Form Energy's first commercial product is a rechargeable iron-air battery capable of cost-effectively storing electricity for 100 hours at a time.

== History ==
Form Energy was founded in 2017 by former head of battery development for Tesla Mateo Jaramillo, MIT professor and battery scientist Yet-Ming Chiang, Ted Wiley, William Woodford and Marco Ferrara.

In December 2022, the company announced its first manufacturing plant site: 55 acres in Weirton, West Virginia. The US$760 million project was expected to employ ~750 workers and to begin initial shipments in 2024. The plant's construction will be funded in part by the state of West Virginia with $105 million in surplus tax dollars.

In January 2023, the eight-state utility Xcel Energy contracted for two systems, at Pueblo, Colorado, and at Becker, Minnesota. Each project is to provide 10 megawatts of instantaneous power for up to 100 hours, and store 1 gigawatt-hour.

In 2024, Form engineered a system that converts powdered iron ore to metallic iron using a low-temperature alkaline solution stimulated by electric current. This can be run continuously at high efficiency, and it can be scaled up in smaller increments.

In 2026, Google contracted Form Energy for a clean energy battery supply agreement to power a data center in Minnesota. The system is designed to deliver 300 megawatts of electricity continuously for 100 hours (30 gigawatt-hours). In March 2026, Form Energy and Crusoe announced a capacity agreement for 12 gigawatt-hours of iron-air battery systems, with deliveries scheduled to begin in 2027.

== Technology ==
The active components of Form Energy's iron-air battery system are iron, water, and air. The basic principle of operation is reversible rusting (oxidation). While discharging, the battery breathes in oxygen from the air and converts iron metal to rust. While charging, the application of an electrical current converts the rust back to iron and the battery breathes out oxygen.

Each individual battery is about the size of a washing machine. Each of these modules is filled with a water-based, non-flammable electrolyte, similar to the electrolyte used in AA batteries. Inside the liquid electrolyte are stacks of between 10 and 20 meter-scale cells, which include iron electrodes and air electrodes, the parts of the battery that enable the electrochemical reactions to store and discharge electricity.

The battery modules are grouped together in modular megawatt-scale power blocks, which comprise thousands of battery modules in an environmentally protected enclosure. Depending on the system size, tens to hundreds of these power blocks will be connected to the electricity grid. In its least dense configuration, a one megawatt system requires about an acre of land. Higher density configurations can achieve greater than three megawatts per acre.

The company has demonstrated that its batteries are capable of storing energy to deliver the 100+ hour duration required to make wind power, hydropower, and solar energy reliable year round, and claims less than 1/10th the cost of lithium-ion battery technology. Cells underwent a UL9540A fire test in 2024.

== Finance ==
Investors include Breakthrough Energy Ventures, itself funded by Microsoft co-founder Bill Gates and Amazon founder Jeff Bezos, Coatue Management, TPG (through TPG Rise Climate), steel manufacturer ArcelorMittal, Perry Creek Capital, NGP Energy Technology Partners III, Temasek, Energy Impact Partners, Prelude Ventures, MIT’s investment fund The Engine, Capricorn Investment Group, Eni Next, and Macquarie Capital.

In August 2021, Form Energy announced the close of a $240 million Series D financing round led by ArcelorMittal’s XCarb™ innovation fund. In October 2022, they closed a $450 million series E round led by TPG Rise.

== See also ==
- Grid energy storage
- Metal–air electrochemical cell
