= Ernest T. Weir =

American steel manufacturer

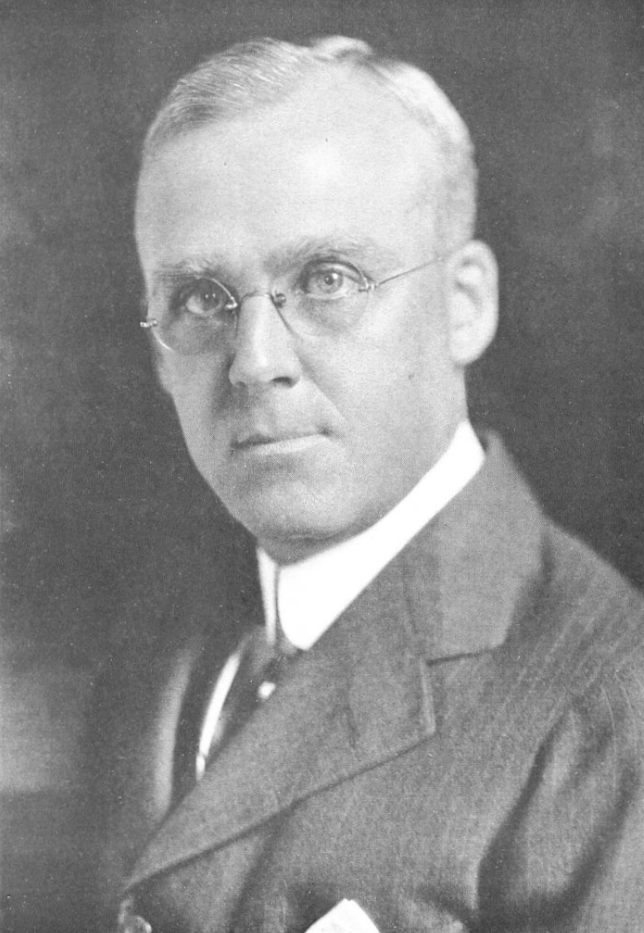
- Weir c. 1923
- Born: Ernest Tener Weir; August 1, 1875; Pittsburgh, Pennsylvania, U.S.
- Died: June 26, 1957 (aged 81); Philadelphia, Pennsylvania, U.S.
- Occupation: Industrialist
- Years active: 1905-1956
- Known for: Founder of Weirton Steel, the National Steel Corporation, and Weirton, West Virginia
- Spouses: Mary Kline (m. 1899, divorced) Aeola Dickson Siebert (m. 1925; div. 1941) Mary Hayward Weir (m. 1941)

Ernest Tener Weir (August 1, 1875 — June 26, 1957) was an American steel manufacturer best known for having founded both Weirton Steel (which became National Steel Corporation) and the town of Weirton, West Virginia.

Weir was well known in the 1930s for opposing President Franklin D. Roosevelt's New Deal program, for resisting union organizing drives by the Amalgamated Association of Iron and Steel Workers and its successor, the United Steelworkers, and for challenging the legal authority of the National Labor Relations Board.

Weir was called "the lone wolf" of the American steel industry for his willingness to oppose unionization and refusal to sacrifice his business interests in favor of the steel industry at large.

== Biography ==
=== Early life and career ===
Weir was born in August 1875 in Pittsburgh, Pennsylvania, to James and Margaret Manson Weir. His parents were Scotch-Irish Americans who had only recently immigrated to the United States. His brother, David Manson Weir, was born in 1880. He was educated in the city's public schools. Weir's father ran a livery yard, and the family was poor. Weir would later describe his father as a failure and horse fancier and his mother as a saint.

He left school at the age of 15, when his father died. He obtained a $3-a-week job as an office boy at John Warne Gates' Braddock Wire Company (which manufactured barbed wire), but after a year took a job as a clerk at the Oliver Wire company. He traveled nationwide selling barbed wire. He rose to the position of chief clerk at Oliver Wire (similar to the position of chief financial officer today), then joined the American Sheet and Tin Plate Company. He was promoted to the position of general manager of its plant in Monongahela, Pennsylvania. He became close friends with James R. Phillips, who ran the tin plate sales division for US Steel.

=== Marriages ===
On October 10, 1899, Weir married Mary Kline of Pittsburgh. The couple had a daughter, Dorothy Manson Weir, and twin sons, Henry Kline Weir and Ernest Tener Weir Jr.

On January 12, 1925, Weir married Aeola Dickson Siebert. The couple had no children. In 1941, accompanied by her sons and a daughter in law, she moved to Okeechobee County, Florida, and obtained a divorce on November 14, 1941 from Weir on the basis of mental cruelty and desertion. Weir was then free to wed his third wife 27 days later.

On December 11, 1941, the 66-year-old Weir married 25-year-old Mary Emma Hayward. Hayward was Weir's secretary. She divorced her husband, Donald Reeve, to marry Weir. The couple had one son, David Manson Weir II.

=== Death ===
Weir suffered a severe heart attack at his vacation home on Jupiter Island, Florida in mid-January 1957. After some recovery, he was taken to New York City and underwent what the press described as "minor" surgery in April. His health, vigorous up to that time, quickly declined and he retired as chairman of National Steel on April 24, 1957.

Weir suffered a cerebral hemorrhage and on April 21 was hospitalized at the Institute of the Pennsylvania Hospital in Philadelphia. He returned home but suffered additional cerebral hemorrhages and was hospitalized in mid-June. He died at the Institute on June 26, 1957.

His funeral was held at Trinity Cathedral in Pittsburgh on June 28, 1957. The funeral was spare: There was no eulogy, and no pall-bearers. He was buried in a private ceremony in Homewood Cemetery in Pittsburgh.

== Work ==
=== Weirton Steel ===
In 1905, Weir and Phillips took out loans of $10,000 and $15,000 (respectively) and organized the Phillips Sheet and Tin Plate Company. They purchased the failing Jackson Sheet and Tin Plate Company in Clarksburg, West Virginia, for $190,000. Phillips died in a train crash a few months after the company was formed, and Weir took as a new partner John C. Williams, a Welsh immigrant who was in charge of all tin plate operations at the plant. They rapidly expanded the eight-mill facility, adding four more mills in 1908. A second plant with 10 mills was opened in Holliday's Cove, West Virginia, in 1909, and expanded by another 10 mills in 1910. That same year, Weir began building a company town next to Holliday's Cove, naming it Weirton. In 1912, Weir purchased the Pope Sheet and Tin Plate Company in Steubenville, Ohio. By 1913, his company was the second largest manufacturer of tin plate in the United States (behind US Steel). Weir focused on vertical integration, purchasing coal mines, coking plants, furnaces, iron mines, ships, and tin mines. On August 1, 1918, (Weir's 43rd birthday), he renamed his firm the Weirton Steel Company.

In 1929, Weir engineered the merger of two other steel companies to form a new concern, National Steel. Weir was convinced, in the face of growing competition as well as the worsening economic situation in the U.S., that Weirton Steel needed to quickly grow much larger. Weir had become close friends with George M. Humphrey, chief executive officer of the M. A. Hanna steel company, and George R. Fink, the chairman of the board of directors of the Michigan Steel Company. In February 1929, Fink had formed the Great Lakes Steel Company to supply steel to the automotive industry in Detroit, Michigan. On September 27, 1929, Weir, Humphrey, and Fink agreed to form a new holding company, National Steel, through a stock swap. Weirton Steel held 50 percent of the stock of the new company, which was formally organized on December 1, 1929. Weir was named chairman of the board, Humphrey was named chairman of the board's executive committee, and Fink was named president. On November 25, 1930, National Steel purchased Fink's Michigan Steel Company for $10 million.

National Steel became the fifth largest steel producer in the United States, and never lost money during the Great Depression. National Steel built a $40 million investment fund to improve its plant and supply chains, and began providing cheap, high-quality steel to most of the American automotive industry.

Weir continued to remain active as leader of Weirton Steel throughout the 1950s. In 1956, he served as national finance chairman for the Republican National Committee.

=== Labor conflicts ===
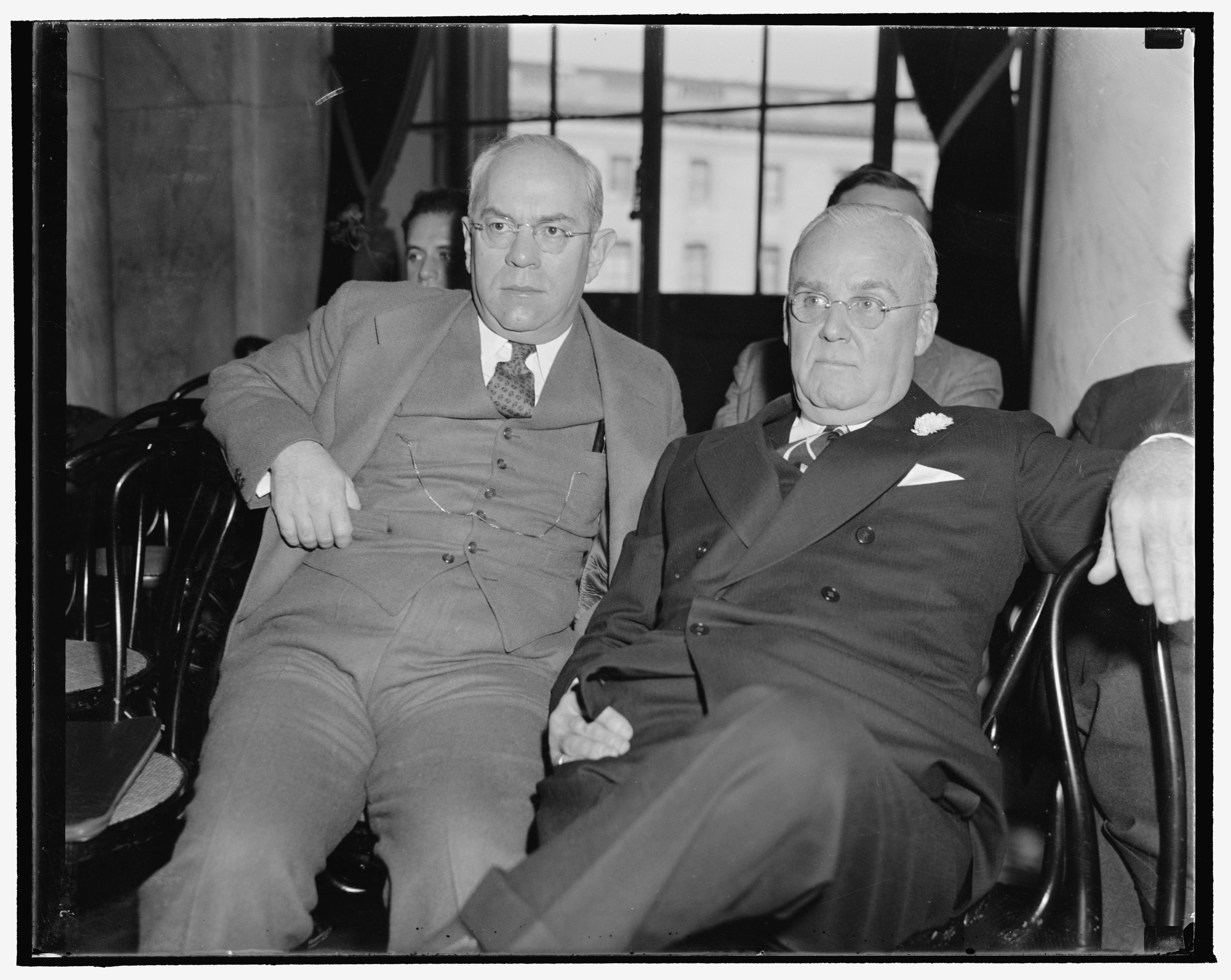
Weir (right) arguing against New Deal reforms before the National Monopoly Committee in Washington, D.C. in November 1939

In 1933, 10,000 workers at Weirton Steel went out on strike in protest against a company union which Weir had imposed on workers. Section 7(a) of the National Industrial Recovery Act guaranteed workers in the United States the right to form a union. Weir sued to have the act overturned on constitutional grounds. On May 29, 1934, the United States District Court for the District of Delaware held in United States v. Weirton Steel Co., 7 F.Supp. 255 (1934), that the act violated the United States Constitution. The federal government appealed to the Supreme Court of the United States. The case was awaiting resolution when the Supreme Court declared the National Industrial Recovery Act unconstitutional on other grounds.

When Congress passed the National Labor Relations Act (NLRA) in 1935, Weir said he would refuse to obey the law. Labor scholar James A. Gross says Weir was prepared to use violence to oppose unionization at his plants. Weir called the NLRA "one of the most vicious pieces of legislation ever proposed." Weir established an "employee representation plan" (a thinly-disguised company union) and the Weirton Steel Employees Security League (whose purpose was to discourage unionization through physical intimidation and violence) to beat back unionization efforts by the United Steelworkers. The effort succeeded, but the union filed an unfair labor practice complaint with the National Labor Relations Board (NLRB). In June 1941, the NLRB ordered Weirton Steel to disband both organizations. Weir did so, but then supported the formation of the new Weirton Independent Union (WIU) and quickly signed a contract with it. The NLRB went to court, accusing Weir of illegally dominating his employees. In 1946, the United States Court of Appeals for the Fourth Circuit appointed a special master to collect evidence in the case. Hearings were held in 1947 and 1948. On February 1, 1950, the special master reported that while Weirton Steel did not create the WIU, it did dominate it illegally. Additionally, the special master found that Weirton Steel had blatantly interfered with workers' organizing rights at its plants. On July 28, 1950, Fourth Circuit upheld the special master, ordered Weirton Steel to withdraw recognition of the WIU, and ordered Weirton Steel to end all violence against workers attempting to organize an independent union. Weir called the court's ruling "pure nonsense" but he reluctantly agreed to comply with it. But in the intervening years, Weir attempted to portray large unions as anti-American. His campaign had an effect. A new, independent union—the Independent Steelworkers Union—formed and battled with the United Steelworkers to represent employees at Weirton Steel. On October 27, 1950, the Independent Steelworkers Union won a federally-supervised union organization election, 7,291 to 3,454. (The United Steelworkers merged with the Independent Steelworkers Union in April 2007.)

== Cultural references and legacy ==
After Weir's death, his widow Mary Hayward Weir married the author Jerzy Kosinski. The character of Ben Rand in Kosinki's novel Being There is based on Weir.

Weir founded People's Bank and the Bank of Weirton (later acquired by WESBANCO); donated $450,000 to build the Mary H. Weir Public Library in Weirton in 1956; built a football stadium at Weir High School; co-founded the Williams Country Club; and built the Margaret Manson Weir Memorial Pool and Park in Weirton, using funds provided by the will of his deceased brother, David Manson Weir.

In November 1952, the Great Lakes Engineering Works launched the SS Ernest T. Weir, a straightdeck bulk carrier. Commissioned by National Steel, at 690 feet (210 m) in length she was the longest ship of her class at the time of her construction.

== Bibliography ==
- Bernstein, Irving. The Turbulent Years: A History of the American Worker, 1933-1941. Reprint ed. Chicago, Ill.: Haymarket Books, 2010.
- The Book of Prominent Pennsylvanians. Pittsburgh, Pa.: Pittsburgh Leader Publishing, 1913.
- Current Biography. Bronx, N.Y.: H.W. Wilson Co., 1941.
- Gross, James A. The Making of the National Labor Relations Board: A Study in Economics, Politics, and the Law. Albany, N.y.: State University of New York Press, 1974.
- Gross, Michael. 740 Park: The Story of the World's Richest Apartment Building. New York: Broadway Books, 2005.
- Hallett, Anthony and Hallett, Diane. Entrepreneur Magazine Encyclopedia of Entrepreneurs. New York: Wiley, 1997.
- Hicks, Jack. In the Singer's Temple. Chapel Hill, N.C.: University of North Carolina Press, 1981.
- Lieber, James B. Friendly Takeover: How an Employee Buyout Saved a Steel Town. New York, N.Y.: Penguin Books, 1995.
- Lupack, Barbara Tepa. Insanity as Redemption in Contemporary American Fiction: Inmates Running the Asylum. Gainesville, Fla.: University Press of Florida, 1995.
- Sloan, James Park. Jerzy Kosinski: A Biography. New York: Dutton, 1996.
- Thompson, Mark L. Steamboats & Sailors of the Great Lakes. Detroit: Wayne State University Press, 1991.
- Varano, Charles S. Forced Choices: Class, Community, and Worker Ownership. Albany, N.Y.: SUNY Press, 1999.
