= Dr. George Rigas House =

Historic house in West Virginia, United States

- U.S. National Register of Historic Places
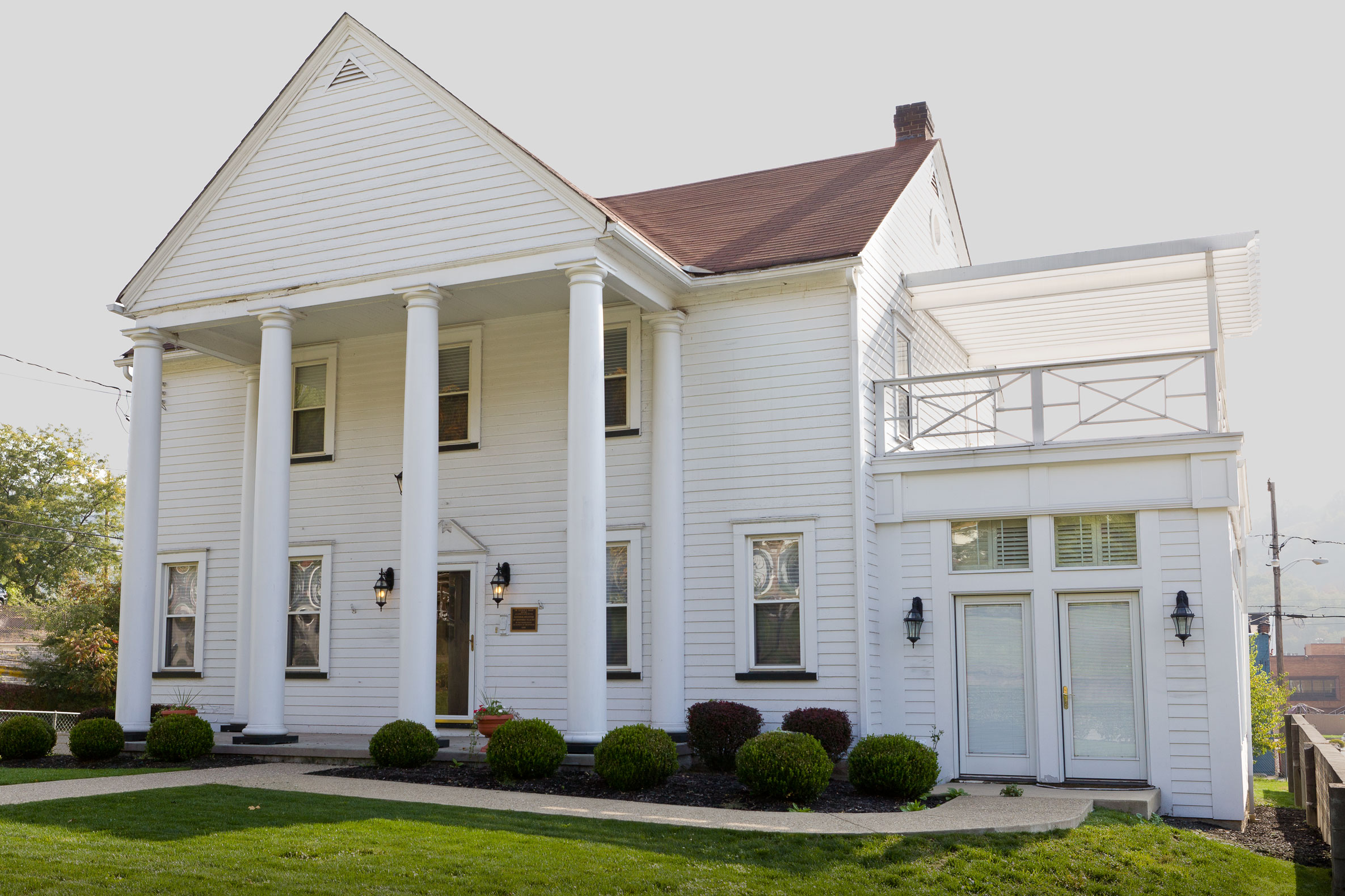
- Dr. George Rigas House, September 2012

- Location within West Virginia Location within the United States
- Location: 3412 West St., Weirton, West Virginia
- Coordinates: 40°24′14″N 80°35′26″W
- Area: less than one acre
- Built: 1936
- Architect: Watson, E.R.
- NRHP reference No.: 04000358
- Added to NRHP: April 21, 2004

The Dr. George Rigas House is a historic home located at Weirton, Hancock County, West Virginia. It was built in 1936, and is a five-bay, 2 1/2-story wood-frame house with clapboard siding and a side gable roof. It has an eclectic style. It features a gable-roofed portico centered on the main elevation and supported by four Tuscan order columns and two pilasters. The house is associated with Dr. George S. Rigas, a prominent local physician who practiced medicine in Weirton.

It was listed on the National Register of Historic Places in 2004.
