= People's Bank (Weirton, West Virginia) =

- U.S. National Register of Historic Places
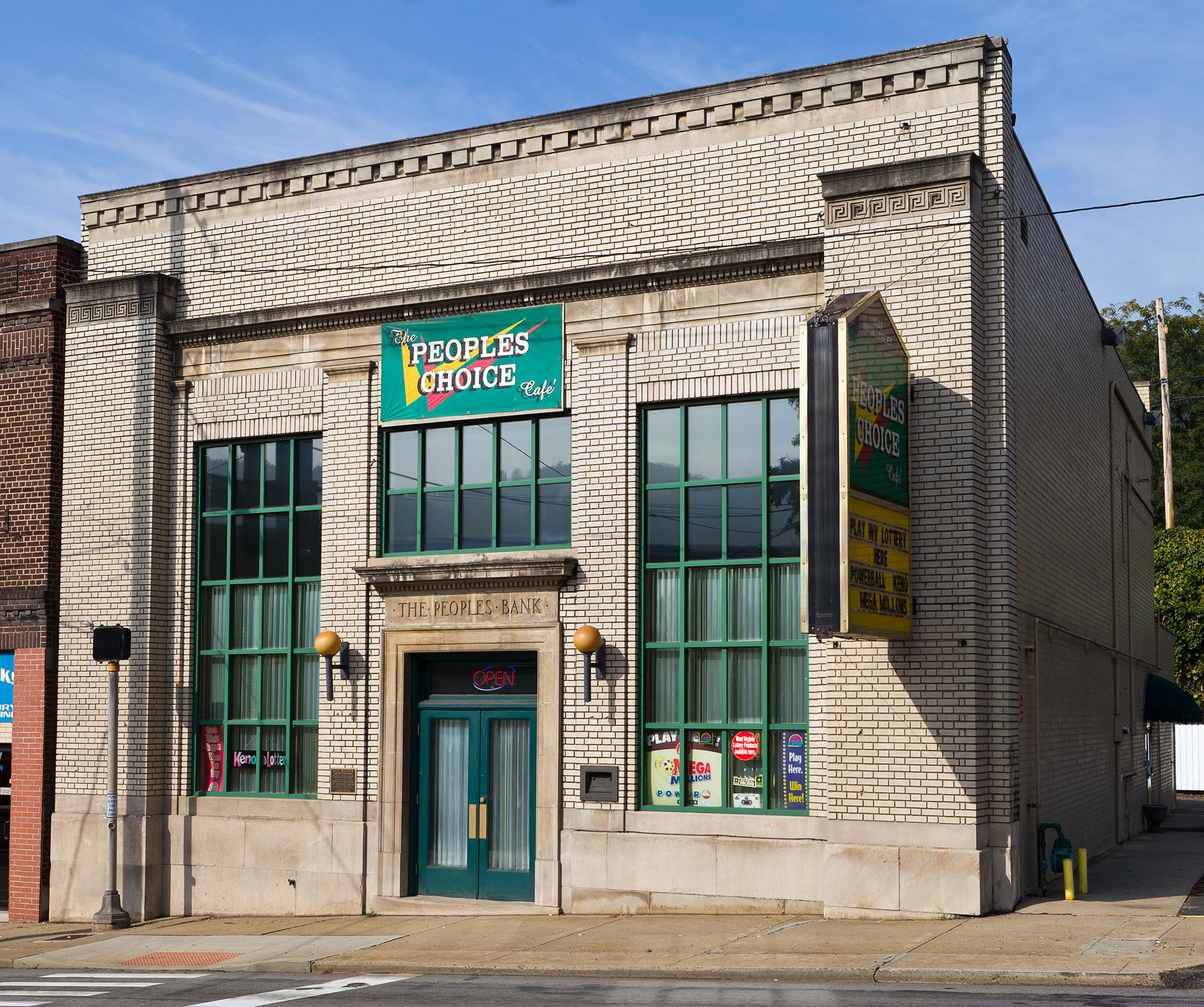
- People's Bank, September 2012

- Location within West Virginia Location within the United States
- Location: 3383 Main St., Weirton, West Virginia
- Coordinates: 40°24′5″N 80°35′3″W
- Area: less than one acre
- Built: 1930
- Architect: Peterson & Clark; Cattrell, Clyde
- Architectural style: Classical Revival
- NRHP reference No.: 95000253
- Added to NRHP: March 17, 1995

People's Bank is a historic bank building located at Weirton, Hancock County, West Virginia. It was built in 1930, and is a small Classical Revival building constructed of concrete, steel, brick and stone. The building is one story with a lower level. It consists of a higher front portion than the rear due to the interior space of the main lobby. The front facade is of cream glazed brick with Indiana limestone details. The building closed in 1962, due to expansion into a larger building with drive-through windows, and sat undisturbed until it was renovated in 1993.

It was listed on the National Register of Historic Places in 1995.
