= Florence, Pennsylvania =

Village in Pennsylvania, U.S.

Coordinates: 40°25′56″N 80°26′01″W

Florence is a village surrounded by Hanover Township, Washington County, in the U.S. state of Pennsylvania.

== History ==
Florence was laid out in 1814.
