= Weirton, West Virginia =

City in West Virginia, US

- City
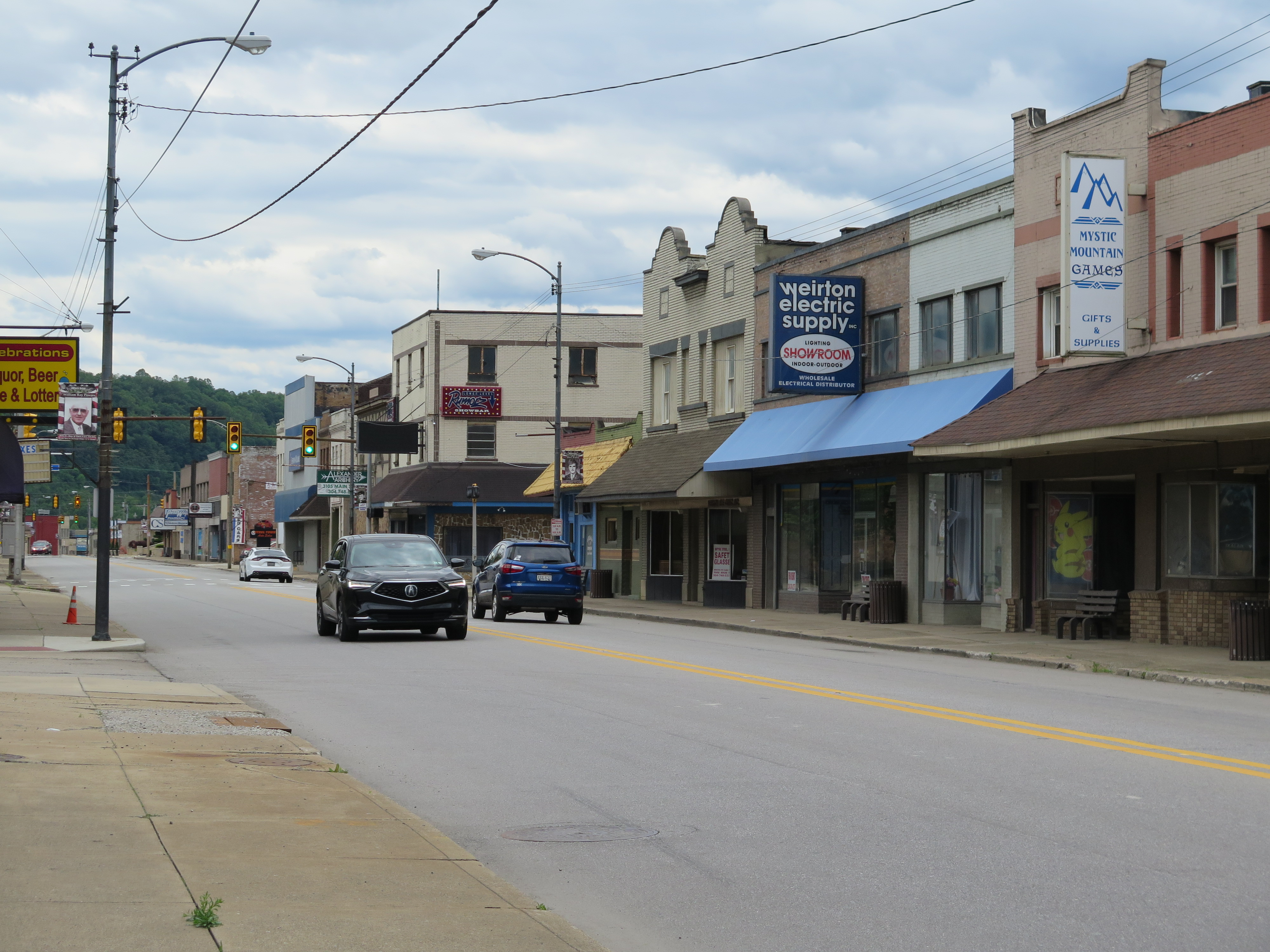
- Main Street in downtown Weirton

- Flag Seal
- Nickname: "Gateway To The Valley"
- Interactive map of Weirton, West Virginia
- Location within West Virginia Location within the United States
- Coordinates: 40°25′08″N 80°35′22″W
- Country: United States
- State: West Virginia
- Counties: Hancock, Brooke
- Settled: 1793
- Incorporated: July 1, 1947
- Named for: Ernest T. Weir

Government
  - Mayor: Dean M. Harris

Area
  - City: 19.27 sq mi (49.91 km^{2})
  - Land: 18.05 sq mi (46.76 km^{2})
  - Water: 1.22 sq mi (3.15 km^{2})
- Elevation: 750 ft (230 m)

Population (2020)
  - City: 19,163
  - Estimate (2021): 18,813
  - Density: 994.4/sq mi (383.95/km^{2})
  - Urban: 70,889 (US: 389th)
  - Metro: 116,903 (US: 334th)
- Time zone: UTC−5 (Eastern (EST))
  - Summer (DST): UTC−4 (EDT)
- ZIP code: 26062
- Area code: 304
- FIPS code: 54-85156
- GNIS feature ID: 1555932
- Website: Official website

Weirton (/ˈwɪərtən/ WEER-tən) is a city in Hancock and Brooke counties in the U.S. state of West Virginia. It is located along the Ohio River in the state's northern panhandle bordering Ohio and Pennsylvania. The population was 19,163 at the 2020 census, making it the seventh-most populous city in West Virginia.

Weirton was incorporated in 1947 after the consolidation of various small towns in the vicinity of the Weirton Steel Corporation, founded by Ernest T. Weir in 1909. It is a principal city of the Weirton–Steubenville metropolitan area, which had a population of 116,903 residents in 2020; it is also a major city in the western part of the Pittsburgh–New Castle–Weirton combined statistical area.

== History ==
Weirton's history dates to Fort Holliday, an American Revolutionary War fortification constructed in 1776 by soldiers from Fort Pitt. It was located in what is now downtown Weirton along Harmons Creek (named for Harmon Greathouse), about 3 miles (4.8 km) from its mouth on the Ohio River. It was commanded by Colonel Andrew Van Swearingen (1741–1793) and later by his son-in-law, Captain Samuel Brady (1756–1795). Van Swearingen led a dozen soldiers by longboat down the Ohio to help rescue the inhabitants of Fort Henry in Wheeling in a siege by the British and Indian tribes in 1777, which was memorialized in a mural at the Cove Station Post Office in Weirton. In 1779, over 28 militia were garrisoned at Fort Holliday.

A small village called Hollidays Cove, now most of downtown Weirton, was founded on the site in 1793. In 1909, Ernest T. Weir arrived from neighboring Pittsburgh and built a steel mill, later known as the Weirton Steel Corporation, just north of Hollidays Cove. An unincorporated settlement called Weirton grew around the mill that, by 1940, was said to be the largest unincorporated area in the United States. Weirton was featured in a photo essay titled Weir's Weirton in the September 13, 1937, issue of Life, whose cover displayed a portrait of Ernest T. Weir.

By the 1940s, Hollidays Cove and two other outlying areas, Marland Heights and Weirton Heights, had also incorporated. On July 1, 1947, the incorporated towns of Hollidays Cove, Marland Heights, and Weirton Heights merged with the remaining unincorporated area and formed the city of Weirton. Thomas E. Millsop, the head of the Weirton Steel division of National Steel Corporation, was elected as the city's first mayor. The city charter was approved by voters in 1950.

Weirton was one of several Ohio Valley towns that served as film locations for the acclaimed 1978 film, The Deer Hunter. Six years later it served as the primary location for filming of Reckless. The 2011 movie Super 8 was filmed in downtown Weirton, as well as many other places throughout the town, in the fall of 2010.

In 2011, the city and its two counties had attracted the attention of The New York Times which noted the town was dwindling in population. The article reported that Brooke County had just 71 live births for every 100 deaths and that Hancock County was in similar straits. This has led, the article claimed, to a reduction in civic institutions.

Weirton is home to a number of sites on the National Register of Historic Places, including the Johnston-Truax House, Marland Heights Park and Margaret Manson Weir Memorial Pool, People's Bank, Dr. George Rigas House, and the Peter Tarr Furnace Site.

== Geography ==
Veterans Memorial Bridge carries U.S. Route 22 across the Ohio River to Steubenville, Ohio.

Weirton is located at 40°25′08″N 80°35′22″W (40.4189, −80.5894). According to the United States Census Bureau, the city has a total area of 19.26 sq mi (49.88 km^{2}), of which 18.05 sq mi (46.75 km^{2}) is land and 1.21 sq mi (3.13 km^{2}) is water. It extends from the Ohio border on the west to the Pennsylvania border on the east at a point where the northern extension of West Virginia is 5 miles (8.0 km) across. While most of the city is in Hancock County, a small section of the city is in Brooke County.

Weirton is along the Ohio River across from Steubenville, Ohio, and is connected to the city by the Veterans Memorial Bridge. Via U.S. Route 22, it is about 35 miles (56 km) west of Pittsburgh, and Pittsburgh International Airport is about 20 miles (32 km) away via Pennsylvania Route 576. Weirton has three land borders: the cities of Follansbee to the south and New Cumberland to the north, and Hanover Township, Washington County, Pennsylvania to the east.

=== Climate ===
Weirton has a humid continental climate (Köppen climate classification: Dfa), with warm summers and chilly to cold winters.

Climate data for Weirton, West Virginia
Month	Jan	Feb	Mar	Apr	May	Jun	Jul	Aug	Sep	Oct	Nov	Dec	Year
Record high °F (°C)	75 (24)	77 (25)	84 (29)	89 (32)	93 (34)	98 (37)	102 (39)	100 (38)	101 (38)	91 (33)	85 (29)	77 (25)	102 (39)
Mean daily maximum °F (°C)	36 (2)	40 (4)	51 (11)	62 (17)	72 (22)	80 (27)	83 (28)	82 (28)	75 (24)	64 (18)	52 (11)	41 (5)	62 (16)
Mean daily minimum °F (°C)	20 (−7)	23 (−5)	30 (−1)	39 (4)	49 (9)	58 (14)	63 (17)	62 (17)	55 (13)	43 (6)	34 (1)	25 (−4)	42 (5)
Record low °F (°C)	−22 (−30)	−8 (−22)	−1 (−18)	15 (−9)	24 (−4)	34 (1)	43 (6)	40 (4)	33 (1)	19 (−7)	−1 (−18)	−14 (−26)	−22 (−30)
Average precipitation inches (mm)	2.85 (72)	2.46 (62)	3.29 (84)	3.20 (81)	4.11 (104)	4.37 (111)	4.26 (108)	3.84 (98)	3.26 (83)	2.53 (64)	3.38 (86)	3.00 (76)	40.55 (1,029)
Source: weather.com

== Demographics ==
Historical population
Census	Pop.	Note	%±
1950	24,005		—
1960	28,201		17.5%
1970	27,131		−3.8%
1980	24,736		−8.8%
1990	22,124		−10.6%
2000	20,411		−7.7%
2010	19,746		−3.3%
2020	19,163		−3.0%
2021 (est.)	18,813		−1.8%
U.S. Decennial Census; 2018 Estimate

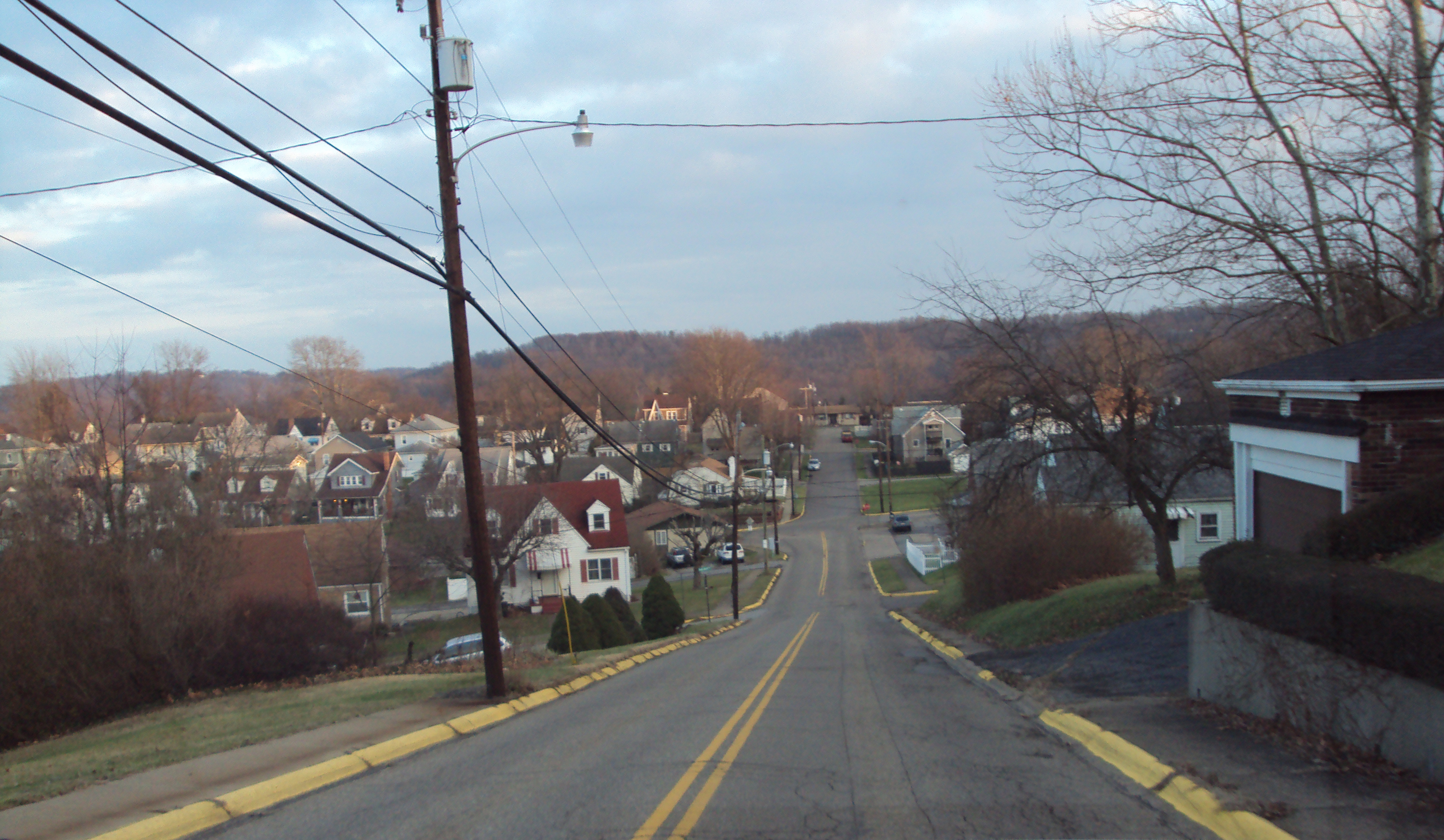
Weirton's Marland Heights neighborhood

=== 2020 census ===
As of the 2020 census, Weirton had a population of 19,163. The median age was 46.4 years. 18.6% of residents were under the age of 18 and 23.9% of residents were 65 years of age or older. For every 100 females there were 92.5 males, and for every 100 females age 18 and over there were 89.4 males age 18 and over.

96.9% of residents lived in urban areas, while 3.1% lived in rural areas.

There were 8,673 households in Weirton, of which 23.7% had children under the age of 18 living in them. Of all households, 40.1% were married-couple households, 20.8% were households with a male householder and no spouse or partner present, and 31.2% were households with a female householder and no spouse or partner present. About 35.4% of all households were made up of individuals and 17.0% had someone living alone who was 65 years of age or older.

There were 9,515 housing units, of which 8.8% were vacant. The homeowner vacancy rate was 2.1% and the rental vacancy rate was 7.4%.

Racial composition as of the 2020 census
Race	Number	Percent
White	17,143	89.5%
Black or African American	747	3.9%
American Indian and Alaska Native	27	0.1%
Asian	109	0.6%
Native Hawaiian and Other Pacific Islander	3	0.0%
Some other race	86	0.4%
Two or more races	1,048	5.5%
Hispanic or Latino (of any race)	318	1.7%

=== 2010 census ===
As of the census of 2010, there were 19,746 people, 8,839 households, and 5,507 families living in the city. The population density was 1,094.0/sq mi (422.4/km^{2}). There were 9,645 housing units at an average density of 534.3/sq mi (206.3/km^{2}). The racial makeup of the city was 93.7% White, 3.9% African American, 0.1% Native American, 0.5% Asian, 0.2% from other races, and 1.6% from two or more races. Hispanic or Latino of any race were 1.0% of the population.

There were 8,839 households, of which 24.8% had children under the age of 18 living with them, 44.8% were married couples living together, 13.0% had a female householder with no husband present, 4.5% had a male householder with no wife present, and 37.7% were non-families. 32.9% of all households were made up of individuals, and 15.1% had someone living alone who was 65 years of age or older. The average household size was 2.22 and the average family size was 2.78.

The median age in the city was 46 years. 19.4% of residents were under the age of 18; 6.3% were between the ages of 18 and 24; 23% were from 25 to 44; 30.8% were from 45 to 64; and 20.6% were 65 years of age or older. The gender makeup of the city was 47.3% male and 52.7% female.

=== 2000 census ===
As of the census of 2000, there were 20,411 people, 8,958 households, and 5,885 families living in the city. The population density was 1,142.2 people per square mile (441.0/km^{2}). There were 9,546 housing units at an average density of 534.2 per square mile (206.3/km^{2}). The racial makeup of the city was 94.52% White, 3.86% African American, 0.11% Native American, 0.59% Asian, 0.01% Pacific Islander, 0.14% from other races, and 0.77% from two or more races. Hispanic or Latino of any race were 0.68% of the population.

There were 8,958 households, out of which 23.8% had children under the age of 18 living with them, 51.4% were married couples living together, 10.6% had a female householder with no husband present, and 34.3% were non-families. 30.8% of all households were made up of individuals, and 15.9% had someone living alone who was 65 years of age or older. The average household size was 2.25 and the average family size was 2.79.

In the city, the population was spread out, with 19.2% under the age of 18, 6.6% from 18 to 24, 26.5% from 25 to 44, 25.4% from 45 to 64, and 22.3% who were 65 years of age or older. The median age was 44 years. For every 100 females, there were 88.6 males. For every 100 females age 18 and over, there were 85.6 males.

The median income for a household in the city was $35,212, and the median income for a family was $42,466. Males had a median income of $37,129 versus $19,745 for females. The per capita income for the city was $18,853. About 8.0% of families and 10.3% of the population were below the poverty line, including 14.0% of those under age 18 and 7.9% of those age 65 or over.

== Economy ==
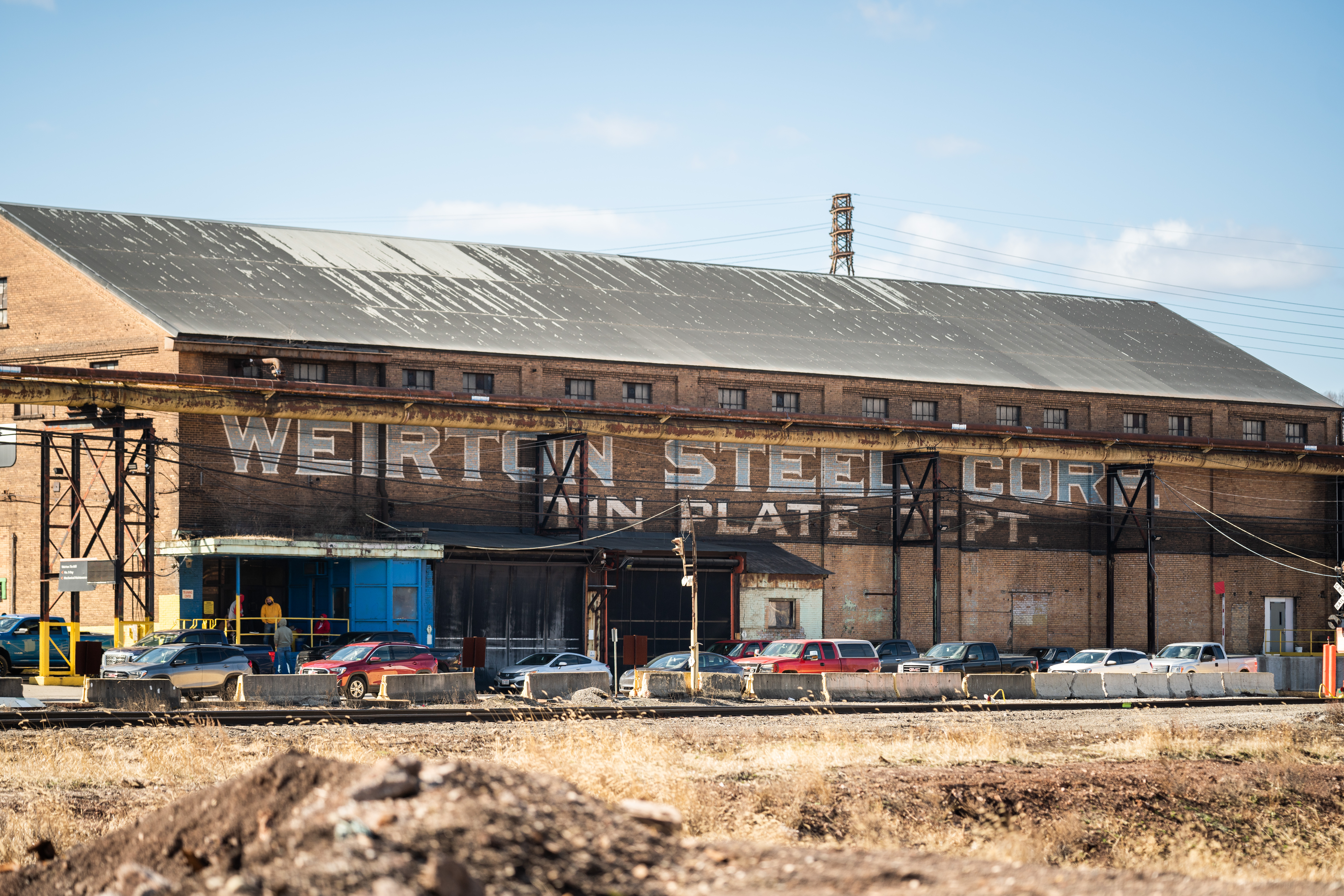
Former Weirton Steel building

The Weirton Steel Corporation was once a fully integrated steel mill employing over 12,000 people. At one point, it was the largest private employer and the largest taxpayer in West Virginia. Due to the reorganization of the steel industry, not only within the United States but worldwide, the Weirton mill faced declines in production. During the early 1980s, the employees of Weirton Steel endeavored to purchase the mill from National Steel Corporation as the largest Employee Stock Ownership Program in the nation, saving the mill from bankruptcy.

However, by 2003, the corporation was forced to file for bankruptcy after generating more than $700 million in losses since 1998. In 2004, International Steel Group acquired the 3,000-worker plant before merging with international giant ArcelorMittal. By 2016, only the tin-plating section of the mill, though still one of the country's largest tin-plate makers, was in operation with only 800 workers. In 2020, Ohio-based Cleveland-Cliffs purchased the tin mill. In February 2024, Cleveland-Cliffs announced the permanent closure of the mill and layoff of its remaining 800 workers.

In May 2023, Form Energy began construction at the Weirton mill site for a manufacturing facility producing iron-air batteries for electrical storage.

Outside of industry and manufacturing, one of the city's largest employers is Weirton Medical Center, part of the West Virginia University Health System. It is a 238-bed hospital that serves patients from all over the region and employs over 1,400 people.

== Government ==
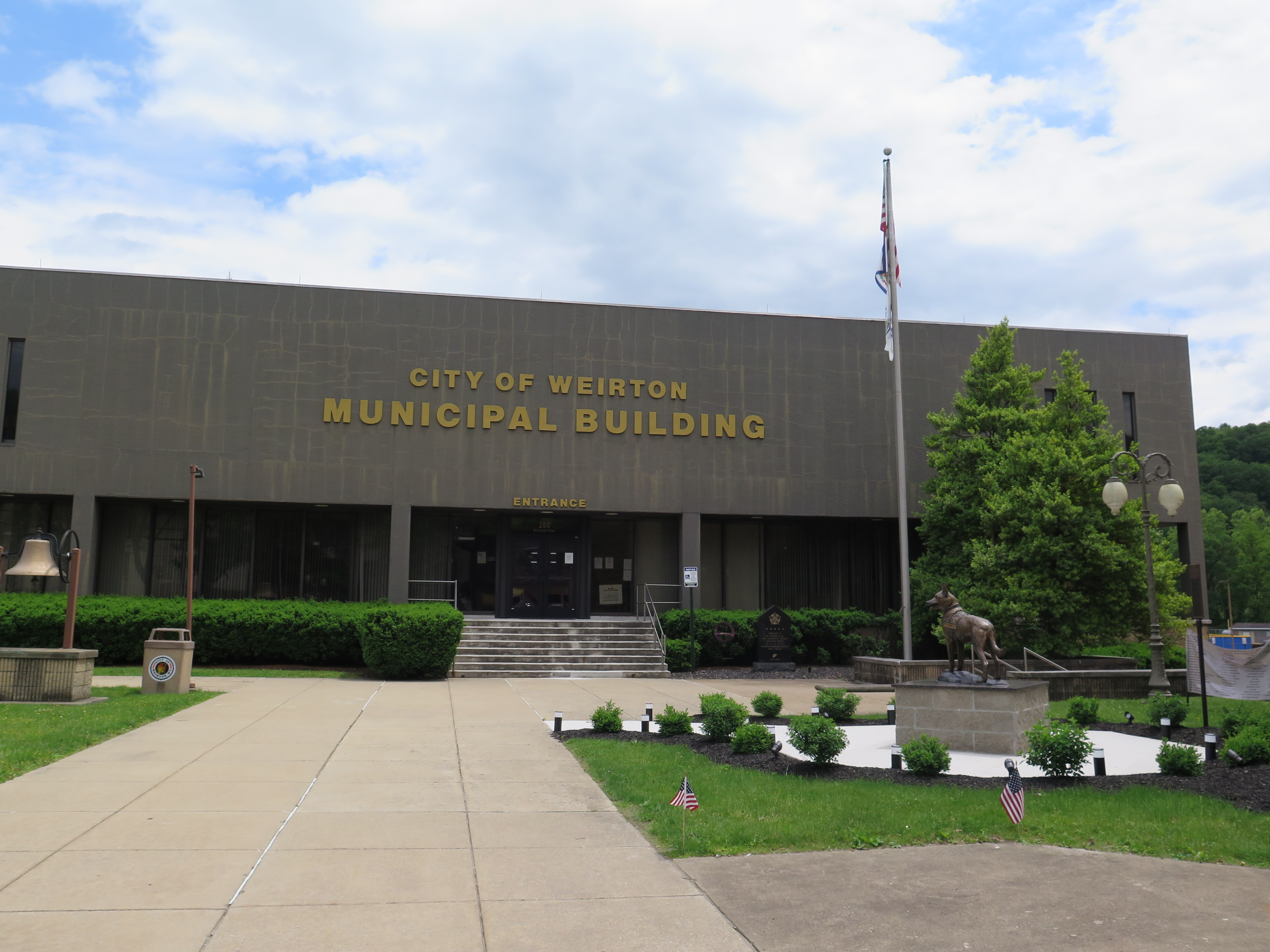
Weirton Municipal Building

=== Police ===
There have been three fatal shootings by police officers in the history of the Weirton department. The third, in 2016, was a case of suicide by cop. The first officer on the scene recognized the situation, determined that the situation posed no immediate threat, and started talking to the distressed citizen, who was holding an unloaded gun and telling the officer to "Just shoot me". An officer who arrived subsequently shot the man dead on his fourth attempt, less than 10 seconds after arriving on the scene.

The police department fired the first officer for not killing the man first. The police chief said in sworn testimony that although he had fired the officer for not shooting the man soon enough, the department's policy prohibits officers from shooting people whom they believe do not pose a threat. Shortly after this admission that the officer was fired for correctly following the department policy on the legitimate use of force, the city settled a lawsuit for wrongful termination.

== Education ==
Children in Weirton are served by either the Hancock County Schools or the Brooke County Schools, depending on their jurisdiction of residence. Within the city limits, Hancock County Schools operates one elementary school, one middle school, and Weir High School. Students who reside in the Brooke County portion of Weirton attend schools outside the city limits, including Brooke High School. Private school options include Weirton Madonna High School.

== Notable people ==
- James J. Andrews, Union spy during the Civil War
- Jerry Bird, skydiver
- Bob Gain, football player for the Cleveland Browns; 1950 Outland Trophy winner
- Jerry A. Hausman, noted economist at MIT and developer of the Hausman specification test
- Bob Jeter, football player for the Green Bay Packers and Chicago Bears; three-time NFL champion
- Gary Jeter, football player for the New York Giants, Los Angeles Rams and New England Patriots
- Kevin Miller, football player for the Minnesota Vikings and Birmingham Stallions
- Ken Reed, member of the West Virginia House of Delegates
- Mike Rodak, football player for the Cleveland Rams, Detroit Lions, and Pittsburgh Steelers
- Karen Staley, singer-songwriter
- Ernest T. Weir, founder of the National Steel Corporation
- Ronald Robert Williams, basketball player for West Virginia University, San Francisco Warriors, Milwaukee Bucks, and Los Angeles Lakers.
- Quincy Wilson, football player for West Virginia University and the Cincinnati Bengals

== See also ==
- List of cities and towns along the Ohio River
- Veterans Memorial Bridge
- Market Street Bridge (Steubenville)
- National Register of Historic Places listings in Hancock County, West Virginia
- Dunbar Recreation Center
