= Weirton–Steubenville metropolitan area =

Coordinates: 40°25′N 80°35′W

Upper Ohio Valley
- Metropolitan Statistical Area
- Weirton–Steubenville, WV–OH; Metropolitan Statistical Area
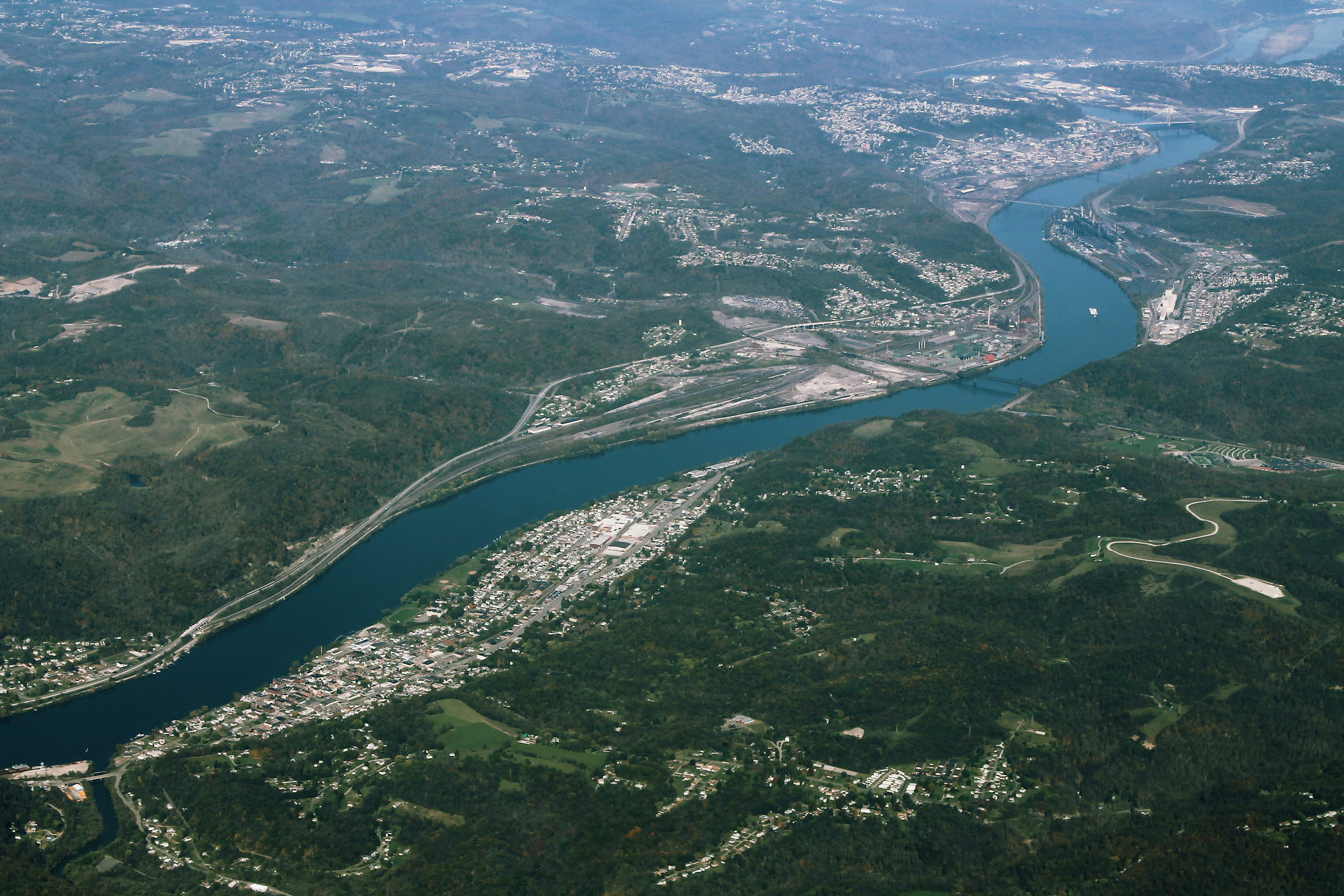
- An aerial view of the central part of the MSA
Weirton–Steubenville, OH–WV MSA
City of Weirton
City of Steubenville
Weirton–Steubenville, OH–WV MSA
Other counties in the Pittsburgh CSA
- Country: United States
- State: Ohio; West Virginia
- Largest city: Weirton
- Other cities: Steubenville; Toronto; Wintersville; Mingo Junction

Area
  - Total: 1,715 sq mi (4,440 km^{2})

Population
  - Total: 116,903
  - Rank: 334th in the U.S.
  - Density: 480/sq mi (185/km^{2})
- Time zone: UTC−5 (EST)
  - Summer (DST): UTC−4 (EDT)

The Weirton–Steubenville, WV–OH Metropolitan Statistical Area, also known as the Upper Ohio Valley, is a metropolitan statistical area consisting of two counties in the Northern Panhandle of West Virginia and one in Ohio, anchored by the cities of Weirton and Steubenville. As of the 2020 census, the MSA had a population of 116,903. This puts it at 334th largest in the United States. It is also included in the larger Pittsburgh–New Castle–Weirton, PA–OH–WV Combined Statistical Area.

Centered around the Ohio River, the Upper Ohio Valley was historically a manufacturing center of the United States due to its strategic transportation location.

== Demographics ==
Historical population
Census	Pop.	Note	%±
1950	157,787		—
1960	167,756		6.3%
1970	165,627		−1.3%
1980	163,099		−1.5%
1990	142,523		−12.6%
2000	132,008		−7.4%
2010	124,454		−5.7%
2020	116,903		−6.1%
U.S. Decennial Census

As of the census of 2000, there were 132,008 people, 54,491 households, and 37,250 families residing within the MSA. The racial makeup of the MSA was 94.50% White, 3.91% African American, 0.16% Native American, 0.34% Asian, 0.02% Pacific Islander, 0.19% from other races, and 0.88% from two or more races. Hispanic or Latino people of any race were 0.61% of the population.

The median income for a household in the MSA was $32,531, and the median income for a family was $39,825. Males had a median income of $34,998 versus $19,729 for females. The per capita income for the MSA was $17,110.

== Counties ==
- Brooke County, West Virginia
- Hancock County, West Virginia
- Jefferson County, Ohio

== Communities ==
Income of the Pittsburgh CSA; the Upper Ohio Valley makes up the counties and municipalities in the far west.

Places with more than 15,000 inhabitants

- Steubenville, Ohio (principal city)
- Weirton, West Virginia (principal city)

Places with 1,000 to 10,000 inhabitants

- Chester, West Virginia
- Follansbee, West Virginia
- Hooverson Heights, West Virginia
- Mingo Junction, Ohio
- New Cumberland, West Virginia
- Newell, West Virginia
- Tiltonsville, Ohio
- Toronto, Ohio
- Wellsburg, West Virginia
- Wintersville, Ohio
- Yorkville, Ohio (partial)

Places with 500 to 1,000 inhabitants

- Adena, Ohio (partial)
- Amsterdam, Ohio
- Beech Bottom, West Virginia
- Bergholz, Ohio
- Bethany, West Virginia
- Dillonvale, Ohio
- Mount Pleasant, Ohio
- Smithfield, Ohio

Places with fewer than 500 inhabitants

- Bloomingdale, Ohio
- Empire, Ohio
- Irondale, Ohio
- New Alexandria, Ohio
- Rayland, Ohio
- Richmond, Ohio
- Stratton, Ohio
- Windsor Heights, West Virginia

Unincorporated places

- Arnold, West Virginia
- Brilliant, Ohio
- Coketown, West Virginia
- Colliers, West Virginia
- Congo, West Virginia
- East Springfield, Ohio
- East Steubenville, West Virginia
- Fairhaven, West Virginia
- Fowlerston, West Virginia
- Greentown, Ohio
- Hammondsville, Ohio
- Hopewell, Ohio
- Kings Creek, West Virginia
- Lawrenceville, West Virginia
- Lennyville, West Virginia
- Moscow, West Virginia
- New Manchester, West Virginia
- New Somerset, Ohio
- Piney Fork, Ohio
- Rockdale, West Virginia
- Short Creek, West Virginia
- Sun Valley, West Virginia
- Weems, Ohio
- Wolf Run, Ohio

Townships (Jefferson County, Ohio)

- Brush Creek
- Cross Creek
- Island Creek
- Knox
- Mount Pleasant
- Ross
- Salem
- Saline
- Smithfield
- Springfield
- Steubenville
- Warren
- Wayne
- Wells

== See also ==
- Greater Pittsburgh Region
- West Virginia census statistical areas
- Ohio census statistical areas
