= Virginville =

Virginville may refer to:

- Virginville, Pennsylvania, an unincorporated community in Richmond Township, Berks County, Pennsylvania, United States
- Virginville, West Virginia, an unincorporated community in Brooke County, West Virginia, United States
