= Arnold, West Virginia =

Arnold is the name of several unincorporated communities in the U.S. state of West Virginia.

- Arnold, Brooke County, West Virginia
