= Yellow Creek Township, Columbiana County, Ohio =

Township in Ohio, US

- Township
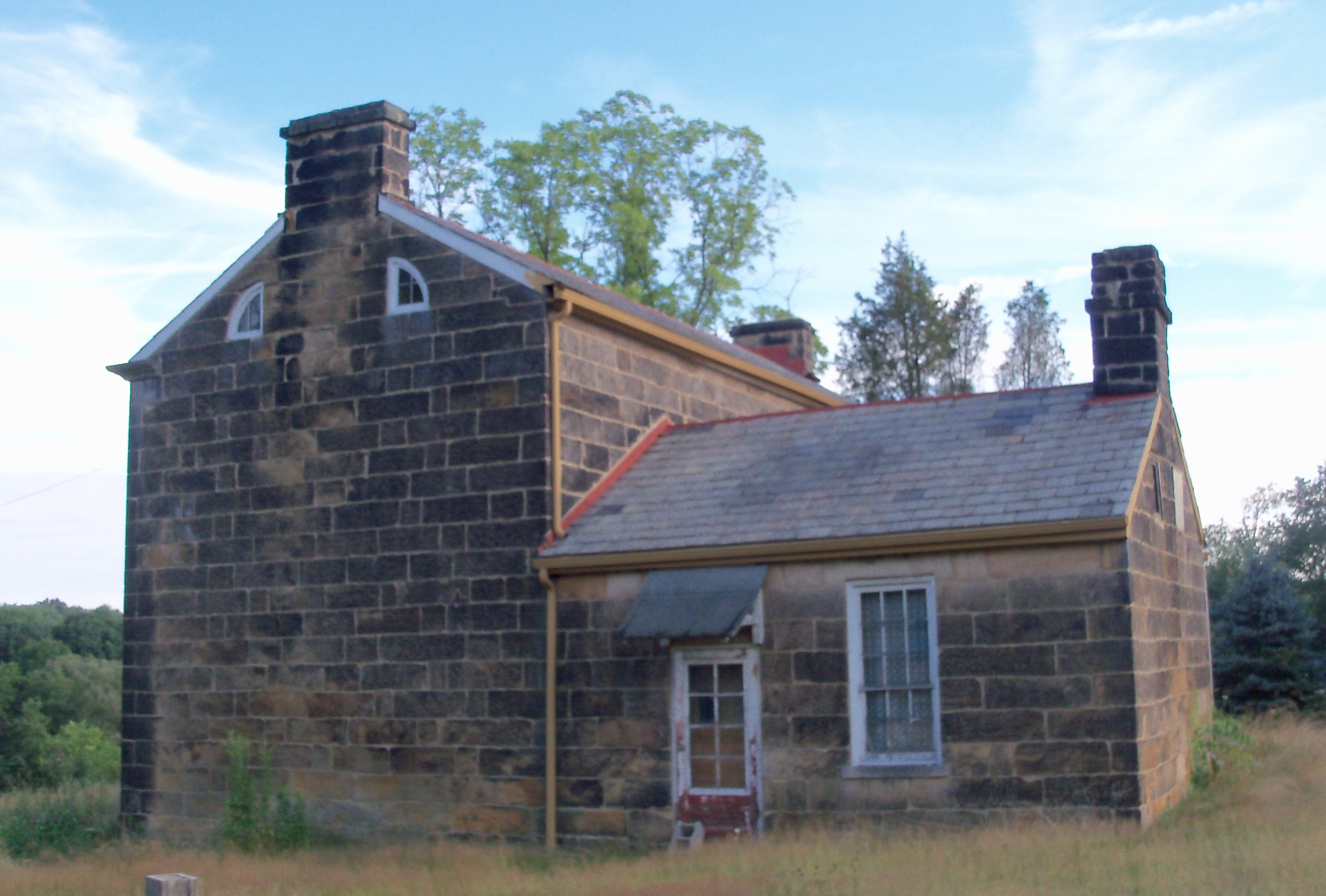
- The Daniel McBean Farmhouse, built 1846

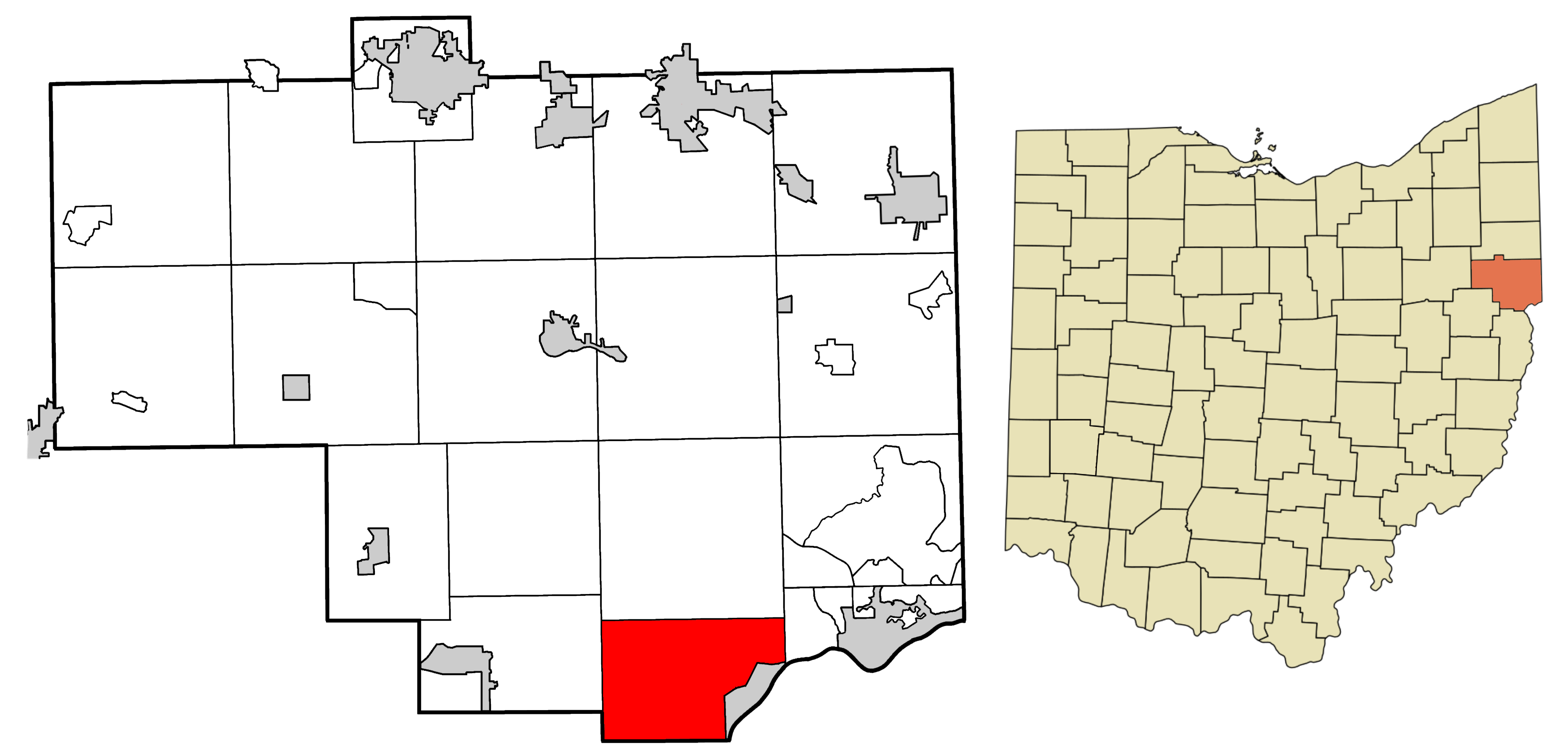
- Location of Yellow Creek Township in Columbiana County
- Coordinates: 40°37′8″N 80°41′46″W
- Country: United States
- State: Ohio
- County: Columbiana

Area
  - Total: 19.8 sq mi (51.2 km^{2})
  - Land: 19.7 sq mi (51.1 km^{2})
  - Water: 0.039 sq mi (0.1 km^{2})
- Elevation: 856 ft (261 m)

Population (2020)
  - Total: 1,973
  - Density: 100/sq mi (38.6/km^{2})
- Time zone: UTC-5 (Eastern (EST))
  - Summer (DST): UTC-4 (EDT)
- FIPS code: 39-86912
- GNIS feature ID: 1085908

Yellow Creek Township is one of the eighteen townships of Columbiana County, Ohio, United States. At the 2020 census the population was 1,973.

== Geography ==
Located in the southeastern part of the county along the Ohio River, it borders the following townships:

- Madison Township - north
- Liverpool Township - northeast
- Hancock County, West Virginia - southeast, across the Ohio River
- Saline Township, Jefferson County - south
- Brush Creek Township, Jefferson County - southwest
- Washington Township - west

It is the most southerly township in Columbiana County.

One village is located in Yellow Creek Township:

- The village of Wellsville, in the southeast

== Name and history ==
Historical population
Census	Pop.	Note	%±
1980	2,458		—
1990	2,208		−10.2%
2000	2,185		−1.0%
2010	2,140		−2.1%
2020	1,973		−7.8%

The township was organized in 1806. It is the only Yellow Creek Township in Ohio.

== Government ==
The township is governed by a three-member board of trustees who are elected in November of odd-numbered years to a four-year term beginning on the following January 1. Two are elected in the year after the presidential election and one is elected in the year before it. There is also an elected township fiscal officer, who serves a four-year term beginning on April 1 of the year after the election, which is held in November of the year before the presidential election. Vacancies in the fiscal officership or on the board of trustees are filled by the remaining trustees.

Township trustees

- Noah C. Allison, chairman
- Mark Allison, vice chairman
- Kenny Biacco

Fiscal officer

- Deborah A. Lyle
