= Coketown =

Coketown may refer to:

- Coketown, West Virginia
- Coketown, the fictional city in the novel Hard Times, by Charles Dickens
