= East Springfield =

East Springfield may refer to the following places:

- East Springfield, Ohio
- East Springfield, Pennsylvania
- East Springfield, Springfield, Massachusetts
