= Hooverson Heights, West Virginia =

- Census-designated place (CDP)
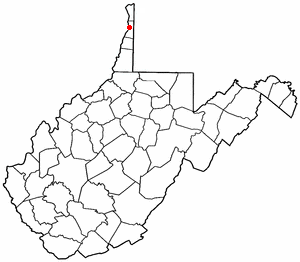
- Location of Hooverson Heights, West Virginia
- Coordinates: 40°19′22″N 80°34′57″W
- Country: United States
- State: West Virginia
- County: Brooke

Area
  - Total: 2.3 sq mi (6.0 km^{2})
  - Land: 2.2 sq mi (5.8 km^{2})
  - Water: 0.039 sq mi (0.1 km^{2})
- Elevation: 1,020 ft (311 m)

Population (2020)
  - Total: 2,582
  - Density: 1,200/sq mi (450/km^{2})
- Time zone: UTC-5 (Eastern (EST))
  - Summer (DST): UTC-4 (EDT)
- Area code: 304
- FIPS code: 54-38476
- GNIS feature ID: 1554738

Hooverson Heights is a census-designated place (CDP) in Brooke County, West Virginia, United States. It is part of the Weirton–Steubenville metropolitan area. The population was 2,582 at the 2020 census (slightly down from 2,590 at the 2010 census).

== Geography ==
Hooverson Heights is located at 40°19′22″N 80°34′57″W (40.322685, -80.582438). It is a suburban area near the town of Follansbee, in Brooke County.

According to the United States Census Bureau, the CDP has a total area of 2.3 square miles (6.0 km^{2}), of which 2.3 square miles (6.0 km^{2}) is land and 0.1 square miles (0.26 km^{2}) (2.94%) is water.

== Demographics ==
As of the census of 2000, there were 2,909 people, 1,144 households, and 814 families residing in the CDP. The population density was 486.2 people/km^{2} (1,259 people/mi^{2}). There were 1,206 housing units at an average density of 201.6 units/km^{2} (522 units/mi^{2}). The racial makeup of the CDP was 98.90% White, 0.28% African American, 0.03% Native American, 0.17% Asian, 0.00% Pacific Islander, 0.00% from other races, and 0.62% from two or more races. Hispanic or Latino of any race were 0.41% of the population.

There were 1,144 households, out of which 28.8% had children under the age of 18 living with them, 57.0% were married couples living together, 9.9% had a female householder with no husband present, and 28.8% were non-families. 25.6% of all households were made up of individuals, and 12.6% had someone living alone who was 65 years of age or older. The average household size was 2.41 and the average family size was 2.87.

In the CDP the population was spread out, with 20.9% under the age of 18, 7.2% from 18 to 24, 26.6% from 25 to 44, 26.1% from 45 to 64, and 19.2% who were 65 years of age or older. The median age was 42 years. For every 100 females there were 84.7 males. For every 100 females age 18 and over, there were 82.3 males.

The median income for a household in the CDP was $37,101, and the median income for a family was $41,399. Males had a median income of $32,218 versus $20,250 for females. The per capita income for the CDP was $16,662. About 8.6% of families and 11.7% of the population were below the poverty line, including 13.8% of those under age 18 and 3.1% of those age 65 or over.
