= Island Creek Township, Jefferson County, Ohio =

Township in Ohio, US

- Township
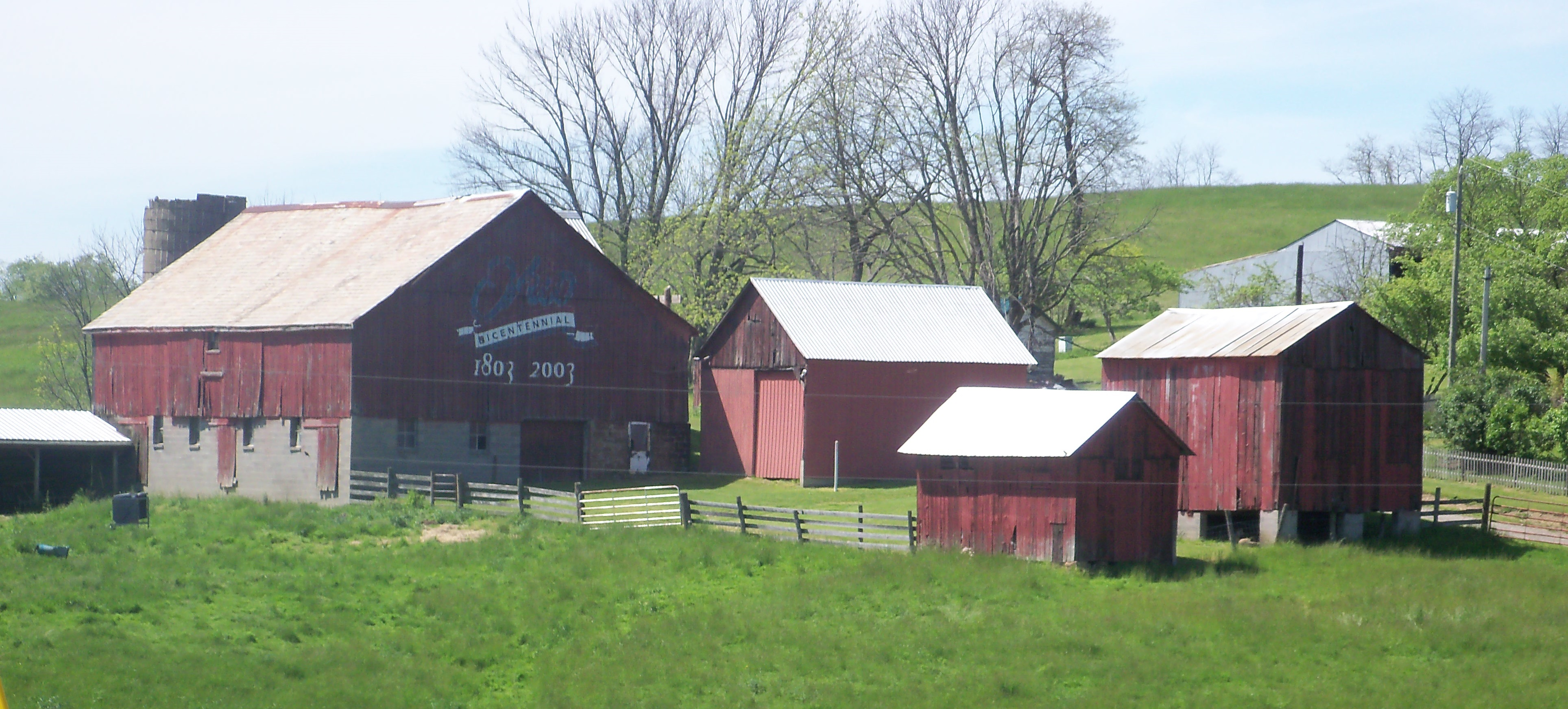
- Jefferson County's Bicentennial Barn is on Route 213

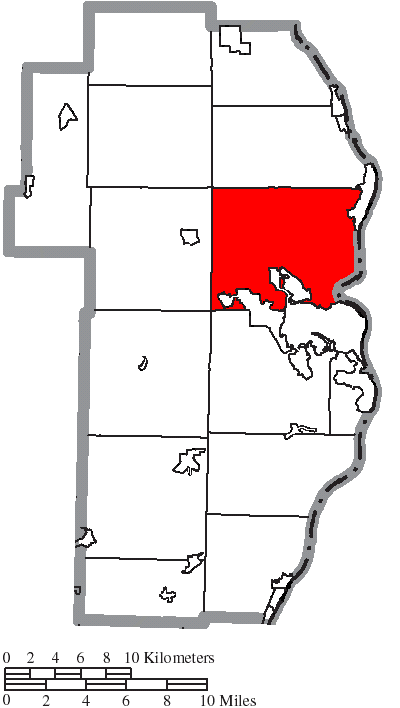
- Location of Island Creek Township in Jefferson County
- Coordinates: 40°26′1″N 80°38′55″W
- Country: United States
- State: Ohio
- County: Jefferson

Area
  - Total: 41.3 sq mi (106.9 km^{2})
  - Land: 41.2 sq mi (106.8 km^{2})
  - Water: 0.039 sq mi (0.1 km^{2})
- Elevation: 1,250 ft (381 m)

Population (2020)
  - Total: 10,173
  - Density: 246.7/sq mi (95.25/km^{2})
- Time zone: UTC-5 (Eastern (EST))
  - Summer (DST): UTC-4 (EDT)
- Postal code: 44444
- FIPS code: 39-37534
- GNIS feature ID: 1086378
- Website: https://www.islandcreektwp.com/

Island Creek Township is one of the fourteen townships of Jefferson County, Ohio, United States. The 2020 census found 10,173 people in the township.

== Geography ==
Located in the eastern part of the county along the Ohio River, it borders the following townships and city:

- Knox Township - north
- Steubenville - southeast
- Cross Creek Township - south
- Wayne Township - southwest corner
- Salem Township - west
- Ross Township - northwest corner

West Virginia lies across the Ohio River to the east: Hancock County to the northeast, and Brooke County to the southeast.

Parts of southern Island Creek Township are occupied by the city of Steubenville, the county seat of Jefferson County. As well, two incorporated municipalities are located in the township: part of the city of Toronto along the Ohio River in the northeast, and part of the village of Wintersville in the southwest. The census-designated place of Pottery Addition lies in the southeast corner.

== Name and history ==
Island Creek Township was founded in 1806. It takes its name from the Island Creek, which runs through it.

It is the only Island Creek Township statewide.

== Government ==
The township is governed by a three-member board of trustees, who are elected in November of odd-numbered years to a four-year term beginning on the following January 1. Two are elected in the year after the presidential election and one is elected in the year before it. There is also an elected township fiscal officer, who serves a four-year term beginning on April 1 of the year after the election, which is held in November of the year before the presidential election. Vacancies in the fiscal officership or on the board of trustees are filled by the remaining trustees.
