= Virginville, West Virginia =

- Unincorporated community
- Location within West Virginia Location within the United States
- Coordinates: 40°17′34″N 80°31′25″W
- Country: United States
- State: West Virginia
- County: Brooke
- Elevation: 787 ft (240 m)
- Time zone: UTC-5 (Eastern (EST))
  - Summer (DST): UTC-4 (EDT)
- Area codes: 304 & 681
- GNIS feature ID: 1555896

Virginville is an unincorporated community in Brooke County, West Virginia, United States. Virginville is located near the Pennsylvania border, 4.5 miles (7.2 km) southeast of Follansbee.

A post office called Virginville was established in 1907, and remained in operation until 1973. The community's name is derived from "Virginia".
