= Richmond, Ohio =

- Village
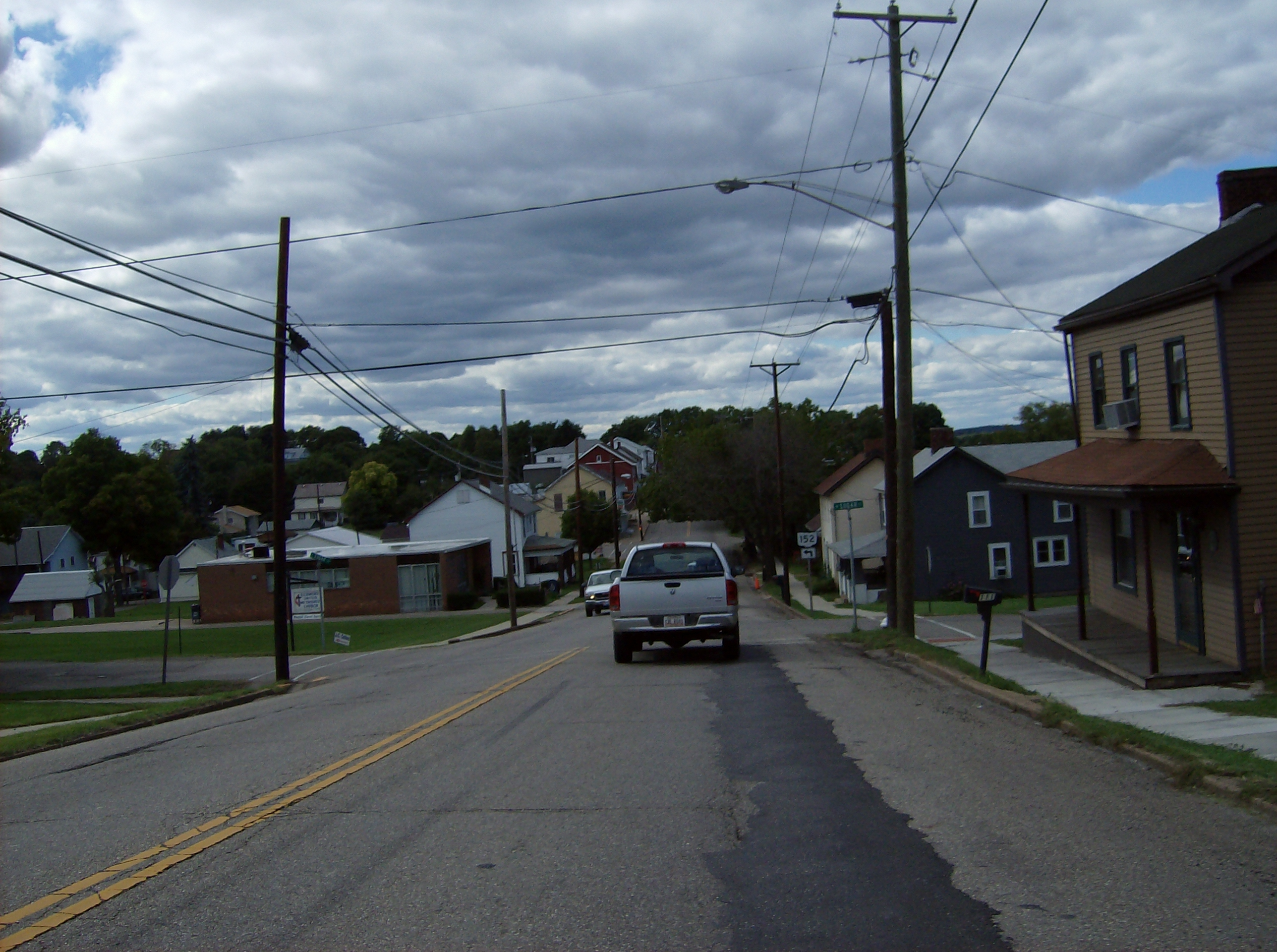
- Westward into Richmond on Ohio State Routes 43 and 152

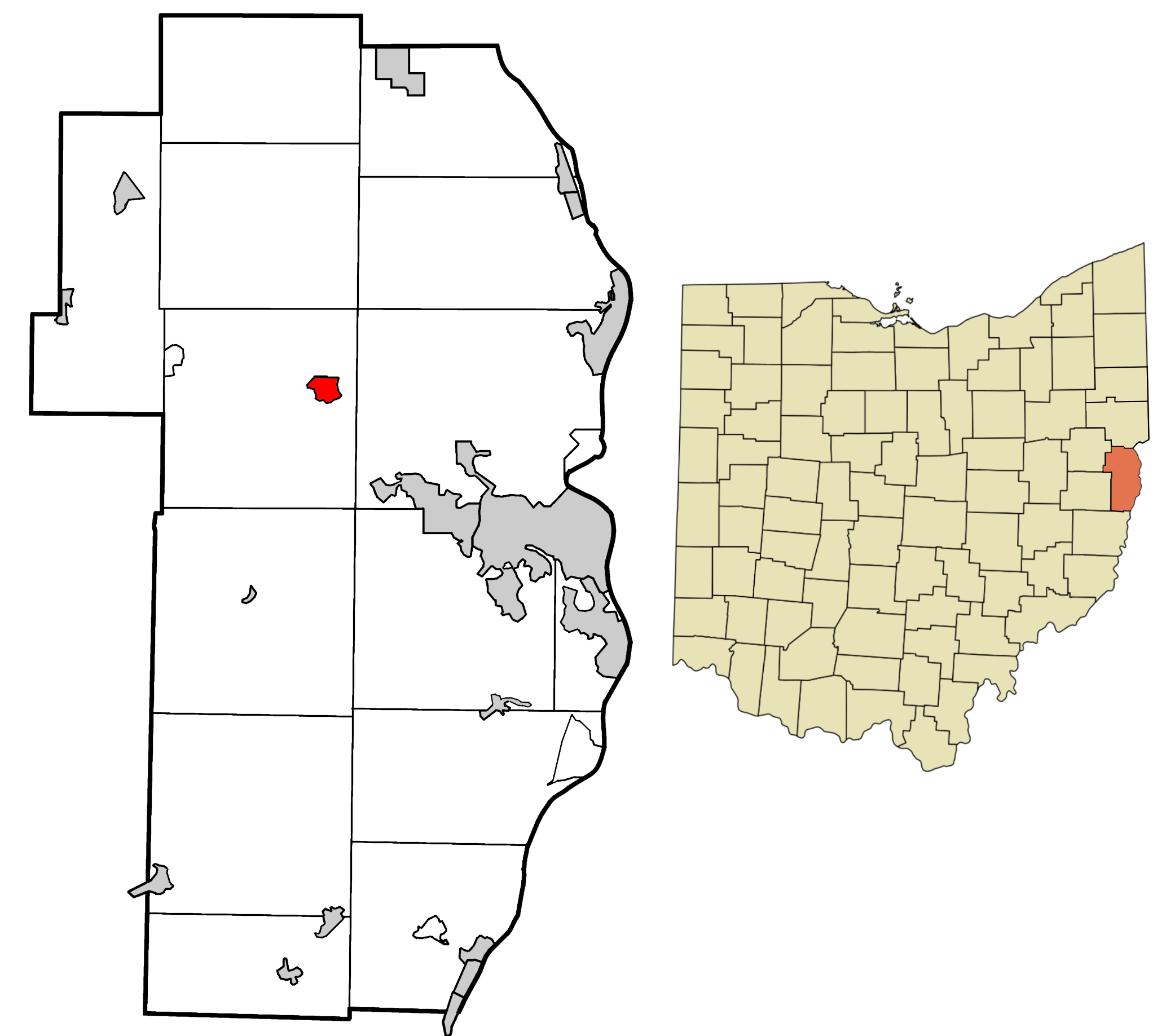
- Location of Richmond in Jefferson County, Ohio

- Location within Ohio Location within the United States
- Coordinates: 40°25′58″N 80°46′19″W
- Country: United States
- State: Ohio
- County: Jefferson
- Township: Salem

Area
  - Total: 0.55 sq mi (1.43 km^{2})
  - Land: 0.55 sq mi (1.43 km^{2})
  - Water: 0 sq mi (0.00 km^{2})
- Elevation: 1,243 ft (379 m)

Population (2020)
  - Total: 412
  - Density: 744.8/sq mi (287.56/km^{2})
- Time zone: UTC-5 (Eastern (EST))
  - Summer (DST): UTC-4 (EDT)
- ZIP code: 43944
- Area code: 740
- FIPS code: 39-66824
- GNIS feature ID: 2399066

Richmond is a village in Jefferson County, Ohio, United States. The population was 412 at the 2020 census. It is part of the Weirton–Steubenville metropolitan area.

== History ==
Richmond was laid out in 1815. A post office called Richmond has been in operation since 1817.

Confederate general John Hunt Morgan traveled through Richmond during the 1863 Morgan's Raid on his way to defeat at the Battle of Salineville in the American Civil War.

== Geography ==
According to the United States Census Bureau, the village has a total area of 0.55 square miles (1.42 km^{2}), all land.

== Demographics ==
Historical population
Census	Pop.	Note	%±
1830	231		—
1850	514		—
1860	692		34.6%
1870	405		−41.5%
1880	491		21.2%
1890	444		−9.6%
1900	332		−25.2%
1910	203		−38.9%
1920	358		76.4%
1930	388		8.4%
1940	458		18.0%
1950	579		26.4%
1960	728		25.7%
1970	777		6.7%
1980	624		−19.7%
1990	446		−28.5%
2000	471		5.6%
2010	481		2.1%
2020	412		−14.3%
U.S. Decennial Census

=== 2010 census ===
As of the census of 2010, there were 481 people, 213 households, and 136 families living in the village. The population density was 874.5 inhabitants per square mile (337.6/km^{2}). There were 245 housing units at an average density of 445.5 per square mile (172.0/km^{2}). The racial makeup of the village was 98.8% White, 0.6% African American, 0.4% Asian, and 0.2% from two or more races. Hispanic or Latino of any race were 0.8% of the population.

There were 213 households, of which 23.9% had children under the age of 18 living with them, 48.4% were married couples living together, 13.1% had a female householder with no husband present, 2.3% had a male householder with no wife present, and 36.2% were non-families. 31.0% of all households were made up of individuals, and 10.8% had someone living alone who was 65 years of age or older. The average household size was 2.26 and the average family size was 2.83.

The median age in the village was 43.8 years. 18.7% of residents were under the age of 18; 9.5% were between the ages of 18 and 24; 22.8% were from 25 to 44; 33.1% were from 45 to 64; and 16% were 65 years of age or older. The gender makeup of the village was 46.8% male and 53.2% female.

=== 2000 census ===
As of the census of 2000, there were 471 people, 196 households, and 147 families living in the village. The population density was 886.4 inhabitants per square mile (342.2/km^{2}). There were 221 housing units at an average density of 415.9 per square mile (160.6/km^{2}). The racial makeup of the village was 98.09% White, 0.21% African American, 1.06% Asian, and 0.64% from two or more races. Hispanic or Latino of any race were 0.21% of the population.

There were 196 households, out of which 27.6% had children under the age of 18 living with them, 59.7% were married couples living together, 10.7% had a female householder with no husband present, and 25.0% were non-families. 24.0% of all households were made up of individuals, and 12.8% had someone living alone who was 65 years of age or older. The average household size was 2.40 and the average family size was 2.82.

In the village, the population was spread out, with 20.6% under the age of 18, 5.5% from 18 to 24, 28.7% from 25 to 44, 25.3% from 45 to 64, and 20.0% who were 65 years of age or older. The median age was 42 years. For every 100 females there were 82.6 males. For every 100 females age 18 and over, there were 79.8 males.

The median income for a household in the village was $29,659, and the median income for a family was $35,500. Males had a median income of $32,969 versus $14,375 for females. The per capita income for the village was $13,764. About 9.5% of families and 11.0% of the population were below the poverty line, including 9.6% of those under age 18 and 6.8% of those age 65 or over.

== Education ==
Richmond is served by the Edison Local School District. Campuses serving the village include John Gregg Elementary School and Edison High School.

== Notable people ==
- William Milligan Sloane, educator and historian
