= Brooke High School =

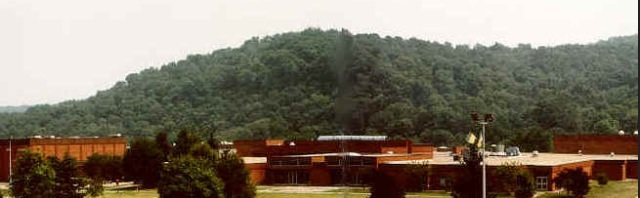

Location
- 29 Bruin Drive; Wellsburg, West Virginia 26070; United States; 40°18′13″N 80°35′09″W

Information
- Type: Public high school
- Established: 1969
- School district: Brooke County Schools
- Superintendent: Jeffrey R. Crook
- CEEB code: 491365
- Principal: Eric James
- Teaching staff: 66.00 (FTE)
- Grades: 9-12
- Student to teacher ratio: 14.65
- Campus type: Fringe rural
- Colors: Green and gold
- Fight song: "Green and Gold"
- Athletics conference: Ohio Valley Athletic Conference
- Mascot: The Bruin Bear
- Team name: Bruins
- Rival: Wheeling Park Patriots; Steubenville Big Red; Weir Red Riders
- Newspaper: The Babbling Brooke
- Yearbook: Crossroads
- Feeder schools: Brooke Middle School
- Website: www.brooke.k12.wv.us/o/bcs/page/brooke-high-school

Brooke High School is a public high school in Wellsburg, West Virginia, United States. It is the only high school in the Brooke County Schools. Athletic teams compete as the Brooke Bruins in the WVSSAC Class AAA as well as the Ohio Valley Athletic Conference.

== History ==
Brooke High School was established in 1969 from the consolidation of Follansbee High School, Wellsburg High School, and Bethany High School

== Athletics ==
=== Basketball ===
The Bruins have five basketball teams, both boys and girls. Boys play freshman, JV and varsity while girls compete in JV and varsity.

The boys' varsity basketball team won the WV AAA championship in 1987.

=== Cheerleading ===
The various varsity cheerleading squads have earned the school a record-setting 13 West Virginia state titles and 25 Region 1 championships. Brooke has also competed in the Ohio Valley Athletic Conference Cheerleading championship winning various titles – most recently in 2011.

=== Football ===
Brooke High School won the WV AAA championship in 1985, 1987, and 1990.

=== Marching Band ===
The Brooke High School Marching Band is currently under the direction of Johnny Leonard. In the summer of 2022, the band performed the school's fight song "Green and Gold" at Walt Disney World.

== Notable alumni ==
=== Joe Pettini ===
Pettini is a former Major League Baseball player who played for the San Francisco Giants and coached the St. Louis Cardinals and the Houston Astros.

=== Rich Thomaselli ===
Thomaselli is a former American football running back who played for the Houston Oilers of the National Football League (NFL). He played college football at West Virginia Wesleyan College and also played for the Montreal Alouettes of the Canadian Football League (CFL).
