= William Milligan Sloane =

American educator and historian (1850–1928)

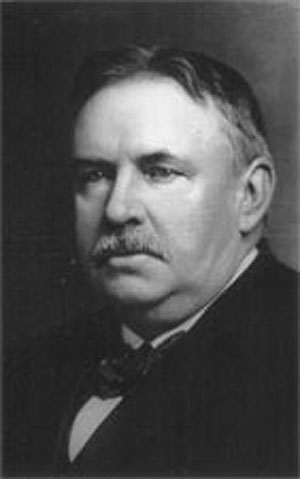
- Born: November 12, 1850; Richmond, Ohio
- Died: September 12, 1928 (aged 77); Bay Head, New Jersey
- Occupations: Educator and historian
- Spouse: Mary Espey Johnston (m. 1877)

William Milligan Sloane (November 12, 1850 – September 12, 1928) was an American educator and historian.

== Career ==
William Milligan Sloane was born in Richmond, Ohio on November 12, 1850. He graduated from Columbia College of Columbia University, where he was a member of the Philolexian Society, in 1868, and afterward was employed as instructor in classics at the Newell School in Pittsburgh until 1872. From 1872 to 1876 he studied at the universities of Berlin and Leipzig. He studied history under Mommsen and Droysen, and much of the time he worked as private secretary to George Bancroft, United States Minister at Berlin. He received a doctorate from the University of Leipzig, with a dissertation entitled The Poet Labid: His Life, Times, and Fragmentary Writings, which was published in 1877. The published version of Sloane's dissertation specifically mentions that he studied under Fleischer, Krehl, and Loth at Leipzig.

Sloane was a professor of Latin (1877–1883) and subsequently History (1883–1896) at Princeton University, when it was still known as the College of New Jersey. While there, he edited the Princeton Review (1885–1888). He resigned in 1896 to become Seth Low Professor of History at Columbia University.

Sloane served on the International Olympic Committee from 1894 to 1924. The founder and chairman of the United States Olympic Committee (known at the time as the American Olympic Committee), he escorted the first American Olympic team to 1896 Summer Olympics in Athens.

Professor Sloane was a member of the American Academy of Arts and Letters, and in 1911 president of the American Historical Association. His other honors were Chevalier of the French Legion of Honor and of the Order of the Polar Star.

He died at his home in Bay Head, New Jersey on September 11, 1928.

He was portrayed in the 1984 NBC mini-series The First Olympics: Athens 1896 by David Ogden Stiers.

== Personal life ==
Sloane married Mary Espey Johnston on December 27, 1877. They had a son, James Renwick Sloane, who married Isabel Hoyt Sloane. James and Isabel had twin sons, William Milligan Sloane and James Ross Sloane, born on January 16 or 17, 1921 in Paris, France. William Milligan Sloane (the grandson) was a marine aviator and corporate lawyer who married Martha Chamberlin.

== Publications ==
- The Poet Labid: His Life, Times, and Fragmentary Writings (1877)
- Life and Work of James Renwick Wilson Sloane, his father (1888)
- The French War and the Revolution (1893)
- The Life of Napoleon Bonaparte (four volumes, 1896; revised and enlarged edition, 1911)
- Life of James McCosh (1896)
- The French Revolution and Religious Reform (1901)
- Party Government in the United States of America (1914)
- The Balkans: A Laboratory of History. New York and Cincinnati: Eaton & Mains and Jennings & Graham. 1914 – via Internet Archive.
