= Monroeville, Jefferson County, Ohio =

Unincorporated community in Ohio, U.S.

Coordinates: 40°35′52″N 80°50′15″W

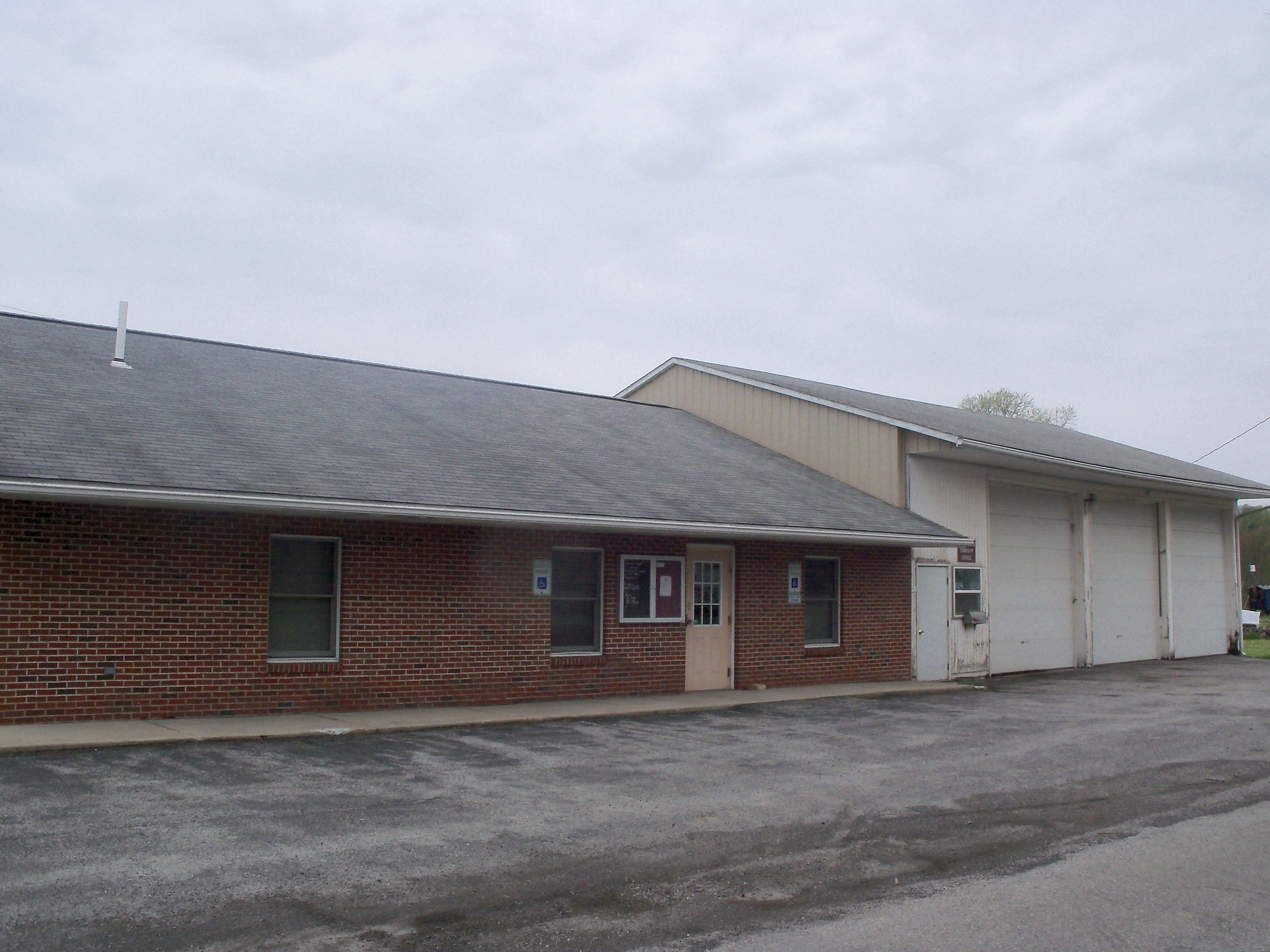
The Brush Creek Township garage is located in Monroeville.

Monroeville is an unincorporated community in Jefferson County, in the U.S. state of Ohio.

== History ==
A former variant name of Monroeville was Croxton, for founder Abraham Croxton. Monroeville was laid out in 1836. The name honors James Monroe, 5th President of the United States. A post office called Croxton was established in 1833, and remained in operation until 1895.
