= Brooke Hills Playhouse =

Coordinates: 40°15′52.7″N 80°32′33.0″W

The Brooke Hills Playhouse was established in present-day Brooke Hills Park and is located in the northern panhandle of West Virginia, in Brooke County. The playhouse was West Virginia's first traditional summer stock theater, and was started by four area residents: John Hennen of Wheeling, WV, Judith "Judy" Porter-Hennen of New Cumberland, West Virginia, Bill Harper of Chester, West Virginia, and Sharon Murphy Harper of Wellsburg, West Virginia.

The playhouse, which has been home to amateur theater for 43 seasons, is a division of the Brooke County Arts Council. The playhouse traditionally performs five shows per season, ranging from farce comedies to musical productions to melodramas. Auditions are open to the public.

The "barn," as it is often called, was once the actual barn of the wealthy and prominent S.C. Gist and the Gist family of Wellsburg, West Virginia in the 18th and 19th century.

== Parking Lot Players ==
The majority of shows featured at the playhouse are geared for adult actors with few parts available to child actors; however, every season for the past several years has boasted a musical production by the Parking Lot Players, a troupe of school age children ranging from elementary through high school and so named because of their long established history of entertaining patrons in the parking lot before a show and during intermission. Seven years ago the Parking Lot Players were given their own set and stage time and have become very popular amongst patrons.
