= Rabbit Hill, West Virginia =

- Unincorporated community
- Location within the state of West Virginia Rabbit Hill (the United States)
- Coordinates: 40°17′31″N 80°36′5″W
- Country: United States
- State: West Virginia
- County: Brooke
- Elevation: 978 ft (298 m)
- Time zone: UTC-5 (Eastern (EST))
  - Summer (DST): UTC-4 (EDT)
- GNIS ID: 1555429

Rabbit Hill is an unincorporated community in Brooke County, West Virginia, United States.
