= Wolf Run, Ohio =

Unincorporated community in Ohio, U.S.

Coordinates: 40°28′02″N 80°53′21″W

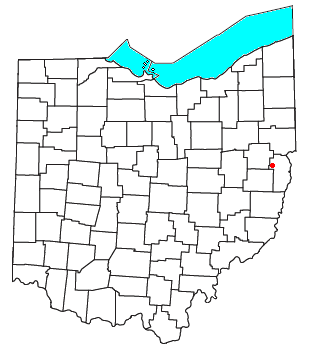
Location of Wolf Run, Ohio

Wolf Run is an unincorporated community in eastern Springfield Township, Jefferson County, Ohio, United States. It has a post office with the ZIP code 43970. The stream of Wolf Run, which flows northward past the community, is a tributary of Goose Creek, which in turn flows southward to meet Cross Creek in Harrison County's German Township, which in turn flows eastward to meet the Ohio River at Mingo Junction.

Wolf Run is part of the Weirton–Steubenville, WV-OH Metropolitan Statistical Area.
