= Beech Bottom, West Virginia =

- Village
- Seal

- Location of Beech Bottom in Brooke County, West Virginia.
- Coordinates: 40°13′27″N 80°39′8″W
- Country: United States
- State: West Virginia
- County: Brooke
- Incorporated: 1953

Area
  - Total: 1.86 sq mi (4.83 km^{2})
  - Land: 1.16 sq mi (3.01 km^{2})
  - Water: 0.70 sq mi (1.82 km^{2})
- Elevation: 712 ft (217 m)

Population (2020)
  - Total: 553
  - Density: 403.6/sq mi (155.82/km^{2})
- Time zone: UTC-5 (Eastern (EST))
  - Summer (DST): UTC-4 (EDT)
- ZIP code: 26030
- Area code: 304
- FIPS code: 54-05452
- GNIS feature ID: 1535513
- Website: https://www.beechbottomwv.org/index.php

Beech Bottom is a village in Brooke County, West Virginia, United States, situated along the Ohio River. The population was 553 at the 2020 census. It is part of the Weirton–Steubenville metropolitan area. Beech Bottom was incorporated in 1953.

== Geography ==
Beech Bottom is located at 40°13′27″N 80°39′8″W (40.224276, -80.652181).

According to the United States Census Bureau, the village has a total area of 1.86 square miles (4.82 km^{2}), of which 1.16 square miles (3.00 km^{2}) is land and 0.70 square miles (1.81 km^{2}) is water.

== Demographics ==
Historical population
Census	Pop.	Note	%±
1960	506		—
1970	544		7.5%
1980	507		−6.8%
1990	415		−18.1%
2000	606		46.0%
2010	523		−13.7%
2020	553		5.7%
U.S. Decennial Census

=== 2010 census ===
As of the census of 2010, there were 523 people, 209 households, and 141 families living in the village. The population density was 450.9 inhabitants per square mile (174.1/km^{2}). There were 257 housing units at an average density of 221.6 per square mile (85.6/km^{2}). The racial makeup of the village was 98.5% White, 0.4% African American, 0.8% Asian, and 0.4% from two or more races. Hispanic or Latino of any race were 0.8% of the population.

There were 209 households, of which 29.2% had children under the age of 18 living with them, 47.8% were married couples living together, 14.4% had a female householder with no husband present, 5.3% had a male householder with no wife present, and 32.5% were non-families. 27.8% of all households were made up of individuals, and 13.4% had someone living alone who was 65 years of age or older. The average household size was 2.50 and the average family size was 3.06.

The median age in the village was 42.1 years. 23.7% of residents were under the age of 18; 7.9% were between the ages of 18 and 24; 23.4% were from 25 to 44; 27.2% were from 45 to 64; and 18% were 65 years of age or older. The gender makeup of the village was 47.8% male and 52.2% female.

=== 2000 census ===
As of the census of 2000, there were 606 people, 226 households, and 153 families living in the village. The population density was 721.6 people per square mile (278.5/km^{2}). There were 240 housing units at an average density of 285.8 per square mile (110.3/km^{2}). The racial makeup of the village was 99.17% White, 0.17% Native American, and 0.66% from two or more races.

There were 226 households, out of which 34.1% had children under the age of 18 living with them, 47.3% were married couples living together, 16.8% had a female householder with no husband present, and 32.3% were non-families. 30.1% of all households were made up of individuals, and 15.5% had someone living alone who was 65 years of age or older. The average household size was 2.32 and the average family size was 2.85.

In the village, the population was spread out, with 20.5% under the age of 18, 7.1% from 18 to 24, 25.9% from 25 to 44, 19.6% from 45 to 64, and 26.9% who were 65 years of age or older. The median age was 43 years. For every 100 females, there were 83.6 males. For every 100 females age 18 and over, there were 76.6 males.

The median income for a household in the village was $33,393, and the median income for a family was $38,281. Males had a median income of $30,455 versus $20,875 for females. The per capita income for the village was $15,455. About 12.7% of families and 11.2% of the population were below the poverty line, including 14.7% of those under age 18 and 11.2% of those age 65 or over.

== Climate ==
The climate in this area is characterized by relatively high temperatures and evenly distributed precipitation throughout the year. According to the Köppen Climate Classification system, Beech Bottom has a Humid subtropical climate, abbreviated "Cfa" on climate maps.

Climate data for Beech Bottom, West Virginia
Month	Jan	Feb	Mar	Apr	May	Jun	Jul	Aug	Sep	Oct	Nov	Dec	Year
Mean daily maximum °C (°F)	4 (39)	5 (41)	11 (52)	18 (64)	23 (74)	28 (82)	29 (85)	29 (84)	26 (78)	19 (66)	12 (53)	5 (41)	17 (63)
Mean daily minimum °C (°F)	−6 (21)	−6 (21)	−2 (29)	3 (38)	8 (47)	13 (56)	16 (60)	15 (59)	11 (52)	5 (41)	0 (32)	−4 (25)	4 (40)
Average precipitation cm (inches)	7.6 (3)	5.8 (2.3)	8.6 (3.4)	8.6 (3.4)	9.7 (3.8)	9.9 (3.9)	11 (4.3)	9.1 (3.6)	7.6 (3)	6.9 (2.7)	7.1 (2.8)	7.1 (2.8)	99 (38.9)
Source: Weatherbase

== See also ==
- List of cities and towns along the Ohio River
