= Brooke County Schools =

School district in West Virginia, United States

Location
- Brooke County, West Virginia

District information
- Type: Public
- Superintendent: Jeffrey R. Crook
- NCES District ID: 5400150

Other information
- Website: www.brooke.k12.wv.us

Brooke County Schools is the operating school district within Brooke County, West Virginia.

== Schools ==
The following schools are in Brooke County Schools:

=== High schools ===
- Brooke High School

=== Middle schools ===
- Brooke Middle School

=== Elementary schools ===
- Brooke Intermediate School North
- Brooke Intermediate School South
- Brooke Primary School North
- Brooke Primary School South

=== Other ===
- The Bruin Bridge
