= Rich Thomaselli =

American football player (born 1957)

No. 28
- Position: Running back

Personal information
- Born: February 26, 1957 (age 69); Follansbee, West Virginia, U.S.
- Listed height: 6 ft 1 in (1.85 m)
- Listed weight: 199 lb (90 kg)

Career information
- High school: Brooke (Wellsburg, West Virginia)
- College: West Virginia Wesleyan (1975–1978)
- NFL draft: 1979: undrafted

Career history

Playing
- West Virginia Rockets (1980); Houston Oilers (1981–1983); Green Bay Packers (1984)*; Montreal Alouettes (1985)
- * Offseason or practice squad member only

Coaching
- Bridgewater State (1980) Assistant

Career NFL statistics
- Games played: 21
- Stats at Pro Football Reference

Richard J. Thomaselli (born February 26, 1957) is an American former professional football player who was a running back for the Houston Oilers of the National Football League (NFL). He played college football for the West Virginia Wesleyan Bobcats and also played for the Montreal Alouettes of the Canadian Football League (CFL).
