= Logrow, West Virginia =

- Unincorporated community
- Location within the state of West Virginia Logrow (the United States)
- Coordinates: 40°22′38″N 80°33′29″W
- Country: United States
- State: West Virginia
- County: Brooke
- Elevation: 804 ft (245 m)
- Time zone: UTC-5 (Eastern (EST))
  - Summer (DST): UTC-4 (EDT)
- GNIS ID: 1558307

Logrow is an unincorporated community in Brooke County, West Virginia, United States.

Logrow was named for a grove of locust trees near the original town site, according to local history.
