= East Springfield, Ohio =

- Census-designated place
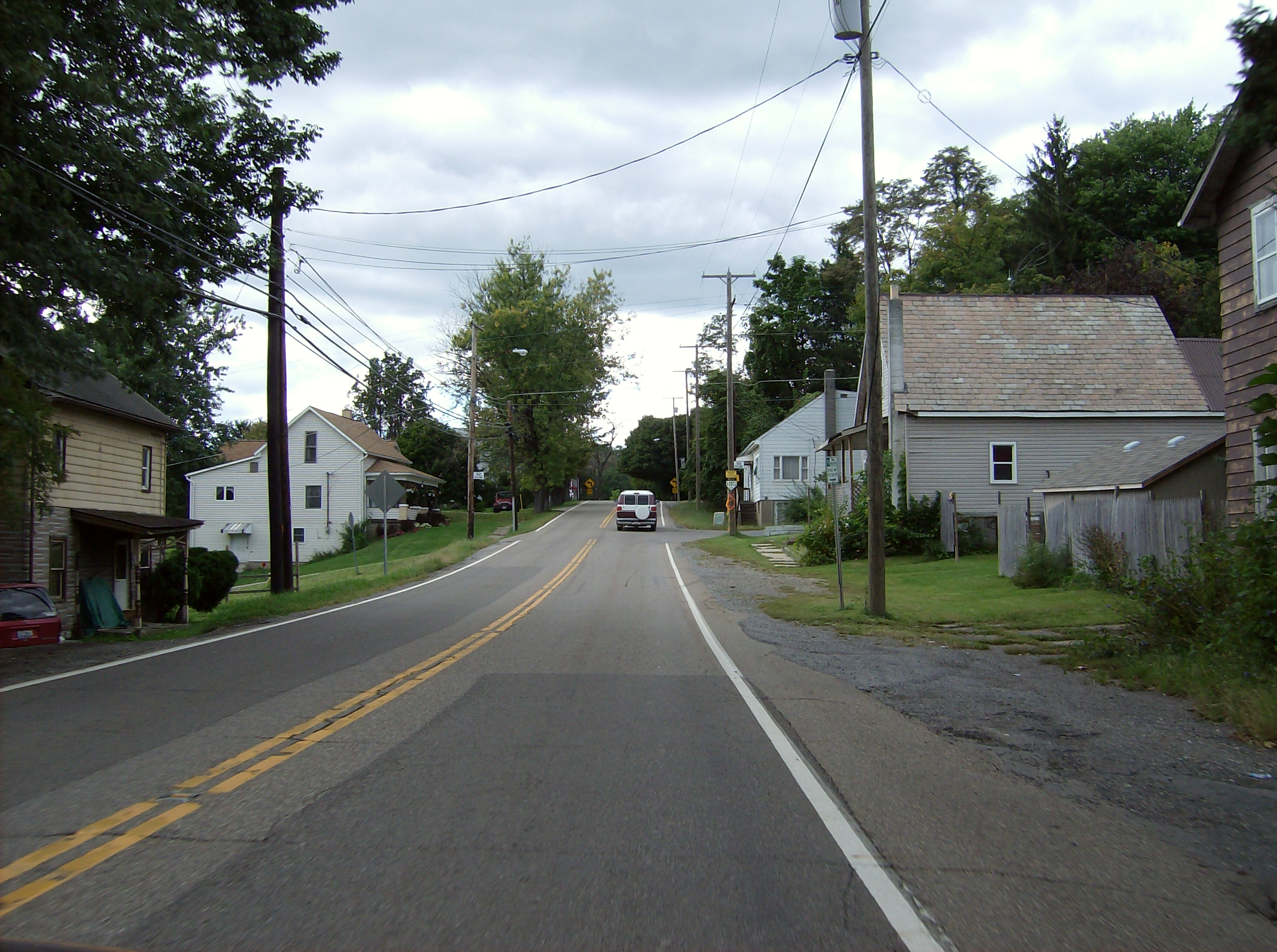
- Travelling through East Springfield on Ohio State Route 43

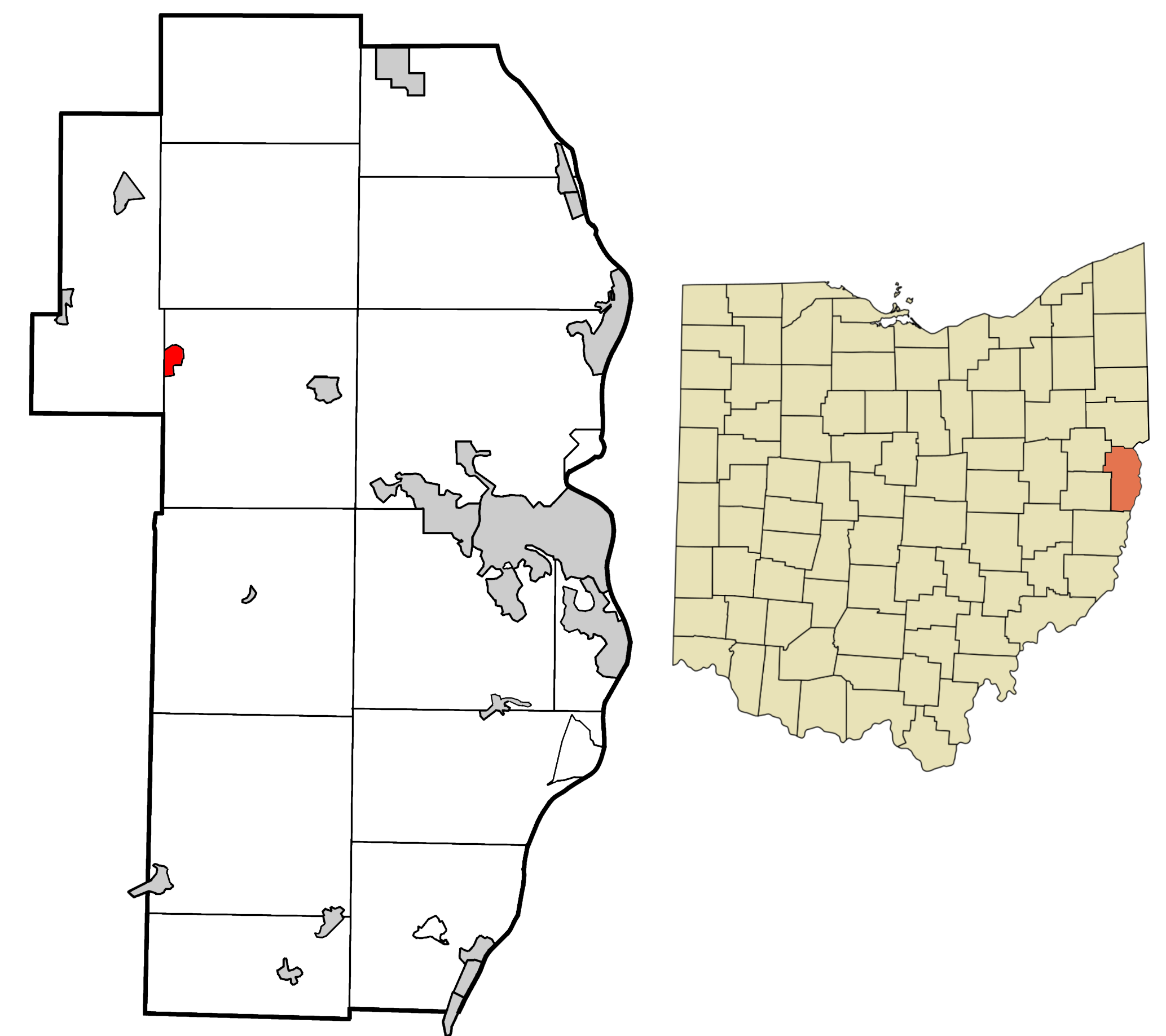
- Location of East Springfield in Jefferson County and in the state of Ohio
- Coordinates: 40°26′51″N 80°51′36″W
- Country: United States
- State: Ohio
- County: Jefferson
- Township: Salem

Area
  - Total: 0.41 sq mi (1.06 km^{2})
  - Land: 0.41 sq mi (1.06 km^{2})
  - Water: 0 sq mi (0.00 km^{2})
- Elevation: 1,240 ft (380 m)

Population (2020)
  - Total: 185
  - Density: 450.8/sq mi (174.05/km^{2})
- Time zone: UTC-5 (Eastern (EST))
  - Summer (DST): UTC-4 (EDT)
- ZIP code: 43925
- Area code: 740
- FIPS code: 39-24066
- GNIS Feature ID: 2628890

East Springfield is a census-designated place (CDP) in northwestern Salem Township, Jefferson County, Ohio, United States. As of the 2020 census, East Springfield had a population of 185. It has a post office with the ZIP code 43925. It lies along State Route 43, 16 miles (26 km) northwest of the county seat of Steubenville and 17 miles (27 km) southeast of Carrollton. The community is part of the Weirton–Steubenville, WV-OH Metropolitan Statistical Area.

== History ==
East Springfield was laid out in 1803. A post office called East Springfield has been in operation since 1849.

== Demographics ==
Historical population
Census	Pop.	Note	%±
2020	185		—
U.S. Decennial Census

== Education ==
East Springfield is part of the Edison Local School District. Campuses serving the community include the John Gregg Elementary School (Preschool-Grade 4), Springfield Middle School (Grades 5–8), and Edison High School (Grades 9–12).
