= Brush Creek Township, Jefferson County, Ohio =

Township in Ohio, US

- Township
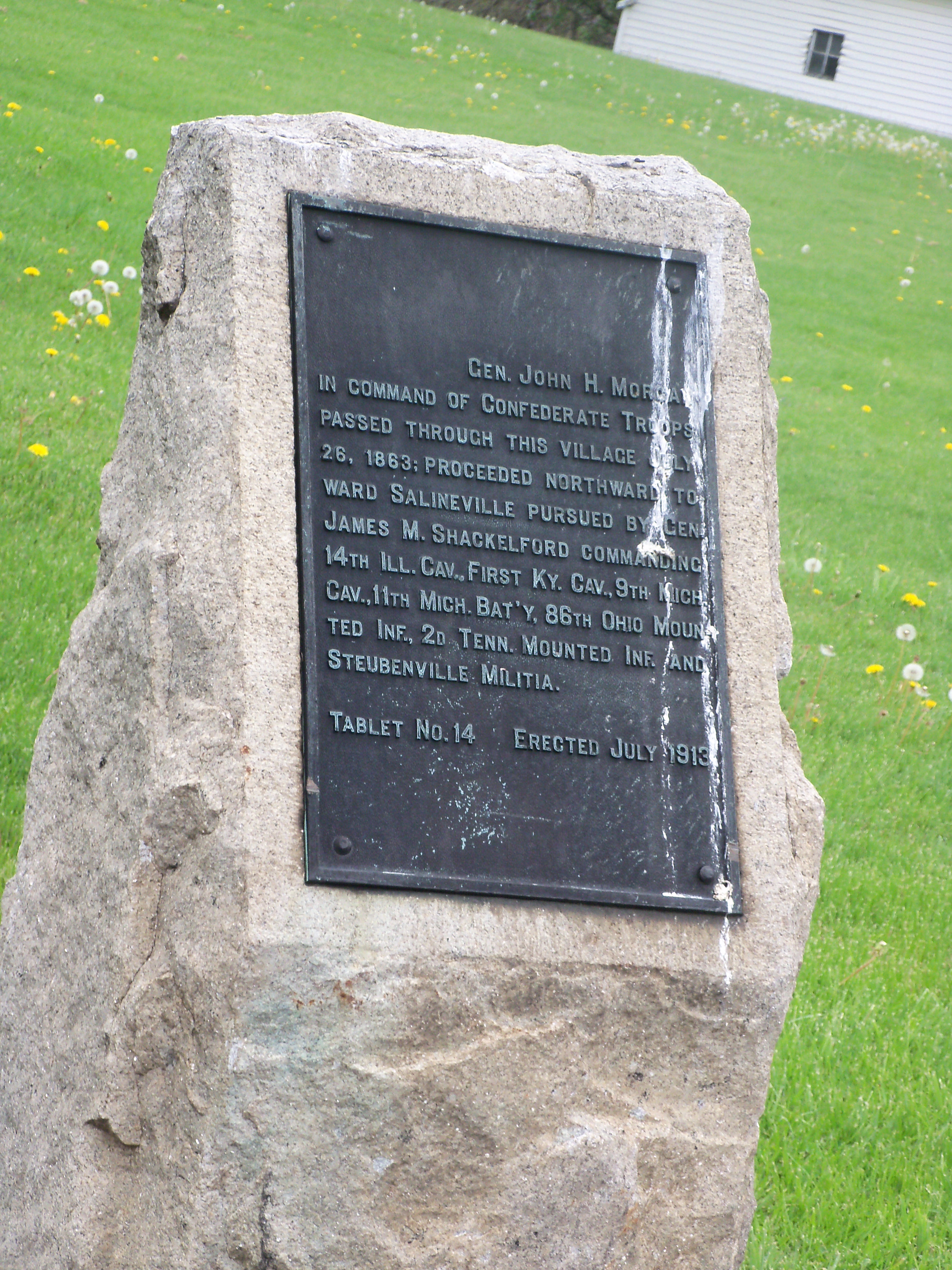
- Confederate general John Hunt Morgan passed through here shortly before he was defeated at the nearby Battle of Salineville

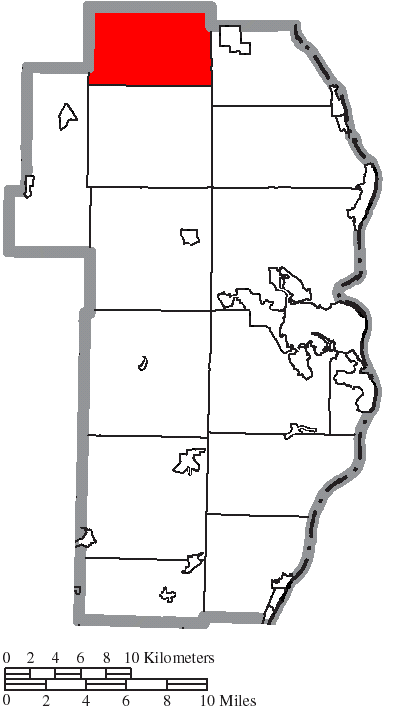
- Location of Brush Creek Township in Jefferson County
- Coordinates: 40°33′52″N 80°48′40″W
- Country: United States
- State: Ohio
- County: Jefferson

Area
  - Total: 23.7 sq mi (61.3 km^{2})
  - Land: 23.7 sq mi (61.3 km^{2})
  - Water: 0 sq mi (0.0 km^{2})
- Elevation: 1,266 ft (386 m)

Population (2020)
  - Total: 384
  - Density: 16.2/sq mi (6.26/km^{2})
- Time zone: UTC-5 (Eastern (EST))
  - Summer (DST): UTC-4 (EDT)
- FIPS code: 39-09750
- GNIS feature ID: 1086376

Brush Creek Township is one of the fourteen townships of Jefferson County, Ohio, United States. The 2020 census found 384 people in the township.

== Geography ==
Located in the northwestern corner of the county, it borders the following townships:

- Washington Township, Columbiana County - north
- Yellow Creek Township, Columbiana County - northeast
- Saline Township - southeast
- Ross Township - south
- Springfield Township - southwest
- Fox Township, Carroll County - northwest

No municipalities are located in Brush Creek Township.

== Name and history ==
Brush Creek Township was organized in the 1830s. It was named from the Brush Creek which runs through it.

Statewide, other Brush Creek Townships are located in Adams, Muskingum, and Scioto counties, plus a Brushcreek Township in Highland County.

== Government ==
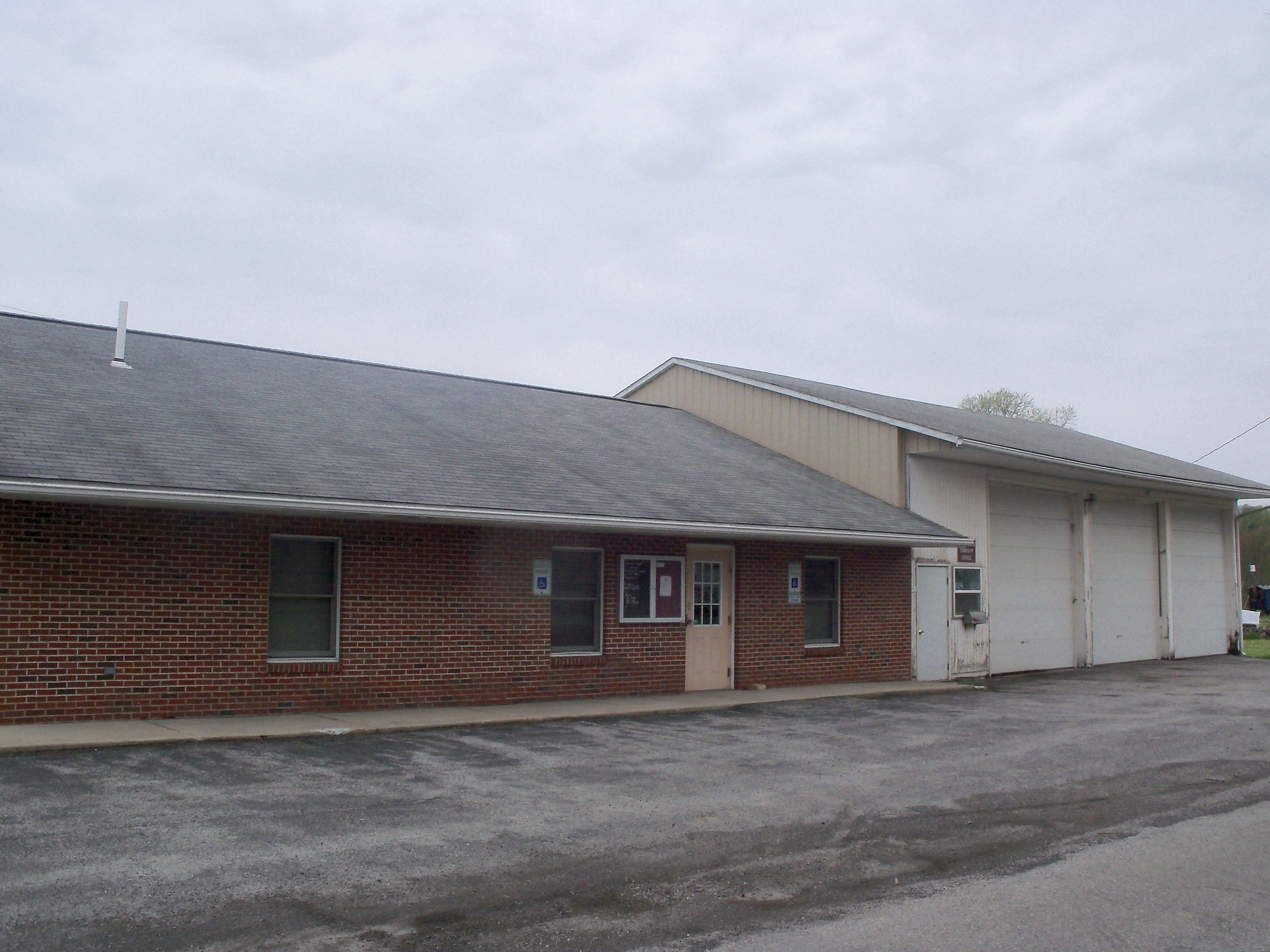
Brush Creek Township Hall in Monroeville

The township is governed by a three-member board of trustees, who are elected in November of odd-numbered years to a four-year term beginning on the following January 1. Two are elected in the year after the presidential election and one is elected in the year before it. There is also an elected township fiscal officer, who serves a four-year term beginning on April 1 of the year after the election, which is held in November of the year before the presidential election. Vacancies in the fiscal officership or on the board of trustees are filled by the remaining trustees.
