= Coketown, West Virginia =

Unincorporated community in West Virginia, United States

- Unincorporated community
- Location within the state of West Virginia Coketown (the United States)
- Coordinates: 40°20′44″N 80°36′20″W
- Country: United States
- State: West Virginia
- County: Brooke
- Time zone: UTC-5 (Eastern (EST))
  - Summer (DST): UTC-4 (EDT)
- GNIS feature ID: 1554171

Coketown is an unincorporated community on the Ohio River in Brooke County, West Virginia, United States. Coketown lies north of Follansbee along West Virginia State Route 2.
