= Salem Township, Jefferson County, Ohio =

Township in Ohio, US

- Township
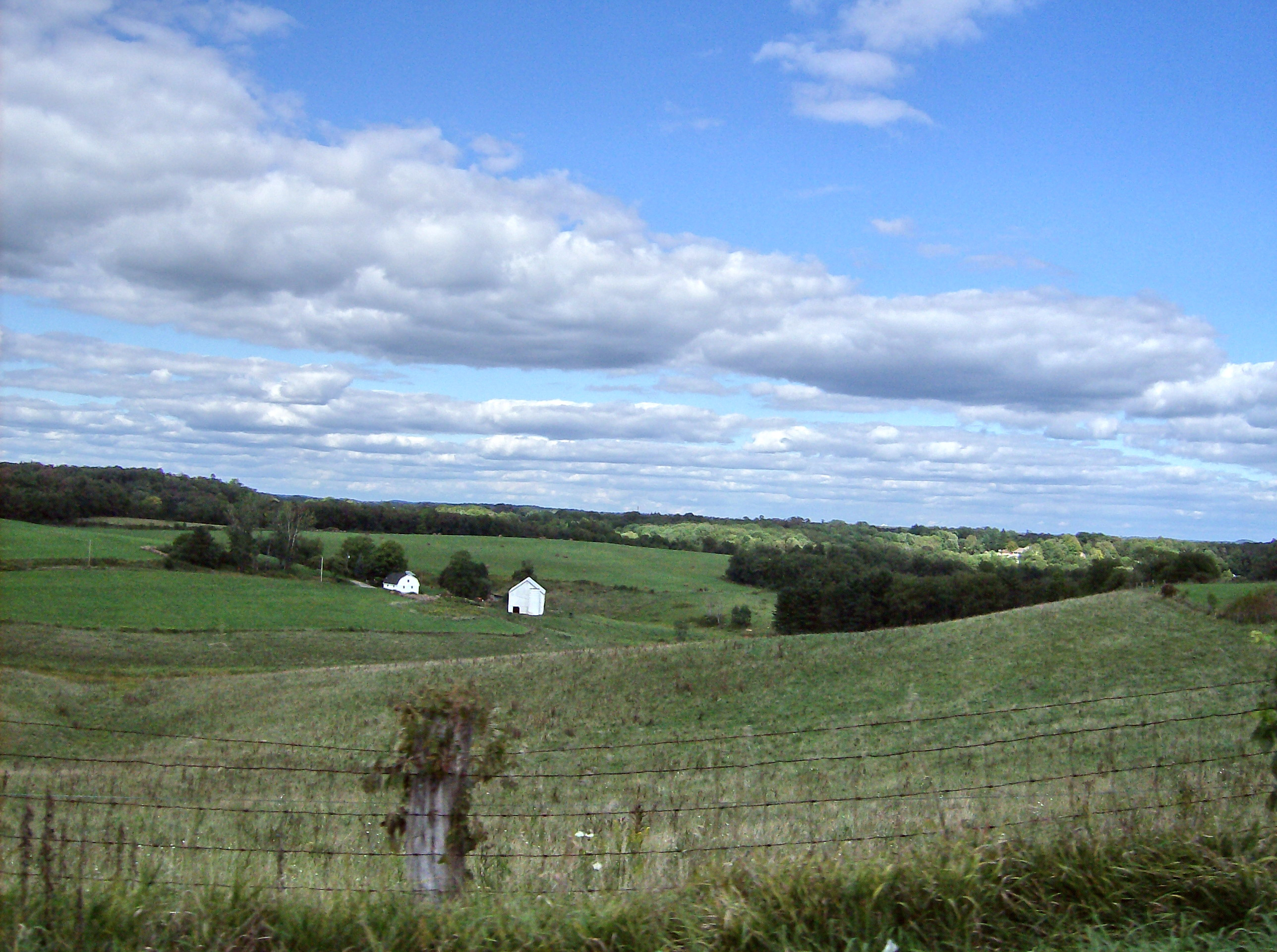
- Salem Township is a hilly area of fields and woods

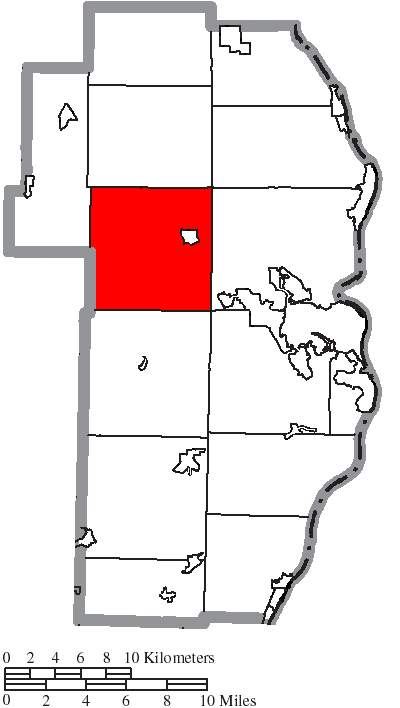
- Location of Salem Township in Jefferson County
- Coordinates: 40°25′26″N 80°49′36″W
- Country: United States
- State: Ohio
- County: Jefferson

Area
  - Total: 36.6 sq mi (94.7 km^{2})
  - Land: 36.5 sq mi (94.6 km^{2})
  - Water: 0.077 sq mi (0.2 km^{2})
- Elevation: 1,243 ft (379 m)

Population (2020)
  - Total: 2,778
  - Density: 76.1/sq mi (29.4/km^{2})
- Time zone: UTC-5 (Eastern (EST))
  - Summer (DST): UTC-4 (EDT)
- FIPS code: 39-69876
- GNIS feature ID: 1086382

Salem Township is one of the fourteen townships of Jefferson County, Ohio, United States. The 2020 census found 2,778 people in the township.

== Geography ==
Located in the western part of the county, it borders the following townships:

- Ross Township - north
- Knox Township - northeast corner
- Island Creek Township - east
- Cross Creek Township - southeast corner
- Wayne Township - south
- German Township, Harrison County - southwest
- Springfield Township - northwest

The village of Richmond is located in northeastern Salem Township, and the census-designated place of East Springfield lies in the northwestern part of the township.

== Name and history ==
Salem Township was founded in 1807.

It is one of fourteen Salem Townships statewide.

== Government ==
The township is governed by a three-member board of trustees, who are elected in November of odd-numbered years to a four-year term beginning on the following January 1. Two are elected in the year after the presidential election and one is elected in the year before it. There is also an elected township fiscal officer, who serves a four-year term beginning on April 1 of the year after the election, which is held in November of the year before the presidential election. Vacancies in the fiscal officership or on the board of trustees are filled by the remaining trustees.
