= East Steubenville, West Virginia =

Unincorporated community in West Virginia, United States

- Unincorporated community
- Location within the state of West Virginia East Steubenville (the United States)
- Coordinates: 40°21′24″N 80°35′57″W
- Country: United States
- State: West Virginia
- County: Brooke
- Time zone: UTC-5 (Eastern (EST))
  - Summer (DST): UTC-4 (EDT)
- GNIS feature ID: 1554357

East Steubenville is an unincorporated community in Brooke County, West Virginia, United States. It lies across the Ohio River from Steubenville, Ohio. East Steubenville is the site of the East Steubenville Panhandle Archaic Site, discovered by the West Virginia Archaeological Society in 1938. The site consists of the remains of an ancient Native American encampment perched 300 feet above the Ohio River on a ridgetop.
