= Springfield Township, Jefferson County, Ohio =

Township in Ohio, US

- Township
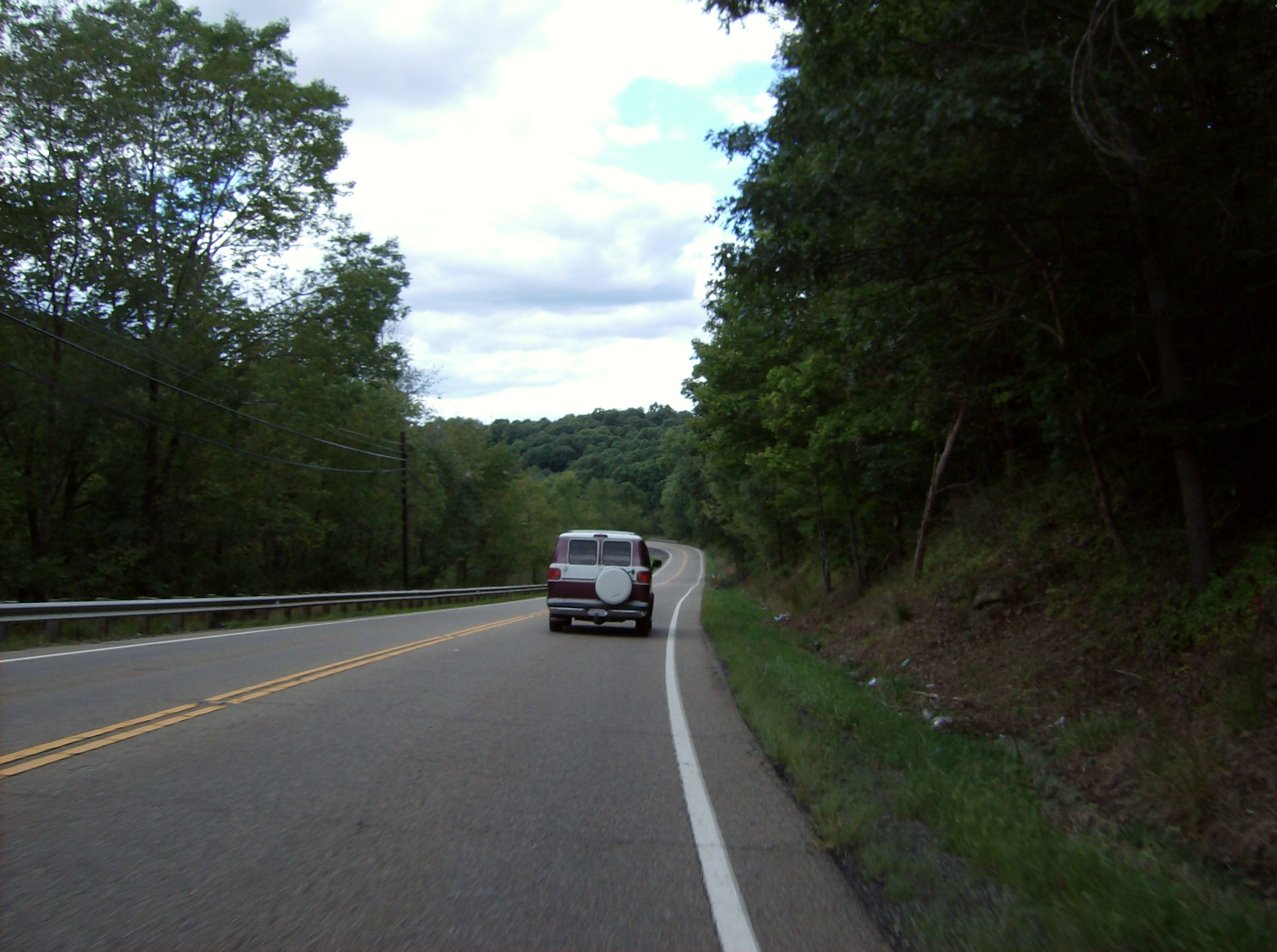
- State Route 43 travels through woodlands in Springfield Township

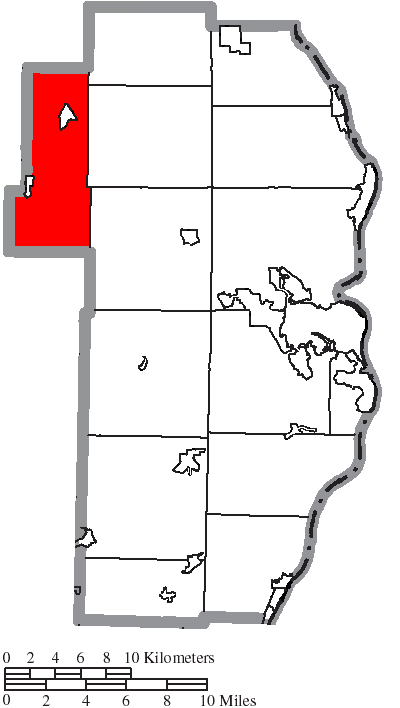
- Location of Springfield Township in Jefferson County
- Coordinates: 40°29′50″N 80°53′48″W
- Country: United States
- State: Ohio
- County: Jefferson

Area
  - Total: 30.7 sq mi (79.5 km^{2})
  - Land: 30.7 sq mi (79.5 km^{2})
  - Water: 0 sq mi (0.0 km^{2})
- Elevation: 902 ft (275 m)

Population (2020)
  - Total: 2,005
  - Density: 65.3/sq mi (25.2/km^{2})
- Time zone: UTC-5 (Eastern (EST))
  - Summer (DST): UTC-4 (EDT)
- FIPS code: 39-74122
- GNIS feature ID: 1086385

Springfield Township is one of the fourteen townships of Jefferson County, Ohio, United States. The 2020 census found 2,005 people in the township.

== Geography ==
Located in the far western part of the county, it borders the following townships:

- Fox Township, Carroll County - north
- Brush Creek Township - northeast
- Ross Township - east
- Salem Township - southeast
- German Township, Harrison County - south
- Loudon Township, Carroll County - southwest
- Lee Township, Carroll County - west

Several populated places are located in Springfield Township:

- The village of Amsterdam, in the west
- The village of Bergholz, in the north
- The unincorporated community of Wolf Run, in the east

== Name and history ==
Springfield Township was established in 1804. It is the oldest township in Jefferson County.

In the early 19th century, Springfield Township was the residence of the "Blind Twaddle" family, a family of nine children, six of whom were born blind. At the time, they were considered one of the most remarkable families in the state of Ohio, and perhaps the United States. They attracted universal attention from physicians and scientific men throughout the world. In 1818, the Ohio State Legislature passed "An act for the relief of John Twaddle", granting a quarter section of land to John and Mary Twaddle, the parents of the six blind children.

It is one of eleven Springfield Townships statewide.

== Government ==
The township is governed by a three-member board of trustees, who are elected in November of odd-numbered years to a four-year term beginning on the following January 1. Two are elected in the year after the presidential election and one is elected in the year before it. There is also an elected township fiscal officer, who serves a four-year term beginning on April 1 of the year after the election, which is held in November of the year before the presidential election. Vacancies in the fiscal officership or on the board of trustees are filled by the remaining trustees.
