= Knox Township, Jefferson County, Ohio =

Township in Ohio, US

- Township
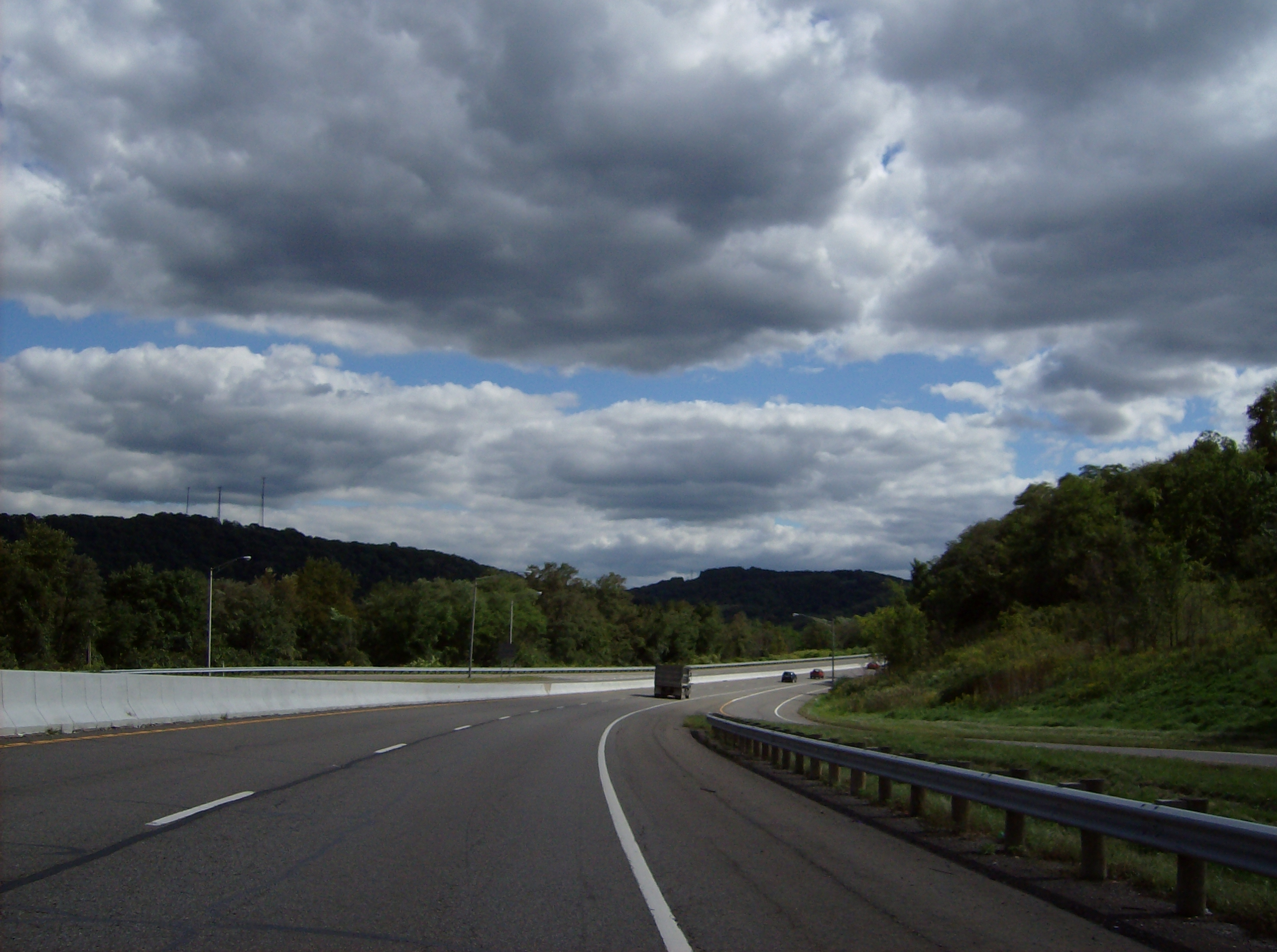
- Along State Route 7 in southern Knox Township

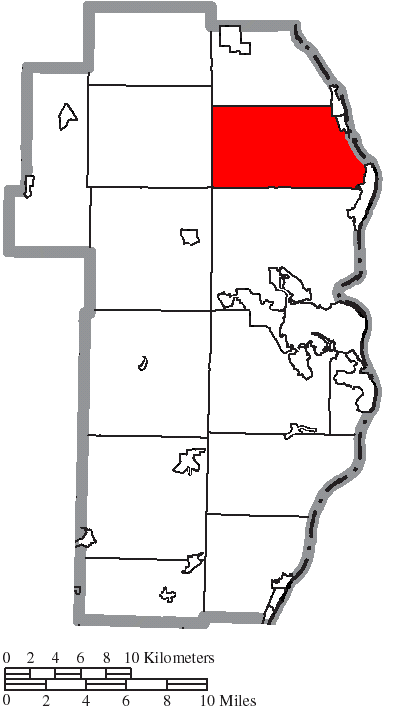
- Location of Knox Township in Jefferson County
- Coordinates: 40°28′51″N 80°38′15″W
- Country: United States
- State: Ohio
- County: Jefferson

Area
  - Total: 29.7 sq mi (76.8 km^{2})
  - Land: 29.3 sq mi (76.0 km^{2})
  - Water: 0.31 sq mi (0.8 km^{2})
- Elevation: 955 ft (291 m)

Population (2020)
  - Total: 4,317
  - Density: 147/sq mi (56.8/km^{2})
- Time zone: UTC-5 (Eastern (EST))
  - Summer (DST): UTC-4 (EDT)
- FIPS code: 39-40866
- GNIS feature ID: 1086379
- Website: https://knoxtwpjeffersonoh.gov/

Knox Township is one of the fourteen townships of Jefferson County, Ohio, United States. The 2020 census found 4,317 people in the township.

== Geography ==
Located in the northeastern part of the county along the Ohio River, it borders the following townships:

- Saline Township - north
- Island Creek Township - south
- Salem Township - southwest corner
- Ross Township - west

Hancock County, West Virginia, lies across the Ohio River to the east.

Three incorporated municipalities are located along the Ohio River in eastern Knox Township:

- Part of the village of Stratton, upstream
- The village of Empire, in the middle
- Part of the city of Toronto, downstream

As well, the unincorporated community of New Somerset lies in the northern part of the township.

== Name and history ==
Knox Township is named for Henry Knox, first U.S. Secretary of War.

It is one of five Knox Townships statewide.

== Government ==
The township is governed by a three-member board of trustees, who are elected in November of odd-numbered years to a four-year term beginning on the following January 1. Two are elected in the year after the presidential election and one is elected in the year before it. There is also an elected township fiscal officer, who serves a four-year term beginning on April 1 of the year after the election, which is held in November of the year before the presidential election. Vacancies in the fiscal officership or on the board of trustees are filled by the remaining trustees.
