= Brooke County, West Virginia =

County in West Virginia, United States

- County
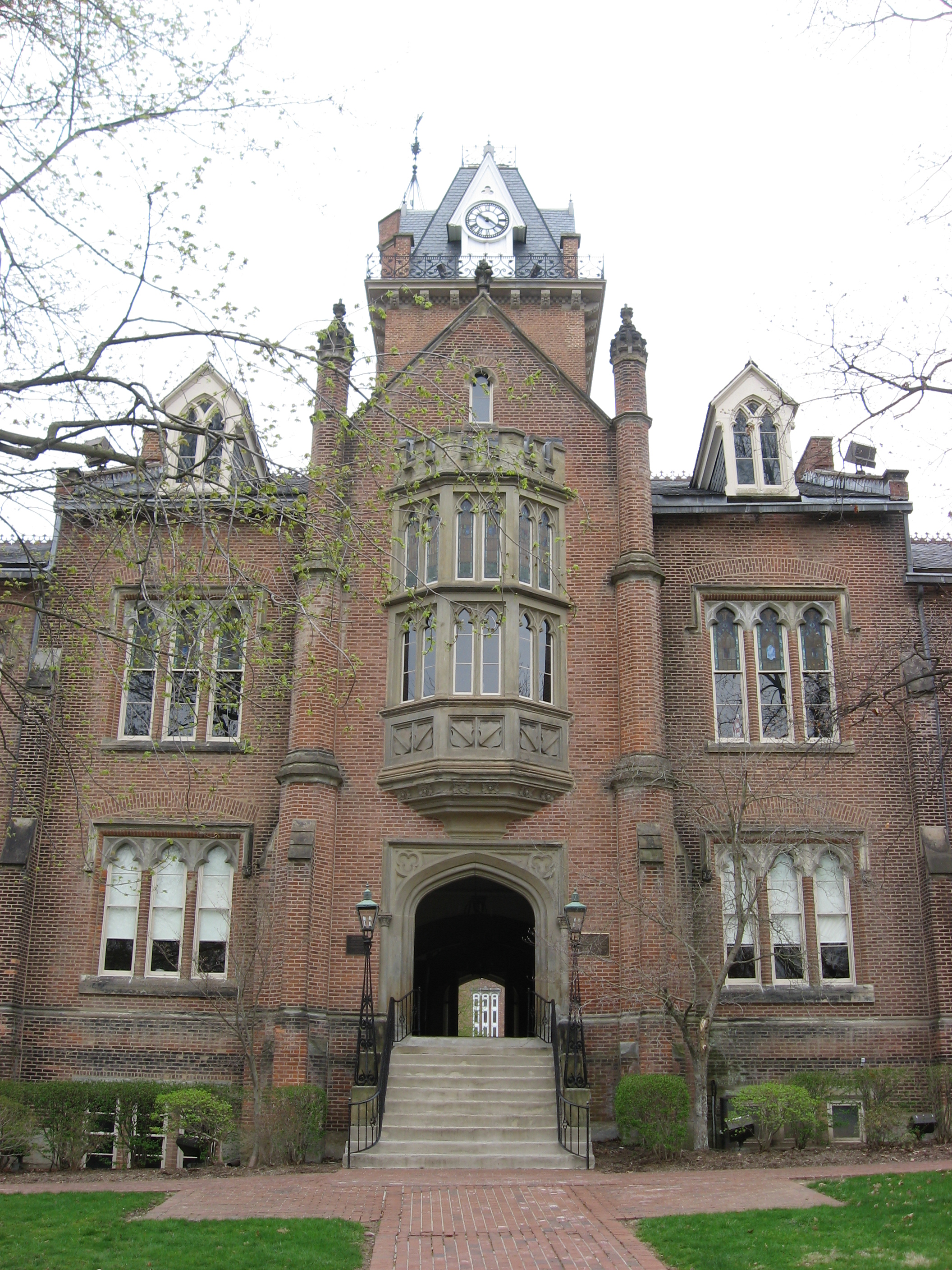
- Old Main, Bethany College

- Seal

- Location within the U.S. state of West Virginia
- Coordinates: 40°16′N 80°35′W
- Country: United States
- State: West Virginia
- Founded: November 30, 1797
- Named for: Robert Brooke
- Seat: Wellsburg
- Largest city: Follansbee

Area
  - Total: 92.57 sq mi (239.8 km^{2})
  - Land: 89.20 sq mi (231.0 km^{2})
  - Water: 3.37 sq mi (8.7 km^{2})

Population (2020)
  - Total: 22,559
  - Estimate (2025): 21,142 ▼
  - Density: 252.9/sq mi (97.6/km^{2})
- Time zone: UTC−5 (Eastern)
  - Summer (DST): UTC−4 (EDT)
- Congressional district: 1st
- Website: www.brookecountywv.gov

Brooke County is a county in the Northern Panhandle of the U.S. state of West Virginia. As of the 2020 census, the population was 22,559. Its county seat is Wellsburg. The county was created in 1797 from part of Ohio County and named in honor of Robert Brooke, Governor of Virginia from 1794 to 1796. Brooke County is part of the Weirton-Steubenville, WV-OH Metropolitan Statistical Area, which is also included in the Pittsburgh-New Castle-Weirton, PA-WV-OH Combined Statistical Area.

== History ==
The Ohio Company of Virginia petitioned the British King for 500,000 acres of land in the Ohio River Valley in 1747, but the first settlers to this area, in what later became known as West Virginia's Northern Panhandle, were brothers Jonathan, Israel and Friend Cox. They staked a "tomahawk claim" to 1200 acres (400 acres for each brother) at the mouth of Buffalo Creek and extending along the Ohio River. Their cousin George Cox staked an adjacent claim a few years later.

In 1788 Charles Prather purchased 481 acres from Friend Cox's heir, John Cox; by that year's end Alexander Wells, formerly of Baltimore, Maryland and later of Cross Creek Township, Pennsylvania, established a trading post (together with his Baltimore cousin Richard Owings). In 1791 the Ohio County Court incorporated the town around the post as "Charlestown" (after Prather's first name). On November 30, 1796, the Virginia General Assembly formed Brooke County, from parts of Ohio County, and designated "Charlestown" as the county seat. Across the Appalachian Continental Divide to the east in Jefferson County, another Charlestown had previously been incorporated (it is now known as Charles Town). In addition, Charleston had been established at the confluence of the Elk and Kanawha rivers in 1788.

Addressing this confusion, the Virginia General Assembly on December 28, 1816, changed the Brooke county seat's name from "Charlestown" to Wellsburg, supposedly to honor Charles Wells, Prather's son-in-law. The first Masonic Lodge west of the Allegheny Mountains was established in Wellsburg on March 4, 1799. It was under the jurisdiction of the Grand Lodge of Pennsylvania for six years, but since December 17, 1817, it has been under the jurisdiction of the Grand Lodge of Virginia and later of West Virginia.

The first glass factory in Wellsburg was built in 1813, taking advantage of the relatively easy transportation on the Ohio River. When the National Road was built about five years later, its first crossing of the Ohio River was via a ferry further west. In 1818 Alexander Campbell founded the first Virginia school west of the Appalachians, which the Virginia General Assembly chartered in 1840 as Bethany College.

During the American Civil War, Brooke County's elected officials helped found the new state of West Virginia, after their efforts to block secession failed at the Virginia Secession Convention of 1861. Wellsburg received a new charter in 1866 from the newly established West Virginia legislature, and Samuel Marks became Wellsburg's first elected mayor.

In 1863, West Virginia's counties were divided into civil townships, with the intention of encouraging local government. This proved impractical in the heavily rural state, and in 1872 the townships were converted into magisterial districts. Brooke County was divided into three districts: Buffalo, Cross Creek, and Wellsburg. Wellsburg District was co-extensive with the city of Wellsburg. The districts of Follansbee and Weirton were created between 1970 and 1980. Buffalo and Cross Creek Districts were discontinued in 2008.

== Geography ==
According to the United States Census Bureau, the county has a total area of 93 square miles (240 km^{2}), of which 89 square miles (230 km^{2}) is land and 3.4 square miles (8.8 km^{2}) (3.6%) is water. It is the second-smallest county in West Virginia by area. The highest point of elevation in Brooke County is approximately 1372 ft. and located about 1.5 miles south of Franklin.

=== Major highways ===
- US 22
- WV 2
- WV 27
- WV 27 Alt.
- WV 67
- WV 88
- WV 105

=== Adjacent counties ===
- Hancock County (north)
- Washington County, Pennsylvania (east)
- Ohio County (south)
- Jefferson County, Ohio (west)

=== National protected area ===
- Ohio River Islands National Wildlife Refuge (part)

== Demographics ==
Historical population
Census	Pop.	Note	%±
1800	4,706		—
1810	5,843		24.2%
1820	6,631		13.5%
1830	7,041		6.2%
1840	7,948		12.9%
1850	5,054		−36.4%
1860	5,494		8.7%
1870	5,464		−0.5%
1880	6,013		10.0%
1890	6,660		10.8%
1900	7,219		8.4%
1910	11,098		53.7%
1920	16,527		48.9%
1930	24,663		49.2%
1940	25,513		3.4%
1950	26,904		5.5%
1960	28,940		7.6%
1970	29,685		2.6%
1980	31,117		4.8%
1990	26,992		−13.3%
2000	25,447		−5.7%
2010	24,069		−5.4%
2020	22,559		−6.3%
2025 (est.)	21,142	▼	−6.3%
U.S. Decennial Census; 1790–1960 1900–1990; 1990–2000 2010–2020

=== 2020 census ===
As of the 2020 census, the county had a population of 22,559. Of the residents, 18.0% were under the age of 18 and 24.4% were 65 years of age or older; the median age was 47.1 years. For every 100 females there were 97.1 males, and for every 100 females age 18 and over there were 95.4 males.

The racial makeup of the county was 92.7% White, 1.6% Black or African American, 0.2% American Indian and Alaska Native, 0.2% Asian, 0.5% from some other race, and 4.8% from two or more races. Hispanic or Latino residents of any race comprised 1.3% of the population.

There were 9,683 households in the county, of which 24.0% had children under the age of 18 living with them and 27.3% had a female householder with no spouse or partner present. About 32.0% of all households were made up of individuals and 16.2% had someone living alone who was 65 years of age or older.

There were 10,719 housing units, of which 9.7% were vacant. Among occupied housing units, 74.2% were owner-occupied and 25.8% were renter-occupied. The homeowner vacancy rate was 2.0% and the rental vacancy rate was 8.6%.

Brooke County, West Virginia – Racial and ethnic composition Note: the US Census treats Hispanic/Latino as an ethnic category. This table excludes Latinos from the racial categories and assigns them to a separate category. Hispanics/Latinos may be of any race.
Race / Ethnicity (NH = Non-Hispanic)	Pop 2000	Pop 2010	Pop 2020	% 2000	% 2010	% 2020
White alone (NH)	24,841	23,241	20,792	97.61%	96.55%	92.16%
Black or African American alone (NH)	215	273	365	0.84%	1.13%	1.61%
Native American or Alaska Native alone (NH)	25	19	36	0.09%	0.07%	0.15%
Asian alone (NH)	87	95	55	0.34%	0.39%	0.24%
Pacific Islander alone (NH)	8	3	0	0.03%	0.01%	0.00%
Other race alone (NH)	3	16	70	0.01%	0.06%	0.31%
Mixed race or Multiracial (NH)	169	259	954	0.66%	1.07%	4.22%
Hispanic or Latino (any race)	99	163	287	0.38%	0.67%	1.27%
Total	25,447	24,069	22,559	100.00%	100.00%	100.00%

=== 2010 census ===
As of the 2010 United States census, there were 24,069 people, 10,020 households, and 6,636 families living in the county. The population density was 269.8 inhabitants per square mile (104.2/km^{2}). There were 10,967 housing units at an average density of 122.9 units per square mile (47.5 units/km^{2}). The racial makeup of the county was 97.0% white, 1.2% black or African American, 0.4% Asian, 0.1% American Indian, 0.2% from other races, and 1.1% from two or more races. Those of Hispanic or Latino origin made up 0.7% of the population. In terms of ancestry, 21.5% were German, 17.5% were Irish, 16.4% were Italian, 11.5% were English, 7.2% were American, 5.9% were Scotch-Irish, and 5.7% were Polish.

Of the 10,020 households, 25.8% had children under the age of 18 living with them, 50.7% were married couples living together, 10.7% had a female householder with no husband present, 33.8% were non-families, and 29.2% of all households were made up of individuals. The average household size was 2.32 and the average family size was 2.83. The median age was 44.8 years.

The median income for a household in the county was $39,475 and the median income for a family was $52,528. Males had a median income of $39,065 versus $29,824 for females. The per capita income for the county was $22,377. About 7.9% of families and 11.0% of the population were below the poverty line, including 16.5% of those under age 18 and 7.8% of those age 65 or over.

=== 2000 census ===
As of the census of 2000, there were 25,447 people, 10,396 households, and 7,152 families living in the county. The population density was 286 inhabitants per square mile (110/km^{2}). There were 11,150 housing units at an average density of 126 units per square mile (49 units/km^{2}). The racial makeup of the county was 97.90% White, 0.85% Black or African American, 0.10% Native American, 0.34% Asian, 0.04% Pacific Islander, 0.09% from other races, and 0.69% from two or more races. 0.39% of the population were Hispanic or Latino of any race.

There were 10,396 households, out of which 26.90% had children under the age of 18 living with them, 55.30% were married couples living together, 9.90% had a female householder with no husband present, and 31.20% were non-families. 27.90% of all households were made up of individuals, and 14.40% had someone living alone who was 65 years of age or older. The average household size was 2.36 and the average family size was 2.88.

In the county, the population was spread out, with 20.40% under the age of 18, 9.40% from 18 to 24, 25.80% from 25 to 44, 26.00% from 45 to 64, and 18.30% who were 65 years of age or older. The median age was 41 years. For every 100 females there were 91.80 males. For every 100 females age 18 and over, there were 89.90 males.

The median income for a household in the county was $32,981, and the median income for a family was $39,948. Males had a median income of $34,397 versus $19,711 for females. The per capita income for the county was $17,131. About 9.50% of families and 11.70% of the population were below the poverty line, including 16.40% of those under age 18 and 9.10% of those age 65 or over.

== Law and government ==
Brooke County is governed by a three-member County Commission who each serve in rotating 6-year terms. The terms are designed such that one seat is up for election in even years. The County Commission annually chooses its own President. The Brooke County Commissioners in 2022 are President AJ Thomas, Tim Ennis, and Stacey Wise.

Brooke County is part of the First Judicial Circuit of West Virginia, which also includes Hancock and Ohio counties. In West Virginia, Circuit Judges are elected in non-partisan elections to eight-year terms. The current judges of the First Judicial Circuit are the Hon. Jason A. Cuomo, the Hon. James Mazzone, the Hon. David J. Sims, and the Hon. Ronald E. Wilson. All four Circuit Court judges were re-elected in November 2016.

Brooke County is part of the First Family Court Circuit of West Virginia which also includes Hancock and Ohio Counties. In West Virginia, Family Court Judges were first elected to six-year terms beginning in 2002 and were elected to eight-year terms beginning in 2008. The current judges of the First Family Court Circuit are the Hon. Joyce Chernenko and the Hon. William Sinclair who were both elected to eight-year terms in November 2008.

Magistrates are elected in partisan elections serving four-year terms. Vacancies occurring in unexpired terms can be filled by a respective Circuit Court Judge. Unlike Circuit Court judges or Family Court judges, magistrates are not required to be attorneys. Brooke County currently has two magistrates: Robin Snyder and Danielle Diserio.

=== Politics ===
Abutting free states Ohio and Pennsylvania, and with a largely German-American culture unlike any other part of antebellum Virginia, Brooke County and the rest of the Northern Panhandle were central to the vanguard who made West Virginia a new state during the Civil War. For the next six and a half decades, the county, aided by its association with Pennsylvania's powerful ironmonger-led Republican machines, voted solidly Republican to the point of supporting William Howard Taft during the disastrously divided 1912 election. From the New Deal until Bill Clinton, however, powerful unionization meant that Brooke County turned from solidly Republican to solidly Democratic except when the Democrats nominated the liberal George McGovern in 1972. Like all of West Virginia, since 2000 a combination of declining unionization and differences with the Democratic Party's liberal views on social issues has produced a dramatic swing to the Republican Party.

United States presidential election results for Brooke County, West Virginia
Year	Republican		Democratic		Third party(ies)	
Year	No.	%	No.	%	No.	%
1912	972	38.59%	850	33.74%	697	27.67%
1916	1,422	50.73%	1,261	44.99%	120	4.28%
1920	3,060	57.36%	2,129	39.91%	146	2.74%
1924	3,858	59.34%	2,037	31.33%	606	9.32%
1928	5,277	68.14%	2,419	31.24%	48	0.62%
1932	4,010	43.56%	4,919	53.43%	277	3.01%
1936	3,485	36.70%	5,955	62.72%	55	0.58%
1940	4,004	38.43%	6,416	61.57%	0	0.00%
1944	3,588	38.52%	5,726	61.48%	0	0.00%
1948	3,718	35.37%	6,680	63.55%	114	1.08%
1952	5,073	40.06%	7,591	59.94%	0	0.00%
1956	5,944	45.67%	7,072	54.33%	0	0.00%
1960	5,754	42.33%	7,838	57.67%	0	0.00%
1964	3,364	25.49%	9,834	74.51%	0	0.00%
1968	4,191	31.89%	7,506	57.12%	1,444	10.99%
1972	7,544	59.08%	5,226	40.92%	0	0.00%
1976	4,792	36.89%	8,197	63.11%	0	0.00%
1980	4,622	39.19%	6,430	54.51%	743	6.30%
1984	4,819	41.91%	6,636	57.71%	43	0.37%
1988	4,006	38.87%	6,258	60.72%	42	0.41%
1992	2,582	24.79%	5,693	54.66%	2,140	20.55%
1996	2,741	28.85%	5,338	56.19%	1,421	14.96%
2000	4,195	44.60%	4,678	49.74%	532	5.66%
2004	5,189	48.17%	5,493	50.99%	91	0.84%
2008	4,961	50.33%	4,717	47.85%	179	1.82%
2012	5,060	54.25%	4,005	42.94%	263	2.82%
2016	6,625	68.33%	2,568	26.49%	503	5.19%
2020	7,545	70.81%	2,947	27.66%	164	1.54%
2024	6,986	71.42%	2,621	26.79%	175	1.79%

== Education ==
Brooke County is the home of Bethany College which is the oldest private college in the state.

== Communities ==
=== Cities ===
- Follansbee
- Weirton (part)
- Wellsburg (county seat)

=== Town ===
- Bethany

=== Villages ===
- Beech Bottom
- Windsor Heights

=== Magisterial districts ===
==== Current ====
- Follansbee
- Weirton
- Wellsburg

==== Historic ====
- Buffalo
- Cross Creek

=== Census-designated places ===
- Colliers
- Hooverson Heights

=== Unincorporated communities ===
- Arnold
- Coketown
- Dutch Town
- East Steubenville
- Fowlerstown
- Franklin
- Logrow
- Louise
- Power
- Rabbit Hill
- Rockdale
- Short Creek
- Virginville

== See also ==
- Brooke County Schools
- Brooke Hills Playhouse
- Castleman Run Lake Wildlife Management Area
- Cross Creek Wildlife Management Area
- National Register of Historic Places listings in Brooke County, West Virginia
