= Short Creek, West Virginia =

- Unincorporated community
- Location of community in West Virginia Short Creek (the United States)
- Coordinates: 40°11′8″N 80°40′28″W
- Country: United States
- State: West Virginia
- County: Brooke
- Time zone: UTC-5 (Eastern (EST))
  - Summer (DST): UTC-4 (EDT)
- ZIP codes: 26058
- GNIS feature ID: 1546721

Short Creek is an unincorporated community in Brooke County, West Virginia, United States. Approximately 1/2 mile from the Ohio River, Short Creek flows from northern Ohio County into Brooke County. The creek, Short Creek, has two forks, North and South Fork. Both forks rise in the very western reaches of Washington County, and very southwestern Allegheny County, in Pennsylvania. There are several very small settlements along the creek. There were small family farms and coal mines along the creek.

There are dwellings along the creek from the bottom of Dean's Hill and the bottom of West Liberty Hill to the mouth of Short Creek at the Ohio River.

Wheeling is the primary shopping area.
