= Rockdale, West Virginia =

- Unincorporated community
- Location within the state of West Virginia Rockdale (the United States)
- Coordinates: 40°18′17″N 80°34′48″W
- Country: United States
- State: West Virginia
- County: Brooke
- Time zone: UTC-5 (Eastern (EST))
  - Summer (DST): UTC-4 (EDT)
- GNIS feature ID: 1545957

Rockdale is an unincorporated community on Cross Creek in Brooke County, West Virginia, United States.
