= Daniel McBean Farmstead =

Historic house in Ohio, United States

- U.S. National Register of Historic Places
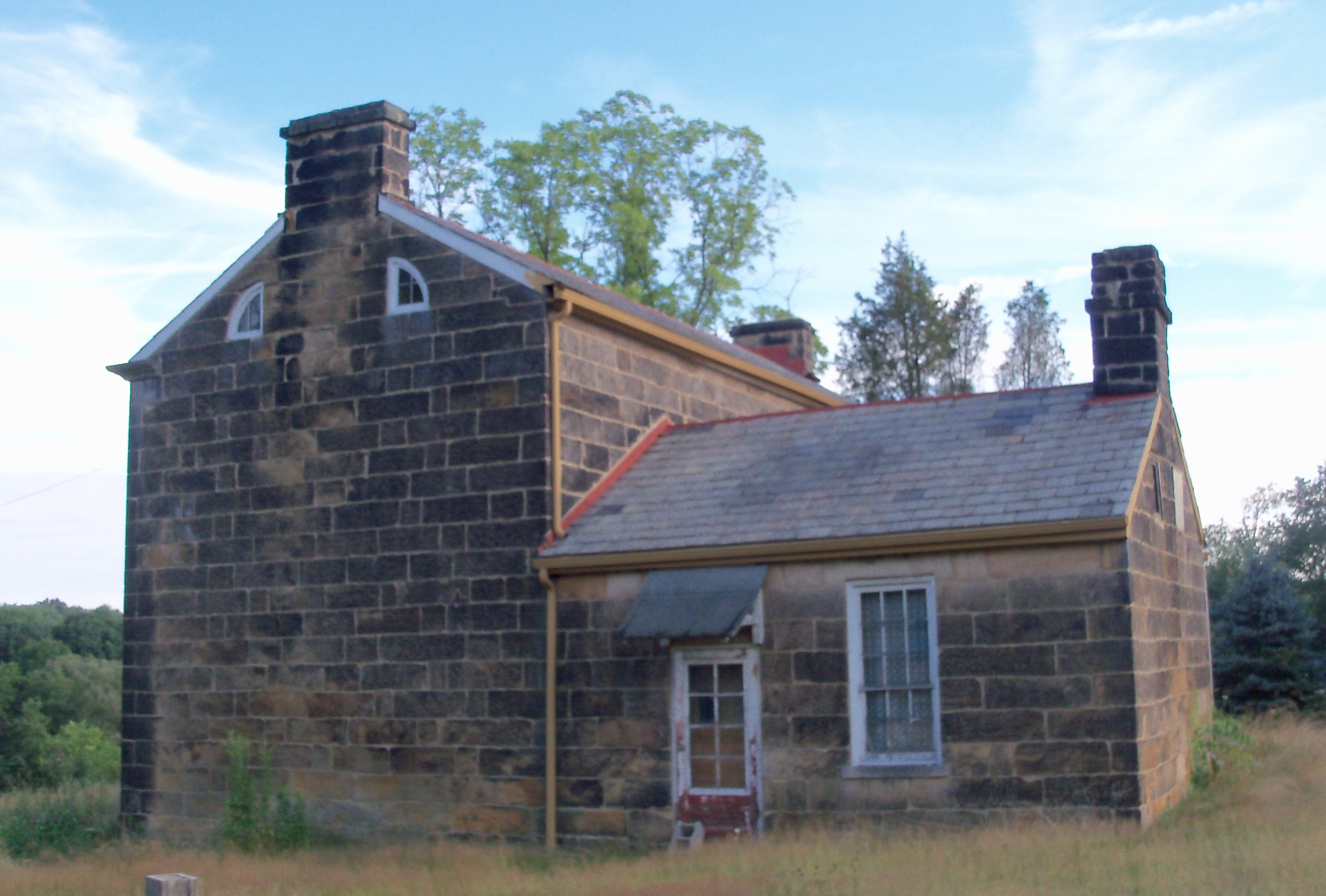
- Daniel McBean Farmstead
- Location: 18709 Fife Coal Rd., Wellsville, Ohio
- Nearest city: Wellsville, Ohio
- Coordinates: 40°37′48″N 80°42′35″W
- Area: 2.5 acres (1.0 ha)
- Built: 1846
- Architect: Daniel McKay, A. McKay
- Architectural style: Federal, I-house
- NRHP reference No.: 05001518
- Added to NRHP: January 12, 2005

The Daniel McBean Farmstead (also known as the Eddie Murphy House) is a historic home in Wellsville, Ohio. The farmstead was built in 1846 by Daniel McKay and was added to the National Register of Historic Places on January 12, 2005.
