= Ross Township, Jefferson County, Ohio =

Township in Ohio, US

- Township
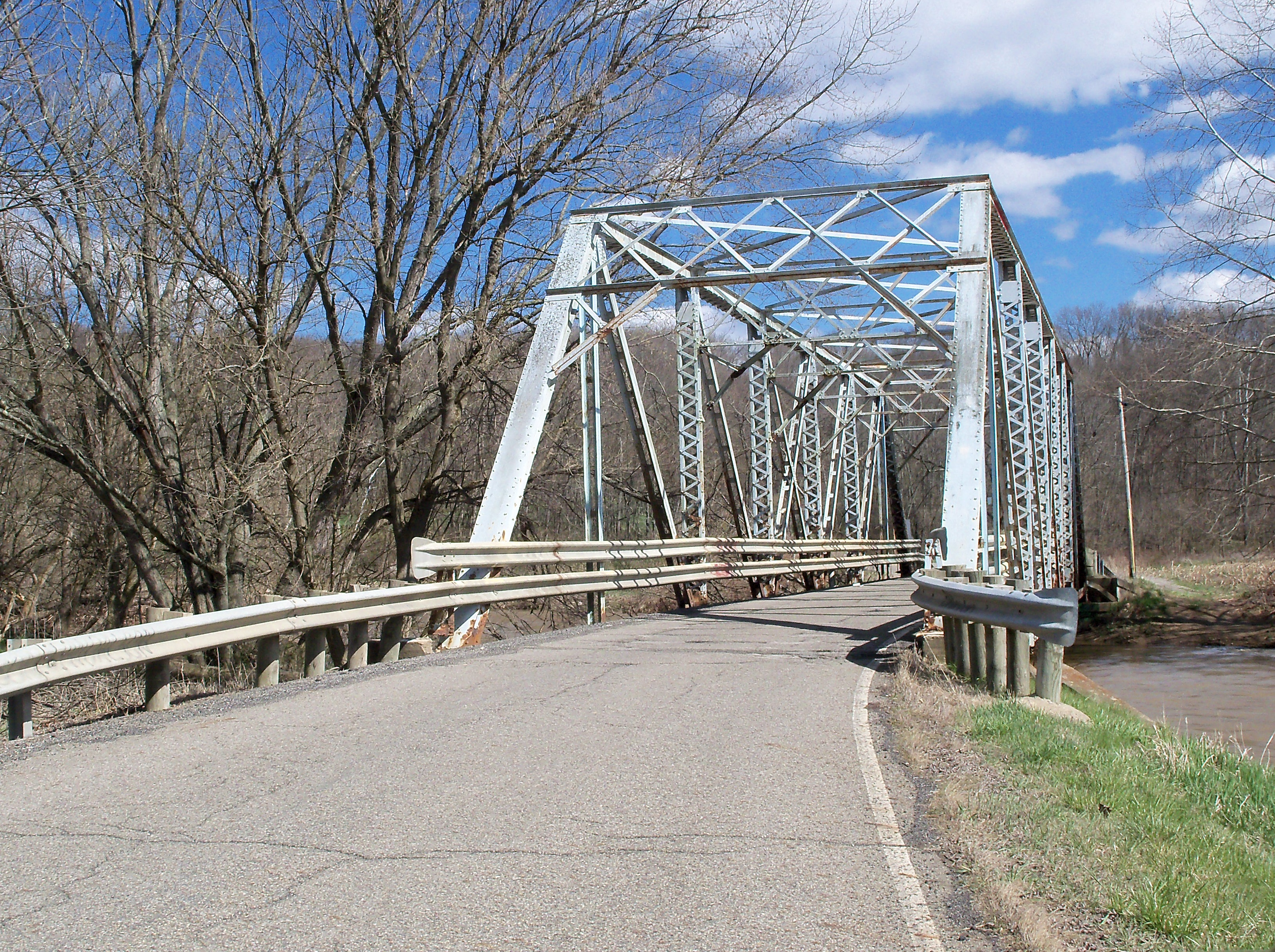
- One lane bridge over Yellow Creek on County Road 53

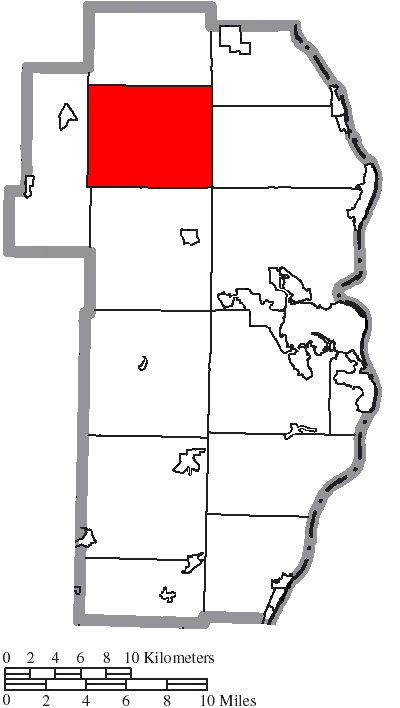
- Location of Ross Township in Jefferson County
- Coordinates: 40°29′56″N 80°47′42″W
- Country: United States
- State: Ohio
- County: Jefferson

Area
  - Total: 30.9 sq mi (80.1 km^{2})
  - Land: 30.9 sq mi (80.0 km^{2})
  - Water: 0.039 sq mi (0.1 km^{2})
- Elevation: 1,043 ft (318 m)

Population (2020)
  - Total: 655
  - Density: 21.2/sq mi (8.19/km^{2})
- Time zone: UTC-5 (Eastern (EST))
  - Summer (DST): UTC-4 (EDT)
- FIPS code: 39-68644
- GNIS feature ID: 1086381

Ross Township is one of the fourteen townships of Jefferson County, Ohio, United States. The 2020 census found 655 people in the township.

== Geography ==
Located in the northwestern part of the county, it borders the following townships:

- Brush Creek Township - north
- Saline Township - northeast
- Knox Township - east
- Island Creek Township - southeast corner
- Salem Township - south
- Springfield Township - west

No municipalities are located in Ross Township.

== Name and history ==
Ross Township was founded in 1812. It was named for James Ross.

Statewide, other Ross Townships are located in Butler and Greene counties.

== Government ==
The township is governed by a three-member board of trustees, who are elected in November of odd-numbered years to a four-year term beginning on the following January 1. Two are elected in the year after the presidential election and one is elected in the year before it. There is also an elected township fiscal officer, who serves a four-year term beginning on April 1 of the year after the election, which is held in November of the year before the presidential election. Vacancies in the fiscal officership or on the board of trustees are filled by the remaining trustees.
