= Arnold, Brooke County, West Virginia =

Unincorporated community in West Virginia, United States

Arnold, West Virginia
- Unincorporated community
- Location within the state of West Virginia Arnold (the United States)
- Coordinates: 40°17′55″N 80°34′48″W
- Country: United States
- State: West Virginia
- County: Brooke
- Time zone: UTC-5 (Eastern (EST))
  - Summer (DST): UTC-4 (EDT)
- GNIS feature ID: 1553748

Arnold is an unincorporated community on Cross Creek in Brooke County, West Virginia, United States.
