= Follansbee, West Virginia =

City in West Virginia, US

- City
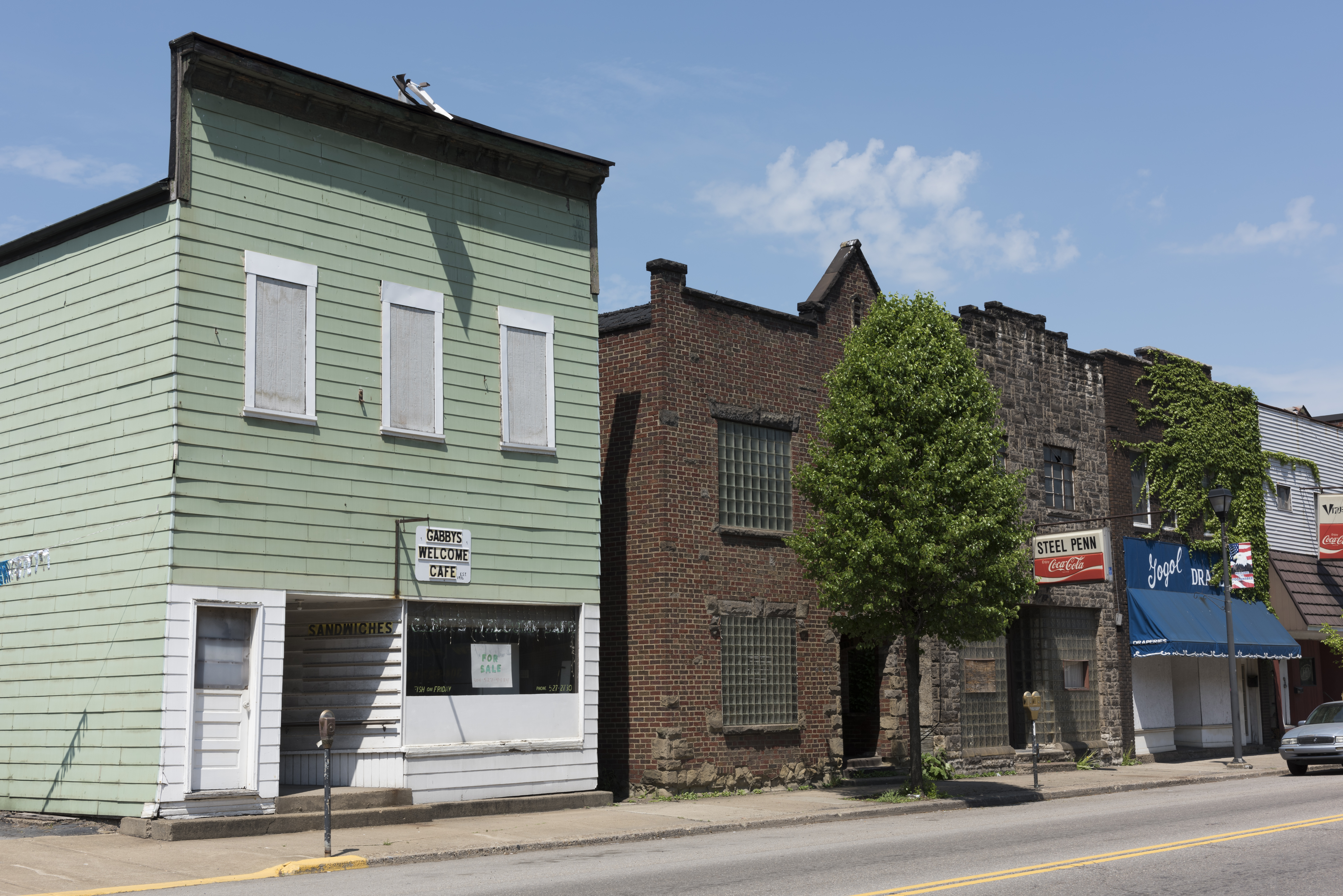
- A commercial block in Follansbee

- Logo
- Interactive map of Follansbee, West Virginia
- Location within West Virginia Location within the United States
- Coordinates: 40°19′59″N 80°35′39″W
- Country: United States
- State: West Virginia
- County: Brooke
- Incorporated: 1906

Government
  - Mayor: Scott McMahon
  - City Manager: Christine Manack-Stover

Area
  - Total: 2.09 sq mi (5.41 km^{2})
  - Land: 1.84 sq mi (4.77 km^{2})
  - Water: 0.25 sq mi (0.64 km^{2})
- Elevation: 669 ft (204 m)

Population (2020)
  - Total: 2,848
  - Estimate (2021): 2,799
  - Density: 1,470.4/sq mi (567.71/km^{2})
- Time zone: UTC-5 (Eastern (EST))
  - Summer (DST): UTC-4 (EDT)
- ZIP code: 26037
- Area code: 304
- FIPS code: 54-28204
- GNIS feature ID: 1554480
- Website: Official website

Follansbee is a city in Brooke County, West Virginia, United States, located along the Ohio River. The population was 2,853 at the 2020 census, a decrease from 2,986 at the 2010 census. It is part of the Weirton–Steubenville metropolitan area.

== History ==
The city was named after the Follansbee brothers, the proprietors of a local steel mill. Follansbee was incorporated in 1906.

== Geography ==
Follansbee is located at 40°19′59″N 80°35′39″W (40.332919, -80.594048).

According to the United States Census Bureau, the city has a total area of 2.09 square miles (5.41 km^{2}), of which 1.84 square miles (4.77 km^{2}) is land and 0.25 square miles (0.65 km^{2}) is water.

== Demographics ==
Historical population
Census	Pop.	Note	%±
1910	2,031		—
1920	3,135		54.4%
1930	4,841		54.4%
1940	4,834		−0.1%
1950	4,435		−8.3%
1960	4,052		−8.6%
1970	3,883		−4.2%
1980	3,994		2.9%
1990	3,339		−16.4%
2000	3,115		−6.7%
2010	2,986		−4.1%
2020	2,848		−4.6%
2021 (est.)	2,799		−1.7%
U.S. Decennial Census

=== 2020 census ===
As of the 2020 census, Follansbee had a population of 2,848. The median age was 46.3 years. 18.5% of residents were under the age of 18 and 23.0% of residents were 65 years of age or older. For every 100 females there were 97.8 males, and for every 100 females age 18 and over there were 94.7 males age 18 and over.

99.3% of residents lived in urban areas, while 0.7% lived in rural areas.

There were 1,272 households in Follansbee, of which 25.5% had children under the age of 18 living in them. Of all households, 43.5% were married-couple households, 20.4% were households with a male householder and no spouse or partner present, and 28.5% were households with a female householder and no spouse or partner present. About 32.0% of all households were made up of individuals and 15.8% had someone living alone who was 65 years of age or older.

There were 1,425 housing units, of which 10.7% were vacant. The homeowner vacancy rate was 2.0% and the rental vacancy rate was 9.7%.

Racial composition as of the 2020 census
Race	Number	Percent
White	2,670	93.8%
Black or African American	25	0.9%
American Indian and Alaska Native	1	0.0%
Asian	0	0.0%
Native Hawaiian and Other Pacific Islander	0	0.0%
Some other race	7	0.2%
Two or more races	145	5.1%
Hispanic or Latino (of any race)	35	1.2%

=== 2010 census ===
As of the census of 2010, there were 2,986 people, 1,302 households, and 842 families living in the city. The population density was 1,622.8 inhabitants per square mile (626.6/km^{2}). There were 1,432 housing units at an average density of 778.3 per square mile (300.5/km^{2}). The racial makeup of the city was 97.6% White, 0.3% African American, 0.1% Native American, 0.2% Asian, 0.2% from other races, and 1.5% from two or more races. Hispanic or Latino of any race were 0.67% of the population.

There were 1,302 households, of which 27.0% had children under the age of 18 living with them, 46.1% were married couples living together, 13.1% had a female householder with no husband present, 5.5% had a male householder with no wife present, and 35.3% were non-families. 30.6% of all households were made up of individuals, and 14.1% had someone living alone who was 65 years of age or older. The average household size was 2.29 and the average family size was 2.85.

The median age in the city was 44.6 years. 20.7% of residents were under the age of 18; 7.7% were between the ages of 18 and 24; 22.1% were from 25 to 44; 30.9% were from 45 to 64; and 18.7% were 65 years of age or older. The gender makeup of the city was 47.4% male and 52.6% female.

=== 2000 census ===
As of the census of 2000, there were 3,115 people, 1,340 households, and 911 families living in the city. The population density was 1,757.9 people per square mile (679.5/km^{2}). There were 1,453 housing units at an average density of 820.0 per square mile (317.0/km^{2}). The racial makeup of the city was 98.97% White, 0.06% African American, 0.06% Native American, 0.32% Asian, 0.03% from other races, and 0.55% from two or more races. Hispanic or Latino of any race were 0.26% of the population.

There were 1,340 households, out of which 26.4% had children under the age of 18 living with them, 50.6% were married couples living together, 13.0% had a female householder with no husband present, and 32.0% were non-families. 29.2% of all households were made up of individuals, and 16.3% had someone living alone who was 65 years of age or older. The average household size was 2.32 and the average family size was 2.86.

In the city the age distribution of the population shows 21.3% under the age of 18, 7.4% from 18 to 24, 24.8% from 25 to 44, 26.2% from 45 to 64, and 20.4% who were 65 years of age or older. The median age was 43 years. For every 100 females, there were 90.1 males. For every 100 females age 18 and over, there were 88.0 males.

The median income for a household in the city was $30,818, and the median income for a family was $37,679. Males had a median income of $36,063 versus $19,554 for females. The per capita income for the city was $16,824. About 11.6% of families and 12.8% of the population were below the poverty line, including 21.4% of those under age 18 and 8.2% of those age 65 or over.

== See also ==
- List of cities and towns along the Ohio River

== Notable people ==
- Glenn Davis, Olympic hurdler and sprinter who won a total of three gold medals in the 1956 and 1960 Olympic Games (born in Follansbee)
- Anthony di Bonaventura, U.S. concert pianist and pedagogue
- Lou Holtz, former NCAA and NFL football coach (born in Follansbee)
- Rich Thomaselli, former NFL Running back (born in Follansbee)
