= First Creek =

First Creek may refer to:

- First Creek (Adelaide), a tributary of the River Torrens in the eastern suburbs of Adelaide, South Australia
- First Creek (Gasconade River), a stream in Missouri
- First Creek (Second Creek), a stream in Missouri
- First Creek (St. Francis River), a stream in Missouri
- First Creek (Pocatalico River), a stream in West Virginia
