= Kincheloe =

Kincheloe may refer to:

== Places ==
In the United States:

- Kincheloe Air Force Base, a former U.S. Air Force Base in the Upper Peninsula of Michigan
- Kincheloe, Michigan, an unincorporated community near the former Air Force Base
- Kincheloe, West Virginia, an unincorporated community
- Kincheloe Creek, a creek in West Virginia

== People ==
- Kincheloe (surname)
