= List of rivers of West Virginia =

This is a list of rivers in the U.S. state of West Virginia.

List of West Virginia rivers includes streams formally designated as rivers. There are also smaller streams (i.e., branches, creeks, drains, forks, licks, runs, etc.) in the state. Exclusive of major tributaries, there are about 46 named rivers in West Virginia. Though relatively few in number, rivers have traditionally provided easy avenues of transportation through the rough terrain of the Mountain State, first by Native Americans and later by European settlers. Even today, the larger rivers transport large volumes of commercial goods, while the smaller ones provide recreational opportunities such as canoeing, fishing, swimming, and white-water rafting.

== By tributary ==
  - Ohio River
    - Monongahela River
      - Tygart Valley River
        - Files Creek
        - Leading Creek
        - Middle Fork River
        - Buckhannon River
          - Left Fork Buckhannon River
          - Right Fork Buckhannon River
          - Indian Camp Run
          - Herods Run
          - French Creek
        - Sandy Creek
        - Three Fork Creek
      - West Fork River
        - Sand Fork
          - Sammy Run
        - Skin Creek
          - Wheeler Fork
          - Hughes Fork
        - Stonecoal Creek
          - Right Fork Stonecoal Creek
            - Pigeonroost Run
        - Freemans Creek
          - Geelick Run
        - Kincheloe Creek
        - Hackers Creek
        - Elk Creek
        - Simpson Creek
          - Ann Run stream
        - Tenmile Creek
          - Little Tenmile Creek
        - Bingamon Creek
        - Booths Creek
        - Carrion Run
        - Cap Run
      - Buffalo Creek
        - Pyles Fork
      - Paw Paw Creek
        - Panther Lick Run
      - Deckers Creek
      - Cheat River
        - Shavers Fork
        - Black Fork
          - Dry Fork
            - Gandy Creek
            - Tory Camp Run
            - Red Creek
            - Laurel Fork
            - Glady Fork
            - Otter Creek
          - Blackwater River
            - Little Blackwater River
            - Beaver Creek
            - North Fork Blackwater River
        - Horseshoe Run
        - Saltlick Creek
        - Muddy Creek
        - Big Sandy Creek
          - Little Sandy Creek (Big Sandy Creek tributary), in Pennsylvania and West Virginia
          - Little Sandy Creek (West Virginia)
      - Dunkard Creek
        - Dooley Run
      - Youghiogheny River
    - Muchmores Run
    - Tomlinson Run
      - Whiteoak Run
      - North Fork Tomlinson Run
        - Mercer Run
      - South Fork Tomlinson Run
    - Deep Gut Run
    - Hardin Run
      - Langfitt Run
    - Holbert Run
    - Kings Creek
      - Turkeyfoot Run
      - North Fork Kings Creek
        - Lawrence Run
      - Lick Run
    - Harmon Creek
      - Sappingtons Run
      - Alexanders Run
      - Mechling Run
    - Cross Creek
      - Bosley Run
      - Ebenezer Run
      - North Potrock Run
      - Potrock Run
      - Scott Run
        - Parmar Run
    - Buffalo Creek
      - Painters Run
      - Greens Run
      - Titt Run
      - Pierce Run
      - Kimlin Run
      - Grog Run
      - Mingo Run
      - Hukill Run
      - Hogtan Run
      - Stotts Run
      - Logan Run
      - Castleman Run
        - Longs Run
      - Cascade Run
      - Camp Run
      - Sugarcamp Run
    - Short Creek
      - Girty Run
        - Newlands Run
      - Waddles Run
      - North Fork Short Creek
    - Glenns Run
    - Wheeling Creek
      - Long Run
      - Enlow Fork
      - Dunkard Fork
      - Little Wheeling Creek
    - Boggs Run
    - Grave Creek
    - Fish Creek
      - Pennsylvania Fork Fish Creek
      - West Virginia Fork Fish Creek
        - Long Drain
          - Harker Run
      - Maggoty Run
    - Fishing Creek
      - North Fork Fishing Creek
      - South Fork Fishing Creek
        - Arches Fork
      - Piney Fork
      - Crow Run
      - Little Fishing Creek
      - Doolin Run
    - Middle Island Creek
      - Buckeye Creek
      - Meathouse Fork
        - Indian Fork
        - Toms Fork
      - Nutter Fork
        - Gorby Run
      - Arnold Creek
      - McElroy Creek
        - Flint Run
      - Indian Creek
      - Point Pleasant Creek
        - Elk Fork
      - Sancho Creek
      - Sugar Creek
        - Bills Creek
      - McKim Creek
    - Little Kanawha River
      - Right Fork Little Kanawha River
      - Saltlick Creek
      - Sand Fork
      - Leading Creek
        - Fink Creek
        - Cove Creek
      - Cedar Creek
      - Steer Creek
        - Left Fork Steer Creek
        - Right Fork Steer Creek
      - West Fork Little Kanawha River
        - Cook Run
        - Henry Fork
      - Spring Creek
      - Reedy Creek
      - Hughes River
        - North Fork Hughes River
          - Bonds Creek
            - Hushers Run
              - Hitchcock Run
          - Lynncamp Run
            - Buzzard Run
        - South Fork Hughes River
          - Middle Fork
          - Turtle Run
          - Spruce Creek
          - Indian Creek (South Fork Hughes River tributary)
            - Little Indian Run
        - Goose Creek
          - Layfields Run
      - Slate Creek
      - Walker Creek
      - Stillwell Creek
        - Beeson Run
      - Tygart Creek
      - Worthington Creek
    - Lee Creek
    - Pond Creek
    - Sandy Creek
      - Left Fork Sandy Creek
      - Right Fork Sandy Creek
    - Mill Creek
      - Little Mill Creek
        - Frozencamp Creek
      - Elk Fork
      - Tug Fork (Mill Creek tributary)
    - Kanawha River
      - New River
        - East River
        - Indian Creek
          - Stinking Lick Creek
        - Bluestone River
          - Little Bluestone River
          - Brush Creek
          - Crane Creek
            - Belcher Branch
        - Greenbrier River
          - East Fork Greenbrier River
            - Little River (East Fork Greenbrier River tributary)
          - West Fork Greenbrier River
            - Little River (West Fork Greenbrier River tributary)
              - Span Oak Run
          - Leatherbark Run
          - Deer Creek
          - Sitlington Creek
          - Knapp Creek
          - Spring Creek
          - Anthony Creek
          - Howard Creek
          - Second Creek
          - Muddy Creek
        - Glade Creek
        - Piney Creek
          - Beaver Creek
          - Crab Orchard Creek
            - Bonnett's Run
      - Gauley River
        - Williams River
        - Cranberry River
          - North Fork Cranberry River
          - South Fork Cranberry River
        - Cherry River
          - North Fork Cherry River
          - South Fork Cherry River
          - Laurel Creek
        - Panther Creek
          - Geho Run
        - Big Beaver Creek
        - Muddlety Creek
        - Hominy Creek
        - Meadow River
          - Big Clear Creek
          - Anglins Creek
        - Twentymile Creek
      - Loop Creek
        - Carter Branch
      - Armstrong Creek
      - Smithers Creek
      - Paint Creek
        - Skitter Creek
      - Kellys Creek
      - Cabin Creek
      - Witcher Creek
      - Lens Creek
      - Campbells Creek
      - Elk River
        - Baltimore Run
        - Back Fork Elk River
          - Sugar Creek
        - Laurel Creek
        - Holly River
          - Left Fork Holly River
          - Right Fork Holly River
            - Desert Fork
            - Grassy Creek
        - Birch River
          - Little Birch River
          - Barnet Run
        - Buffalo Creek
          - Lilly Fork
            - Beech Fork
              - Libertybowl Branch
        - Big Sandy Creek
        - Blue Creek
        - Little Sandy Creek
      - Twomile Creek
      - Davis Creek
      - Upton Creek
      - Coal River
        - Big Coal River
          - Clear Fork
          - Marsh Fork
            - Hazy Creek
          - Laurel Creek
        - Little Coal River
          - Spruce Fork
            - Spruce Laurel Fork
          - Pond Fork
          - Tackett Creek
      - Pocatalico River
        - First Creek
        - Tupper Creek
        - Derrick Creek
        - Frog Creek
        - Heizer Creek
      - Hurricane Creek
      - Eighteenmile Creek (Kanawha River tributary)
      - Thirteenmile Creek
    - Sixteenmile Creek
    - Eighteenmile Creek (Ohio River tributary)
    - Guyandotte River
      - Winding Gulf
      - Slab Fork
      - Barkers Creek
      - Pinnacle Creek
      - Indian Creek
      - Clear Fork
        - Laurel Fork
      - Little Huff Creek
      - Huff Creek
      - Buffalo Creek
      - Island Creek
        - Copperas Mine Fork
      - Mud River
        - Big Creek
        - Sycamore Creek
        - Trace Creek
        - Big Twomile Creek
        - Trace Fork
          - Joe's Creek
          - Hayzlett Fork
    - Twelvepole Creek
      - East Fork Twelvepole Creek
      - West Fork Twelvepole Creek
      - Beech Fork
    - Big Sandy River
      - Tug Fork
        - Elkhorn Creek
        - Dry Fork
        - Panther Creek
        - Fourpole Creek
        - Pigeon Creek
          - Rockhouse Fork
    - Carpenter Run

=== Chesapeake Bay ===
- James River (VA)
  - Jackson River (VA)
    - Potts Creek
  - Cowpasture River (VA)
    - Bullpasture River
- Potomac River
  - South Branch Potomac River
    - North Fork South Branch Potomac River
      - Laurel Fork
      - Big Run (North Fork South Branch Potomac River tributary)
      - Mill Creek (North Fork South Branch Potomac River tributary)
      - Seneca Creek
    - Lunice Creek
    - South Fork South Branch Potomac River
      - Little Fork
      - Kettle Creek
    - Mill Run
    - Mill Creek (South Branch Potomac River tributary)
    - Big Run (South Branch Potomac River tributary)
    - Buffalo Creek
  - North Branch Potomac River
    - Stony River
    - Abram Creek
    - New Creek
    - Limestone Run
    - Patterson Creek
      - Mill Creek (Patterson Creek tributary)
    - Dans Run
    - Green Spring Run
  - Little Cacapon River
    - North Fork Little Cacapon River
    - South Fork Little Cacapon River
  - Cacapon River
    - Lost River
    - Trout Run
    - Capon Springs Run
    - Mill Branch
    - Dillons Run
    - Edwards Run
    - North River
      - Grassy Lick Run
      - Tearcoat Creek
        - Bearwallow Creek
  - Sir Johns Run
  - Warm Spring Run
  - Sleepy Creek
    - Meadow Branch
  - Cherry Run
  - Back Creek
    - Tilhance Creek
  - Opequon Creek
    - Mill Creek
    - Middle Creek
    - Tuscarora Creek
  - Shenandoah River

== Alphabetically ==
- Abram Creek
- Alum Creek (Coal River tributary)
- Alum Creek (Tug Fork tributary)
- Anthony Creek
- Armstrong Creek
- Arnold Creek
- Back Creek
- Back Fork Elk River
- Baltimore Run
- Barkers Creek
- Bearwallow Creek
- Beaver Creek (Blackwater River tributary)
- Beaver Creek (Piney Creek tributary)
- Beech Fork
- Beeson Run
- Big Beaver Creek (Gauley River tributary)
- Big Clear Creek
- Big Coal River
- Big Cub Creek
- Big Run (North Fork South Branch Potomac River tributary)
- Big Run (South Branch Potomac River tributary)
- Big Sandy Creek (Cheat River tributary)
- Big Sandy Creek (Elk River tributary)
- Big Sandy River
- Bingamon Creek
- Birch River
- Black Fork
- Blackwater River
- Blue Creek
- Bluestone River
- Bonds Creek
- Bonnett's Run
- Booths Creek
- Buckeye Creek
- Buckhannon River
- Buffalo Creek (Elk River tributary, West Virginia)
- Buffalo Creek (Guyandotte River tributary)
- Buffalo Creek (Monongahela River tributary)
- Buffalo Creek (Ohio River tributary)
- Buffalo Creek (South Branch Potomac River tributary)
- Cabin Creek
- Cacapon River
- Campbells Creek
- Capon Springs Run
- Cedar Creek
- Cheat River
- Cherry River
- Cherry Run
- Clear Fork (Big Coal River tributary)
- Clear Fork (Guyandotte River tributary)
- Coal River
- Copperas Mine Fork
- Cow Run
- Cove Creek
- Crab Orchard Creek
- Cranberry River
- Cross Creek
- Crow Run
- Dans Run
- Davis Creek
- Deckers Creek
- Deer Creek
- Den Run
- Desert Fork
- Dillons Run
- Dry Fork (Cheat River tributary)
- Dry Fork (Tug Fork tributary)
- Dunkard Creek
- Dunkard Fork
- Gamble Run
- East Fork Greenbrier River
- Goosepen Run
- East Fork Twelvepole Creek
- East River
- Edwards Run
- Eighteenmile Creek (Kanawha River tributary)
- Eighteenmile Creek (Ohio River tributary)
- Elk Creek
- Elk Fork (Mill Creek tributary)
- Elk Fork (Point Pleasant Creek tributary)
- Elk River
- Elkhorn Creek
- Enlow Fork
- Files Creek
- Fink Creek
- First Creek
- Fish Creek
- Fishing Creek
- Flint Run
- Fourpole Creek
- French Creek
- Frog Creek
- Frozencamp Creek
- Gandy Creek
- Gauley River
- Geelick Run
- Glade Creek
- Glady Fork
- Gorby Run
- Grassy Creek
- Grassy Lick Run
- Grave Creek
- Green Spring Run
- Greenbrier River
- Guyandotte River
- Hackers Creek
- Harker Run
- Hazy Creek
- Heizer Creek
- Henry Branch
- Henry Fork
- Herods Run
- Hitchcock Run
- Holly River
- Hominy Creek
- Horseshoe Run
- Hospital Run
- Howard Creek
- Huff Creek
- Hughes Fork
- Hughes River
- Hurricane Creek
- Hushers Run
- Indian Creek (Guyandotte River tributary)
- Indian Creek (Middle Island Creek tributary)
- Indian Creek (New River tributary)
- Indian Creek (South Fork Hughes River tributary)
- Indian Fork
- Island Creek
- Kanawha River
- Kellys Creek
- Kettle Creek
- Kincheloe Creek
- Kings Creek
- Knapp Creek
- Laurel Creek (Big Coal River tributary)
- Laurel Creek (Cherry River tributary)
- Laurel Creek (Elk River tributary)
- Laurel Fork (Cheat River tributary)
- Laurel Fork (Clear Fork Guyandotte River tributary)
- Laurel Fork (North Fork South Branch Potomac River tributary)
- Leading Creek (Little Kanawha River tributary)
- Leading Creek (Tygart Valley River tributary)
- Leatherbark Run
- Lee Creek
- Left Fork Buckhannon River
- Left Fork Holly River
- Left Fork Sandy Creek
- Left Fork Steer Creek
- Lens Creek
- Limestone Run
- Little Birch River
- Little Blackwater River
- Little Bluestone River
- Little Cacapon River
- Little Coal River
- Little Fishing Creek
- Little Fork
- Little Huff Creek
- Little Kanawha River
- Little Mill Creek
- Little River (East Fork Greenbrier River tributary)
- Little River (West Fork Greenbrier River tributary)
- Little Sandy Creek (Big Sandy Creek tributary), in Pennsylvania and West Virginia
- Little Sandy Creek (Elk River tributary)
- Little Sandy Creek (West Virginia), tributary of Big Sandy Creek entirely in West Virginia
- Little Tenmile Creek
- Little Wheeling Creek
- Long Drain
- Loop Creek
- Lost River
- Lunice Creek
- Mahogany Run: a stream in Monongalia County, West Virginia, United States. It is a tributary to Scott Run. According to onomastician Hamill Kenny, Mahogany Run likely was named after the mahogany (or mahogany-like) timber in the area.
- Marsh Fork
- McElroy Creek
- McKim Creek
- McKown Creek
- Meadow Branch
- Meadow River
- Meathouse Fork
- Middle Creek
- Middle Fork (South Fork Hughes River tributary)
- Middle Fork River, Tygart Valley River tributary
- Middle Island Creek
- Mill Branch
- Mill Creek (North Fork South Branch Potomac River tributary)
- Mill Creek (Opequon Creek tributary)
- Mill Creek (Patterson Creek tributary)
- Mill Creek (South Branch Potomac River tributary)
- Mill Creek (western West Virginia)
- Mill Run
- Miracle Run
- Monongahela River
- Mud River
- Muddlety Creek
- Muddy Creek (Cheat River tributary)
- Muddy Creek (Greenbrier River tributary)
- Negro Run (West Virginia)
- New Creek
- New River
- North Branch Potomac River
- North Fork Blackwater River
- North Fork Cherry River
- North Fork Cranberry River
- North Fork Fishing Creek
- North Fork Hughes River
- North Fork Little Cacapon River
- North Fork Short Creek
- North Fork South Branch Potomac River
- North River
- Nutter Fork
- Ohio River
- Opequon Creek
- Otter Creek
- Paint Creek
- Panther Creek
- Panther Lick Run
- Patterson Creek
- Paw Paw Creek
- Pennsylvania Fork Fish Creek
- Pigeon Creek
- Piney Creek
- Piney Fork
- Pinnacle Creek
- Pocatalico River
- Point Pleasant Creek
- Pond Creek
- Pond Fork
- Potomac River
- Potts Creek
- Pyles Fork
- Red Creek
- Reedy Creek
- Right Fork Buckhannon River
- Right Fork Holly River
- Right Fork Little Kanawha River
- Right Fork Sandy Creek
- Right Fork Steer Creek
- Rockhouse Fork
- Saltlick Creek (Cheat River tributary)
- Saltlick Creek (Little Kanawha River tributary)
- Sammy Run
- Sancho Creek
- Sand Fork
- Sandy Creek (Ohio River tributary)
- Sandy Creek (Tygart Valley River tributary)
- Second Creek
- Seneca Creek
- Shavers Fork
- Shenandoah River
- Short Creek
- Simpson Creek
- Sir Johns Run
- Sitlington Creek
- Sixteenmile Creek
- Skin Creek
- Skitter Creek
- Slab Fork
- Sleepy Creek
- Smithers Creek
- Smoky Drain
- South Branch Potomac River
- South Fork Cherry River
- South Fork Cranberry River
- South Fork Fishing Creek
- South Fork Hughes River
- South Fork Little Cacapon River
- South Fork South Branch Potomac River
- Span Oak Run
- Spring Creek (Greenbrier River tributary)
- Spring Creek (Little Kanawha River tributary)
- Spruce Creek
- Spruce Fork
- Spruce Laurel Fork
- Steer Creek
- Stinking Lick Creek
- Stonecoal Creek
- Stony River
- Sugar Creek (Back Fork Elk River tributary)
- Sugar Creek (Middle Island Creek tributary)
- Tackett Creek
- Tearcoat Creek
- Tenmile Creek
- Thirteenmile Creek
- Three Fork Creek
- Thunderstruck Run
- Tilhance Creek
- Toms Fork
- Tory Camp Run
- Trace Fork
- Trigger Run
- Trout Run
- Tug Fork, tributary of Big Sandy River
- Tug Fork (Mill Creek tributary)
- Tupper Creek
- Tuscarora Creek
- Twelvepole Creek
- Twentymile Creek
- Twomile Creek
- Tygart Creek
- Tygart Valley River
- Upton Creek
- Walker Creek
- Warm Spring Run
- West Fork Greenbrier River
- West Fork Little Kanawha River
- West Fork River
- West Fork Twelvepole Creek
- West Virginia Fork Fish Creek
- Wheeler Fork
- Wheeling Creek
- Whip Run
- Williams River
- Winding Gulf
- Witcher Creek
- Worthington Creek
- Youghiogheny River
- Zebs Creek

== See also ==
- List of rivers in the United States
- Teays River
- List of islands in West Virginia (with islands in rivers)
