= Alum Creek =

Alum Creek may refer to:

== Communities ==
- Alum Creek, Ohio, an unincorporated community
- Alum Creek, Texas, an unincorporated community
- Alum Creek, West Virginia, an unincorporated community

== Streams ==
- Alum Creek (Ohio), a creek in Ohio
  - Alum Creek State Park
- Alum Creek (South Dakota), a stream in South Dakota
- Alum Creek (Cibolo Creek), a creek in Texas
- Alum Creek (Coal River), a stream in West Virginia
- Alum Creek (Tug Fork), a stream in West Virginia

== See also ==
- Alum Fork
