= South Branch Potomac River =

River in United States

South Branch Potomac River Tributary to Potomac River
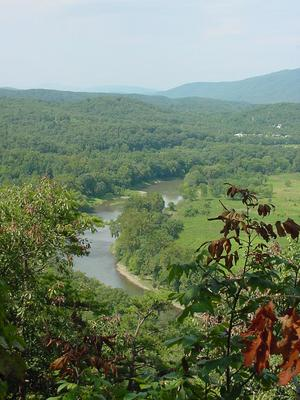
- The South Branch near South Branch Depot, West Virginia

- Location of mouth of South Branch Potomac River

Location
- Country: United States
- State: West Virginia, Maryland, Virginia

Physical characteristics
- Source: Burners Run divide
  - location: about 2 miles east of Hightown, Virginia
  - coordinates: 38°25′30.43″N 079°36′30.13″W
  - elevation: 3,520 ft (1,070 m)
- Mouth: Potomac River
  - location: about 1 mile east of Green Spring, West Virginia
  - coordinates: 39°31′42.33″N 078°35′15.05″W
  - elevation: 525 ft (160 m)
- Length: 113.51 mi (182.68 km)
- Basin size: 1,438.61 square miles (3,726.0 km^{2})
- Discharge
  - location: Potomac River
  - average: 1,535.65 cu ft/s (43.485 m^{3}/s) at mouth with Potomac River

Basin features
- Progression: Potomac River → Chesapeake Bay → Atlantic Ocean
- River system: Potomac River
- Tributaries
  - left: Frank Run, Key Run, Elk Run, East Dry Run, Hammer Run, Moyer Run, Smith Creek, Peters Run, Buffalo Run, Kentuck Run, Reeds Creek, Briggs Run, Dry Hollow, Redman Run, North Fork South Branch Potomac River, Hoglan Run, Lunice Creek, Hutton Run, Anderson Run
  - right: West Strait Creek, Big Run, Liberty Run, Thorn Creek, Propst Run, Conrad Gap Run, Hayes Gap Run, Deer Run, Mill Run, Landes Hollow, Mill Creek, Durgon Creek, South Fork South Branch Potomac River, Fort Run, Stony Run, Sawmill Run, Buffalo Run
- Bridges: VA 640 (x2), Lonesome Trail, VA 25, Dickerson Mountain Road, Gambill Road, US 33, Hammer Homestead Drive, Potomac River Lane, Squire Lane, Schmucker Road, US 220, South Branch Trail, US 220 (x2), Fisher Road, US 48, US 220, US 50, WV 28, Springfield Pike

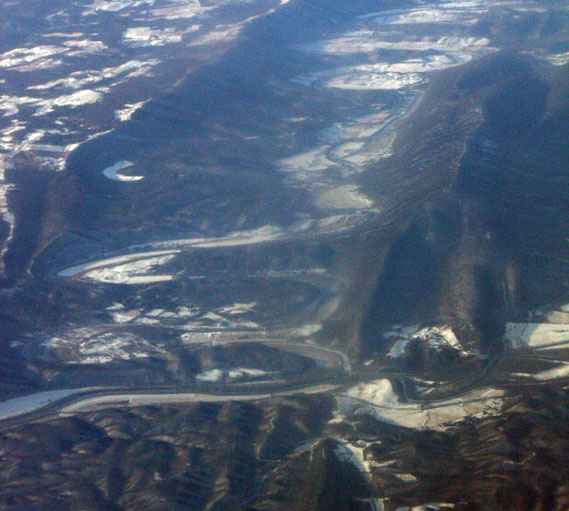
Oblique air photo of the confluence of the North and South Branches near Green Spring, West Virginia. Facing southwest. River Mountain is on the right, and Town Hill is on the left.

The South Branch Potomac River has its headwaters in northwestern Highland County, Virginia, near Hightown along the eastern edge of the Allegheny Front. After a river distance of 139 miles (224 km), the mouth lies east of Green Spring, Hampshire County, West Virginia, where it meets the North Branch Potomac River to form the Potomac.

== Nomenclature ==
The Native Americans of the region, and thus the earliest white settlers, referred to the South Branch Potomac River as the Wappatomaka. Variants throughout the river's history included Wappatomica River, Wapacomo River, Wapocomo River, Wappacoma River, Wappatomaka River, South Branch of Potowmac River, and South Fork Potomac River.

Places settled in the South Branch valley bearing variants of "Wappatomaka" include Wappocomo farm built in 1774 and the unincorporated hamlet of Wappocomo (sometimes spelled Wapocomo) at Hanging Rocks.

== Course ==
The source is northeast of Hightown along U.S. Route 250 on the eastern side of Lantz Mountain (3,934 ft) in Highland County, Virginia. From Hightown, the South Branch is a small meandering stream that flows northeast along Blue Grass Valley Road through the communities of New Hampden and Blue Grass. At Forks of Waters, the South Branch joins with Strait Creek and flows north across the Virginia/West Virginia border into Pendleton County.

The river then travels on a northeastern course along the western side of Jack Mountain (4,045 ft), followed by Sandy Ridge (2,297 ft) along U.S. Route 220. North of the confluence of the South Branch with Smith Creek, the river flows along Town Mountain (2,848 ft) around Franklin at the junction of U.S. Route 220 and U.S. Route 33. After Franklin, the South Branch continues north through the Monongahela National Forest to Upper Tract where it joins with three sizeable streams: Reeds Creek, Mill Run, and Deer Run.

Between Big Mountain (2,582 ft) and Cave Mountain (2,821 ft), the South Branch bends around the Eagle Rock (1,483 ft) outcrop and continues its flow northward into Grant County. Into Grant, the South Branch follows the western side of Cave Mountain through the 20-mile (32 km) long Smoke Hole Canyon, until its confluence with the North Fork at Cabins, where it flows east to Petersburg. At Petersburg, the South Branch Valley Railroad begins, which parallels the river until its mouth at Green Spring.

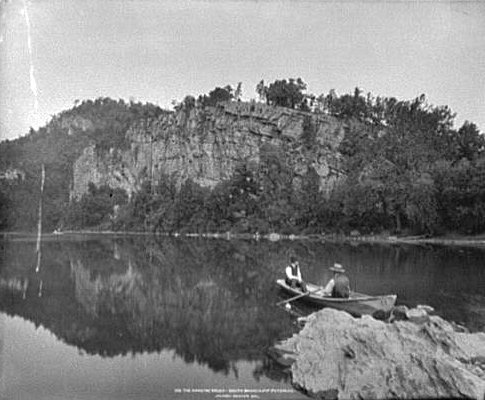
Canoers at Hanging Rocks on the South Branch in the 1890s

In its eastern course from Petersburg into Hardy County, the South Branch becomes more navigable allowing for canoes and smaller river vessels. The river splits and forms a series of large islands while it heads northeast to Moorefield. At Moorefield, the South Branch is joined by the South Fork South Branch Potomac River and runs north to Old Fields where it is fed by Anderson Run and Stony Run.

At McNeill, the South Branch flows into the Trough where it is bound to its west by Mill Creek Mountain (2,119 ft) and to its east by Sawmill Ridge (1,644 ft). The Trough passes into Hampshire County and ends at its confluence with Sawmill Run south of Glebe and Sector.

The South Branch continues north parallel to South Branch River Road (County Route 8) toward Romney with a number of historic plantation farms adjoining it. En route to Romney, the river is fed by Buffalo Run, Mill Run, McDowell Run, and Mill Creek at Vanderlip. The South Branch is traversed by the Northwestern Turnpike (U.S. Route 50) and joined by Sulphur Spring Run where it forms Valley View Island to the west of town.

Flowing north of Romney, the river still follows the eastern side of Mill Creek Mountain until it creates a horseshoe bend at Wappocomo's Hanging Rocks around the George W. Washington plantation, Ridgedale. To the west of Three Churches on the western side of South Branch Mountain, 3,028 feet (923 m), the South Branch creates a series of bends and flows to the northeast by Springfield through Blue's Ford. After two additional horseshoe bends (meanders), the South Branch flows under the old Baltimore and Ohio Railroad mainline between Green Spring and South Branch Depot, and joins the North Branch to form the Potomac.

== Tributaries ==
- Big Run
- Buffalo Creek
- Lunice Creek
- Mill Creek
- Mill Run
- North Fork South Branch Potomac River
  - Mill Creek
  - Seneca Creek
- South Fork South Branch Potomac River
  - Kettle Creek

=== North Fork South Branch Potomac River ===
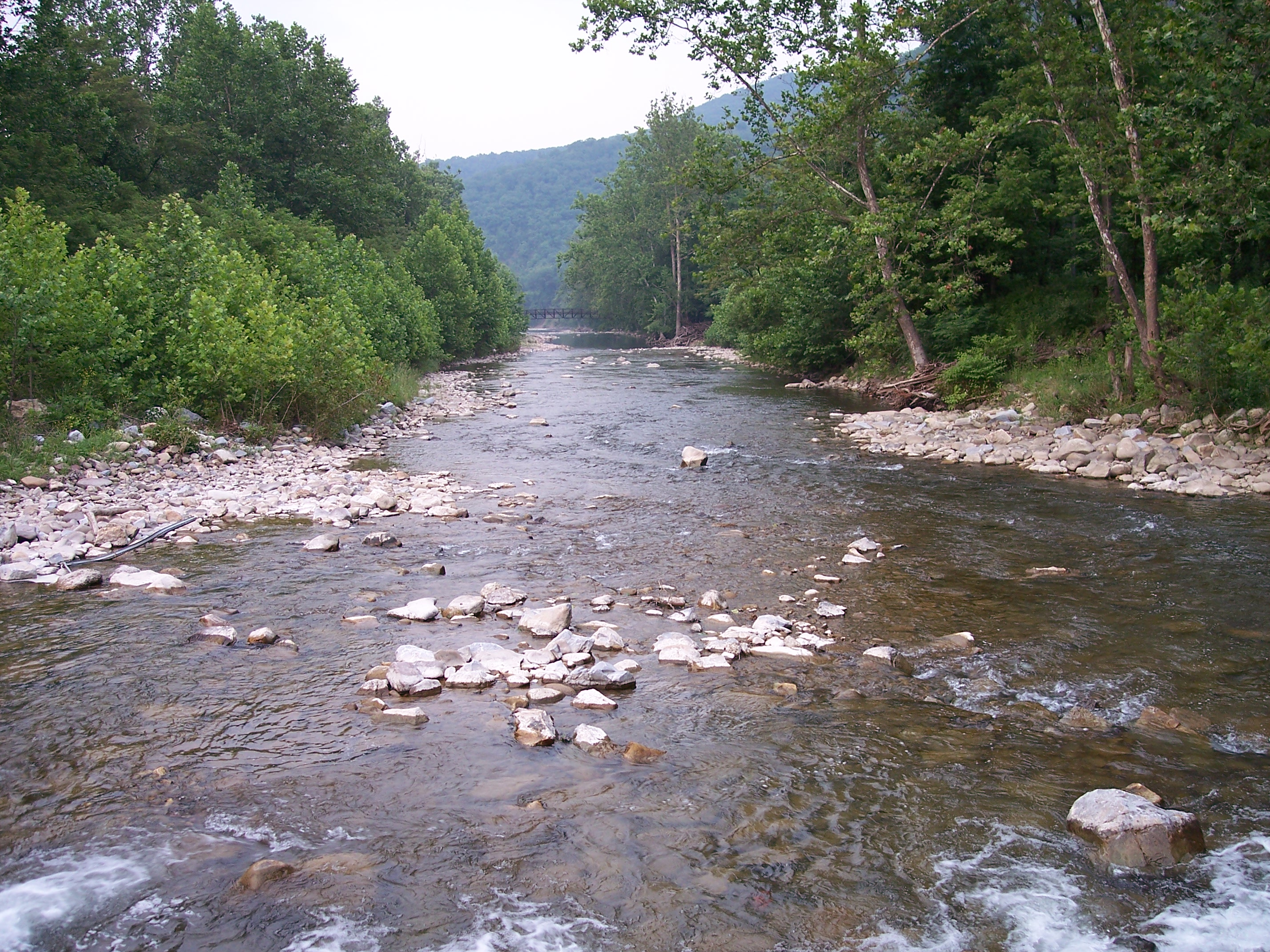
The North Fork South Branch below Seneca Rocks in Pendleton County, West Virginia

The North Fork South Branch Potomac River, 43.6 miles (70.2 km) long, forms just north of the Virginia/West Virginia border in Pendleton County at the confluence of the Laurel Fork and Straight Fork along Big Mountain 3,881 feet (1,183 m). From Circleville, the North Fork flows northeast through Pendleton County between the Fore Knobs 2,949 feet (899 m) to its west and the River Knobs, 2,490 feet (759 m) to its east. At Seneca Rocks, the North Fork is met by Seneca Creek. From Seneca Rocks, the North Fork continues to flow northeast along the western edge of North Fork Mountain 3,389 feet (1033 m) into Grant County. Flowing east through North Fork Gap, the North Fork joins the South Branch Potomac at the town of Cabins, west of Petersburg.

=== South Fork South Branch Potomac River ===
The South Fork South Branch Potomac River, sometimes called the South Fork River, forms just north of U.S. Route 250 in Highland County, Virginia, near Monterey, and flows 68.4 miles (110.1 km) north-northeastward to the South Branch Potomac River at Moorefield in Hardy County, West Virginia. From 1896 to 1929, it was named the Moorefield River by the Board on Geographic Names to avoid confusion with the South Branch.

== See also ==
- List of crossings of the Potomac River § South Branch Potomac River
