= Indian Creek (New River tributary) =

Indian Creek Indian Creek of New River

Location
- Country: United States
- State: West Virginia
- Region: Monroe and Summers Counties

Physical characteristics
- Source
  - location: near Union, West Virginia
  - coordinates: 37°33′55″N 80°33′04″W
- Mouth: New River
  - coordinates: 37°31′04″N 80°50′45″W
  - elevation: 1,421 ft (433 m)

Basin features
- Tributaries
  - left: Hans Creek, Fitz Run, Stinking Lick Creek

Indian Creek, is a tributary of the New River, flowing through the state of West Virginia in the United States.

== Course ==
Indian Creek begins near Union, West Virginia in Monroe County, closely following United States Route 219, West Virginia Route 122, CR-23 and CR-27. Although only being a creek, it is one of Monroe County's main drainage basins. It passes under the Indian Creek Covered Bridge, near Salt Sulphur Springs. After crossing under West Virginia Route 12, it flows over a hole 9–14 feet deep. Then, at about the Summers county line, another hole about this same depth. There are numerous 2–6 feet deep holes in other parts of the creek. Basically all of the waterway in Summers County, is public land. Indian Creek ends its journey close to Crumps Bottom, where it enters New River.

== Environment ==
The West Virginia Division of Natural Resources periodically stocks the creek with trout.

== See also ==
- List of rivers of West Virginia
