= Buzzard Run =

Buzzard Run may refer to:

- Buzzard Run (Missouri), a stream in Missouri
- Buzzard Run (Lynncamp Run), a stream in West Virginia
