= Highland, Ritchie County, West Virginia =

Highland, West Virginia
- Unincorporated community
- Location within West Virginia Location within the United States
- Coordinates: 39°18′13″N 81°03′06″W
- Country: United States
- State: West Virginia
- County: Ritchie
- Elevation: 787 ft (240 m)
- Time zone: UTC-5 (Eastern (EST))
  - Summer (DST): UTC-4 (EDT)
- Area codes: 304 & 681
- GNIS feature ID: 1549741

Highland is an unincorporated community in Ritchie County, West Virginia, United States. Highland is located on Bonds Creek and County Route 1, 4.65 miles (7.48 km) west-northwest of Pennsboro.

The community was named after the Scottish Highlands, the ancestral home of a large share of the first settlers.
