= Hazy (disambiguation) =

Hazy refers to a state of haze.

Hazy may also refer to:

== People ==
- Hazy Osterwald (1922–2012), Swiss bandleader, trumpeter, and vibraphonist
- Steve Hazy (born 1946), American billionaire businessman

== Music ==
- "Hazy", a song by Chloe x Halle from the 2021 album Ungodly Hour
- "Hazy", a 2006 song by Gemma Hayes and Adam Duritz
- "Hazy", a 2021 song by Great Gable
- "Hazy", a 2022 song by Kyle Dion featuring Tkay Maidza

== Other uses ==
- Hazy IPA, a style of beer
- Hazy Creek, stream in the U.S. state of West Virginia

== See also ==
- Haze (disambiguation)
