= Pinnacle Creek =

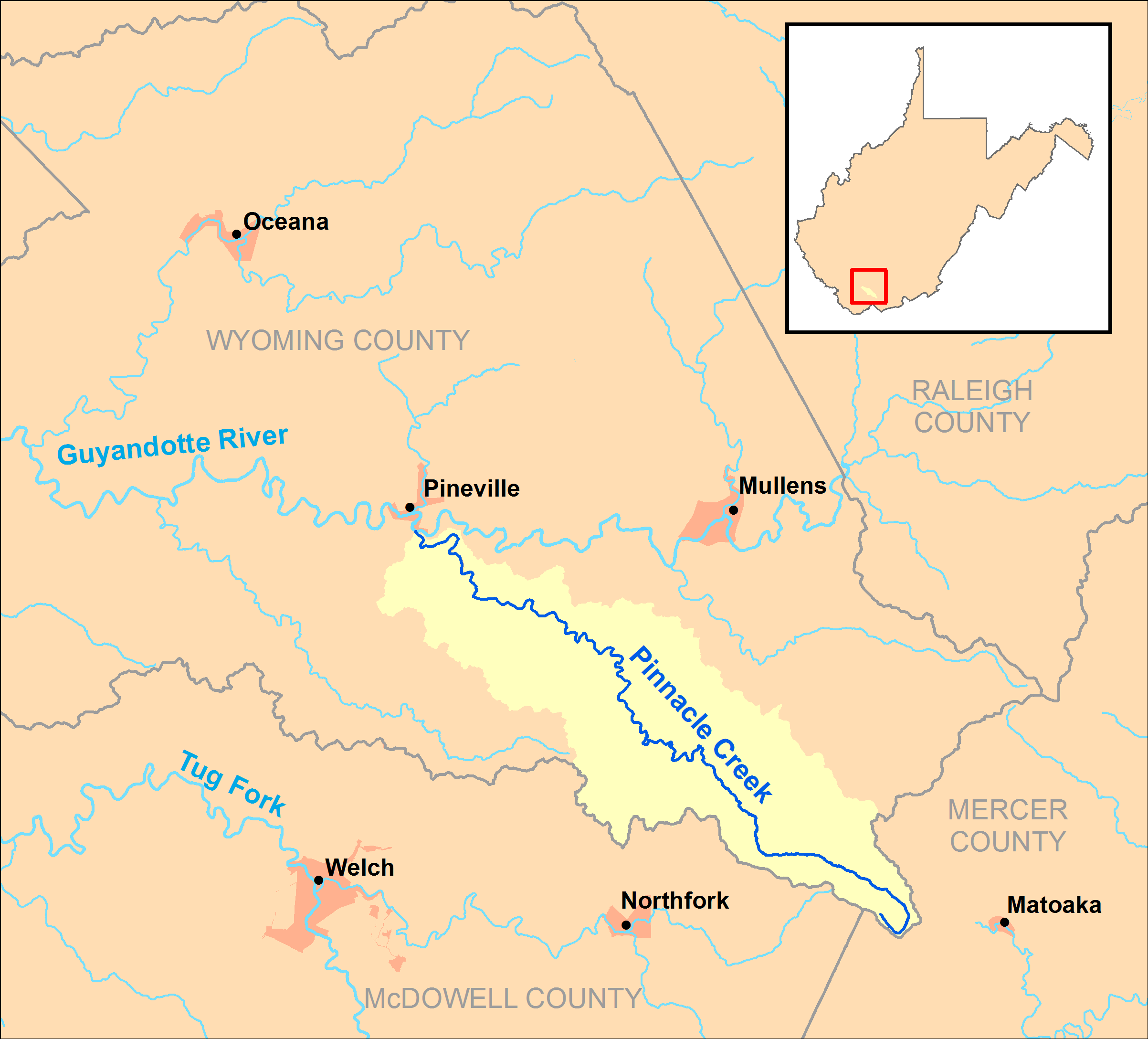
- Pinnacle Creek and its watershed in Wyoming County, West Virginia.

Location
- Country: United States
- State: West Virginia
- County: Wyoming

Physical characteristics
- Source
  - location: east of Crumpler
  - coordinates: 37.4226158°N 81.3028786°W
  - elevation: 3,285 ft (1,001 m)
- Mouth: Guyandotte River
  - location: Pineville
  - coordinates: 37.5748351°N 81.5367722°W
  - elevation: 1,289 ft (393 m)
- Length: 26.6 mi (42.8 km)
- Basin size: 57.23 sq mi (148.2 km^{2})

Pinnacle Creek is a tributary of the Guyandotte River, 26.6 miles (42.8 km) long, in southern West Virginia in the United States. Via the Guyandotte and Ohio rivers, it is part of the watershed of the Mississippi River, draining an area of 57.23 square miles (148.2 km^{2}) in a rural area on the unglaciated portion of the Allegheny Plateau.

Pinnacle Creek's entire course and drainage area are in southern Wyoming County. It rises in the southeastern extremity of Wyoming County, near the common boundary of Wyoming, McDowell, and Mercer counties, approximately 2 miles (3.2 km) east of Crumpler, and flows generally northwestward to the south end of the town of Pineville, where it flows into the Guyandotte River from the south.

According to 1992 data from the United States Geological Survey, approximately 96% of the Pinnacle Creek watershed was forested; approximately 1% was used for agriculture; and approximately 2% was used for commercial or mining purposes.

== See also ==
- List of rivers of West Virginia
