= Hughes Fork =

Stream in West Virginia, U.S.

Coordinates: 38°55′50″N 80°24′12″W

Hughes Fork is a stream in the U.S. state of West Virginia. It is a tributary of Skin Creek.

Hughes Fork was named after Jesse Hughes, a pioneer settler.

== See also ==
- List of rivers of West Virginia
