= Grave Creek =

Grave Creek may refer to:

- Grave Creek (Oregon)
- Grave Creek (West Virginia)
