= Witcher Creek =

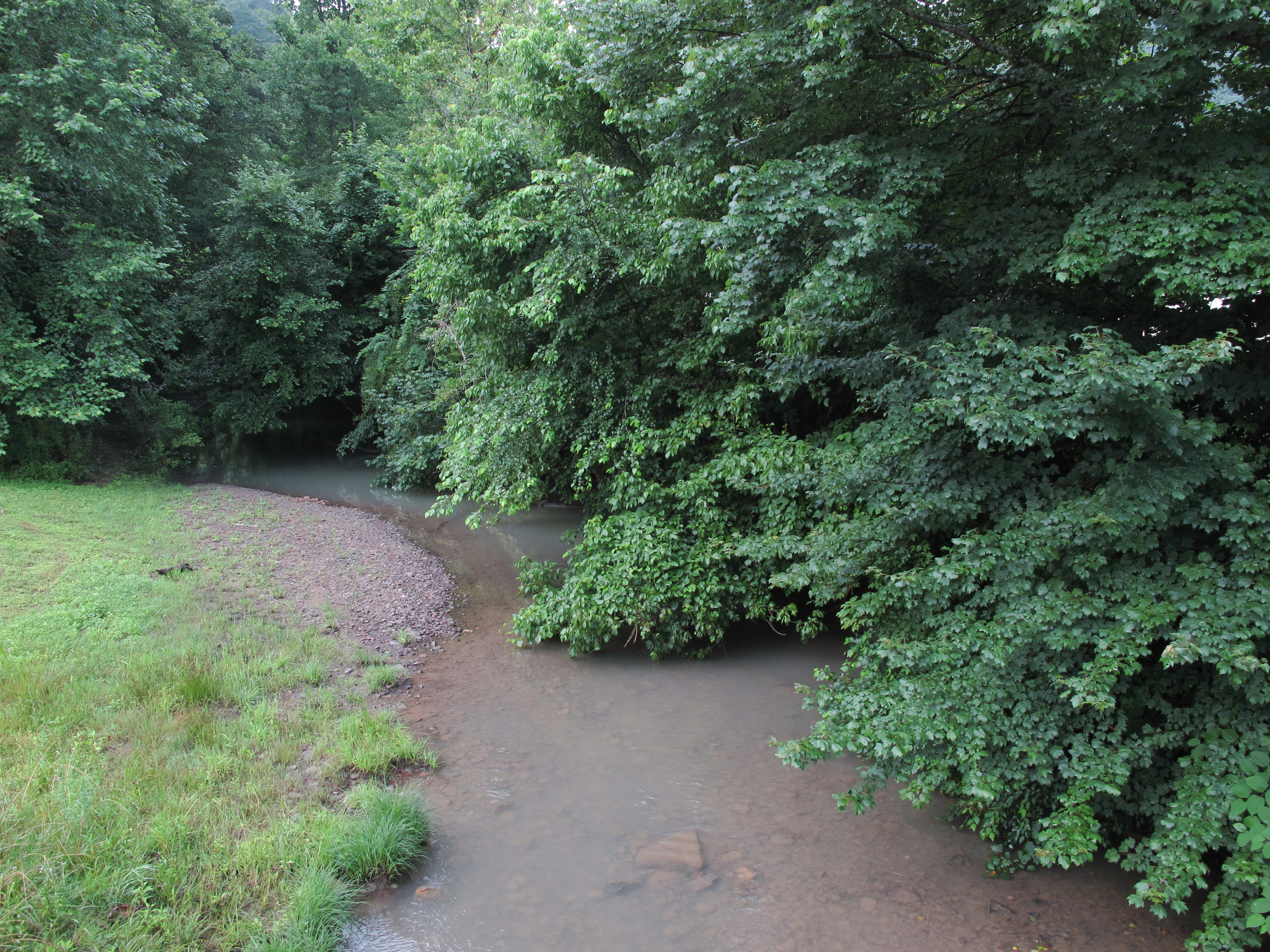
- Witcher Creek in Witcher

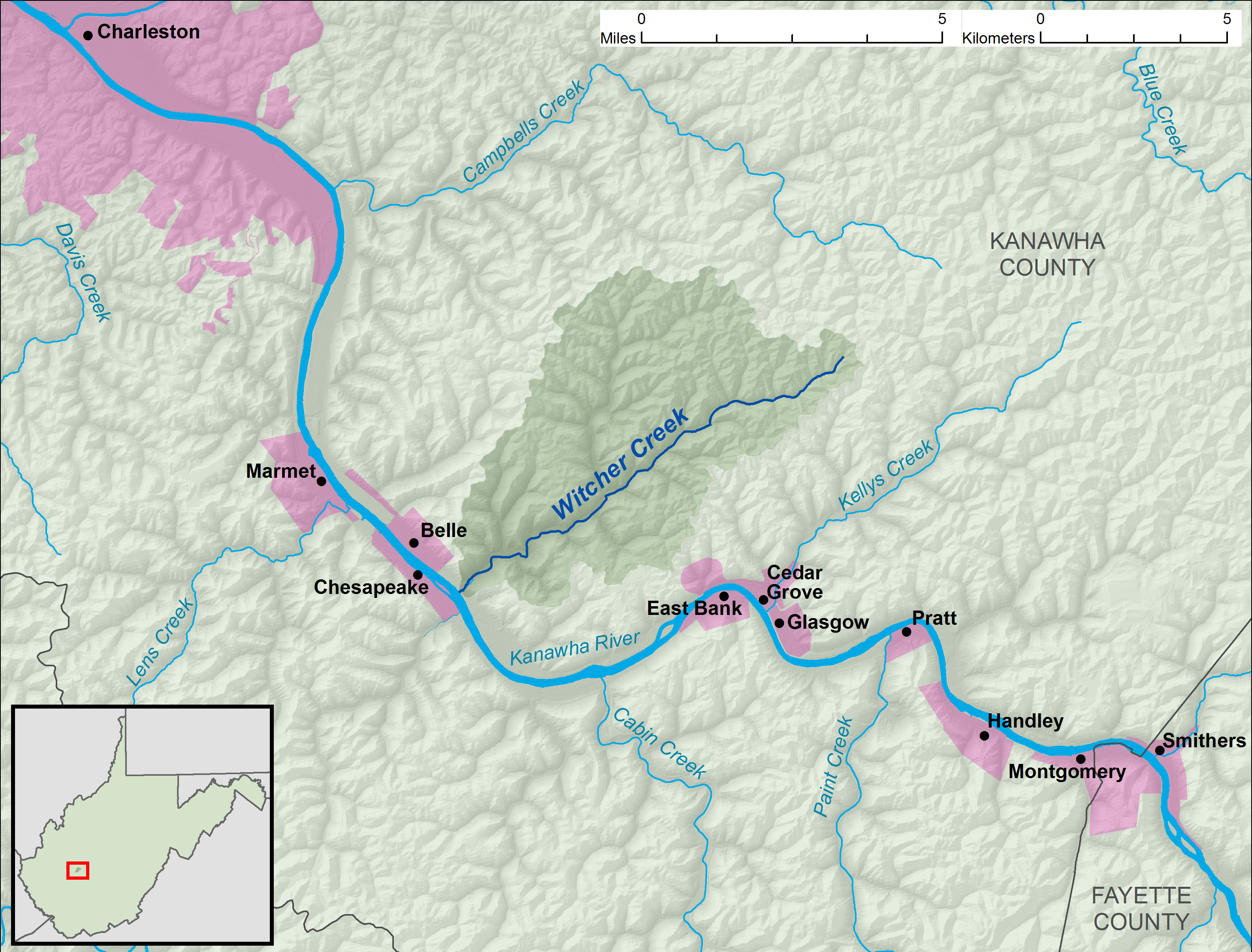
- A map of Witcher Creek and its watershed

Location
- Country: United States
- State: West Virginia
- County: Kanawha

Physical characteristics
- Source
  - location: west-northwest of Mammoth
  - coordinates: 38.2751026°N 81.4017825°W
  - elevation: 1,485 ft (453 m)
- Mouth: Kanawha River
  - location: between Diamond and Belle
  - coordinates: 38.2198244°N 81.5262290°W
  - elevation: 591 ft (180 m)
- Length: 6.8 mi (10.9 km)
- Basin size: 20.8 sq mi (54 km^{2})

Basin features
- Hydrologic Unit Code: 050500060401 (USGS)

Witcher Creek is a tributary of the Kanawha River, 6.8 miles (10.9 km) long, in West Virginia in the United States. Via the Kanawha and Ohio rivers, it is part of the watershed of the Mississippi River, draining an area of 20.8 square miles (54 km^{2}) on the unglaciated portion of the Allegheny Plateau.

Witcher Creek flows for its entire length in eastern Kanawha County. It rises approximately 1.7 miles (2.7 km) west-northwest of Mammoth and flows southwestward through the unincorporated community of Witcher. It flows into the Kanawha River approximately 0.7 miles (1.1 km) southwest of Witcher, between the town of Belle and the unincorporated community of Diamond. The creek is paralleled by a county road for much of its course.

According to the Geographic Names Information System, Witcher Creek has also been known historically by the variant name “Witchers Creek.”

== See also ==
- List of rivers of West Virginia
