= Hazelgreen, West Virginia =

- Unincorporated community
- Location within West Virginia Location within the United States
- Coordinates: 39°04′56″N 80°59′13″W
- Country: United States
- State: West Virginia
- County: Ritchie
- Elevation: 758 ft (231 m)
- Time zone: UTC-5 (Eastern (EST))
  - Summer (DST): UTC-4 (EDT)
- Area codes: 304 & 681
- GNIS feature ID: 1554670

Hazelgreen is an unincorporated community in Ritchie County, West Virginia, United States. Hazelgreen is located along County Route 19 and Spruce Creek, 9.5 miles (15.3 km) south-southeast of Harrisville. Hazelgreen had a post office, which closed on May 13, 1995.
