= New Martinsville, West Virginia =

City in West Virginia, US

- City
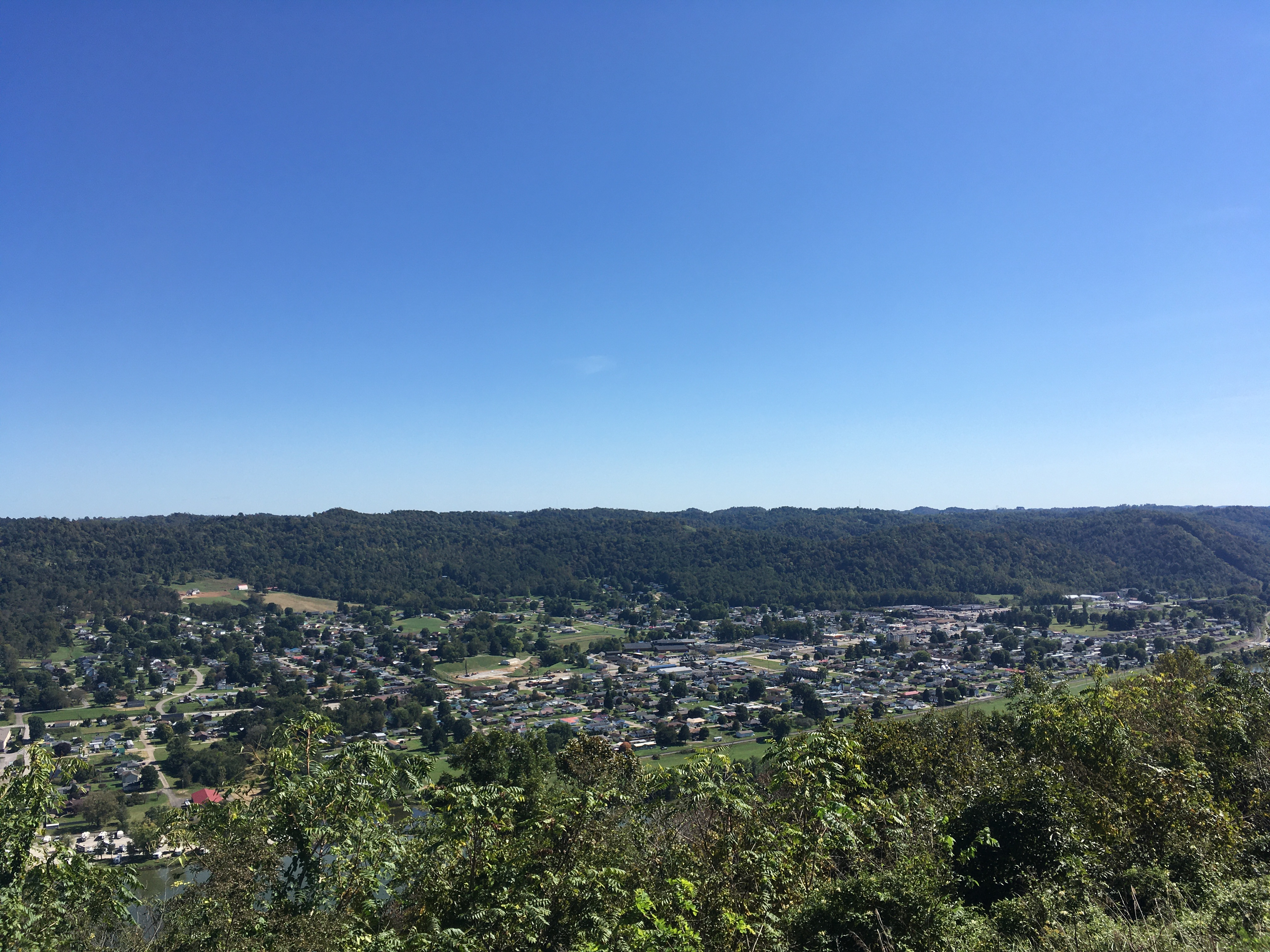
- View from Keidaisch Point on the Ohio side of the river

- Seal Logo
- Interactive map of New Martinsville, West Virginia
- Location within West Virginia Location within the United States
- Coordinates: 39°39′27″N 80°51′34″W
- Country: United States
- State: West Virginia
- County: Wetzel
- Chartered: 1838

Government
  - Type: Mayor–council

Area
  - Total: 2.71 sq mi (7.02 km^{2})
  - Land: 2.67 sq mi (6.92 km^{2})
  - Water: 0.039 sq mi (0.10 km^{2})
- Elevation: 620 ft (190 m)

Population (2020)
  - Total: 5,204
  - Estimate (2021): 5,174
  - Density: 1,914.9/sq mi (739.36/km^{2})
- Time zone: UTC-5 (Eastern (EST))
  - Summer (DST): UTC-4 (EDT)
- ZIP code: 26155
- Area code: 304
- FIPS code: 54-58684
- GNIS feature ID: 1544131
- Website: newmartinsville.com

New Martinsville is a city in and the county seat of Wetzel County, West Virginia, United States, along the Ohio River. The population was 5,186 at the 2020 census.

== History ==
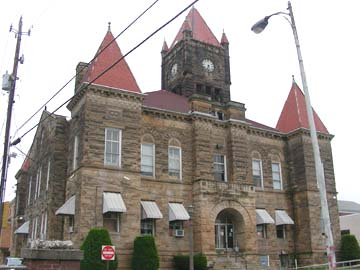
Wetzel County Courthouse in New Martinsville, October 2006

The town was named after Presley Martin, an early settler.

== Geography ==
New Martinsville is located at 39°39′27″N 80°51′34″W (39.657465, -80.859504). Doolin Run and Fishing Creek are located downstream nearby, just south of town.

According to the United States Census Bureau, the city has a total area of 2.71 square miles (7.02 km^{2}), of which 2.67 square miles (6.92 km^{2}) is land and 0.04 square miles (0.10 km^{2}) is water.

=== Climate ===
The climate in this area is characterized by relatively high temperatures and evenly distributed precipitation throughout the year. According to the Köppen Climate Classification system, New Martinsville has a Humid subtropical climate, abbreviated "Cfa" on climate maps.

== Demographics ==
Historical population
Census	Pop.	Note	%±
1850	228		—
1870	260		—
1880	778		199.2%
1890	692		−11.1%
1900	1,089		57.4%
1910	2,176		99.8%
1920	2,341		7.6%
1930	2,814		20.2%
1940	3,491		24.1%
1950	4,084		17.0%
1960	5,607		37.3%
1970	6,528		16.4%
1980	7,109		8.9%
1990	6,705		−5.7%
2000	5,984		−10.8%
2010	5,366		−10.3%
2020	5,204		−3.0%
2021 (est.)	5,174		−0.6%
U.S. Decennial Census

=== 2020 census ===
As of the 2020 census, New Martinsville had a population of 5,204. The median age was 47.2 years. 19.1% of residents were under the age of 18 and 24.0% of residents were 65 years of age or older. For every 100 females there were 92.6 males, and for every 100 females age 18 and over there were 91.1 males age 18 and over.

100.0% of residents lived in urban areas, while 0.0% lived in rural areas.

There were 2,268 households in New Martinsville, of which 24.7% had children under the age of 18 living in them. Of all households, 41.4% were married-couple households, 19.3% were households with a male householder and no spouse or partner present, and 30.9% were households with a female householder and no spouse or partner present. About 33.9% of all households were made up of individuals and 17.2% had someone living alone who was 65 years of age or older.

There were 2,633 housing units, of which 13.9% were vacant. The homeowner vacancy rate was 2.1% and the rental vacancy rate was 17.7%.

Racial composition as of the 2020 census
Race	Number	Percent
White	4,916	94.5%
Black or African American	22	0.4%
American Indian and Alaska Native	9	0.2%
Asian	39	0.7%
Native Hawaiian and Other Pacific Islander	0	0.0%
Some other race	36	0.7%
Two or more races	182	3.5%
Hispanic or Latino (of any race)	83	1.6%

=== 2010 census ===
As of the census of 2010, there were 5,366 people, 2,340 households, and 1,477 families living in the city. The population density was 2,009.7 inhabitants per square mile (775.9/km^{2}). There were 2,632 housing units at an average density of 985.8 per square mile (380.6/km^{2}). The racial makeup of the city was 98.2% White, 0.2% African American, 0.1% Native American, 0.6% Asian, 0.3% from other races, and 0.6% from two or more races. Hispanic or Latino of any race were 0.6% of the population.

There were 2,340 households, of which 25.7% had children under the age of 18 living with them, 46.8% were married couples living together, 12.1% had a female householder with no husband present, 4.2% had a male householder with no wife present, and 36.9% were non-families. 32.2% of all households were made up of individuals, and 15.1% had someone living alone who was 65 years of age or older. The average household size was 2.24 and the average family size was 2.78.

The median age in the city was 46.5 years. 20.5% of residents were under the age of 18; 6.1% were between the ages of 18 and 24; 20.9% were from 25 to 44; 30.6% were from 45 to 64; and 21.7% were 65 years of age or older. The gender makeup of the city was 47.2% male and 52.8% female.

=== 2000 census ===
As of the census of 2000, there were 5,984 people, 2,484 households, and 1,684 families living in the city. The population density was 2,157.4 people per square mile (834.1/km^{2}). There were 2,737 housing units at an average density of 986.8 per square mile (381.5/km^{2}). The racial makeup of the city was 98.55% White, 0.05% African American, 0.10% Native American, 0.75% Asian, 0.03% Pacific Islander, 0.02% from other races, and 0.50% from two or more races. Hispanic or Latino of any race were 0.43% of the population.

There were 2,484 households, out of which 28.9% had children under the age of 18 living with them, 52.6% were married couples living together, 11.7% had a female householder with no husband present, and 32.2% were non-families. 28.9% of all households were made up of individuals, and 13.4% had someone living alone who was 65 years of age or older. The average household size was 2.34 and the average family size was 2.86.

In the city, the population was spread out, with 22.9% under the age of 18, 6.7% from 18 to 24, 25.4% from 25 to 44, 26.8% from 45 to 64, and 18.2% who were 65 years of age or older. The median age was 42 years. For every 100 females, there were 88.2 males. For every 100 females age 18 and over, there were 81.5 males.

The median income for a household in the city was $33,750, and the median income for a family was $40,851. Males had a median income of $37,614 versus $21,019 for females. The per capita income for the city was $18,578. About 16.9% of families and 20.6% of the population were below the poverty line, including 29.4% of those under age 18 and 15.1% of those age 65 or over.

== Popular culture ==
In 1925, the majority of the film Stage Struck was shot in New Martinsville.

== Notable people ==
- Chris Booker, entertainment personality
- John Callaway, journalist
- John Murtha, Democratic Party member of the United States House of Representatives
- Bill Stewart, former head football coach at West Virginia University

== See also ==
- List of cities in West Virginia
- List of cities and towns along the Ohio River
- Lewis Wetzel
- New Martinsville Bridge
- Magnolia High School
- Stage Struck (1925) movie made in New Martinsville with Gloria Swanson
