= Blair, Logan County, West Virginia =

Unincorporated community in West Virginia, United States

Blair, West Virginia
- Unincorporated community
- Location within West Virginia Location within the United States
- Coordinates: 37°52′42″N 81°49′40″W
- Country: United States
- State: West Virginia
- County: Logan

Population (2000)
  - Total: 87
  - Density: 26.8/sq mi (10.36/km^{2})
- Time zone: UTC-5 (Eastern (EST))
  - Summer (DST): UTC-4 (EDT)
- FIPS code: 1553921

Blair is an unincorporated community in Logan County, West Virginia, United States, on the Spruce Fork. Blair lies along West Virginia Route 17.

== Geography ==
Blair is located in the headwaters of Spruce Fork of Little Coal River at the foot of Blair Mountain. Blair Mountain separates the communities of Blair, Sharples, and Clothier from the bulk of Logan County.
