= Sitlington, West Virginia =

- Unincorporated community
- Location within West Virginia Location within the United States
- Coordinates: 38°21′30″N 79°55′30″W
- Country: United States
- State: West Virginia
- County: Pocahontas
- Elevation: 2,402 ft (732 m)
- Time zone: UTC-5 (Eastern (EST))
  - Summer (DST): UTC-4 (EDT)
- Area codes: 304 & 681
- GNIS feature ID: 1555633

Sitlington is an unincorporated community in Pocahontas County, West Virginia, United States. Sitlington is located at the confluence of the Greenbrier River and Sitlington Creek, 13 miles (21 km) northeast of Marlinton.

The community takes its name from nearby Sitlington Creek.
