= Smoky Drain =

Stream in West Virginia, U.S.

Coordinates: 39°40′40″N 80°06′24″W

Smoky Drain is a stream in the U.S. state of West Virginia.

Smoky Drain was named for a family of settlers near the creek, all of whom were heavy smokers.

== See also ==
- List of rivers of West Virginia
