= Arches Fork =

Stream in West Virginia, U.S.

Coordinates: 39°30′13″N 80°35′08″W

Arches Fork is a stream in the U.S. state of West Virginia.

Arches Fork derives its name from Archibald Woods, a surveyor.

== See also ==
- List of rivers of West Virginia
