= Hitchcock Run =

Stream in West Virginia, U.S.

Coordinates: 39°16′41″N 81°02′21″W

Hitchcock Run is a stream in Ritchie County, West Virginia.

Hitchcock Run was named after William Hitchcock.

== See also ==
- List of rivers of West Virginia
