= Derrick Creek =

Stream in Kanawha county, West Virginia, U.S.

Coordinates: 38°30′48″N 81°40′25″W

Derrick Creek is a stream in the U.S. state of West Virginia.

Derrick Creek has the name of a pioneer who settled there.

== See also ==
- List of rivers of West Virginia
