= Belcher Branch =

Stream in West Virginia, U.S.

Coordinates: 37°22′24″N 81°16′17″W

Belcher Branch is a stream in the U.S. state of West Virginia.

Belcher Branch has the name of H. E. Belcher, a local pioneer settler.

It is a tributary of the Bluestone River by way of Crane Creek.

== See also ==
- List of rivers of West Virginia
