= Crow Run =

Stream in West Virginia, U.S.

Coordinates: 39°33′48″N 80°43′34″W

Crow Run is a stream in the U.S. state of West Virginia.

Crow Run was named after J. J. Crow, a pioneer hunter who was killed by Indians.

== See also ==
- List of rivers of West Virginia
