= Indian Camp Run =

Stream in West Virginia, U.S.

Coordinates: 38°51′42″N 80°12′13″W

Indian Camp Run is a stream in the U.S. state of West Virginia.

Indian Camp Run most likely took its name from a nearby rock where Native Americans were known to camp.

== See also ==
- List of rivers of West Virginia
