= Gorby Run =

Stream in West Virginia, U.S.

Coordinates: 39°20′10″N 80°47′21″W

Gorby Run is a stream in the U.S. state of West Virginia.

Gorby Run most likely was named after the local Gorby family.

== See also ==
- List of rivers of West Virginia
