= Muchmores Run =

Tributary of the Ohio River

Muchmores Run Tributary to Ohio River
- Location of Muchmores Run mouth Muchmores Run (the United States)

Location
- Country: United States
- State: West Virginia
- County: Hancock
- City: Newell

Physical characteristics
- Source: Congo Run divide
  - location: about 2.5 miles south of Newell, West Virginia
  - coordinates: 40°35′48″N 080°36′07″W
  - elevation: 1,060 ft (320 m)
- Mouth: Ohio River
  - location: Newell, West Virginia
  - coordinates: 40°37′17″N 080°36′31″W
  - elevation: 665 ft (203 m)
- Length: 2.17 mi (3.49 km)
- Basin size: 1.36 square miles (3.5 km^{2})
- Discharge
  - location: Ohio River
  - average: 1.38 cu ft/s (0.039 m^{3}/s) at mouth with Ohio River

Basin features
- Progression: Ohio River → Mississippi River → Gulf of Mexico
- River system: Ohio River
- Tributaries
  - left: unnamed tributaries
  - right: unnamed tributaries
- Bridges: Arena Drive, Glendale Road (x3), 6th Street, WV 2, Fiesta Drive

Muchmores Run is a 2.17 mi (3.49 km) long 1st order tributary to the Ohio River in Hancock County, West Virginia. This is the only stream of this name in the United States.

== Course ==
Muchmores Run rises about 2.5 miles south of Newell, West Virginia, in Hancock County and then flows north to join the Ohio River at Newell.

== Watershed ==
Muchmores Run drains 1.36 square miles (3.5 km^{2}) of area, receives about 38.0 in/year of precipitation, has a wetness index of 297.98, and is about 78% forested.

== See also ==
- List of rivers of West Virginia
