= Span Oak Run =

Stream in West Virginia, U.S.

Coordinates: 38°37′38″N 79°46′40″W

Span Oak Run is a stream in the U.S. state of West Virginia.

Span Oak Run was named after a fallen tree which once spanned the creek.

== See also ==
- List of rivers of West Virginia
