= Worthington Creek =

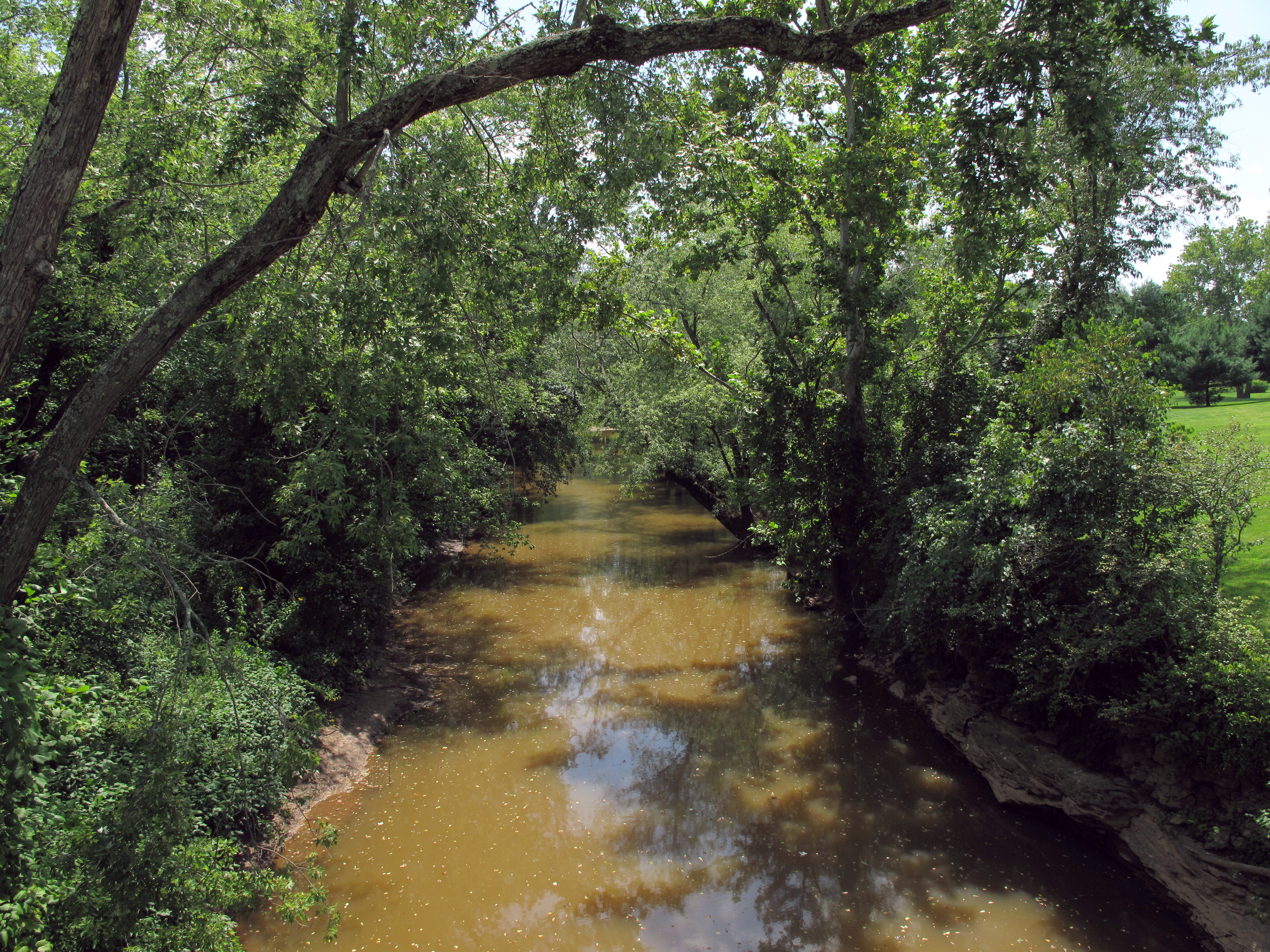
- Worthington Creek in Parkersburg in 2010

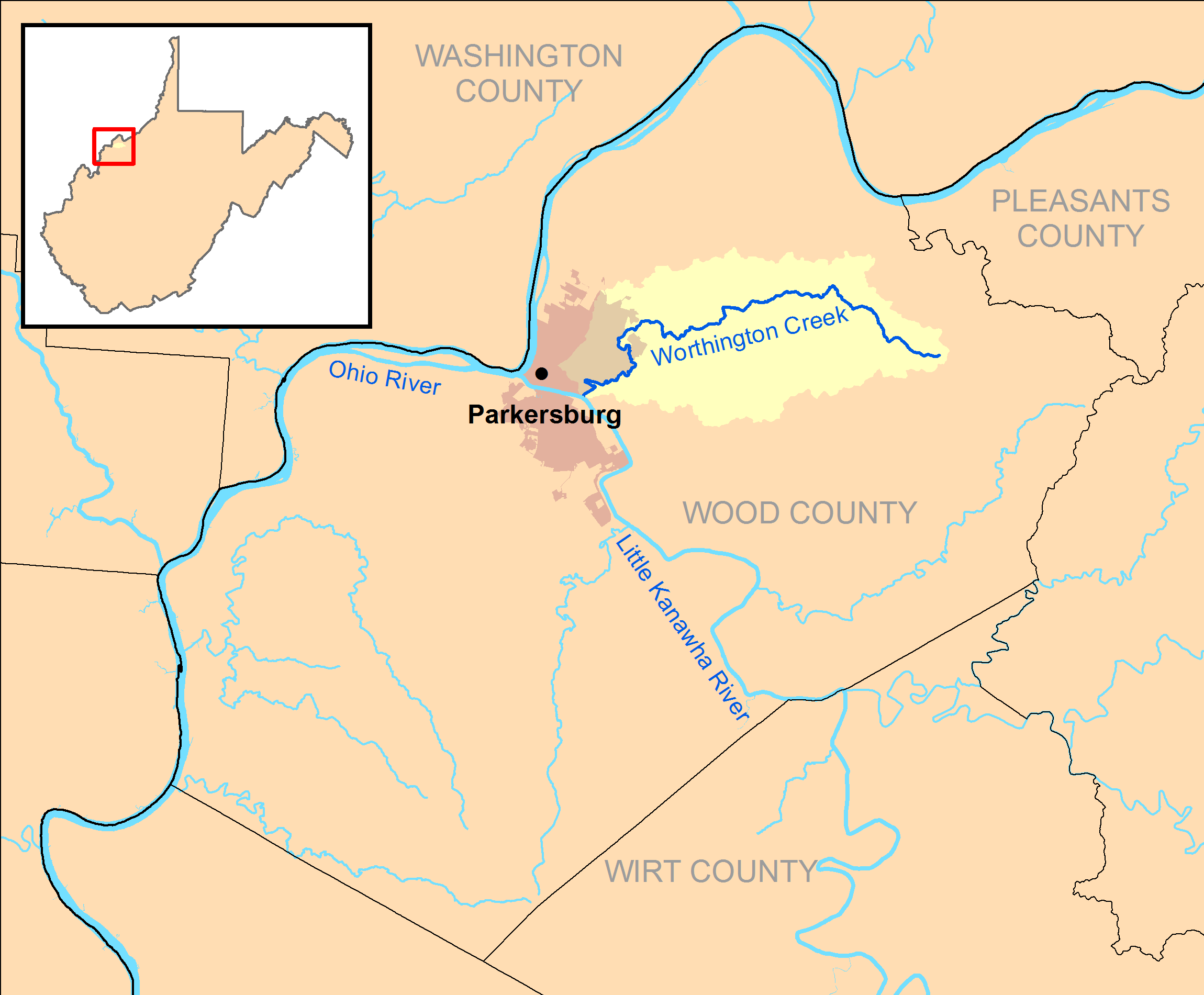
- Worthington Creek and its watershed in Wood County, West Virginia

Location
- Country: United States
- State: West Virginia
- County: Wood

Physical characteristics
- Source
  - location: south of Waverly
  - coordinates: 39.2797976°N 81.3467838°W
  - elevation: 906 ft (276 m)
- Mouth: Little Kanawha River
  - location: Parkersburg
  - coordinates: 39.2575751°N 81.5359569°W
  - elevation: 587 ft (179 m)
- Length: 15.4 mi (24.8 km)
- Basin size: 35 sq mi (91 km^{2})

Worthington Creek is a tributary of the Little Kanawha River, 15.4 miles (24.8 km) long, in western West Virginia in the United States. Via the Little Kanawha and Ohio rivers, it is part of the watershed of the Mississippi River, draining an area of 35 square miles (91 km^{2}) in the city of Parkersburg and its vicinity.

Worthington Creek flows for its entire length in northern Wood County. It rises approximately 1 mile (1.6 km) south of Waverly and flows generally southwestward to Parkersburg, where it flows into the Little Kanawha River from the north, approximately 1.9 miles (3.1 km) upstream of the Little Kanawha River's mouth.

According to the West Virginia Department of Environmental Protection, approximately 68% of the Worthington Creek watershed is forested, mostly deciduous. Approximately 23% is used for pasture and agriculture, and approximately 9% is developed.

According to the Geographic Names Information System, Worthington Creek has also been known by the name "Worthingtons Creek."

== See also ==
- List of rivers of West Virginia
