= Sammy Run =

Stream in West Virginia, U.S.

Coordinates: 38°54′13″N 80°25′27″W

Sammy Run is a stream in the U.S. state of West Virginia.

Sammy Run was named after Samuel Wilson, a pioneer settler.

== See also ==
- List of rivers of West Virginia
