= Hushers Run =

Stream in West Virginia, U.S.

Coordinates: 39°14′20″N 81°06′33″W

Hushers Run is a stream in the U.S. state of West Virginia.

Hushers Run was named after George Husher, an early settler.

== See also ==
- List of rivers of West Virginia
