= Den Run =

Coordinates: 39°09′37″N 81°02′43″W

Den Run is a stream located entirely within Ritchie County, West Virginia. It is a tributary to Indian Creek.

Den Run was descriptively named by the Native Americans in the area.

== See also ==
- List of rivers of West Virginia
