= McKown Creek =

Stream in West Virginia, U.S.

Coordinates: 38°37′57″N 81°23′54″W

McKown Creek is a stream in the U.S. state of West Virginia.

McKown Creek was named after Isaac and Gilbert McKown, local pioneer men.

== See also ==
- List of rivers of West Virginia
