= Tackett Creek =

Stream in West Virginia, U.S.

Coordinates: 38°23′20″N 81°50′27″W

Tackett Creek is a stream in the U.S. state of West Virginia.

Tackett Creek was named in the 18th century after Sam Tackett.

== See also ==
- List of rivers of West Virginia
