= Glenns Run (Ohio River tributary) =

Tributary of the Ohio River

Glenns Run Tributary to Ohio River
- Location of Glenns Run mouth Glenns Run (Ohio River tributary) (the United States)

Location
- Country: United States
- States: West Virginia
- County: Ohio
- City: Wheeling

Physical characteristics
- Source: Souttell Run divide
  - location: about 2 miles east of Wheeling, West Virginia
  - coordinates: 40°07′25″N 080°42′18″W
  - elevation: 1,100 ft (340 m)
- Mouth: Ohio River
  - location: Wheeling, West Virginia
  - coordinates: 40°07′59″N 080°40′15″W
  - elevation: 623 ft (190 m)
- Length: 2.49 mi (4.01 km)
- Basin size: 2.79 square miles (7.2 km^{2})
- Discharge
  - location: Ohio River
  - average: 3.25 cu ft/s (0.092 m^{3}/s) at mouth with Ohio River

Basin features
- Progression: Ohio River → Mississippi River → Gulf of Mexico
- River system: Ohio River
- Tributaries
  - left: unnamed tributaries
  - right: unnamed tributaries
- Bridges: Cherry Hill Road, WV 2

Glenns Run is a 2.49 mi (4.01 km) long 2nd order tributary to the Ohio River in Ohio County, West Virginia.

== Variant names ==
According to the Geographic Names Information System, it has also been known historically as:

- Glens Run

== Course ==
Glenns Run rises about 2 miles east of Wheeling, West Virginia, and then flows westerly to join the Ohio River in the Warwood neighborhood of Wheeling, West Virginia.

== Watershed ==
Glenns Run drains 2.79 square miles (7.2 km^{2}) of area, receives about 40.2 in/year of precipitation, has a wetness index of 304.81, and is about 70% forested. It also is orange in color presumably from mine drainage which can be seen from Google satellite images.

== See also ==
- List of rivers of West Virginia
