= Holbert Run =

Tributary of the Ohio River

Holbert Run Tributary to Ohio River
- Location of Holbert Run mouth Holbert Run (the United States)

Location
- Country: United States
- State: West Virginia
- County: Hancock

Physical characteristics
- Source: North Fork Kings Creek divide
  - location: about 2 miles north of Sun Valley, West Virginia
  - coordinates: 40°28′00″N 080°34′03″W
  - elevation: 1,100 ft (340 m)
- Mouth: Ohio River
  - location: about 2.5 miles north of Weirton, West Virginia
  - coordinates: 40°28′16″N 080°35′33″W
  - elevation: 644 ft (196 m)
- Length: 2.87 mi (4.62 km)
- Basin size: 4.00 square miles (10.4 km^{2})
- Discharge
  - location: Ohio River
  - average: 3.98 cu ft/s (0.113 m^{3}/s) at mouth with Ohio River

Basin features
- Progression: Ohio River → Mississippi River → Gulf of Mexico
- River system: Ohio River
- Tributaries
  - left: unnamed tributaries
  - right: unnamed tributaries
- Bridges: Holbert Run Road (x4), WV 2

Holbert Run is a 2.87 mi (4.62 km) long 2nd order tributary to the Ohio River in Hancock County, West Virginia. This is the only stream of this name in the United States.

== Course ==
Holbert Run rises about 2 miles (3.2 km) north of Sun Valley, West Virginia, in Hancock County and then flows generally west-southwest to join the Ohio River about 2.5 miles (4.0 km) north of Weirton.

== Watershed ==
Holbert Run drains 4.00 square miles (10.4 km^{2}) of area, receives about 38.3 inches per year (97 cm/year) of precipitation, has a wetness index of 279.73, and is about 87% forested.

== See also ==
- List of rivers of West Virginia
