= Big Cub Creek =

Stream in West Virginia, U.S.

Coordinates: 37°36′49″N 81°47′25″W

Big Cub Creek is a stream in the U.S. state of West Virginia.

Big Cub Creek was named for the fact bear cubs were seen there by a settler.

== See also ==
- List of rivers of West Virginia
