= Wheeler Fork =

Stream in West Virginia, U.S.

Coordinates: 38°55′01″N 80°22′43″W

Wheeler Fork is a stream in the U.S. state of West Virginia.

Wheeler Fork was named after a man named Wheeler who settled the area.

== See also ==
- List of rivers of West Virginia
