= Hans Creek =

Stream in West Virginia, U.S.

Coordinates: 37°33′13″N 80°44′07″W

Hans Creek is a stream in the U.S. state of West Virginia.

Hans Creek derives its name from John Hand (or Hance), a pioneer settler.

== See also ==
- List of rivers of West Virginia
