= Limestone Run (North Branch Potomac River tributary) =

Stream in Mineral County, West Virginia

Coordinates: 39°26′18″N 78°57′50″W

Limestone Run is a 4.6-mile-long (7.4 km) stream that lies to the east of New Creek Mountain in Mineral County, West Virginia. It is a tributary of the North Branch Potomac River.

== See also ==
- Twin Mountain and Potomac Railroad
- List of rivers of West Virginia
