= Fishing Creek (West Virginia) =

Stream in West Virginia, U.S.

Coordinates: 39.6378°N 80.8672°W

Fishing Creek is a stream in the U.S. state of West Virginia. It flows into the Ohio River at New Martinsville.

Fishing Creek's name comes from the Native Americans of the area, who once fished there.

== See also ==
- List of rivers of West Virginia
