= Hospital Run =

Stream in West Virginia, U.S.

Coordinates: 38°26′30″N 79°49′54″W

Hospital Run is a stream in the U.S. state of West Virginia.

Hospital Run was so named for the fact an Indian who recovered from his wounds near its banks.

== See also ==
- List of rivers of West Virginia
