= Geho Run =

Stream in West Virginia, U.S.

Coordinates: 38°14′38″N 80°39′29″W

Geho Run is a stream in the U.S. state of West Virginia.

Geho Run most likely was named after one Mr. Geho, the proprietor of a local blacksmith shop.

== See also ==
- List of rivers of West Virginia
