= Zebs Creek =

Coordinates: 38°57′42″N 79°58′58″W

Location
- Countries: United States

Zebs Creek is a stream in the U.S. state of West Virginia.

Zebs Creek was named after Zebe Cottarrall, a pioneer figure.

== See also ==
- List of rivers of West Virginia
