= Laurel Fork (North Fork South Branch Potomac River tributary) =

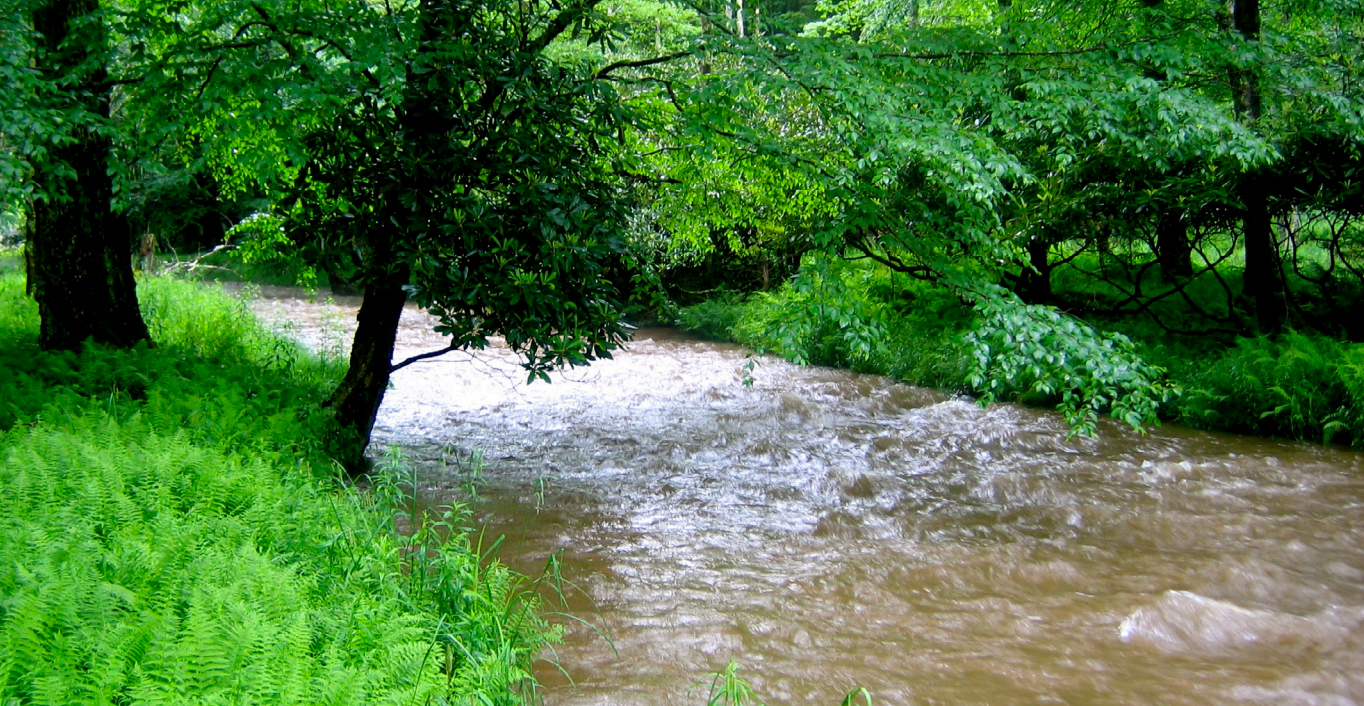
- Laurel Fork near bankfull stage in 2006

- Location of the mouth of the Laurel Fork in West Virginia

Location
- Country: United States
- State: Virginia, West Virginia
- County: Highland County, Virginia, Pendleton County, West Virginia

Physical characteristics
- Source
  - location: Appalachian Mountains, Highland County, Virginia
  - coordinates: 38°26′16″N 79°41′15″W
  - elevation: 4,094 ft (1,248 m)
- Mouth: North Fork South Branch Potomac River
  - location: North of Hardscrabble, Virginia, in Pendleton County, West Virginia
  - coordinates: 38°34′13″N 79°34′13″W
  - elevation: 2,495 ft (760 m)
- Length: 15.7 mi (25.3 km)

The Laurel Fork is a 15.7-mile-long (25.3 km) stream in Virginia and West Virginia, United States. The stream flows north from Highland County, Virginia, where its source and the majority of its length is located, to its mouth in Pendleton County, West Virginia. Laurel Fork is a tributary to the North Fork South Branch Potomac River, making it a part of the Potomac River watershed. The area surrounding Laurel Fork is home to several plant and animal species found nowhere else in Virginia, and is a prime example of a northern boreal forest in the state.

== Course ==
Laurel Fork begins in a mountainous region of Highland County, Virginia near the county's western border with Pocahontas County, West Virginia. The stream's source is located approximately 1.7 miles (2.7 km) southwest of U.S. Route 250 near the southern slopes of Bear Mountain at an elevation of 4,094 feet (1,248 m). This location is approximately 1,100 feet (340 m) to the east of the Eastern Continental Divide. From its source, Laurel Fork flows northward, crossing under U.S. 250, in a winding manner. After collecting the tributary waters of the smaller Collins Run and Blights Run, Secondary Route 642 (Laurel Fork Road) begins to run alongside the Laurel Fork, approximately 3.3 miles (5.3 km) north of U.S. Route 250. Near this location, the stream flows under 642 near the mouth of the tributary Mullenax Run. At Mullenax Run, Laurel Fork enters the Laurel Fork Special Management Area of the George Washington National Forest. A short distance to the north of Mullenax Run, Laurel Fork collects the waters of Newman Run and 642 leaves the banks of Laurel Fork to the east. The stream continues winding northward from Newman Run through the National Forest, intersecting the tributary streams of (from south to north) Bearwallow Run, Lost Run, Knotmaul Run, Christian Run, Slabcamp Run, Locust Spring Run, Buck Run, and Cold Spring Run. Approximately 4 miles (6.4 km) northeast of Newman Run and Secondary Route 642, Laurel Fork enters Pendleton County, West Virginia.

Upon entering the state of West Virginia, Laurel Fork enters the Monongahela National Forest and takes an eastwardly turn. The stream flows approximately 1.5 miles (2.4 km) east, collecting the tributary waters of Sams Run, before reaching its mouth. The Laurel Fork's mouth is at an elevation of 2,495 feet (760 m) approximately 15.7 miles (25.3 km) downstream from its source. At this point, Laurel Fork joins Straight Fork, which flows northward roughly parallel to Laurel Fork in a valley to the east. Located .6 miles (0.97 km) north of the village of Hardscrabble, Virginia, the confluence of the Laurel and Straight Forks begins the North Fork South Branch Potomac River.

== Watershed ==
Laurel Fork's watershed and course is located within the Alleghany Valley of western Highland County, with a short extension to the north into Pendleton County. The Alleghany Valley is situated between Allegheny Mountain to the west and Lantz Mountain to the east. The northern portion of the valley is divided into two watersheds, those of the Laurel Fork to the west and the Straight Fork to the east, by Middle Mountain. The sub-valley between Allegheny Mountain and Middle mountain contains the watershed of the Laurel Fork, and is characterized as shallow and elevated. The hillsides surrounding Laurel Fork are steep, with elevations along the ridges of Allegheny Mountain to the west of the stream averaging 4,000 feet (1,200 m).

The stream meanders through predominately heavily wooded hillsides with a moderate gradient. Laurel Fork's substrate primarily consists of cobble and gravel. The area of Laurel Fork within the Special Management Area in Virginia was designated as an Exceptional State Water in Virginia. This designation arises from the stream's "outstanding scenic beauty", "exceptional aquatic communities", and "superior recreational opportunities".

== Flora and fauna ==
The Laurel Fork area hosts many different species of plants and animals, among which there are several unique and endangered species. The Laurel Fork Special Management Area (SMA), located in the George Washington National Forest, covers part of the stream's run. Within the Commonwealth of Virginia, at least twenty-five species are known to only live in the Laurel Fork SMA.

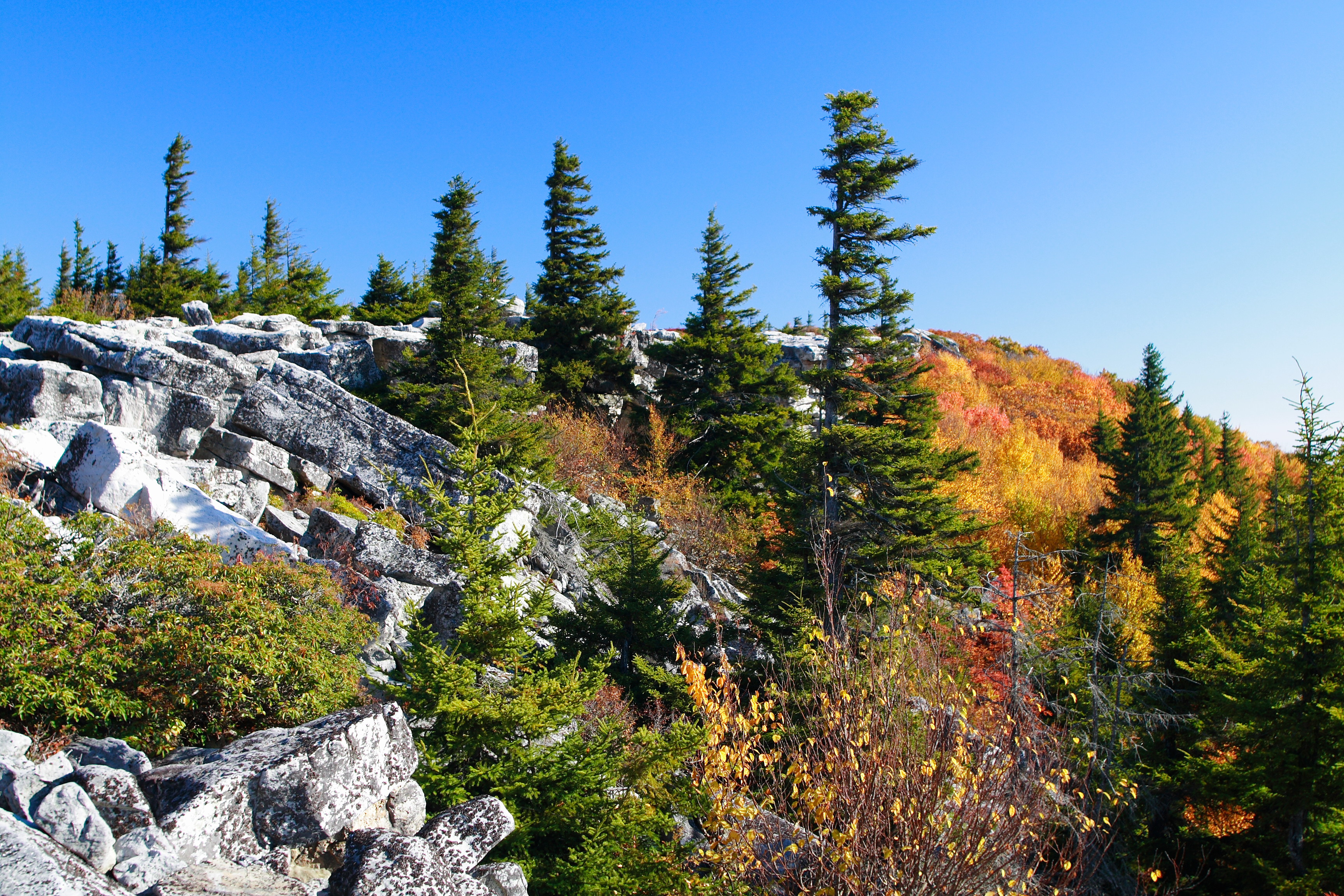
Example of Picea rubens (red spruce) in West Virginia

=== Plants ===
The Laurel Fork area, especially the SMA, is known to be "one of Virginia's finest examples of a northern boreal natural community". The area is home to a large amount of red spruce, along with Fraser Fir, Hemlock, and various northern hardwoods. Rhododendron bushes are common in the area and are described in some sections to present a "veritable barrier". It is the rhododendron, which is often called "laurel", that gave the Laurel Fork its name. Sphagnum mosses along the spruce-fir forest floor are common as are berries, such as bearberry, gooseberry, and blueberries.

=== Animals ===
Three state endangered species of animals are present within the Laurel Fork SMA: the Virginia northern flying squirrel, the snowshoe hare, and the water shrew. The distribution in Virginia of all three of these species is limited to a small number of counties, with the snowshoe hare only found in Highland County. Fishers are found in the area of Laurel Fork, but most of these are probably "wanderers" from West Virginia. Birds are found in many varieties in the SMA, such as the red-breasted nuthatch, white-breasted nuthatch, black-throated green warbler, golden-crowned kinglet, wild turkey and junco. Beavers are found in the area as well, especially in the regions to the west of Laurel Fork. Larger animals such as white-tailed deer, which has a sizable population, and black bears are present in the area.

Fish, especially native brook trout are abundant in Laurel Fork, which is larger in comparison to other Virginia trout streams.

== See also ==
- List of rivers of Virginia
