= Second Creek (Greenbrier River tributary) =

Stream in West Virginia, U.S.

Coordinates: 37°43′33″N 80°31′26″W

Second Creek is a stream in the U.S. state of West Virginia. It is a tributary of the Greenbrier River.

The stream most likely was named for the fact it was the second creek on an old Indian trail.

== See also ==
- List of rivers of West Virginia
