= Kincheloe, West Virginia =

- Unincorporated community
- Location within West Virginia Location within the United States
- Coordinates: 39°08′59″N 80°30′10″W
- Country: United States
- State: West Virginia
- County: Harrison
- Elevation: 1,017 ft (310 m)
- Time zone: UTC-5 (Eastern (EST))
  - Summer (DST): UTC-4 (EDT)
- GNIS feature ID: 1541202

Kincheloe is an unincorporated community in Harrison County, in the U.S. state of West Virginia.

== History ==
A post office called Kincheloe was established in 1855, and remained in operation until 1969. The community was named after nearby Kincheloe Creek.
