= Frog Creek (West Virginia) =

Stream in West Virginia, U.S.

Coordinates: 38°30′10″N 81°42′35″W

Frog Creek is a stream in the U.S. state of West Virginia.

Frog Creek derives its name from a pioneer settler named Frogg. It was once the hub of a saw mill and lumber logging operation that included a railroad called the Frogg Creek Railroad that extended from Froggs Creek to the river port of Plymouth WV

== See also ==
- List of rivers of West Virginia
