= Trigger Run =

Stream in West Virginia, U.S.

Coordinates: 37°23′40″N 80°47′03″W

Trigger Run is a stream in the U.S. state of West Virginia.

Trigger Run was named from an incident when an early settler's gun trigger malfunctioned.

== See also ==
- List of rivers of West Virginia
