= Maggoty Run =

Stream in West Virginia, U.S.

Coordinates: 39°46′21″N 80°38′46″W

Maggoty Run is a stream in the U.S. state of West Virginia.

Maggoty Run most likely was named for the abundance of gnats along its course.

== See also ==
- List of rivers of West Virginia
