= Upton Creek =

Stream in West Virginia, U.S.

Coordinates: 38°21′23″N 81°45′09″W

Upton Creek is a stream in the U.S. state of West Virginia.

Upton Creek was named after Thomas Upton, a pioneer settler.

== See also ==
- List of rivers of West Virginia
