= Blue Creek (West Virginia) =

Stream in West Virginia, U.S.

Coordinates: 38°26′52″N 81°27′24″W

Blue Creek is a stream in the U.S. state of West Virginia.

Blue Creek was named for the blueish tint of its water.

== See also ==
- List of rivers of West Virginia
