= Beeson Run =

Stream in West Virginia, U.S.

Coordinates: 39°13′52″N 81°24′00″W

Beeson Run is a stream in the U.S. state of West Virginia. It is situated in Wood County. The stream flows into Stillwell Creek, a tributary of the Little Kanawha River.

Beeson Run has the name of Jonas Beeson, a pioneer settler.

== See also ==
- List of rivers of West Virginia
