= Vance, West Virginia =

- Unincorporated community
- Location within West Virginia Location within the United States
- Coordinates: 39°22′41″N 78°44′19″W
- Country: United States
- State: West Virginia
- County: Hampshire
- Time zone: UTC-5 (Eastern (EST))
  - Summer (DST): UTC-4 (EDT)
- GNIS feature ID: 1549969

Vance is an unincorporated community in Hampshire County in the U.S. state of West Virginia. Vance lies on the South Branch Potomac River. Most of its residents reside along West Virginia Route 28. Buffalo Creek empties into the South Branch at Vance.

== Historic site ==
- Fort Forman site, State Route 28
