= Libertybowl Branch =

Stream in West Virginia, U.S.

Coordinates: 38°22′35″N 80°55′36″W

Libertybowl Branch is a stream in the U.S. state of West Virginia.

The name Libertybowl most likely is derived from liberty pole.

== See also ==
- List of rivers of West Virginia
