= Fourpole Creek (Tug Fork tributary) =

Coordinates: 37°30′42″N 81°55′39″W

Location
- Country: United States

Physical characteristics
- Source
  - location: Mingo/McDowell county border, east of Isaban
- Mouth
  - location: Tug Fork at Mohawk, McDowell County, West Virginia

Fourpole Creek is a 4.8-mile-long (7.7 km) tributary of the Tug Fork, belonging to the Ohio River and Mississippi River watersheds. It is located in McDowell and Mingo counties in the U.S. state of West Virginia. Fourpole Creek forms the boundary between McDowell and Mingo counties.

== Tributaries ==
Tributary streams are listed from source to mouth.

- Sims Fork
- Brushy Fork

== List of cities and towns along Fourpole Creek ==
- Isaban
- Mohawk

== See also ==
- List of West Virginia rivers
