= Hominy Creek (West Virginia) =

Stream in West Virginia, U.S.

Coordinates: 38°14′23″N 80°49′59″W

Hominy Creek is a stream in the U.S. state of West Virginia.

Hominy is a name derived from the Algonquian language meaning a type of meal prepared from corn.

== See also ==
- List of rivers of West Virginia
