= Deep Gut Run =

Tributary of the Ohio River

Deep Gut Run Tributary to Ohio River
- Location of Deep Gut Run mouth Deep Gut Run (the United States)

Location
- Country: United States
- State: West Virginia
- County: Hancock

Physical characteristics
- Source: South Fork Tomlinson Run divide
  - location: about New Manchester, West Virginia
  - coordinates: 40°31′52″N 080°34′56″W
  - elevation: 1,100 ft (340 m)
- Mouth: Ohio River
  - location: about 0.5 miles north-northwest of New Cumberland, West Virginia
  - coordinates: 40°30′50″N 080°37′08″W
  - elevation: 644 ft (196 m)
- Length: 2.66 mi (4.28 km)
- Basin size: 2.77 square miles (7.2 km^{2})
- Discharge
  - location: Ohio River
  - average: 2.62 cu ft/s (0.074 m^{3}/s) at mouth with Ohio River

Basin features
- Progression: Ohio River → Mississippi River → Gulf of Mexico
- River system: Ohio River
- Tributaries
  - left: unnamed tributaries
  - right: unnamed tributaries
- Bridges: Archer Street, Rolling Acres Road, Veterans Boulevard (x2), Jacobs Creek Road, Cedar Lane, Veterans Boulevard, WV 2

Deep Gut Run is a stream in the U.S. state of West Virginia.

Deep Gut Run has a sharply defined course, hence the original name Deep Cut Run.

== Variant names ==
According to the Geographic Names Information System, it has also been known historically as:

- Deep Cut Run

== Course ==
Deep Gut Run rises at New Manchester, in Hancock County and then flows southwest to join the Ohio River about 0.5 miles (0.80 km) north-northwest of New Cumberland.

== Watershed ==
Deep Gut Run drains 2.77 square miles (7.2 km^{2}) of area, receives about 37.6 inches per year (96 cm/year) of precipitation, has a wetness index of 324.93, and is about 59% forested.

== See also ==
- List of rivers of West Virginia
