= Negro Run (West Virginia) =

Stream in Wood County, West Virginia, U.S.

Coordinates: 39.13924°N 81.43818°W

Negro Run is a stream in Wood County, West Virginia, in the United States.

== History ==
According to one account, Negro Run was so named when a black woman gave birth while camped along its banks.

== See also ==
- List of rivers of West Virginia
