= Thunderstruck Run =

Stream in West Virginia, U.S.

Coordinates: 39°15′00″N 79°36′06″W

Thunderstruck Run is a stream in the U.S. state of West Virginia.

Thunderstruck Run was named for the fact lightning strikes were relatively common there.

== See also ==
- List of rivers of West Virginia
