= Crane Creek (Bluestone River tributary) =

Stream in West Virginia, U.S.

Coordinates: 37°21′14″N 81°15′14″W

Crane Creek is a stream in the U.S. state of West Virginia. It is a tributary of the Bluestone River.

Crane Creek was named from an incident when a crane was killed near it.

Its tributaries include Belcher Branch.

== See also ==
- List of rivers of West Virginia
