= Ann Run =

Stream in West Virginia, U.S.

Coordinates: 39°17′07″N 80°15′07″W

Ann Run is a stream in the U.S. state of West Virginia. It is located in the town of Bridgeport. In Harrison County.

A variant name was Anne Branch. According to tradition, Ann Run derives its name from Anne Bailey, who paid a visit to the area.

== See also ==
- List of rivers of West Virginia
