= Pigeonroost Run =

Stream in West Virginia, U.S.

Coordinates: 38°57′19″N 80°19′16″W

Pigeonroost Run is a stream in the U.S. state of West Virginia.

Pigeonroost Run was named for the many passenger pigeons that once roosted there.

== See also ==
- List of rivers of West Virginia
