= Isaban, West Virginia =

Isaban
- Unincorporated community
- Location within the state of West Virginia Isaban (the United States)
- Coordinates: 37°31′48″N 81°53′17″W
- Country: United States
- State: West Virginia
- County: McDowell
- Time zone: UTC-5 (Eastern (EST))
  - Summer (DST): UTC-4 (EDT)
- ZIP codes: 24846
- Area code: 304
- GNIS feature ID: 1554783

Isaban is an unincorporated community located on Fourpole Creek, in McDowell and Mingo counties in the U.S. state of West Virginia.

The community's name is an amalgamation of the names Isabel and Ann.
