= Tupper Creek =

Stream in Kanawha county West Virginia, U.S.

Coordinates: 38°30′59″N 81°38′38″W

Tupper Creek is a stream in the U.S. state of West Virginia.

Tupper Creek has the name of a pioneer trapper.

== See also ==
- List of rivers of West Virginia
