= Layfields Run =

Stream in West Virginia, U.S.

Coordinates: 39°16′22″N 81°11′12″W

Layfields Run is a stream in Ritchie County, West Virginia, United States.

Layfields Run was named after William Layfield, a 19th-century early settler.

== See also ==
- List of rivers of West Virginia
