= Files Creek =

Stream in West Virginia, U.S.

Coordinates: 38°50′16″N 79°52′48″W

Files Creek is a stream in the U.S. state of West Virginia.

Files Creek's name derives from Robert Foyle, a pioneer settler.

== See also ==
- List of rivers of West Virginia
