= Panther Creek (Tug Fork) =

Stream in West Virginia, U.S.

Coordinates: 37°28′58″N 81°53′53″W

Panther Creek is a stream in the U.S. state of West Virginia. It is a tributary of the Tug Fork.

Panther Creek was named from an incident when a pioneer killed a panther there.

== See also ==
- List of rivers of West Virginia
