= Skitter Creek =

Stream in West Virginia, U.S.

Coordinates: 37°59′24″N 81°19′53″W

Skitter Creek is a stream in the U.S. state of West Virginia.

Skitter Creek derives its name from the word "skeet" on account of its slippery river bed.

== See also ==
- List of rivers of West Virginia
