= Big Run (North Fork South Branch Potomac River tributary) =

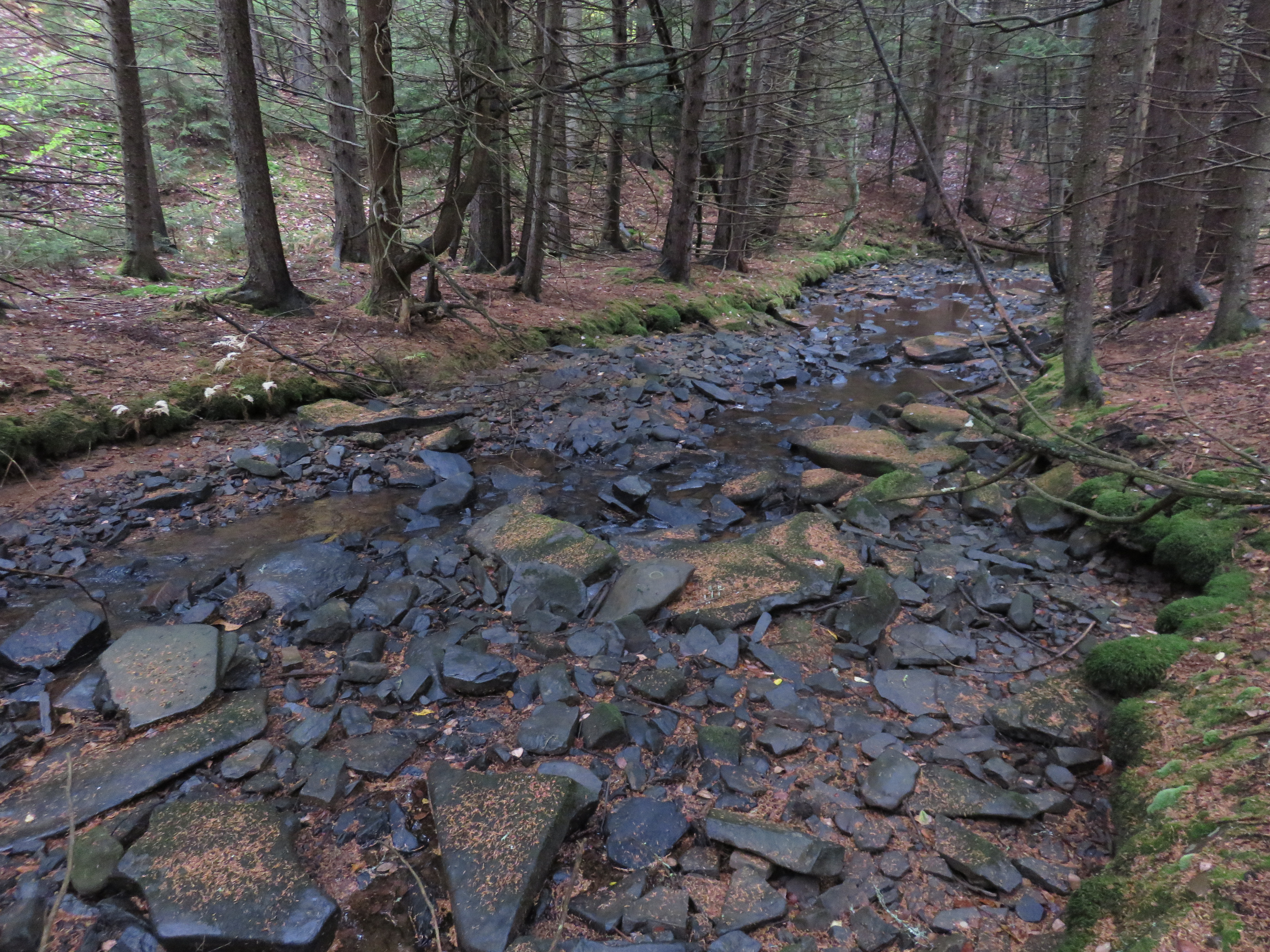
- Big Run, just after it leaves the marshland and enters the forest, below the beaver dam at river mile 12.4. Monongahela National Forest, West Virginia, 8 October 2017

Location
- Country: United States
- State: West Virginia
- County: Pendleton

Physical characteristics
- Source
  - coordinates: 38.711885°N 79.559813°W
- Mouth: North Fork South Branch Potomac River
  - location: Cherry Grove, West Virginia
  - coordinates: 38.637589°N 79.520687°W
- Length: 13 mi (21 km)

Basin features
- GNIS feature ID: 1550331

Big Run is a river of 13 miles in length, located one-and-a-half miles west of Spruce Knob in Monongahela National Forest, in Pendleton County, West Virginia. It is a tributary of the North Fork South Branch Potomac River.

== Description ==
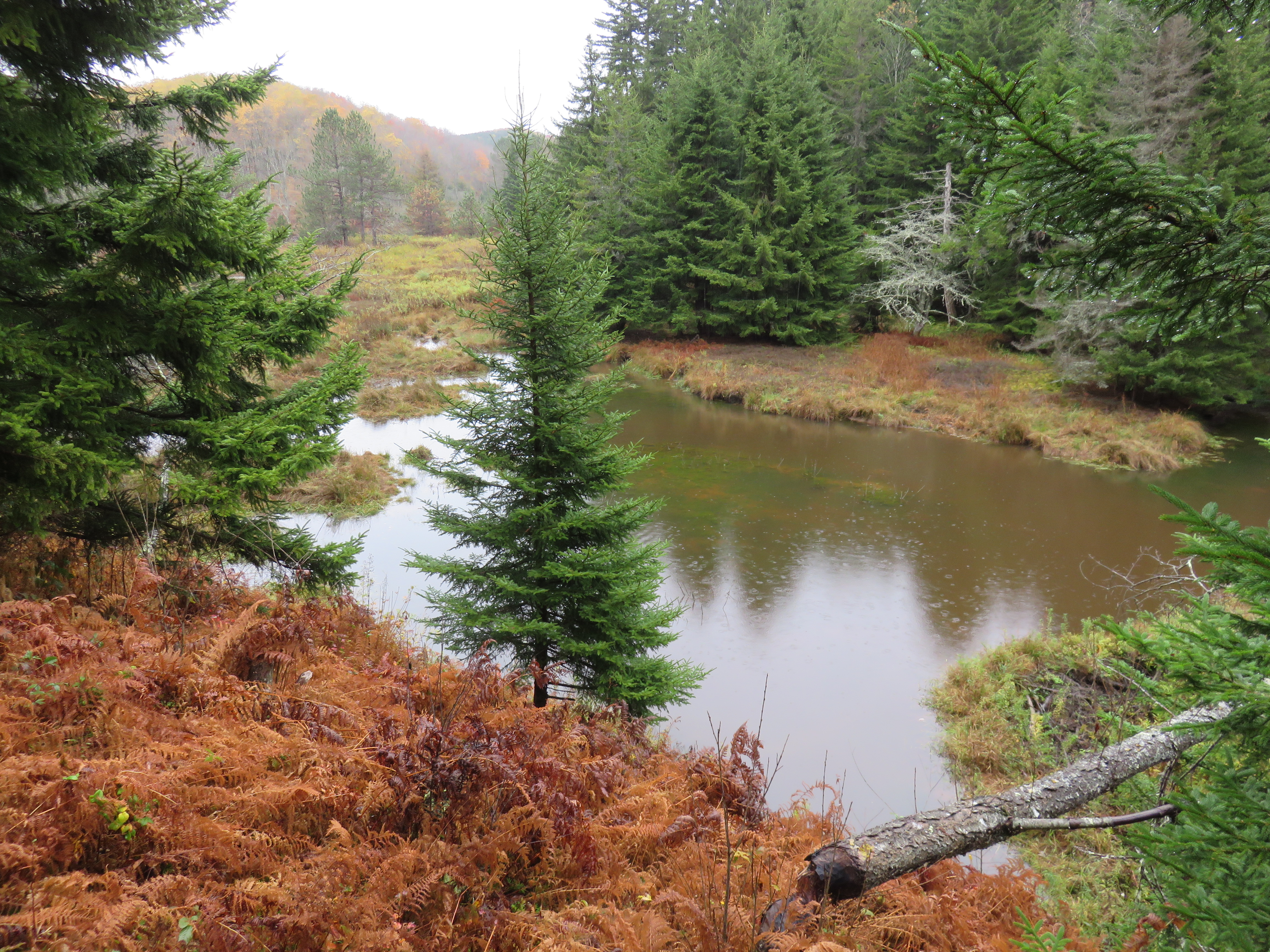
The first beaver pond at the head of the marshland where Big Run originates. The beaver dam is in the lower-right corner. Also in the lower-right is a beaver-felled tree. Monongahela National Forest, West Virginia, 8 October 2017

The river begins as a series of gullies through an open marshland just south of the northernmost bend in Forest Road 112. Between river mile (RM) 12.8 and 12.4, a series of beaver dams causes the valley to transition from wetland into a string of lakes. From the last beaver dam at RM 12.4, a recognizable river emerges. The open field ends and the river enters a forested ravine.

Big Run joins with tributaries Elk Run at RM 5, Teeter Camp Run at RM 3.6 and Sawmill Branch Run at RM 3.2.

The river empties into the North Fork South Branch Potomac River just outside of Cherry Grove, along Snowy Mountain Road just across the bridge over the Potomac.

This is one of a number of Potomac tributaries known as Big Run, including Big Run at Romney and Big Run at Harper.

== Trail access ==
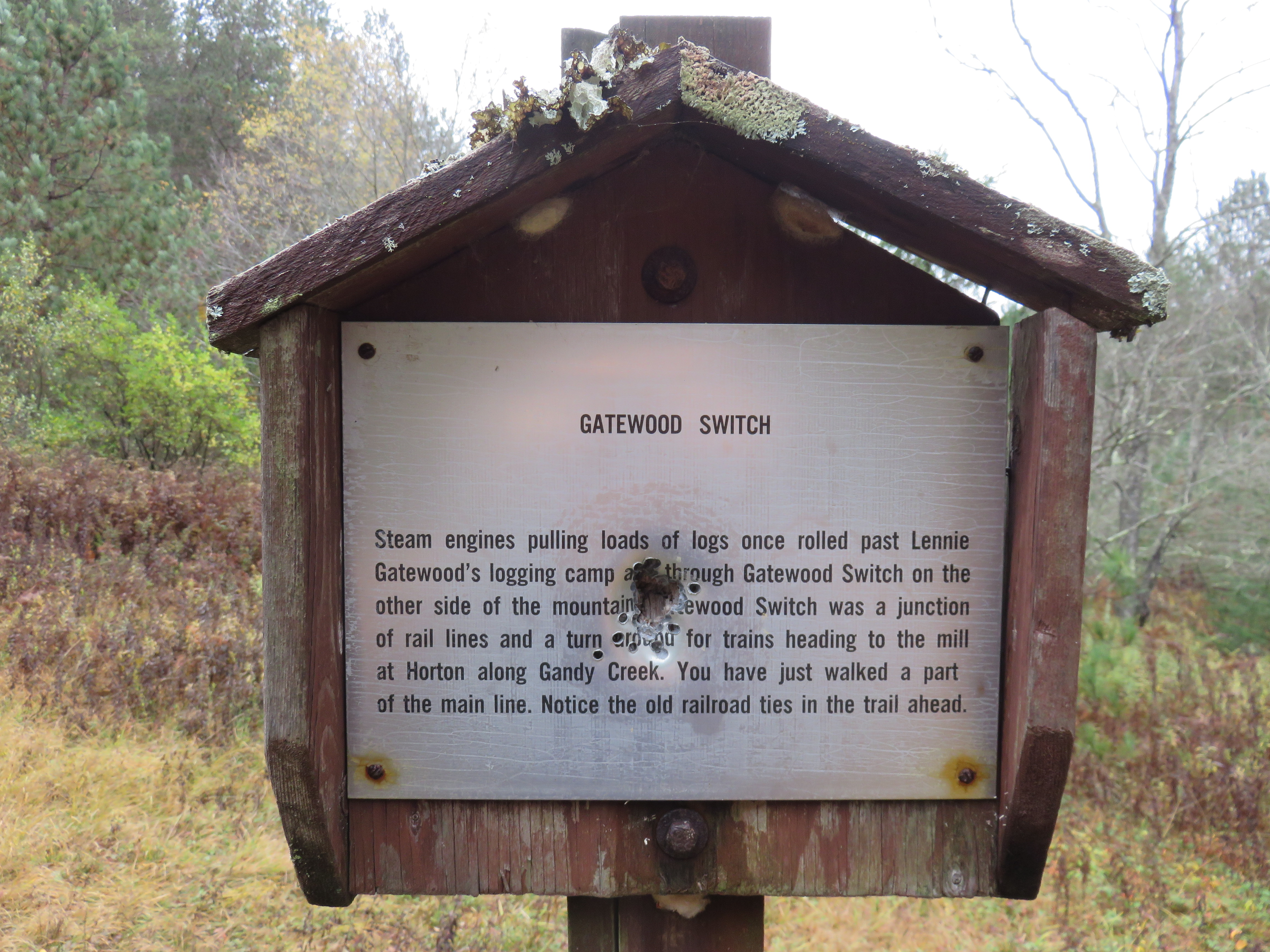
A sign along Big Run Trail (Forest Trail 527). "Gatewood Switch – Steam engines pulling loads of logs once rolled past Lennie Gatewood's logging camp [and] through Gatewood Switch on the other side of the mountain. Gatewood Switch was a junction of rail lines and a turn around for trains heading to the mill at Horton along Gandy Creek. You have just walked a part of the main line. Notice the old railroad ties in the trail ahead." Monongahela National Forest, West Virginia, 8 October 2017

Big Run Trail (Forest Trail 527) runs along the east bank of upper length of Big Run. A portion of the trail is the remnant of the rail line that served Parsons Pulp and Lumber Company at Horton near Gandy Creek. The trail can be accessed from either Gatewood Trail off of Sawmill Run Road / Forest Road 28/10 at RM 10.9 (38°41′25.188″N 79°33′58.6548″W) or the parking lot at the northernmost oxbow of Forest Road 112 (38°42′47.898″N 79°34′5.3544″W).

== Bibliography ==
- Brooks, A. B. (1910). West Virginia Geological Survey, Volume Five: Forestry and Wood Industries. I.C. White, State Geologist, Superintendent of the Survey. Morgantown, W.V.: Acme Publishing Company.
- Lewis, Ronald L. (1998). Transforming the Appalachian Countryside: Railroads, Deforestation, and Social Change in West Virginia, 1880-1920. Chapel Hill, N.C.: University of North Carolina Press. ISBN 0-8078-2405-4.
- Morton, Oren Frederic (1910). A History of Pendleton County, West Virginia. Dayton, Va.: Ruebush-Elkins, Co.
