= Dans Run =

Tributary stream of the North Branch Potomac River in Mineral County, West Virginia

Coordinates: 39.545646°N 78.689739°W

Dans Run is a 2.3-mile-long (3.7 km) non-navigable tributary stream of the North Branch Potomac River in Mineral County, West Virginia. Dans Run rises to the east of Patterson Creek Mountain and empties into the North Branch at the community of Dans Run on the old Baltimore and Ohio Railroad. Dans Run Island in the North Branch Potomac, at its confluence with Dans Run, is also named for the small stream.

== See also ==
- List of rivers of West Virginia
