= Tory Camp Run =

Stream in West Virginia, U.S.

Coordinates: 38°53′35″N 79°32′53″W

Tory Camp Run is a stream in the U.S. state of West Virginia.

Tory Camp Run was named after the Tories from the time of the American Revolution.

== See also ==
- List of rivers of West Virginia
