= Nutter Fork =

Stream in West Virginia, U.S.

Coordinates: 39°19′44″N 80°48′33″W

Nutter Fork is a stream in the U.S. state of West Virginia.

The community was named after one Mr. Nutter, a pioneer who settled there.

== See also ==
- List of rivers of West Virginia
