= Carpenter Run =

Stream in West Virginia, U.S.

Coordinates: 39°21′34″N 81°24′06″W

Carpenter Run is a stream in Wood County, West Virginia.

It is a tributary of the Ohio River. The creek has the name of Nicholas Carpenter who was ambushed by Indians near the site in 1791.

== See also ==
- List of rivers of West Virginia
