= Goosepen Run =

Stream in West Virginia, U.S.

Coordinates: 38°55′36″N 80°34′10″W

Goosepen Run is a stream in the U.S. state of West Virginia.

Goosepen Run was so named on account of the flocks of wild birds which flew over the area.

== See also ==
- List of rivers of West Virginia
