= Geelick Run =

Stream in West Virginia, U.S.

Coordinates: 39°05′30″N 80°28′38″W

Geelick Run is a stream in the U.S. state of West Virginia.

Geelick Run (or G Lick Run) was so named for the fact an early settler carved the letter G carved on a tree along its banks.

== See also ==
- List of rivers of West Virginia
