= Whip Run =

Stream in West Virginia, U.S.

Coordinates: 39°17′24″N 79°02′07″W

Whip Run is a stream in the U.S. state of West Virginia.

Whip Run most likely was named after the local Whip (or Whipp) family.

== See also ==
- List of rivers of West Virginia
