= Henry Branch =

Stream in West Virginia, U.S.

Coordinates: 37°38′56″N 81°54′23″W

Henry Branch is a stream in the U.S. state of West Virginia.

The stream was named after Henry Perry, a pioneer settler.

== See also ==
- List of rivers of West Virginia
