= Anglins Creek =

Stream in West Virginia, U.S.

Coordinates: 38°08′12″N 80°53′09″W

Anglins Creek is a stream in the U.S. state of West Virginia.

Anglins Creek most likely has the name of an early settler. It is known for whitewater rafting.

== See also ==
- List of rivers of West Virginia
