= Herods Run =

Stream in Upshur County, West Virginia, U.S.

Coordinates: 38°48′05″N 80°12′19″W

Herods Run is a stream in Upshur County, West Virginia, in the United States.

The name is probably biblical in origin.

== See also ==
- List of rivers of West Virginia
