= Baltimore Run =

Stream in West Virginia Webster County

Coordinates: 38°30′27″N 80°19′13″W

Baltimore Run is a stream in West Virginia in Webster County.

The community took its name from a pioneer settlement known locally as Baltimore.

== See also ==
- Cherry Run, West Virginia
- List of rivers of West Virginia
