= Kettle Creek (South Fork South Branch Potomac River tributary) =

River in West Virginia, United States

Coordinates: 38.797335°N 79.109756°W

Kettle Creek is a 7.3-mile-long (11.7 km) tributary stream of the South Fork South Branch Potomac River in Hardy and Pendleton counties in West Virginia's Eastern Panhandle. Kettle Creek rises on Mitchell Knob (2,717 feet) and flows north along the eastern flanks of Sweedlin Hill (2,303 feet) through Sweedlin Valley in the George Washington National Forest.

== Tributaries ==
Tributaries are listed from the south (source) to north (mouth).

- Buck Lick Run
  - Lick Run
- Camp Run
- Wilson Run

== See also ==
- List of rivers of West Virginia
