= Buffalo Creek (South Branch Potomac River tributary) =

Tributary stream of the South Branch Potomac River in West Virginia

Coordinates: 39°22′32″N 78°44′25″W

Buffalo Creek is a 4.1-mile-long (6.6 km) free-flowing tributary stream of the South Branch Potomac River, itself a tributary of the Potomac River, making it a part of the Chesapeake Bay watershed. Buffalo Creek is located in west-central Hampshire County in the U.S. state of West Virginia. Because the stream flows through several small farms, Buffalo Creek primarily serves agriculture purposes with segments used for livestock watering.

== History ==
Buffalo Creek and its eponymous hollow were named so during the eighteenth century due to the abundant populations of buffalo in their vicinity. In 1755 at the onset of the French and Indian War, Fort Forman was constructed by Captain William Forman near the banks of Buffalo Creek, and the stream served as the fort's source of water. A historical highway marker along West Virginia Route 28 marks the approximate location of the stockade fort.

== Headwaters and course ==
The stream's headwaters lie along the eastern flanks of South Branch Mountain southwest of Three Churches. From its source, Buffalo Creek meanders in a southwest direction along the forested foot of South Branch Mountain. The stream winds a northwesterly path through a gorge that leads it through the Buffalo Hollow in South Branch Mountain. It is through this hollow that Buffalo Creek parallels Buffalo Hollow Road (West Virginia Secondary State Route 28/1) until its intersection with West Virginia Route 28. Buffalo Creek flows beneath West Virginia Route 28 and the South Branch Valley Railroad at Vance before emptying into the South Branch Potomac River.

== See also ==
- List of West Virginia rivers
