= Doolin Run =

Stream in West Virginia, U.S.

Coordinates: 39.6377°N 80.8370°W

Doolin Run is a stream in the U.S. state of West Virginia.

Doolin Run was named after Edward Doolin, a pioneer who was scalped by Indians.

== See also ==
- List of rivers of West Virginia
