= Lunice Creek =

River in Grant County, West Virginia

Coordinates: 38°59′36″N 79°06′19″W

Lunice Creek is a 7.3-mile-long (11.7 km) tributary of the South Branch Potomac River, belonging to the Potomac River and Chesapeake Bay watersheds. The creek is located in Grant County, West Virginia. Lunice Creek is created by its North and South Forks and empties into the South Branch at Petersburg.

The creek's name most likely is a corruption of Looney('s), the name of an early soldier or settler.

== Tributaries ==
Tributary streams are listed in order from north to south.

- North Fork Lunice Creek
  - Saltblock Run
  - Shell Run
  - Opossum Hollow Run
- South Fork Lunice Creek
  - Big Star Run
    - Little Star Run
  - Bodkins Run
- Brushy Run
- Norman Run
- Robinson Run

== See also ==
- List of West Virginia rivers
