= Spruce Fork =

Stream in West Virginia, U.S.

Coordinates: 38°03′22″N 81°49′20″W

Spruce Fork is a stream in the U.S. state of West Virginia.

Spruce Fork derives its name from Benjamin Sprouse.

== See also ==
- List of rivers of West Virginia
