= Crumpler, West Virginia =

Crumpler
- Census-designated place (CDP)
- Location within the state of West Virginia
- Coordinates: 37°25′29″N 81°20′30″W
- Country: United States
- State: West Virginia
- County: McDowell

Area
  - Total: 1.500 sq mi (3.88 km^{2})
  - Land: 1.500 sq mi (3.88 km^{2})
  - Water: 0 sq mi (0 km^{2})

Population (2020)
  - Total: 151
  - Density: 101/sq mi (38.9/km^{2})
- Time zone: UTC-5 (Eastern (EST))
  - Summer (DST): UTC-4 (EDT)

Crumpler is a census-designated place (CDP) located in McDowell County, West Virginia, United States. As of the 2020 census, its population was 151 (down from 204 at the 2010 census).

== History ==
The community was named after a railroad official.
