= Skin Creek =

River in Lewis County, West Virginia, US

Coordinates: 38°59′53″N 80°28′26″W

Skin Creek is a stream in the U.S. state of West Virginia.

Some believe the stream was named for an incident when animal pelts were washed away during a flood, while others believe a successful hunt near the creek accounts for the name.

== See also ==
- List of rivers of West Virginia
