= Hazy Creek =

Stream in West Virginia, United States

Coordinates: 37°53′03″N 81°32′01″W

Hazy Creek is a stream in the U.S. state of West Virginia.

Hazy Creek was so named because the tree-lined creek experiences relatively little sunshine.

== See also ==
- List of rivers of West Virginia
