= First Creek (St. Francis River tributary) =

Stream in the U.S. state of Missouri

First Creek is a stream in eastern Iron and western St Francois counties in the U.S. state of Missouri. It is a tributary of the St. Francis River. The stream headwaters are at 37°40′01″N 90°39′16″W and the confluence with the St. Francis ia at 37°42′13″N 90°39′07″W. The stream source area lies northwest of Middlebrook and the stream flows northeast to north paralleling Missouri Route W. Just southwest of Iron Mountain the streamcourse veers northwest and re-enters Iron County to its confluence with the St. Francis.

First Creek was named for the fact it is the first in order of tributaries relative to nearby Second Creek.

== See also ==
- List of rivers of Missouri
