= Mill Creek (North Fork South Branch Potomac River tributary) =

River in Pendleton County, West Virginia

Coordinates: 38.787890°N 79.406713°W

Mill Creek is a 5.3-mile-long (8.5 km) tributary stream of the North Fork South Branch Potomac River in Pendleton County, West Virginia. Mill Creek rises on the western flanks of North Fork Mountain (3412 feet/1040 m) and from there, flows north through Germany Valley. Its confluence with the North Fork lies at Hinkle Gap between Germany and Harman Knobs.

== See also ==
- List of rivers of West Virginia
