= Buzzard Run (Missouri) =

Stream in the U.S. state of Missouri

Coordinates: 36°35′44″N 90°36′56″W

Buzzard Run is a stream in Ripley County in the U.S. state of Missouri. It is a tributary of the Little Black River.

The stream headwaters arise at about one mile west of Fairdealing just north of US Route 160 at an elevation of about 475 feet. The stream flows south and east passing under Route 160 and Missouri Route B passing south of Fairdealing. The stream flows generally south meandering under Route B repeatedly and continues to its confluence with the Little Black just north of Missouri Route 142 at at an elevation of 302 feet. The confluence is about 1.5 miles north of Naylor.

Some say Buzzard Run was so named on account of buzzards in the area, while others believe the creek has the name of the local Buzzard family.

== See also ==
- List of rivers of Missouri
