= Diamond, Kanawha County, West Virginia =

Unincorporated community in West Virginia, United States

Diamond, West Virginia
- Unincorporated community
- Location within West Virginia Location within the United States
- Coordinates: 38°12′53″N 81°30′59″W
- Country: United States
- State: West Virginia
- County: Kanawha
- Elevation: 630 ft (190 m)
- Time zone: UTC-5 (Eastern (EST))
  - Summer (DST): UTC-4 (EDT)
- Area codes: 304 & 681
- GNIS feature ID: 1538170

Diamond is an unincorporated community in Kanawha County, West Virginia, United States. Diamond is located on the north bank of the Kanawha River, 1.5 miles (2.4 km) southeast of Belle. The community is served by U.S. Route 60.
