= Stinking Lick Creek =

Stream in West Virginia, U.S.

Coordinates: 37°31′13″N 80°48′52″W

Stinking Lick Creek is a stream in the U.S. state of West Virginia.

Stinking Lick Creek was so named from an incident when the rotting corpse of an animal gave off a foul odor.

== See also ==
- List of rivers of West Virginia
