= Alum Creek (Tug Fork tributary) =

Stream in West Virginia, U.S.

Coordinates: 37°32′32″N 81°59′46″W

Alum Creek is a stream in the U.S. state of West Virginia. It is a tributary of Tug Fork.

The water of Alum Creek is impregnated with alum, hence the name.

== See also ==
- List of rivers of West Virginia
