= First Creek (Pocatalico River tributary) =

Stream in the American state of West Virginia

Coordinates: 38°31′33″N 81°38′53″W

First Creek is a stream in the U.S. state of West Virginia. It is a tributary of the Pocatalico River.

First Creek was the nearest creek to a pioneer settlement, hence the name.

== See also ==
- List of rivers of West Virginia
