= First Creek (Gasconade River tributary) =

Stream in Gasconade County, Missouri, U.S.

Coordinates: 38.6503225°N 91.5712780°W

First Creek is a stream in Gasconade County in the U.S. state of Missouri. It is a tributary of Gasconade River.

First Creek was named for the fact it is the first in order of tributaries on the Gasconade River from the nearby Missouri River.

== See also ==
- List of rivers of Missouri
