= Spruce Creek (West Virginia) =

Stream in West Virginia, U.S.

Coordinates: 39°04′46″N 81°02′10″W

Spruce Creek is a stream in Ritchie County, West Virginia, United States.

Spruce Creek was named for the spruce trees along its course.

== See also ==
- List of rivers of West Virginia
