= Kincheloe (surname) =

Kincheloe is an American surname derived from Kinsella, an Irish name. Notable people with the surname include:

- David Hayes Kincheloe (1877–1950), U.S. Representative from Kentucky
- Iven Carl Kincheloe, Jr. (1928–1958), American test pilot, recipient of the Silver Star and Distinguished Flying Cross, and a double ace in the Korean War
- Joe L. Kincheloe (1950–2008), American scholar of education and pedagogy

== Fictional characters ==
- Sgt. James (aka Ivan) "Kinch" Kinchloe, a character on Hogan's Heroes

== See also ==
- Kinchlow, surname
