= Sitlington Creek =

River in Pocahontas County, West Virginia

Coordinates: 38°21′34″N 79°55′28″W

Sitlington Creek is a tributary of the Greenbrier River in Pocahontas County, West Virginia. It was once an important stream for sending trimmed logs of white pine down the river to the St. Lawrence Boom and Lumber Company. It drains west where the confluence into the Greenbrier sits between Deer Creek and Clover Creek.

The creek was named after Robert Sitlington, a pioneer settler. Historic variant names include Setlington, Sitlington's, Stetlington, Stetlingtons, and Suttleton Creek.

== See also ==
- List of rivers of West Virginia
