= Buzzard Run (Lynncamp Run tributary) =

Stream in Ritchie County, West Virginia, United States

Coordinates: 39°14′18″N 80°55′52″W

- Interactive map of Buzzard Run
- Location: Ritchie County, West Virginia
- Type: Stream
- Primary outflows: Lynncamp Run
- Surface elevation: 240 metres (790 ft)

Buzzard Run is a stream located entirely within Ritchie County, West Virginia. It is a tributary of Lynncamp Run.

Buzzard Run was descriptively named by the Native Americans.

== See also ==
- List of rivers of West Virginia
