= Bonds Creek =

Stream in West Virginia, U.S.

Coordinates: 39°13′41″N 81°06′53″W

Bonds Creek is a stream in the U.S. state of West Virginia. It is a tributary to North Fork Hughes River.

Bonds Creek was named in honor of Lewis Bond.

== See also ==
- List of rivers of West Virginia
