= Big Run (South Branch Potomac River tributary) =

Tributary stream of the South Branch Potomac River in West Virginia

Coordinates: 39°21′50″N 78°45′21″W

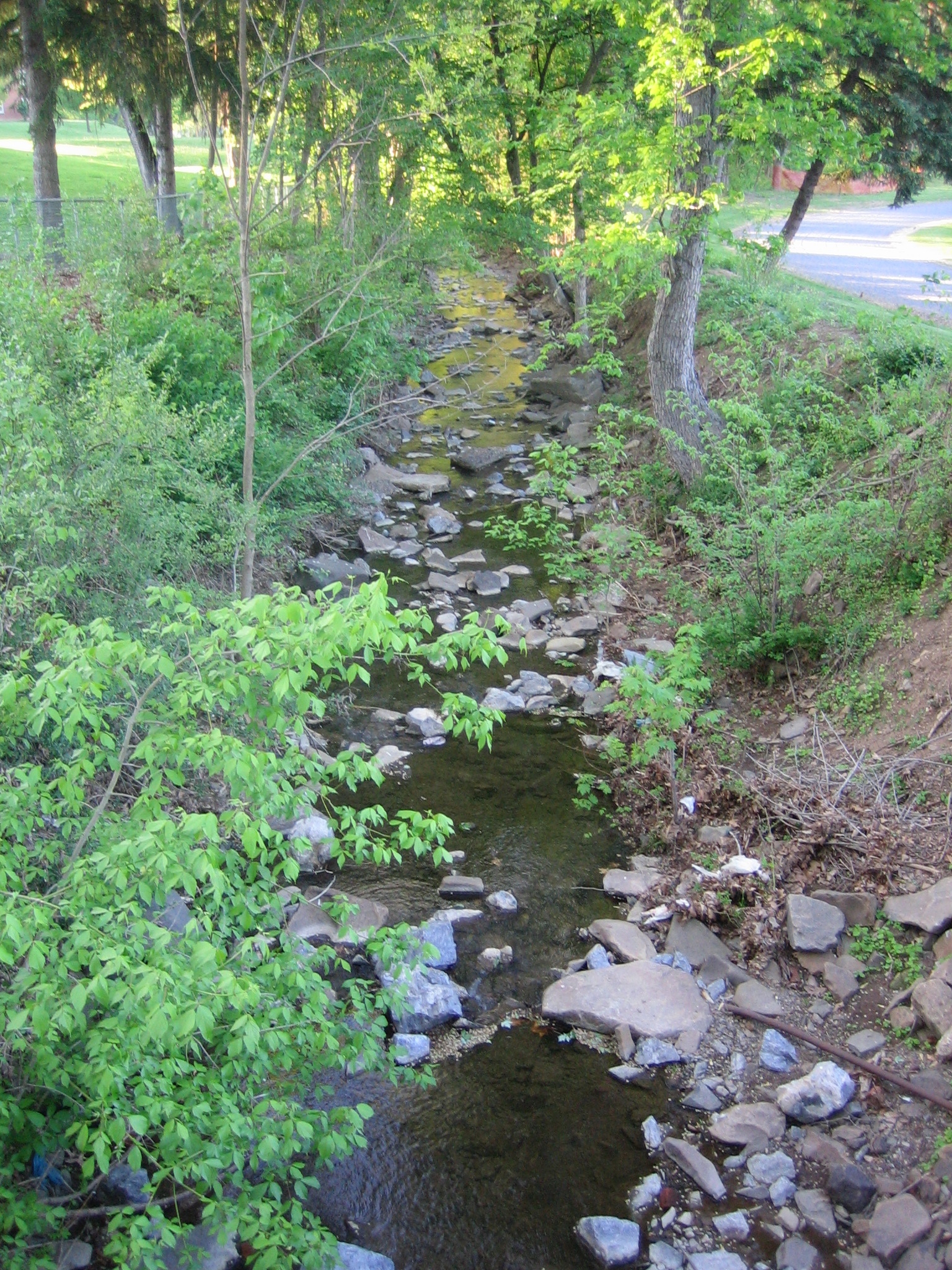
Big Run on the WVSDB Campus

Big Run is a 4.4-mile-long (7.1 km) tributary stream of the South Branch Potomac River, belonging to the Potomac River and Chesapeake Bay watersheds. Big Run flows through the city of Romney and the campus of the West Virginia Schools for the Deaf and Blind in Hampshire County, West Virginia. The stream is known by local residents as Town Run and Town Creek.

== Headwaters and course ==
Big Run rises on the western flanks of South Branch Mountain to the east of Romney. From its source, the stream parallels the Northwestern Turnpike (U.S. Route 50) as it travels down the mountain. From the base of South Branch Mountain, Big Run flows under Grassy Lick Road (County Route 10) and beneath the old Miller's Market store followed by US 50. Once it flows north of US 50, Big Run meanders around the Koolwink Motel and continues to parallel the highway. On its northwestern track, the stream trickles through a number of residential communities before entering the grounds of the West Virginia Schools for the Deaf and Blind. At the WVSDB, Big Run serves as a forested scenic stream that meanders through the school's grounds. As of 2008, the old dam behind the school's maintenance buildings remains.

From the school, Big Run continues to the northwest by the community's Little League baseball field and below Romney's Savilla-Vale neighborhood. After it flows beneath High Street (West Virginia Route 28), Big Run parallels WV 28 moving northward and passes through the Hampshire County Industrial Park. It then flows beneath the South Branch Valley Railroad and passes the old "Cold Storage" facility and Wappocomo farm before it empties into the South Branch Potomac River.

== Flora ==
Trees along the creek's path include white oak (Quercus alba), Pin oak (Quercus palustris), Silver maple (Acer saccharinum), Sugar maple (Acer saccharum), Virginia pine (Pinus virginiana), Eastern hemlock (Tsuga canadensis), American tulip tree (Liriodendron tulipifera), and American sycamore (Platanus occidentalis).

== Bridges ==
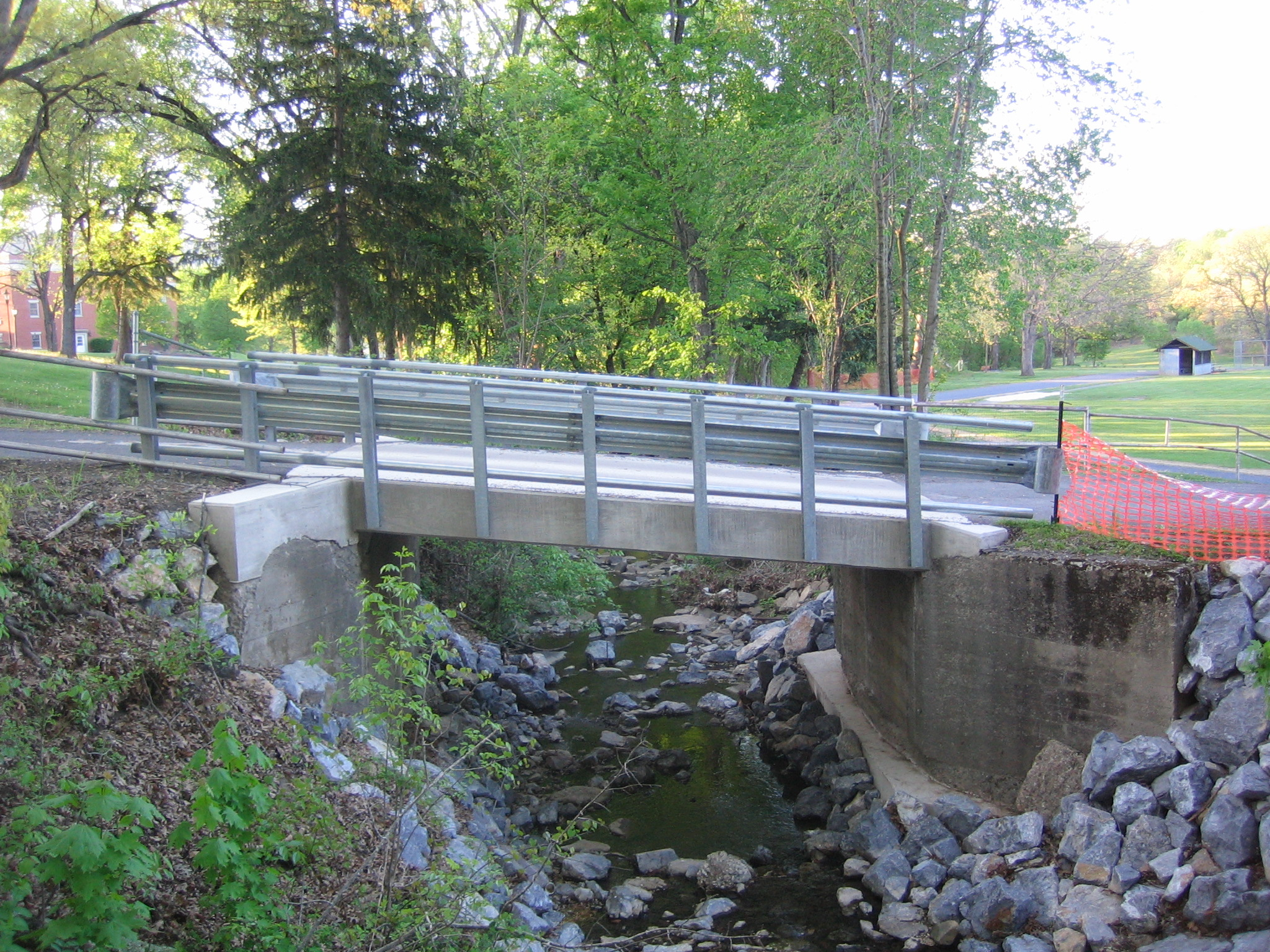
Pedestrian Bridge over Big Run on the WVSDB Campus

| Bridge | Route | Location |
|---|---|---|
| Bridge at Grassy Lick Road | Grassy Lick Road (CR 10) | Romney |
| US 50 Bridge | Northwestern Turnpike (US 50) | Romney |
| Bridge at Koolwink | Koolwink Driveway | Romney |
| Pedestrian Bridge | WVSDB walkway | Romney |
| Quail Drive Bridge | WVSDB road | Romney |
| High Street Bridge | High Street (WV 28) | Romney |
| CR 28/16 Bridge | Industrial Park Road (CR 28/16) | Romney |
| Wooden Trestle | South Branch Valley Railroad | Romney |

== See also ==
- List of rivers of West Virginia
