= First Creek (Second Creek tributary) =

Stream in Missouri, U.S.

Coordinates: 39.3725000°N 94.5918997°W

First Creek is a stream in the U.S. state of Missouri. It is a tributary of Second Creek.

First Creek was so named for the fact it is the closest stream to a nearby drainage divide.

== See also ==
- List of rivers of Missouri
