= Horseshoe run =

The Horseshoe run of the Union Steam Ship Company carried passengers and cargo between Australian and New Zealand ports in the late 19th century. Several ships were used from 1882 for about 15 years: the SS Hauroto, the SS Manapouri, the SS Tarawera, and the SS Wairarapa:

Sailing from Port Chalmers, she (the Hauroto) made calls at Lyttelton, Wellington, Napier, Gisborne, and Auckland; also at Opua for bunkers (ie coal) en route to Sydney, returning via the same ports to Port Chalmers then continuing on to Bluff, Hobart, and Melbourne, then returning to Port Chalmers. After a few years all the North Island ports except Wellington were omitted.

In the early 1890s there was a battle between the Union Co and Huddart Parker on various Australasian routes including the Melbourne-Hobart route, with undercutting by cheap fares and steamers shadowing each other from port to port.

On 29 October 1894, the SS Wairarapa wrecked on Great Barrier Island north east of Auckland. Sailing in a dense fog at high speed, the ship rammed into the cliffs at Miner's Point. The hull was breached and the ship immediately started listing. Only 50 passengers and crewmen survived the wreck; 121 were lost. An inquiry later blamed the captain for maintaining excessive speed.
