= Alum Creek (Coal River tributary) =

Stream in West Virginia, U.S.

Coordinates: 38°17′04″N 81°48′15″W

Alum Creek is a stream in the U.S. state of West Virginia. It is a tributary of Coal River. The creek was named for an alum deposit along its course.

== See also ==
- List of rivers of West Virginia
