= Alum Creek (South Dakota) =

Stream in South Dakota, U.S.

Coordinates: 43°10′20″N 103°57′22″W

Alum Creek is a stream in the U.S. state of South Dakota.

Alum Creek received its name on account of the naturally occurring bitter river water.

== See also ==
- List of rivers of South Dakota
