= Hardscrabble, Virginia =

Unincorporated community in Virginia, United States

- Unincorporated community
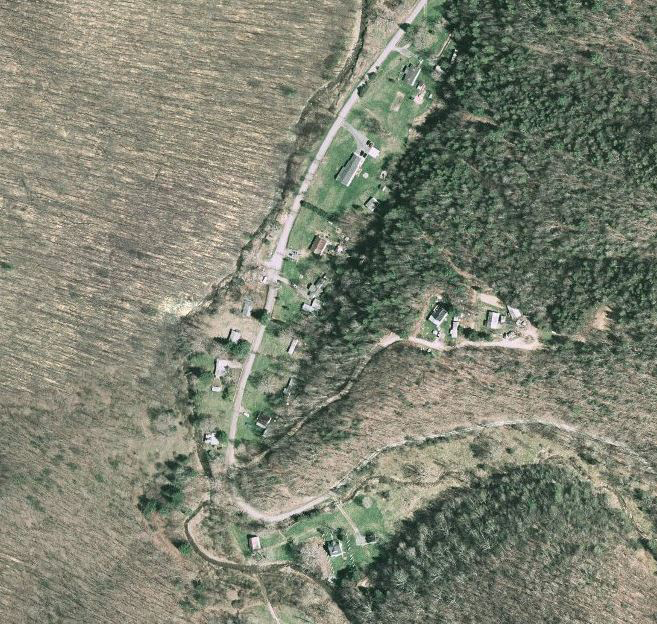
- Aerial view of Hardscrabble, Virginia

- Location within Virginia Location within the United States
- Coordinates: 38°33′41″N 79°34′23″W
- Country: United States
- State: Virginia
- County: Highland
- Elevation: 2,566 ft (782 m)
- Time zone: UTC-5 (Eastern (EST))
  - Summer (DST): UTC-4 (EDT)
- ZIP code: 24413
- Area code: 540
- GNIS feature ID: 1499527

Hardscrabble is an unincorporated community in Highland County, Virginia, United States. Hardscabble is located 10.3 miles (16.6 km) north of Monterey, near the border with West Virginia. The community is situated along the Straight Fork in the Alleghany Valley.
