= Grave Creek (West Virginia) =

Stream in West Virginia, U.S.

Coordinates: 39°54′21″N 80°45′28″W

Grave Creek is a stream in the U.S. state of West Virginia.

Grave Creek was named for a nearby Native American burial site known as the Grave Creek Mound.

== See also ==
- List of rivers of West Virginia
