= Kincheloe Creek =

Stream in West Virginia, U.S.

Coordinates: 39°08′19″N 80°27′17″W

Kincheloe Creek is a stream in the U.S. state of West Virginia.

The creek was named after the local Kincheloe family.

== See also ==
- List of rivers of West Virginia
