= List of forts in Washington County, Pennsylvania =

This article is a list of forts in Washington County, Pennsylvania. During the colonial era and the American Revolution, Washington County, Pennsylvania was on the American Frontier. The forts provided protection for settlers from attacks by Indians who already lived in the area.

== Doddridge's Fort ==
Doddridge's Fort
- Location within Pennsylvania
- 40.24851°N 80.47213°W
- Location: Pa. 844 west of Pa. 231 at Sugar Run Road, 2.5 miles (4.0 km) west of West Middletown, Pennsylvania

History
- Built: circa 1773

Doddridge's Fort was a series of stockaded log cabins in Washington County, Pennsylvania. It was built c. 1773 by John Doddridge as a refuge for settlers in area, which was then the American frontier. The fort was located in present-day Independence Township, Washington County, Pennsylvania. The attack on Doddridge's Fort was recorded in historian's Samuel Kercheval 1883 history A History of the Valley of Virginia.

The fort was a frequent stop for Methodist circuit riders, including Francis Asbury. It was also the childhood home of priest-physician Joseph Doddridge, author of the widely cited Notes on the Settlement and Indian Wars of the Western Parts of Virginia and Pennsylvania, and his brother Philip Doddridge, a leading advocate for democratization on behalf of western Virginians.

On May 28, 1947, the Pennsylvania Historical & Museum Commission erected a historical marker at Pa. 844 west of Pa. 231 at Sugar Run Road, 2.5 miles (4.0 km) west of West Middletown, Pennsylvania, noting the importance of Doddridge's Fort to the history of the commonwealth. The actual location of the fort was north of the marker.

In 2003, plans were developed for the Washington County Historical Society to create a replica of Doddridge's Fort at Cross Creek County Park. The facility was to have been known as The Washington County Frontier Experience Center.

== Lindley's Fort ==
Lindley's Fort was a blockhouse established by frontier settler Demas Lindley near Ten Mile Creek in what is now the village of Prosperity in Morris Township, Washington County.

County historian Alfred Creigh described it as "one of the strongest forts in the western country, because it most exposed to the hostile incursions of the savage inhabitants." Frontier settlers erected additional cabins near the fort as temporary homes during times of increased danger in order to easily retreat with the fort's walls.

In 2011, Lindley's Fort became the subject of dispute. Archaeologists and local historians expressed concern that natural gas extraction operator Range Resources planned to construct a drilling pad access road through the historic site.

== Miller's Blockhouse ==
Miller's Blockhouse
- Location within Pennsylvania
- 40.10934°N 80.49506°W
- Location: U.S. 40, 3.5 miles (5.6 km) west of Claysville

History
- Built: circa 1780

Miller's Blockhouse was a blockhouse built in about 1780 by Jacob Miller Sr., a pioneer in American Frontier in present-day Washington County, Pennsylvania. The fort served to protect settlers in the Dutch Fork area from Indian attacks. On March 31, 1782, the fort was attacked, and Ann Hupp led a heroic defense.

On Wednesday, May 28, 1947, the Pennsylvania Historical & Museum Commission erected a historical marker on U.S. 40, 3.5 miles (5.6 km) west of Claysville, noting the importance of Miller's Blockhouse to the history of Pennsylvania. The actual site of the blockhouse is 3 miles (4.8 km) north.

== Rice's Fort ==
Rice's Fort
- Location within Pennsylvania
- 40.12103°N 80.47432°W
- Location: U.S. 40 at Lake Road, 3.5 miles (5.6 km) west of Claysville

Rice's Fort was a fortified blockhouse in present-day Washington County, Pennsylvania. During the American Revolution, it was built by Abraham Rice along Buffalo Creek. In September 1782, the occupants successfully held off a siege by Indians. The attack on Rice's Fort was recorded in historian's Samuel Kercheval 1883 history A History of the Valley of Virginia.

In 1973, the Pennsylvania Historical & Museum Commission erected a historical marker at U.S. 40 at Lake Road, 3.5 miles (5.6 km) west of Claysville, noting the importance of Rice's Fort to the history of Pennsylvania.

== Wolff's Fort ==
Wolff's Fort
- Location within Pennsylvania
- 40.15056°N 80.32347°W
- Location: U.S. 40, 3.3 miles (5.3 km) southwest of Washington

History
- Built: circa 1780

Wolff's Fort was a stockaded log house built in about 1780 by Jacob Wolfe. The Pennsylvania Historical & Museum Commission describes it as "one of the most important forts in the area."

On May 28, 1947, the Pennsylvania Historical & Museum Commission erected a historical marker at U.S. 40, 3.3 miles (5.3 km) southwest of Washington, noting the importance of Wolff's Fort to the history of Pennsylvania.
