= David Bradford House =

Historic house in Pennsylvania, United States

- U.S. National Register of Historic Places
- U.S. National Historic Landmark
- Pennsylvania state historical marker
- Washington County History & Landmarks Foundation Landmark
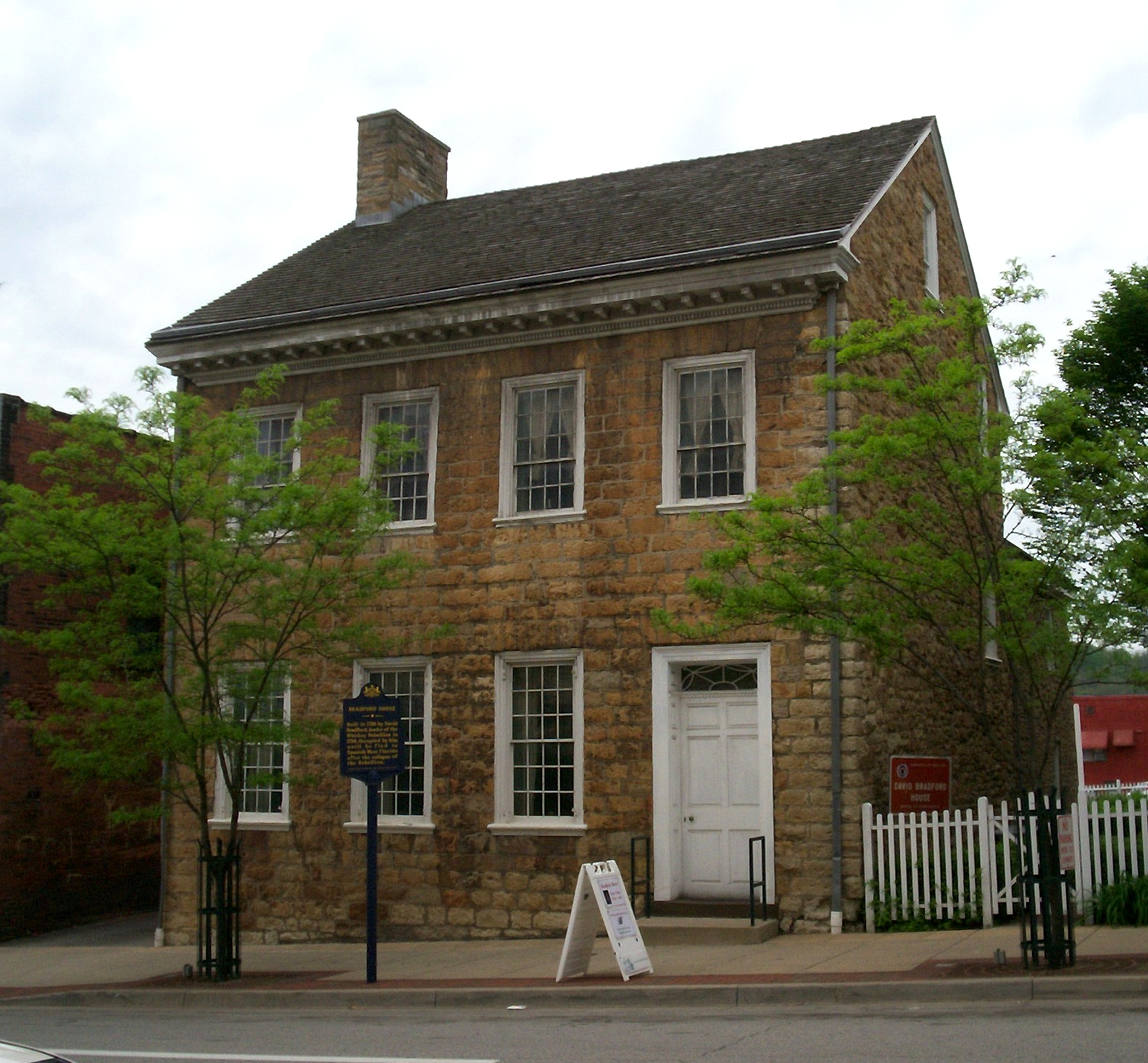
- David Bradford House, from across South Main Street

- Location within Pennsylvania Location within the United States
- Interactive map showing David Bradford House’s location
- Location: 175 South Main Street, Washington, Pennsylvania
- Coordinates: 40°10′5″N 80°14′42″W
- Area: less than one acre
- Built: 1788
- Architect: David Bradford
- Architectural style: Late German Colonial
- NRHP reference No.: 73001668

Significant dates
- Added to NRHP: July 16, 1973
- Designated NHL: July 28, 1983
- Designated PHMC: August 01, 1953

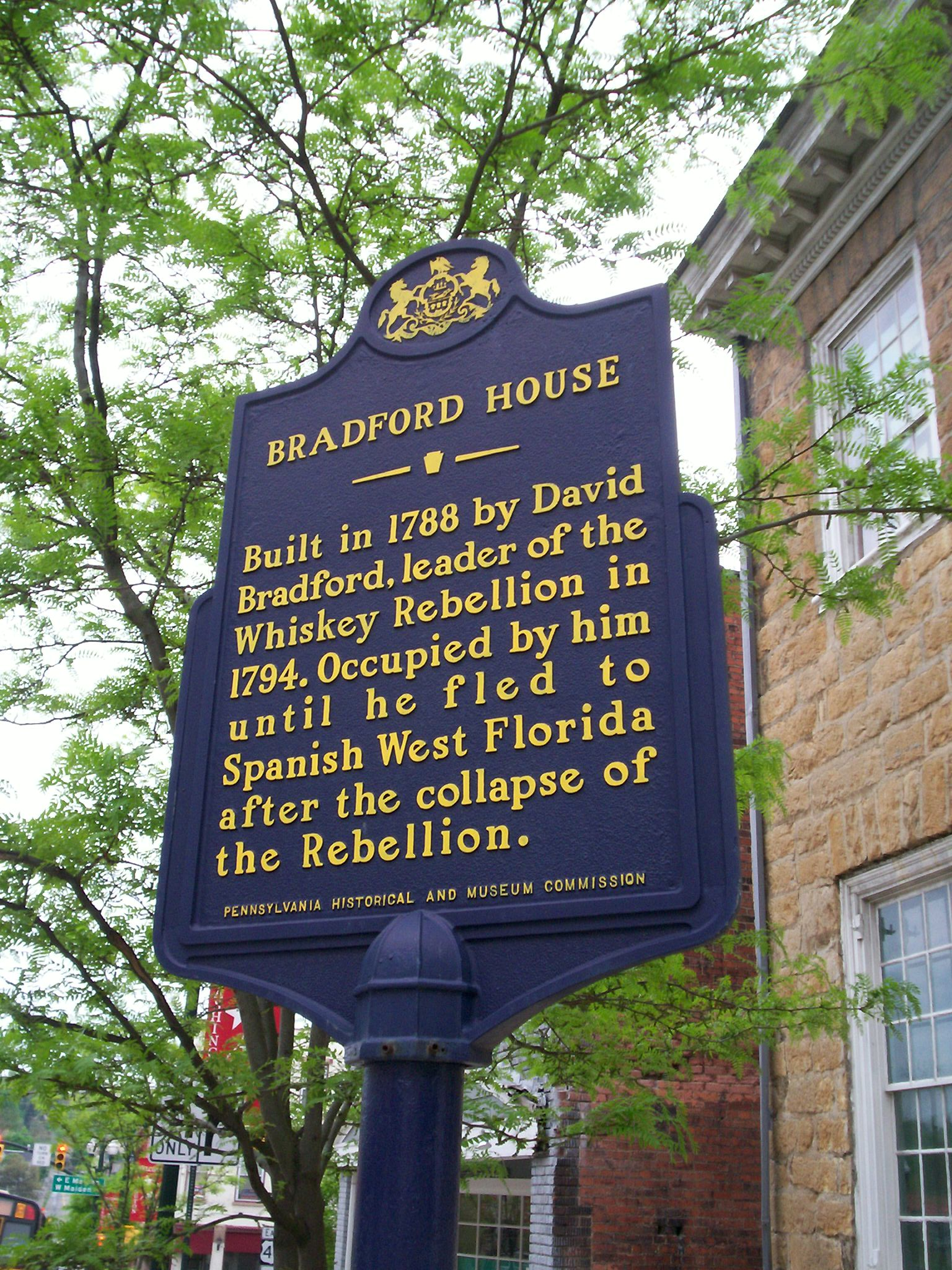
The Pennsylvania state historical marker outside the David Bradford House.

The David Bradford House is a historic house museum at 175 South Main Street in Washington, Pennsylvania. Completed in 1788, it was the home of David Bradford, a leader of the Whiskey Rebellion. It has both architectural and historic importance, and was designated a National Historic Landmark in 1983. It is open weekly between April and November, or by appointment.

== History ==
The house was built by David Bradford, a successful lawyer and deputy attorney-general for Washington County, Pennsylvania who would later become a leader in the Whiskey Rebellion. It was the first stone house on South Main Street in Washington, Pennsylvania in 1788, which, by frontier standards, ranked as a mansion. The two-story building was built in the Georgian style, with dressed stone four-bay windows. The house has side hall entry with a fanlight transom. The stairway was solid mahogany; the mantel-pieces and other interior furnishings, imported from Philadelphia, were transported across the Alleghenies at considerable expense. While restoring the house a secret underground passage was discovered leading to a nearby ravine. This tunnel was presumably used as an escape route in the event of an attack on the house.

Bradford and his family occupied the house only for 6 years, until 1794, when he fled following the Whiskey Rebellion.

It was in this home that author Rebecca Harding Davis was born on June 24, 1831.

A historical marker honoring her a few blocks away was the first dedicated to a woman in Washington, Pennsylvania.

By the 1930s, the building was in such disrepair that Charles Morse Stotz did not include the building in his The Early Architecture of Western Pennsylvania. However, by the book's 2nd printing in 1966, Stotz himself has led the rehabilitation. Among other extensive modifications, a storefront had added to the house.

In 1953, the Pennsylvania Historical and Museum Commission installed a historical marker noting the historic importance of the building. In 1959, the Pennsylvania Historical and Museum Commission assumed control of the house and supervised restoration of its eighteenth-century design. They installed furnishings of that time in Pennsylvania that they felt reflected Bradford's place in society. A management agreement was signed in 1982, turning the management of the Bradford House over to the Bradford House Historical Association. The museum is open from early May through mid December, giving group tours and hosting other special events.

The home was listed on the National Register of Historic Places in 1973 and was declared a National Historic Landmark in 1983. It is also designated as a historic public landmark by the Washington County History & Landmarks Foundation.

== See also ==
- List of National Historic Landmarks in Pennsylvania
- National Register of Historic Places listings in Washington County, Pennsylvania
