= List of Pennsylvania state historical markers in Washington County =

Location of Washington County in Pennsylvania

This is a list of the Pennsylvania state historical markers in Washington County.

This is intended to be a complete list of the official state historical markers placed in Washington County, Pennsylvania by the Pennsylvania Historical and Museum Commission (PHMC). The locations of the historical markers, as well as the latitude and longitude coordinates as provided by the PHMC's database, are included below when available. There are 53 historical markers located in Washington County.

== Historical markers ==
Marker title	Image	Date dedicated	Location	Marker type	Topics
"Declaration and Address"		June 19, 1994	122 South Main Street, Washington; 40.16905°N 80.24487°W	City	Religion
"S" Bridge		May 28, 1947	National Road (US 40), at PA 221, 5 miles southwest of Washington; 40.1398°N 80.3491°W	Roadside	Bridges, Roads, Transportation
1948 Donora Smog		October 28, 1995	Meldon Ave. (Pa. 837) at Fifth St., Donora; 40.1763°N 79.85538°W	Roadside	Environment
Augusta Town		May 28, 1947	National Road (US 40), 3 miles southwest of Washington; 40.151533°N 80.316133°W	Roadside	Government & Politics, Government & Politics 18th Century
Bradford House		August 1, 1953	175 South Main Street, Washington; 40.16813°N 80.24475°W	City	Buildings, Houses & Homesteads, Military, Whiskey Rebellion
Bradford House		April 7, 1966	At site, 175 South Main Street, Washington (retired)	Roadside	Buildings, Houses & Homesteads, Military, Whiskey Rebellion
California Boatyards		June 18, 1994	Borough library (old railroad station), Wood Street, California; 40.06818°N 79.88927°W	City	Business & Industry, Transportation
Capt. Philo McGiffin		May 28, 1947	County Courthouse, Main & Beau Streets, Washington; 40.1707°N 80.24558°W	Roadside	Military, Military Post-Civil War
Cement City		October 4, 1997	McKean Avenue (PA 837) & Chestnut Street, Donora; 40.16798°N 79.86203°W	Roadside	Business & Industry, Labor
Col. George Morgan		May 28, 1947	Morganza Road and West McMurray Road, Canonsburg; 40.27352°N 80.15832°W	Roadside	Government & Politics, Government & Politics 19th Century, Native American, Professions & Vocations
Cross Creek Church		October 16, 1950	Cross Creek Road & Vance Drive, east of PA 18, Cross Creek; 40.329600°N 80.412600°W	Roadside	Ethnic & Immigration, Religion
David Reed		May 9, 1950	PA 50, 3 miles west of PA 980, near Venice; 40.31485°N 80.2692°W	Roadside	Early Settlement, Ethnic & Immigration, George Washington
Delvin G. Miller (1913-1996)		August 1, 2009	Entrance to The Meadows Racetrack and Casino, 210 Racetrack Road, Washington; 40.21621°N 80.201794°W	Roadside	Sports
Doddridge's Fort		May 28, 1947	Washington Pike (PA 844) at Sugar Run Road, 2.5 miles west of Middletown; 40.248467°N 80.472250°W	Roadside	American Revolution, Military
Edward Acheson		August 1, 1953	Southwest corner of Main & Maiden Streets, Washington; 40.16773°N 80.24488°W	City	Invention, Medicine & Science, Professions & Vocations
Elisha McCurdy		May 28, 1947	SR 4004 (old US 22) near Pa. 18, Florence; 40.43207°N 80.4359°W	Roadside	Religion
Gantz Oil Well		October 3, 1953	West Chestnut Street at Brookside Avenue, Washington; 40.171117°N 80.255467°W	City	Business & Industry, Oil & Gas
George Washington		May 9, 1950	Southview Road, north of PA 150, Venice; 40.3252°N 80.2697°W	Roadside	Early Settlement, George Washington, Government & Politics, Government & Politics 18th Century
Globe Inn		August 1, 1953	155 South Main Street, Washington; 40.168333°N 80.244717°W	City	Buildings, Business & Industry, Roads, Inns & Taverns
Hill Church		January 7, 1949	US 19, 5 miles northeast of Washington (Missing)	Roadside	Buildings, Early Settlement, Religion
Hill's Tavern		June 1952	US 40 and Fava Farm Road, Scenery Hill; 40.086067°N 80.070183°W	Roadside	Buildings, Business & Industry, Roads, Inns & Taverns
James G. Blaine		May 28, 1947	238 Main Street, West Brownsville; 40.026233°N 79.886967°W	Roadside	Government & Politics, Government & Politics 19th Century
Jay Livingston (1915-2001)		October 7, 2004	South McDonald Street (PA 980) and Panhandle Trail, McDonald; 40.36663°N 80.23478°W	Roadside	Motion Pictures & Television, Music & Theater, Writers
John K. Tener (1863-1946)		September 1, 1999	7th & Fallowfield Streets, Charleroi; 40.140096°N 80.23478°W	Roadside	Baseball, Ethnic & Immigration, Government & Politics, Governors, Sports
John McMillan		January 7, 1949	US 19 near PA 519, south of Canonsburg; 40.24192°N 80.17808°W	Roadside	Education, Religion
Joseph A. "Jock" Yablonski (1910-1969)		November 4, 1995	3rd & Wood Streets, California; 40.06662°N 79.88982°W	Roadside	Coal, Government & Politics 20th Century, Labor
LeMoyne Crematory		August 1, 1953	Opposite 815 South Main Street, south end of Washington; 40.16057°N 80.23785°W	City	Buildings, Business & Industry
LeMoyne House		August 1, 1953	49 East Maiden Street, Washington; 40.16798°N 80.24327°W	City	Buildings, Houses & Homesteads, Medicine & Science, Professions & Vocations
McDonald Oil Field		August 1, 1953	At Heritage Park, PA 980 west of 6th Street, Washington; 40.366467°N 80.241067°W	City	Buildings, Houses & Homesteads, Medicine & Science, Professions & Vocations
The McGugin Gas Well		January 6, 1967	PA 18 northwest of Washington (MISSING)	Roadside	Business & Industry, Oil & Gas
Meadowcroft Rockshelter		September 19, 1999	401 Meadowcroft Road, Avella; 40.28635°N 80.489°W	Roadside	Native American
Miller's Blockhouse		May 28, 1947	US 40, 3.5 miles west of Claysville; 40.109300°N 80.495000°W	Roadside	American Revolution, Early Settlement, Forts, Military, Native American
Mingo Creek Church		March 4, 1994	PA 88 & Mingo Church Road, 2 miles south of Finleyville; 40.23015°N 79.99583°W	Roadside	Military, Religion, Whiskey Rebellion
Monongahela		May 28, 1947	PA 136 at the Monogahela River Bridge (MISSING)	Roadside	Cities & Towns, Early Settlement, Transportation
Monongahela		May 28, 1947	PA 136 at Chess Street, in small park 40.20608°N 79.93975°W	Roadside	Cities & Towns, Early Settlement, Transportation
Monongahela		May 28, 1947	Main Street (PA 88) at 5th Street at Municipal Building, Monongahela; 40.2039°N 79.92763°W	Roadside	Cities & Towns, Early Settlement, Transportation
Monongahela		May 28, 1947	PA 88 at 7th Street, in Monongahela's Chess Park; 40.2049°N 79.93118°W	Roadside	Cities & Towns, Early Settlement, Transportation
The Mounds		July 15, 1948	Memorial Park, Mounds & Indiana Streets, Monongahela; 40.19855°N 79.93258°W	City	Native American
National Road		April 1, 1949	National Road (US 40), 3.6 miles southwest of Washington; 40.14998°N 80.32803°W	Roadside	Government & Politics, Roads, Transportation
Ralston Thresher		May 28, 1947	PA 844 at West Middletown; 40.242883°N 80.429733°W	Roadside	Agriculture, Business & Industry, Invention
Rebecca Harding Davis		April 13, 2013	Lincoln Street near Strawberry Alley, Washington & Jefferson College, Washington; 40.16931°N 80.24079°W	City	Ethnic & Immigration, Labor, Women, Writers
Reverend John McMillan		n/a	Junction US 19 & PA 519, south of Canonsburg; 40.24202°N 80.17797°W	Plaque	Education, Religion
Rice's Fort		1973	National Road (US 40) at Lake Road, 3.5 miles west of Claysville; 40.121000°N 80.474167°W	Roadside	American Revolution, Forts, Military, Native American
Toll House		March 14, 1947	National Road (US 40), .8 mile west of Claysville (MISSING)	Roadside	Government & Politics 19th Century, Roads, Transportation
Washington		May 28, 1947	Murtland Avenue (US 19) at North Avenue, northeast edge of Washington; 40.18047°N 80.23575°W	Roadside	Cities & Towns, George Washington, Native American, Roads
Washington		May 28, 1947	US 40 W on ramp at junction of I-70 (MISSING)	Roadside	Cities & Towns, George Washington, Native American, Roads
Washington		May 28, 1947	National Road (US 40) near Coffey's Crossing Road (PA 526), west of Washington, near Finney; 40.15002°N 80.32797°W	Roadside	Cities & Towns, George Washington, Native American, Roads
Washington		May 28, 1947	PA 136, East Beau Street @ Clare Drive, near Junction of I-70 and I-79; 40.179562°N 80.225137°W	Roadside	Buildings, Cities & Towns, Early Settlement, George Washington, Native American, Transportation
Washington and Jefferson College		February 2, 1954	At main building, opposite 27 College Avenue, and Beau Street between College and Lincoln, Washington; 40.1705°N 80.2426°W	City	Education, George Washington
Washington and Jefferson College		February 2, 1954	South College Street (US 19) south of East Beau Street (PA 136), Washington; 40.170717°N 80.242717°W	City	Education, George Washington
Washington County		December 17, 1981	County courthouse, Main Street & Cherry Way, Washington; 40.17015°N 80.24538°W	City	George Washington, Government & Politics, Government & Politics 18th Century, Military, Roads, Whiskey Rebellion
Whiskey Point		May 26, 1949	Main Street (PA 136/88/837) between First Street & Park Avenue, Monongahela; 40.20015°N 79.92258°W	Roadside	Government & Politics, Government & Politics 18th Century, Military, Whiskey Rebellion
William Holmes McGuffey		April 23, 1998	National Road (US 40) at McGuffey High School/Middle School, just west of PA 221, east of Claysville; 40.139733°N 80.360133°W	Roadside	Education, Professions & Vocations, Publishing, Writers
Wolff's Fort		May 28, 1947	National Road (US 40), 3.3 miles southwest of Washington; 40.150558°N 80.323323°W	Roadside	American Revolution, Early Settlement, Forts, Military

== See also ==
- List of Pennsylvania state historical markers
- National Register of Historic Places listings in Washington County, Pennsylvania
- Washington County History & Landmarks Foundation
