= Globe Inn, Washington, Pennsylvania =

Globe Inn
- Location within Pennsylvania
- 40.16846°N 80.24477°W
- Location: Near present-day 155 South Main Street; Washington, Pennsylvania

History
- Built: 1798

Globe Inn was a famous inn and tavern in Washington, Pennsylvania. It was opened in 1798 by David Morris. With the completion of the nearby National Road westward to Wheeling, West Virginia, the Globe Inn was well-positioned to serve the new traffic. During that time, the Globe Inn hosted 5 Presidents of the United States: James Monroe, Andrew Jackson, William Henry Harrison, James K. Polk, and Zachary Taylor.

On May 25, 1825, the Marquis de Lafayette visited Washington, Pennsylvania and stayed at the Globe Inn on his tour of the United States to celebrate the 50th anniversary of independence. It was demolished in 1891.

On August 1, 1953, the Pennsylvania Historical & Museum Commission erected a historical marker on Main Street in Washington, noting the historic importance of the Globe Inn.

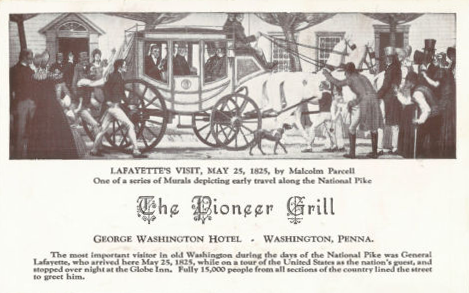
A postcard celebrating the 1825 visit of LaFayette, bearing a painting by Malcolm Parcell.
