= David Reed (pioneer) =

- Location within Pennsylvania
- 40.31493°N 80.26917°W
- Location: Pa. 50, 3 miles west of Pa. 980, near Venice, Pennsylvania

David Reed (1747 in Lancaster County, Pennsylvania – September 30, 1824 in Washington County, Pennsylvania) was an American pioneer in the early history of Pennsylvania.

== Biography ==
He was a squatter on land owned by George Washington in Washington County, Pennsylvania. At that time, Washington owned a large parcel of land, totaling 58,000 acres, across Western Pennsylvania, then part of the American frontier. The land had been given to Washington in the District of West Augusta by the Colony of Virginia in consideration of his service during the French and Indian War.

In 1777, David Reed, his brother John Reed, brother-in-law Samuel McBride (husband of David and John Reed's sister Lydia) and several other Seceder (or Associate) Presbyterians, moved from Lancaster County to what later became Washington County, Pennsylvania, to take possession of land that they believed themselves to have purchased from Colonel George Croghan, who himself had established an early British American trading post in the Ohio Country before the French and Indian War.

In 1784, following the end of his service in the Continental Army, Washington traveled to survey his land holdings. Reed and other Scotch-Irish pioneers/squatters had arrived in the 1770s and had settled the land, building fences, log cabins, and communities, which they felt gave them the right to the land. The group referred to themselves as Seceders, an 18th-century movement within Scottish Presbyterian which spread to the north of Ireland. Washington was intent on enforcing his legal rights to collect back rent. Attempts were made to arrive at a peaceful solution. On September 14, 1784, Washington met with the squatters at his gristmill near present-day Venice.

On September 20, 1784, a second meeting was held between Washington, Reed and a group of thirteen other squatters. The efforts were ultimately unsuccessful. The meeting was recorded in Washington's journal as follows:

September 20, 1784 dined at David Reed's, after which Mr. James Scott and Squire Reed began to enquire whether I would part with the land, and upon what terms; adding that, though they did not conceive they could be dispossessed, yet, to avoid contention, they would buy if my terms were moderate. I told them I had no inclination to sell; however, after hearing a great deal of their hardships, their religious principles which had brought them together as a society of Ceceders, and unwillingness to separate or remove, I told them I would make them a last offer and this was The whole tract at 25 shillings per acre. The money to be paid in three annual payments with interest or to become tenants upon leases of 999 years at the annual rental of 10 pounds per C per annum, etc.

In October 1786, a trial on the issue was held in Washington, Pennsylvania, with Pennsylvania Supreme Court Justice Thomas McKean riding circuit as the presiding judge. Though Washington won the suit, he absolved the settlers of back rent, asking only for future rent. Many of the Seceder squatters left the area in response. The Reed brothers acquired farms in Cecil township in Washington County. Samuel McBride settled on a farm in what later became Lawrence County, Pennsylvania.

In 1950, the Pennsylvania Historical and Museum Commission erected a historic marker at the site of his log cabin near Venice, Pennsylvania noting the historic importance of Reed and the squatters. The historical marker mistakenly identifies the Washington County squatters as Covenanters.

Reed's descendants include James A. Reed and David A. Reed. One of Samuel and Lydia (Reed) McBride's descendants, Grace Elizabeth (McBride) Crile (1876-1948), was the wife of George Washington Crile.
