= McGugin =

McGugin is a surname. Notable people with the surname include:

- Dan McGugin (1879–1936), American football player, coach, and lawyer
- Harold C. McGugin (1893–1946), American politician

== See also ==
- McGugin Gas Well
- McGugin Tunnel
