= Myrtles Plantation =

Historic house in Louisiana, United States

- U.S. National Register of Historic Places
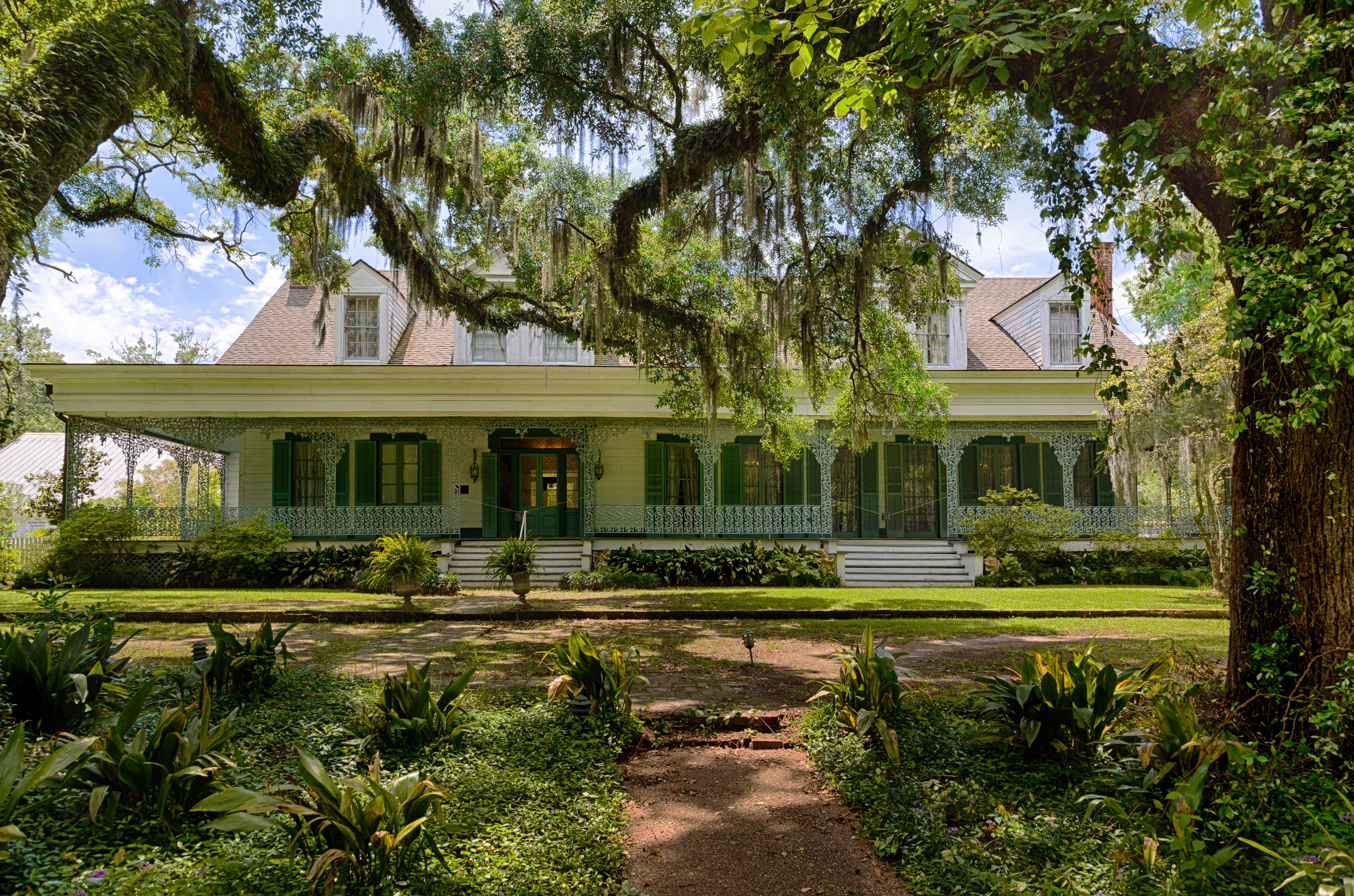

- Location within Louisiana Location within the United States
- Location: 7747 U.S. 61, St. Francisville, Louisiana
- Coordinates: 30°48′11″N 91°23′15″W
- Area: 10 acres (4.0 ha)
- Built: 1796
- Architectural style: Creole cottage
- NRHP reference No.: 78001439
- Added to NRHP: September 6, 1978

The Myrtles Plantation is a historic home and former antebellum plantation in St. Francisville, Louisiana, United States built in 1796 by General David Bradford. In the early history of the property, it was worked by enslaved people. It is reportedly a haunted place, and has been featured in television. The Myrtles Plantation has been listed on the National Register of Historic Places since 1978.

== House and grounds ==
=== Architecture ===
Sited on hill, the eastward-facing frame house, which features a clapboard exterior, is built in the Creole cottage style that characterized many Louisiana plantation houses in the 19th century. The original house was built in 1796 and featured six bays and three dormers on the roof. In the mid-1850s, the one-and-a-half-story house was extended south, almost doubling its size, and increased to nine bays including a new double door entrance. The entry doors are surrounded with a transom and sidelights, showcasing original hand-painted stained glass, etched and patterned after the French cross to allegedly ward off evil. The main feature of the Myrtles is the 125-foot-long veranda that extends the entire length of the façade, and wraps around the southern end of the house. The ornamental cast-iron railing, with an elaborate grape-cluster design, supports a broad Doric entablature, and on the gabled roof, with six brick chimneys, are two large double-paned, pedimented dormers with Doric style pilasters, interspersed with three single-paned dormers. When the original roof of the house was extended to encompass the new addition, the existing dormers were copied to maintain a smooth line. The west facing rear façade features a central, open loggia that is enclosed on three sides by the house, and on the roof are five pedimented dormers identical to the front.

=== Interior ===
The Myrtles has 22 rooms spread over two floors. The spacious entry hall runs the length of the house and features faux-bois, open pierced friezework molding, a French Baccarat crystal chandelier weighing more than 300 pounds and a cantilevered staircase. The flooring and most of the windows in the house are original. To the left of the hall is the music room that is adjacent to the only bedroom found on the first floor. The principal rooms of the house are found to the right of the hall. The walls of the original house were removed and repositioned to create four large rooms that were used as identical ladies and gentlemen's parlors, a formal dining room and a game room. The two parlors feature Carrara marble mantles in the Rococo Revival-style on the north and south walls, and are crowned with elaborate plaster cornices and ceiling medallions, made from a mixture of clay, Spanish moss and cattle hair, with no two being the same.

The second floor features five bedrooms with en-suite bathrooms. The largest bedroom, known as the Judge Clarke Woodruff Suite, is the only room that is accessed by the main staircase in the entry hall. The remaining four bedrooms, that are separated by a common sitting room, are accessed by a staircase that ascends from the rear loggia. The floor of these bedrooms were raised one foot when the house was renovated, as the addition had higher ceilings than the original house.

=== Grounds ===
The current plantation landscape is centered on a large pond that features a small island centered with a gazebo accessed by a bridge. To the rear of the main house is the oldest structure on the grounds. Now known as the General's Store, this was where Bradford lived while the main house was being built. Currently it is used as the gift shop, laundry facilities, plantation offices and guest breakfast spot. To the south is another structure that houses a restaurant. The two ancillary buildings are connected to the main house by a 5,000 square feet (460 m^{2}) old brick courtyard. Scattered elsewhere on the grounds are modern wooden cottages available to guests.

== History ==
=== 19th century ===
The Myrtles Plantation was built in 1796 by David Bradford on 600 acres (0.94 sq mi; 2.4 km^{2}) in what was then part of Spanish West Florida and was named "Laurel Grove." Bradford lived there alone for several years, until President John Adams pardoned him for his role in the Pennsylvania Whiskey Rebellion in 1799. He then moved his wife Elizabeth and their five children to the plantation from Pennsylvania. Upon Bradford's death in 1808, his widow Elizabeth continued running the plantation until 1817, when she handed the management to Clarke Woodruff, one of Bradford's former law students, who had married her daughter, Sara Mathilda. The Woodruffs had three children: Cornelia Gale, James, and Mary Octavia, before Sara Mathilda and two of her three children died in 1823 and 1824 of yellow fever.

When Elizabeth Bradford died in 1831, Clarke Woodruff and his surviving daughter Mary Octavia moved to Covington, Louisiana, and left a caretaker to manage the plantation. In 1834, Woodruff sold the plantation, the land, and its slaves to Ruffin Gray Stirling. Stirling and his wife, Mary Catherine Cobb, undertook an extensive remodeling of the house, nearly doubling the size of the former building, and filling the house with imported furniture from Europe. It was during this time that the name was changed to "The Myrtles" after the crape myrtles that grew in the vicinity. Stirling died in 1854 and left the plantation to his wife.

The Myrtles survived the American Civil War, though robbed of its fine furnishings and expensive accessories. In 1865, Mary Cobb Stirling hired William Drew Winter to help manage the plantation as her lawyer and agent. Winter was married to Stirling's daughter, Sarah, and they went on to have six children, one of whom (Kate Winter) died from typhoid at the age of three. The family fortune was lost in the aftermath of the war due to it being tied up in Confederate currency, and the Winters were forced to sell the plantation in 1868, but were able to buy it back two years later. In 1871, William Winter was killed on the porch of the house, possibly by a man named E.S. Webber. Sarah remained at the Myrtles with her mother and siblings until 1878, when she died. Mary Cobb Stirling died in 1880, and the plantation passed to her son Stephen. The plantation was heavily in debt, however, and Stephen sold it in 1886 to Oran D. Brooks, who in turn sold it in 1889. The plantation changed hands several times until 1891, when it was purchased by Harrison Milton Williams.

=== 20th century ===
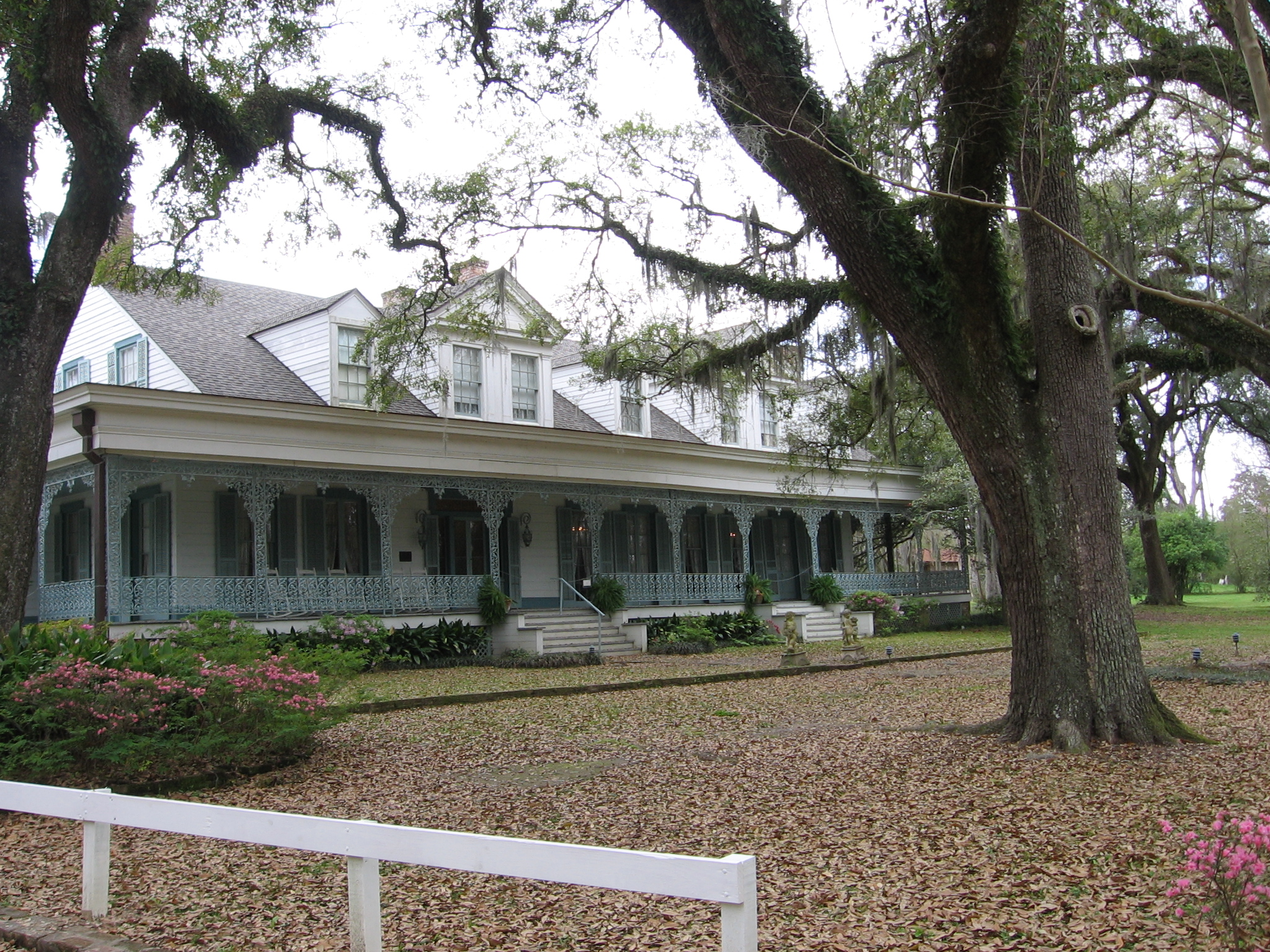

In the early part of the 20th-century, the land surrounding the house was divided among the heirs of Harrison Milton Williams. In the 1950s, the house itself was sold to Marjorie Munsons. The plantation went through several more ownership changes in the 1970s before being bought by James and Frances Kermeen Myers who ran the plantation house as a bed and breakfast. The current owners, John and Teeta Moss, continue to open the house for tours and overnight guests.

=== 21st century ===
In August 2014, a fire occurred in the historical General's Store, located just 10 feet from the main house, causing substantial damage. The most severe damage was in an extension of the building constructed in 2008 leaving most of the original structure intact and luckily not harming the house at all. Listed on the National Register of Historic Places, the Myrtles Plantation continues to be a popular tourist attraction due to its association with paranormal activity, and has been featured in many books, magazines, newspapers and television shows.

== Ghost tourism ==
The Myrtles has long been promoted as a ghost tourism site based around the plantation's many legends and ghost stories. One of the first accounts of the plantation's haunted presence was noted in 1948 in Clarence John Laughlin's book Ghosts Along the Mississippi. This place in the lore of Mississippi's haunted sites was cemented with the Louisiana Department of Commerce and Industry's 1960 publication Louisiana Plantation Homes which claimed that the Myrtles “is popularly reputed to have at least one ghost.’" The Myrtles early alignment with ghost tourism resulted in it being heavily marketed, resulting in it having "more entries in guidebooks of ghost hunting and haunted places than do other plantations." In the 1980s, the Myrtles Plantation was named America's Most Haunted House by the National Enquirer.

A few books have been dedicated to the history of the plantation site, but these histories scantily discuss the lives of enslaved African Americans who were forced to live and work on the site. The many ghost stories contain the few accounts of these residents. In 2013, a brochure distributed by the owners of the site proclaims across the top that the plantation is "One of America's Most Haunted Houses." Today, as was chronicled by Tiya Miles in 2015, the Myrtles offers evening Mystery Tours that explore the many ghost tales surrounding the plantation's history in addition to daily daytime historical tours. Miles explains that the two main ghost stories told on the tour, those of Chloe and Cleo, "are fundamentally stories of violence against black women—sexual violence, physical violence, and ideological violence," and are likened to the Jezebel and Mammy stereotypes of Black women.

=== Television ghost investigations ===
In 2002, Unsolved Mysteries filmed a segment about the alleged hauntings at the plantation. The Myrtles was also featured on a 2005 episode of Ghost Hunters. Other television shows which profiled the plantation include Ghost Adventures and Most Terrifying Places in America.

The plantation was featured on the second episode in the first season of the television series Files of the Unexplained, airing in April 2024.

== See also ==
- National Register of Historic Places listings in West Feliciana Parish, Louisiana
