= Anne Hupp =

Anne Rowe Hupp
- Born: 1757
- Died: June 26, 1823 (aged 65–66)
- Conflicts: American Revolutionary War

Anne Rowe Hupp (1757 – June 26, 1823) was an American frontierswoman of the Buffalo Creek Valley in Washington County, Pennsylvania. She led the defense of a small, isolated fort, Miller's Blockhouse, against a Shawnee attack, for more than twenty-four hours in 1782 while she was eight months pregnant.

== Personal ==
Anne was the daughter of Adam Rowe, who himself survived a Native American massacre in November, 1776, which killed his wife and one son and left another son missing. Anne had remained at home on Buffalo Creek. Anne had married John Hupp, a pioneer in the Buffalo Creek Valley, about 1775. The couple had four children: Mary (b.1775), Margaret (ca.1779), John, Jr. (b.1780), and Elizabeth (ca.1781).

Anne later married John May and they had 3 children: Benjamin, Ann, and George.

== Miller's Blockhouse ==
Another early settler, Jacob Miller, settled 400 acres (1.6 km^{2}) of land on Buffalo Creek watershed in the 1770s. Here he built "Miller’s Blockhouse", a fortified strong-point for protection against attack.

== Indian attack ==
In early April 1782, a party of Shawnee attacked the area, and the settlers gathered in forts and blockhouses for protection. Many of the men were absent from Miller's Blockhouse, defending a nearby strong point known as Rice's Fort. Among the remaining defenders were John and Anne Hupp with their children. The attackers hid nearby, perhaps hoping to surprise the men returning home. A colt belonging to Jacob Miller, Sr. strayed in the night and, despite pleadings from Anne that she had had a dream presaging disaster, John Hupp set out with Jacob to retrieve him. Once away from the fort the pair were attacked and killed by Indians lying in wait. The fort was left with only one elderly man, with several women and children. Anne took charge of the defense. She attempted to send eleven-year-old Frederick Miller as a messenger to Rice's Fort, but he was attacked and driven back inside. Anne encouraged the defenders and they were able to keep the attackers at bay. Somewhat later three men happened to return from Rice's Fort, Jacob Rowe, Jacob Miller, Jr., and Philip Hupp (Jacob, Anne's brother, was a survivor of the 1776 attack that killed his mother and brother). The arrival of the three discouraged the attackers, who lingered in the area until dark and then left. The settlers suffered only the two fatalities of John Hupp and Jacob Miller.

Attacks continued in the area from April to May 1782.
