= Robert Parkinson Farm =

Historic house in Pennsylvania, United States

- U.S. National Register of Historic Places
- Washington County History & Landmarks Foundation Landmark
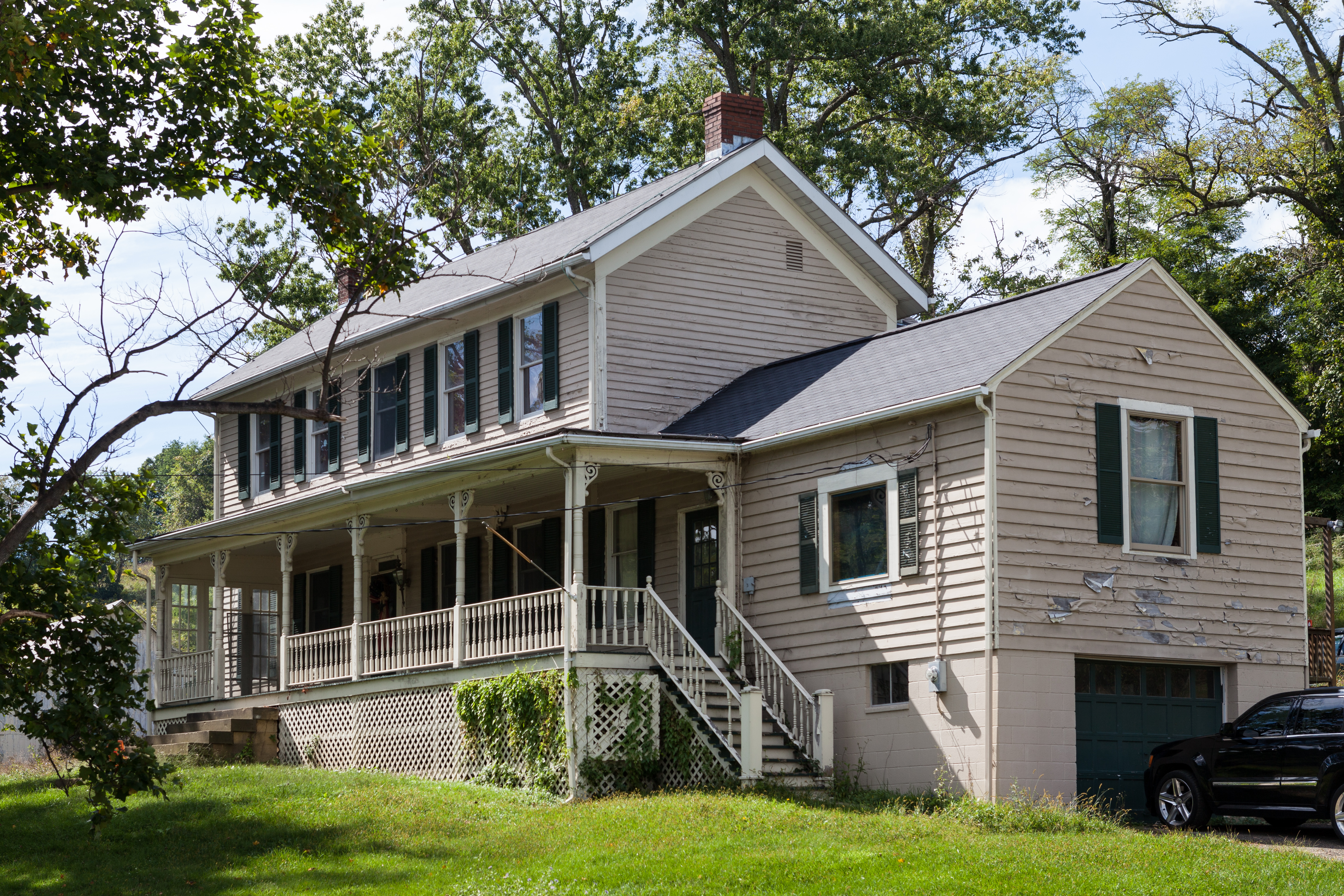
- The farm house in September 2014

- Location within Pennsylvania Location within the United States
- Location: PA 18, 0.4 mi. N of Old Concord Village, Morris Township, Pennsylvania, United States
- Coordinates: 40°0′44″N 80°20′0″W
- Area: 123 acres (50 ha)
- Architectural style: Greek Revival
- NRHP reference No.: 01000603
- Added to NRHP: July 15, 2002

Robert Parkinson Farm is a historic property located in Morris Township, Pennsylvania, United States.

Designated as an historic residential landmark/farmstead by the Washington County History & Landmarks Foundation, it is also listed on the National Register of Historic Places.

== History and architectural features ==
The contributing buildings are the house and banked barn (both c. 1830), a sheep barn (c. 1870), a hay shed and spring house (both c. 1880), and a privy (c. 1920). The house is a five-bay, center passage farmhouse with an attached rear kitchen; it was designed in a T-shaped floor plan. The Parkinson Farm is an example of an early nineteenth-century sheep farm, and it continued to operate as such until roughly 1960.

It is designated as a historic residential landmark/farmstead by the Washington County History & Landmarks Foundation, and is listed on the National Register of Historic Places.
