= Octavia B. Wynbush =

African American author and educator

Octavia Beatrice Wynbush (1898–1972) was an African American author and educator who gained recognition during the American Civil Rights Era. Wynbush lived some of her most active years in Kansas City, Missouri, where she taught both English and German classes at Lincoln High School. Wynbush most notably published her short story, The Wishing Wheel, in 1941. Her writings were regularly published in the NAACP literary magazine, The Crisis. She is remembered as a contributor to the American cultural revolution of the Harlem Renaissance.

== Biography ==
Octavia B. Wynbush was born to Abraham and Mary Sheppard Wynbush in 1898 in Washington, Pennsylvania. Not much is known about her early life, but while in high school her best subjects were English, history, and German. Her first college degree was obtained in 1920, which was a B.A. in German from Oberlin College. She was a sorority member of Alpha Kappa Alpha during her college education. After graduating from Oberlin, Wynbush started her teaching career at Straight College. Wynbush migrated from teaching jobs between several different schools in the southern United States before she was awarded a Rockefeller Foundation Fellowship in 1931. This award allowed her to then obtain a master's degree in English from the Teaching College at Columbia University in 1934. The majority of her pieces published in The Crisis were written while she was studying at Columbia.

Afterwards, Wynbush went to teach at Sumner High School in Kansas City, Kansas. While working at Sumner, she wrote a play titled "If A Man Dies", which was presented on KFKU, a radio station sponsored by the University of Kansas. In 1936, Wynbush began teaching at Lincoln High School in Kansas City, Missouri. While she taught English and German classes at Lincoln, she collaborated with a fellow African American teacher from Sumner High, Ms. George Green. Together they wrote and illustrated Wynbush's most well-known piece of writing, The Wishing Wheel, a children's story about a little boy with an overactive imagination.

Outside of her most well-known writings, she often had work published in both The Crisis, The Pittsburg Courier, and Opportunity Magazine. Her short story, "The Noose", was featured in Edward J. O'Brien's literary collection, The Best Short Stories of America in 1931.

During the summer of 1940, Octavia B. Wynbush toured four different states in the US and interviewed dozens of former slaves collecting valuable, historical photographs and deeply personal stories. Wynbush was known to enjoy taking domestic road trips when she wasn't writing stories or teaching students.

In 1963, Wynbush married Lewis Strong at age 65, this would be her first and only marriage. A year later she retired from her teaching career.

Wynbush died in 1972, though the cause and date of her death is unknown.
