= F. Julius LeMoyne House =

Historic house in Pennsylvania, United States

- U.S. National Register of Historic Places
- U.S. National Historic Landmark
- Pennsylvania state historical marker
- Washington County History & Landmarks Foundation Landmark
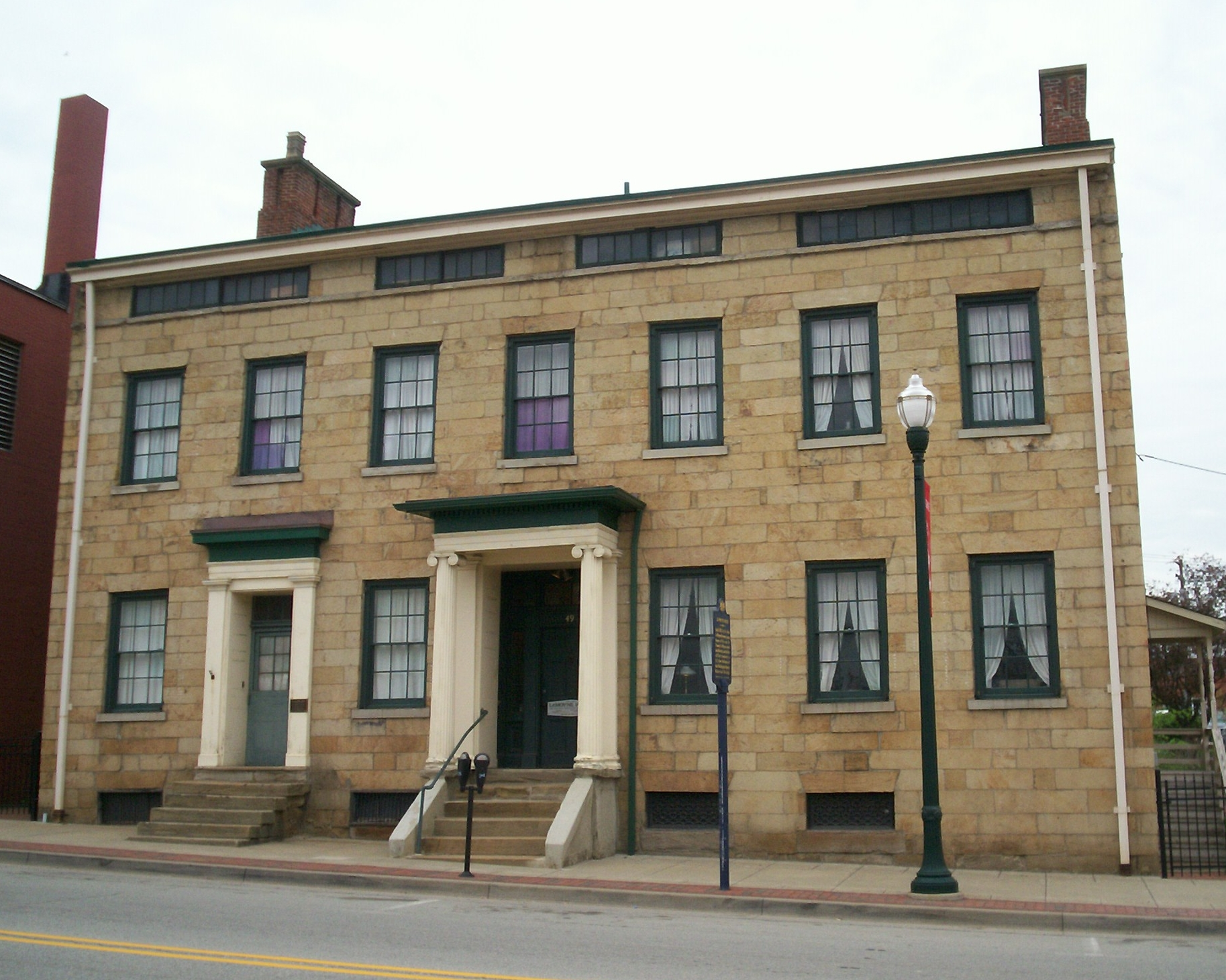
- LeMoyne House in Washington, Pennsylvania

- Location within Pennsylvania Location within the United States
- Location: 49 E. Maiden St., Washington, Pennsylvania
- Coordinates: 40°10′8″N 80°14′36″W
- Architectural style: Georgian, Greek Revival
- NRHP reference No.: 97001271

Significant dates
- Added to NRHP: September 25, 1997
- Designated NHL: September 25, 1997
- Designated PHMC: August 01, 1953

The F. Julius LeMoyne House is a historic house museum at 49 East Maiden Street in Washington, Pennsylvania. Built in 1812, it was the home of Dr. Francis Julius LeMoyne (1798–1897), an antislavery activist who used it as a stop on the Underground Railroad. LeMoyne also assisted in the education of freed slaves after the American Civil War, founding the historically black LeMoyne–Owen College in Memphis, Tennessee. His house, now operated as a museum by the local historical society, was designated a National Historic Landmark in 1997. It is designated as a historic public landmark by the Washington County History & Landmarks Foundation.

== Description and history ==
The LeMoyne House is located near the center of Washington, on the north side of East Maiden Street (United States Route 40) east of Shaefer Avenue. It is a three-story stone house built in the Greek Revival style. The front features two doorways, to allow for private and professional uses, and two entrance porticoes, one with columns and the other with pilasters. Long, narrow attic windows were added at a later date.

The house was built in 1812 by Dr. John LeMoyne, a French immigrant. His son, Dr. Francis Julius LeMoyne, lived here for most of his life, and also practiced medicine. In 1834, LeMoyne became active in the abolitionist movement, speaking and organizing on behalf of political solutions to the problem of slavery. Although he was not a radical firebrand in the mold of William Lloyd Garrison, LeMoyne was a regional director of antislavery societies until about 1850. He is well documented to have sheltered fugitive slaves here (and assisted them in other ways) in the years prior to the passage of the Fugitive Slave Act in 1850, activities that likely continued but are much less well documented afterward. LeMoyne's socially progressive politics included support for establishment of the local library, the endowment of two professorships at Washington & Jefferson College, and the establishment of LeMoyne College (now LeMoyne–Owen College) in Memphis, Tennessee.

LeMoyne's house was given to the Washington Historical Society in the 1930s by his daughter. It undertook to restore the building to a state similar to that during LeMoyne's lifetime, and now operates it as a historic house museum, offering guided tours year round. The house contains period artifacts and is dedicated to the memory of Dr. LeMoyne. In 1953, the Pennsylvania Historical and Museum Commission installed a historical marker noting the historic importance of the house. It was declared a National Historic Landmark in 1997.

== See also ==
- List of Underground Railroad sites
