= Day Covered Bridge =

Bridge in Pennsylvania, US

- U.S. National Register of Historic Places
- Washington County History & Landmarks Foundation Landmark
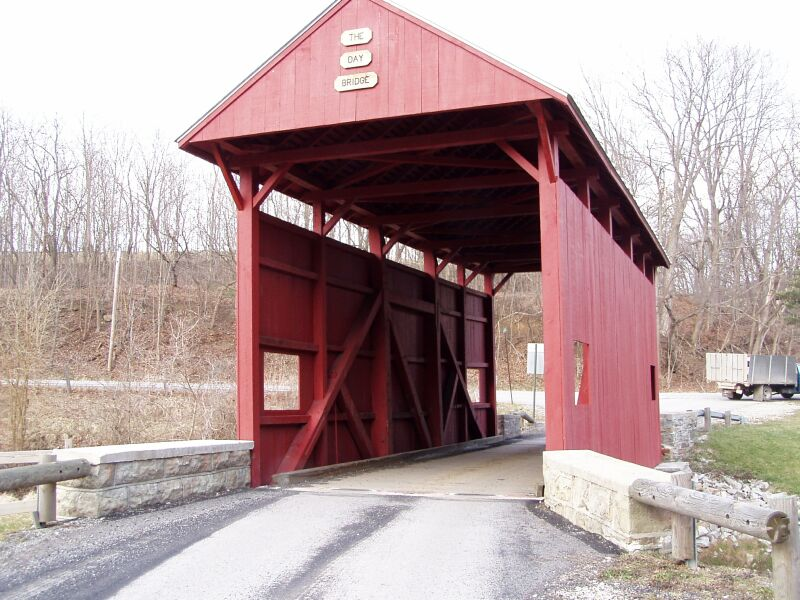
- Southern portal and eastern side of the bridge

- Location within Pennsylvania Location within the United States
- Nearest city: Prosperity, Pennsylvania
- Coordinates: 40°1′46″N 80°17′35″W
- Area: 0.1 acres (0.040 ha)
- Built: 1875
- Architectural style: Queenpost truss
- MPS: Covered Bridges of Washington and Greene Counties TR
- NRHP reference No.: 79002356
- Added to NRHP: June 22, 1979

The Day Covered Bridge is a historic Queen post truss covered bridge in Morris Township, Washington County, Pennsylvania. It is 12 feet (3.7 m) by 36.5 feet (11.1 m) and rests on three stone-and-mortar abutments. It was renovated in 2003, in a project that added steel support beams, a new roof, flooring, and sidewalls.

The Day Bridge is covered with vertical plank sidings on both sides and portals, and has a sheet metal gable roof.

It is designated as a historic bridge by the Washington County History & Landmarks Foundation.
