= Helen Turner (artist) =

American painter (1858–1958)

- Born: November 13, 1858; Louisville, Kentucky
- Died: January 31, 1958 (aged 99); New Orleans, Louisiana
- Known for: Painting

Helen Maria Turner (November 13, 1858 – January 31, 1958) was an American painter and teacher known for her work in oils, watercolors and pastels in which she created miniatures, landscapes, still lifes and portraits, often in an Impressionist style.

== Life and career ==
Turner was born in Louisville, Kentucky while her parents, Mortimer Turner and Helen Maria Davidson, were on a long visit to family in the town. She was the great-granddaughter of John Pintard of New York, granddaughter of a well-known doctor from New Orleans, and daughter of a wealthy Louisiana businessman. Turner spent much of her early life between Alexandria, Louisiana and New Orleans, and early became a refugee from the American Civil War, which destroyed her father's fortune and led to the loss of his business. Her mother died in 1865 after a long illness; her father's death when she was thirteen left her in the care of a widowed uncle in New Orleans who lived in "genteel poverty".

Turner began painting at twenty-two; her early works were portraits and bayou landscapes. Initially self-taught, she began taking free classes offered by Tulane University, continuing under the tutelage of Andres Molinary and Bror Anders Wikström; she also studied at the Artists' Association of New Orleans. The death of her uncle in 1890 meant that she had to support herself, and she took a position teaching art at St. Mary's Institute, a girls' school in Dallas, Texas, beginning in 1893. She moved to New York City in 1895, for further study and attended the Art Students League (where she was accepted despite being, at thirty-seven, beyond the age limit for admittance), Cooper Union and Columbia University; her teachers included Arthur Wesley Dow, Kenyon Cox, William Merritt Chase and Douglas Volk. Her sister Laurette ("Lettie"), a textile artist, came to New York with her. Turner traveled with Chase and his class to Italy in 1904, 1905, and 1911, but otherwise appears to have shown scant interest in studying abroad, unlike other American Impressionists.

Turner taught at the YWCA for seventeen years, starting with a newly created class on costume design. Beginning in 1906 she summered at the artists' colony in Cragsmoor, New York, to which she was introduced by Charles Courtney Curran; she continued there with few interruptions until 1941. In her early years there she rented space, but in 1910 she built a home and studio called Takusan. Her sister Lettie died in 1920; in 1926 she returned to New Orleans and resettled there, traveling north only for her summer sojourns. In New Orleans she continued to teach at the New Orleans Arts and Crafts Club, where her subject was draped-model drawing. She was elected an associate of the National Academy of Design in 1913, receiving 61 out of 64 votes, and was elected a full member in 1921, only the third woman to achieve the distinction and one of the first Academicians from the Southern United States. Furthermore, in 1916 William T. Evans nominated her an Artist Life Member of the National Arts Club; there, too, she was one of the first women accorded the honor. She continued to paint into the 1930s, but her eyesight gradually deteriorated; eventually she developed cataracts, and she was unable to paint at all after 1949.

Turner lived to be nearly a hundred. At her death she was buried at Metairie Cemetery; the funeral was held at Trinity Episcopal Church.

== Work ==
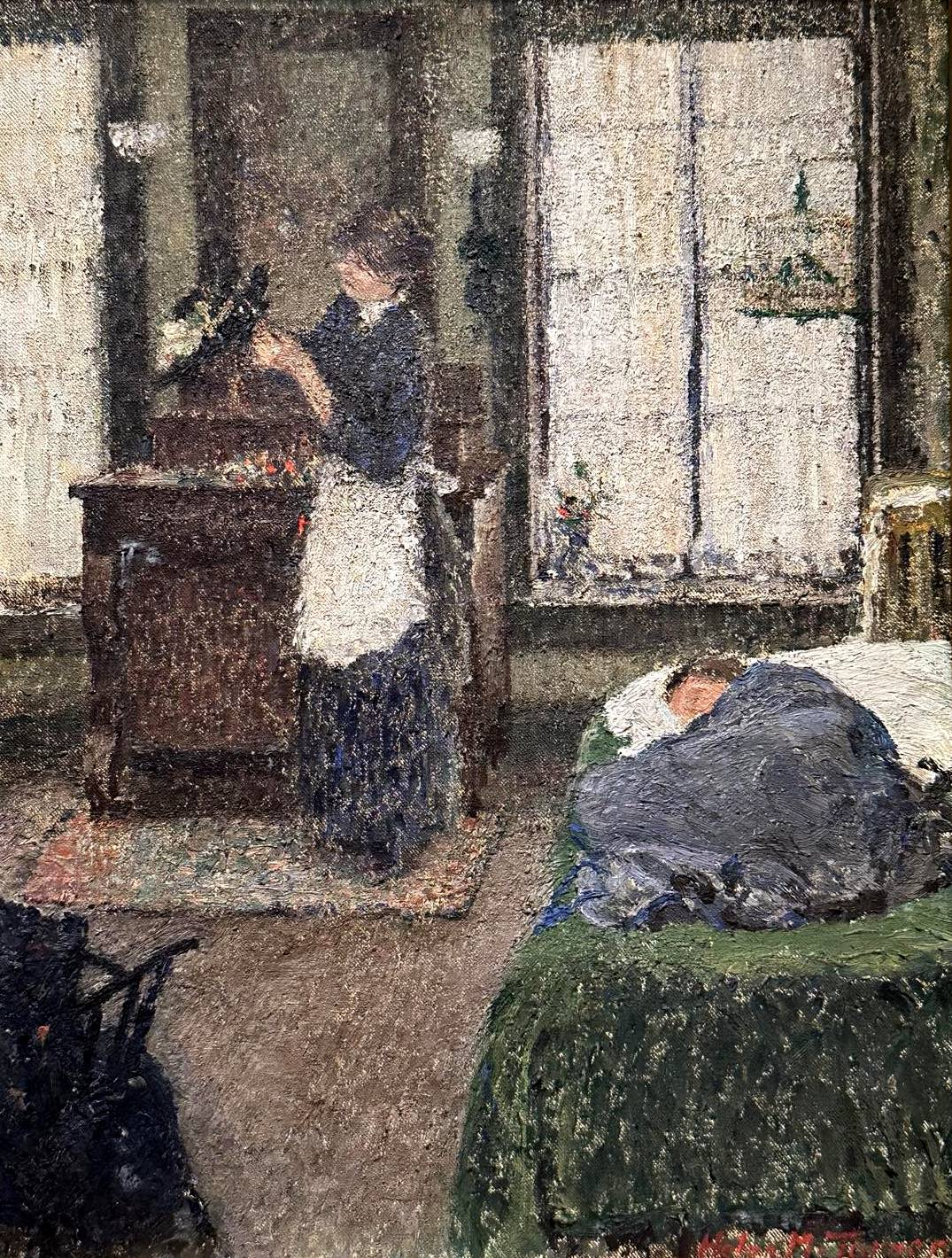
A Rainy Day (1918), The Phillips Collection

With its "broken" technique, blonde palette, and concern with the effect of light on her subjects, Turner's style has been described as Impressionistic. Unusually, it seems to have been developed almost exclusively in the United States, with few outside influences noted. None of her early work, from her first years in New Orleans, is known to survive; it is believed to have likely been academic in nature given what is known of her first instructors. Of her later teachers, she gave credit only to Volk and to Cox for the development of her style. Her work has been described as "unpretentious" and revealing, "unconsciously, a woman's point of view." Her subjects were frequently women, often depicted in musical pursuits. She experimented with tapestry work as well; a small number of piece worked with her sister Lettie are still known to exist.

A handful of Turner's paintings were executed in her quarters in Manhattan, but the bulk of them were created during her summer sojourns at Cragsmoor. The colony influenced much of Turner's work; while there she developed a love of gardening which translated itself into the floral backgrounds seen in many of her paintings.

Turner received many awards throughout her career, including the Cooper Union (New York City) bronze medal; the Elling prize for landscape from the New York Woman's Art Club; the National Arts prize from the Association of Painters and Sculptors; the Julia A. Shaw Memorial Prize from the National Academy of Design; and the John G. Agar prize from the National Association of Women Painters and Sculptors. She exhibited widely as well, showing at the New York Water Color Club, the Pennsylvania Academy of Fine Arts in Philadelphia, the American Society of Miniature Painters at the National Academy of Design in New York City, and the Corcoran Gallery in Washington, D.C, and being included in the exhibit Six American Women organized by the City Museum of St. Louis. Her paintings were purchased by major collectors such as Duncan Phillips.

Her works can be found in many collections including:

- National Academy of Design
- New York Historical Society
- Philadelphia Museum of Art
- Detroit Institute of Arts
- Phillips Collection, Washington, DC
- Memphis Brooks Museum of Art
- Chrysler Museum of Art, Norfolk, Virginia
- Tweed Museum of Art, Duluth, Minnesota
- Montgomery Museum of Fine Arts, Montgomery, Alabama
- Akron Art Museum, Akron, Ohio
- Rockford Art Museum, Rockford, Illinois
- Morris Museum of Art, Augusta, Georgia
- Ellenville Public Library, Ellenville, New York
- Cragsmoor Public Library, Cragsmoor, New York
- Greenville County Museum of Art, Greenville, South Carolina
- Metropolitan Museum of Art, New York City
- Jersey City Museum, Jersey City, New Jersey
- Speed Art Museum, Louisville, Kentucky
- Zigler Museum
- Sweet Briar College, Sweet Briar, Virginia
- numerous galleries and private collections

An undated portrait of Turner by Maria Judson Strean is in the collection of the National Academy of Design.
