= Maria Judson Strean =

American painter

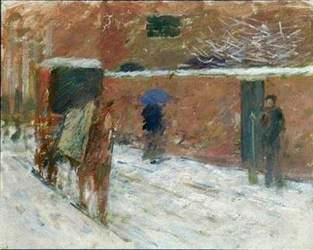
A Rainy Day in Philadelphia

Maria Judson Strean (1865 in Washington, Pennsylvania – 1949 in Pittsburgh) was an American portraitist, recognized primarily for her artistic work as a miniaturist.

== Biography ==
Strean studied at the Art Students League of New York with Kenyon Cox and J. Alden Weir. She also studied in Paris, where her teachers included René-Xavier Prinet and André Dauchez. She served as recording secretary of the Art War Relief and secretary of the Artists of Carnegie Hall, in which building she had an apartment and studio space for many years; she was also a member of the American Society of Miniature Painters, the Philadelphia Society of Miniature Painters, and the National Association of Women Painters and Sculptors.

She won a number of awards, including a medal at the Pan-American Exposition of 1901. Noted as well for her watercolors, she died in the East Liberty neighborhood of Pittsburgh, Pennsylvania, and was interred in the Washington Cemetery.

A miniature by Strean, titled Coral, is owned by the Metropolitan Museum of Art, and a portrait by her of Helen Turner is in the collection of the National Academy of Design. She is also represented in the collections of the Brooklyn Museum, the Pennsylvania Academy of the Fine Arts, and the Smithsonian American Art Museum.
