= Zigler Art Museum =

Museum in Jennings, Louisiana

The Zigler Art Museum
- Established: 1970
- Location: 154 North Main St., Jennings, Louisiana 70546
- Website: www.ziglerartmuseum.org

The Zigler Art Museum (ZAM) is an art museum in Jennings, Louisiana. It is located inside the City Hall.

The ZAM permanent collection represents major movements in art from the Nineteenth Century to the present. Established in 1970 by Ruth Zigler with 20 works of art and nine dioramas, the ZAM collection has grown to include over 600 objects.

== Description ==
The ZAM's exhibitions, which rotate quarterly, include thematic selections from the Permanent Collection, travelling exhibitions, and those curated by ZAM staff.

ZAM's collection includes local, national, and international works of art, with an aim to chronicle the development of visual art in Louisiana. Focusing on work of the nineteenth through twenty-first centuries, the museum's fine and decorative arts embody Louisiana's history and culture, while placing this local art within the global scene. This context provides an appropriate backdrop for the museum's focus on emerging Louisiana artists.

Highlights from the collection include work by John James Audubon, Charles Sprague Pearce, Helen Turner, Angela Gregory, Clementine Hunter, Ellsworth Woodward, Alexander Calder, Helen Gerardia, Alexander Drysdale, and a large collection of work by William Tolliver.

== History ==
Ruth Zigler started ZAM' with a trust fund in 1963. An avid collector, she also donated her personal art collection and the Clara Street house that she and her late husband, Fred B. Zigler, had owned since 1908. In anticipation of an expanding art collection and to house nine large wildlife dioramas, Ruth added two wings onto the home in 1969. TheZAM's formally opened to the public in 1970.

The ZAM collection now includes works of art by local, national, and European artists. The collection consists of two- and three-dimensional works from the nineteenth through twenty-first centuries, ranging from folk to Impressionist paintings, from native crafts to bronze sculptures, and from carved wood to photography.

In December 2015, ZAM moved into the City Hall building. The new facility provided more space for the collection and a location that would allow more interaction with the other cultural entities of Jennings.

- Zigler Art Museum
