= David Bradford (lawyer) =

American lawyer

David Bradford (1762–1808) was a successful lawyer and deputy attorney-general for Washington County, Pennsylvania in the late 18th century. He was infamous for his association with the Whiskey Rebellion, and his fictionalized escape to the Spanish-owned territory of West Florida (modern-day Louisiana) with soldiers at his tail. Bradford was later pardoned by President John Adams for his actions. Today, his family's home in Washington, Pennsylvania is a national landmark and museum.

== Political life ==
Throughout the early 18th century, what is now Washington County was claimed by both Virginia and Pennsylvania. It wasn't until March 28, 1781, the drawing of the Mason–Dixon line officially gave this land to Pennsylvania. Washington County was erected out of Westmoreland County at that time, and Washington, the county seat, was laid out by David Hoge later that same year. The following year, 1782, David Bradford, who was born in Maryland about 1760, came to town. Court records indicate that in April 1782 he was the sixth attorney to be admitted to the Washington County Bar Association. A brilliant young lawyer, he quickly established a very successful practice, and by 1783 he had been appointed deputy attorney-general for Washington County.

David Bradford had important family connections in town. One of his sisters, Agnes, had married John McDowell, a prominent local attorney; another sister, Jane, had married Col. James Allison, a lawyer who had settled in the Chartiers Valley in 1774. Both McDowell and Allison were elders in the Rev. John McMillan's Chartiers Church, and they also were among the first trustees of both Canonsburg and Washington Academies. David Bradford joined his brothers-in-law as a trustee of Washington College (now Washington & Jefferson College) and was appointed a member of the building committee. He was instrumental in building McMillan Hall at Washington College, which is one of the oldest surviving educational buildings in the nation and is listed on the National Register of Historic Places.

Bradford also became active in political affairs, and by 1791 he was becoming more and more absorbed in the escalating protest over a whiskey tax which had been levied by the federal government that year, and the general treatment of Western Pennsylvanians by the East.

== The Whiskey Rebellion ==
By 1794, Bradford had become a prominent figure in the Whiskey Rebellion, an insurrection that was caused, in part, by the lack of federal courts (which necessitated trips to Philadelphia for trial), large numbers of absentee landlords, conflicts with American Indians, and, most importantly, the high excise tax on whiskey. President George Washington ordered 13,000 troops to the Washington, Pennsylvania area as the first test of the power of the new government. When the militias arrived in Parkison's Ferry (now Monongahela, Pennsylvania), they began arresting suspected rebels. Among those who had warrants out for their arrest was Bradford.

=== Bradford's legendary escape ===
According to Harriet Branton's book, David Bradford and His House, Bradford was at home on October 25, 1794, when he was warned of the approach of a cavalry unit with orders to capture him. Bradford leaped from a rear window of his house onto his waiting horse, galloping off into the night. With the soldiers in hot pursuit of him (there was a price of $500 on his head), Bradford made it to McKees Rocks, where he traded his "faithful grey horse" for a skiff and set out down the Ohio River. A touch-and-go gun battle with his pursuers went on all night but he managed to slip through by staying close to the opposite shore of the river.

The next night Bradford encountered the skipper of a keelboat who was also fleeing the region for his part in the rebellion. Just as they were about to depart for New Orleans the following morning, the boat was boarded by a party of soldiers. The crew of the keelboat helped to disarm the troops and throw them in the river, pelting them with lumps of coal from the cargo aboard the boat. As the soggy soldiers sloshed ashore the keelboat headed downriver to freedom.

Once Bradford reached Louisiana, he sent for the rest of his family.

=== The real escape ===
Contrary to popular legend, Bradford did not leap from a rear window to escape arrest. Rather, he left Washington at a leisurely pace and went to Pittsburgh. From there he took a coal barge down the Ohio River to what is now Portsmouth, Ohio and (possibly later) to Spanish West Florida (New Orleans). According to the former historical collections director at Washington and Jefferson College, Charles M. Ewing, Federal authorities were most likely not too anxious to catch Bradford, as they did not want a difficult situation on their hands. Bradford apparently didn't even want to leave but was persuaded to do so by some of the other leaders of the insurrection, who for their own reasons, wanted him out of the way.

David Bradford was discovered by some of the troops while he was on a coal barge not far from Pittsburgh, en route to Spanish lands. The ship's captain, a Captain Keene, and crew, apparently saw to it that Bradford was not bothered by the troops. Keene later was involved in the Aaron Burr conspiracy and lived for a while near Bradford in Louisiana.

In 1797, David completed a home, the now famed "Most Haunted House in America", The Myrtles Plantation in St. Francisville. His wife, Elizabeth, and children joined him shortly thereafter. He soon became a wealthy planter. After being pardoned by President John Adams in March 1799, he returned to Washington, Pennsylvania at least once, in 1801, to officially sell his house.

== President Adams' pardon ==
To all persons to whom these presents shall come, Greetings. Whereas David Bradford, late of the county of Washington in the State of Pennsylvania, attorney at law, has in his petition declared his contrition, and sincere repentance of all his errors and misdeeds in relation to the late insurrection in the western parts of the State aforesaid, committed or done against the United States of America, and has implored a pardon for the same, and whereas the sufferings of the said David Bradford an exile in a foreign land, and separated from his wife, his children and his former friends, during the space of more than four years, have already been great, and whereas the restoration of peace, order, and submission to the laws in the said Western parts of the said State render it necessary to make examples of those who may have been criminal, the principal and of heinous punishment being the reformation of offenders and the prevention of crimes in others, for these and other good cause, I—John Adams, President of the United States of America, have granted, and by these presents do grant unto the said David Bradford a full, free, absolute and entire pardon for all treasons, suspicions of treason, felony, misdemeanors and other crimes and offences by him committed or done against the United States, in relation to the Insurrection aforesaid hereby remitting and releasing all pains, and penalties by him incurred by reason of the promises.

In Testimony whereof. I have hereto set my hand and caused the Seal of the United States to be affixed this ninth day of March, in the year of our Lord one thou. and seven hundred and ninety-nine, and in the Twenty-third year of the Independence of the said "United States".

John Adams, By the President, Timothy Pickering, Secretary of State.

== Home ==
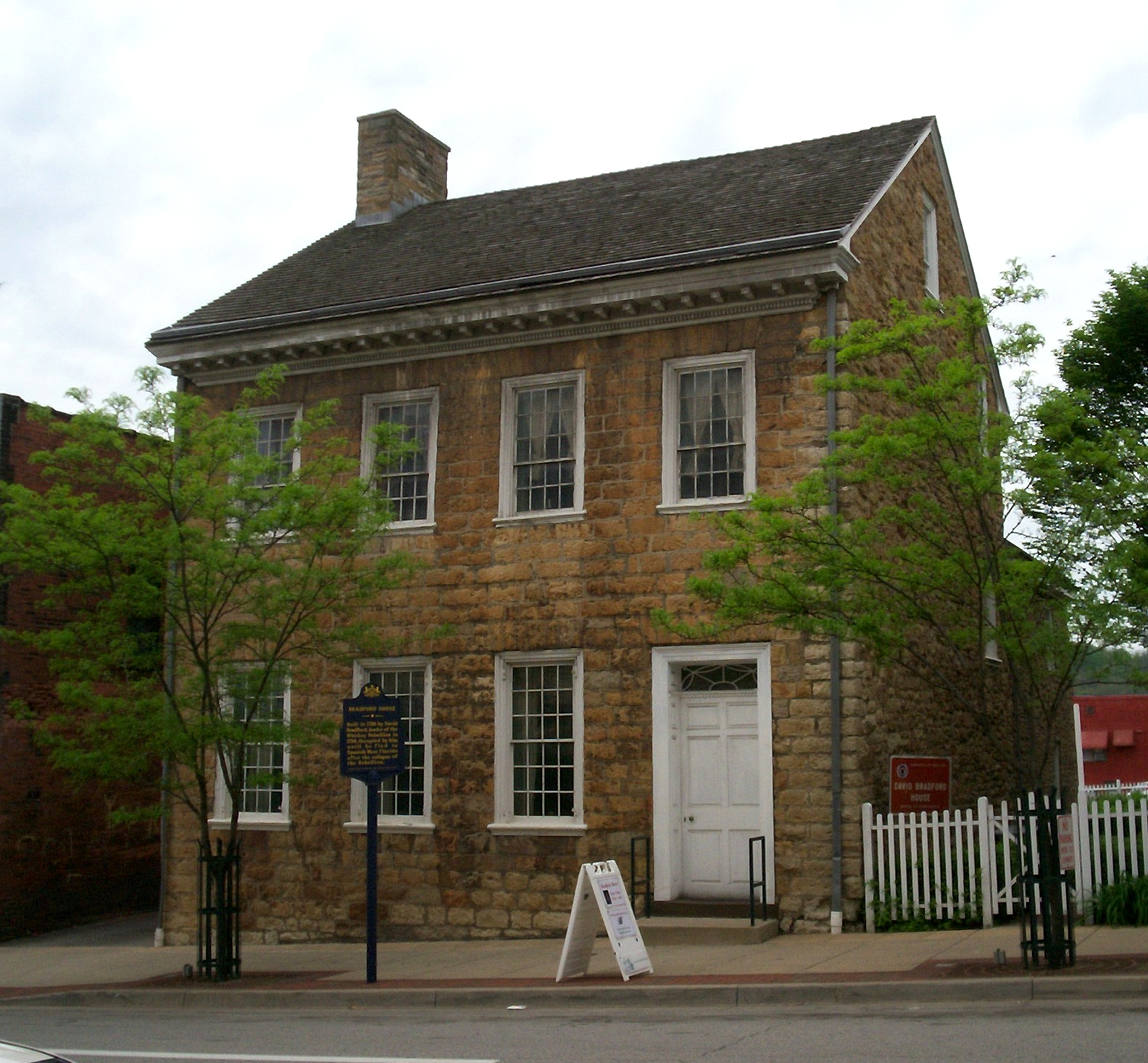
David Bradford House, from across South Main Street

Bradford built the first stone house on South Main Street in Washington, Pennsylvania in 1788, which, by frontier standards, ranked as a mansion. The handsome stairway was solid mahogany; the mantel-pieces and other interior furnishings, imported from Philadelphia, were transported across the Alleghenies at considerable expense. The David Bradford House was declared a National Historic Landmark in 1983.

The Myrtles Plantation was built in 1794 by General David Bradford and was called Laurel Grove at the time. Bradford lived there alone for several years, until being pardoned for his role in the Whiskey Rebellion in 1799. He then moved his wife Elizabeth and their five children to the plantation from Pennsylvania. Despite instances of Bradford being referred to as General David Bradford, he was not a veteran and never held such a title in any military service. This reference stems from his service as deputy attorney-general of Washington County, Pennsylvania.

== See also ==
- List of people pardoned or granted clemency by the president of the United States
