= Morris Township, Washington County, Pennsylvania =

Township in Pennsylvania, US

Morris Township
- Township
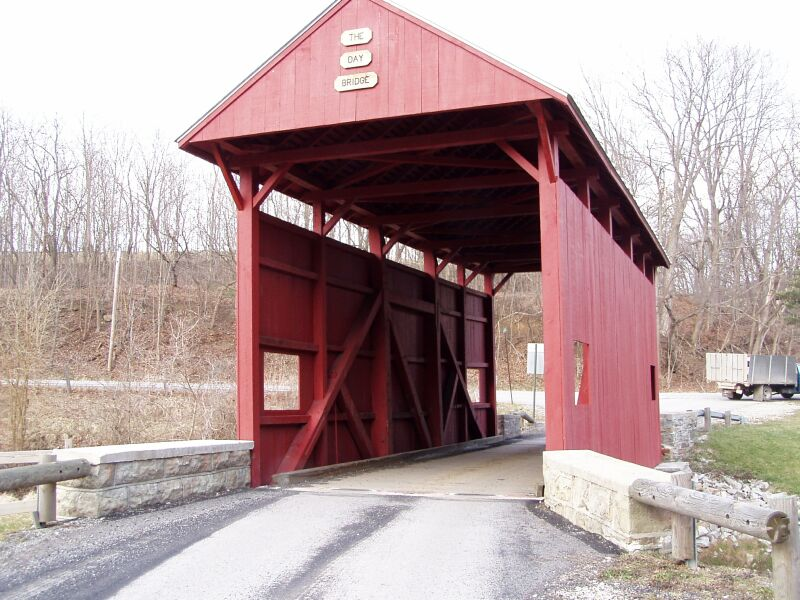
- Day Covered Bridge

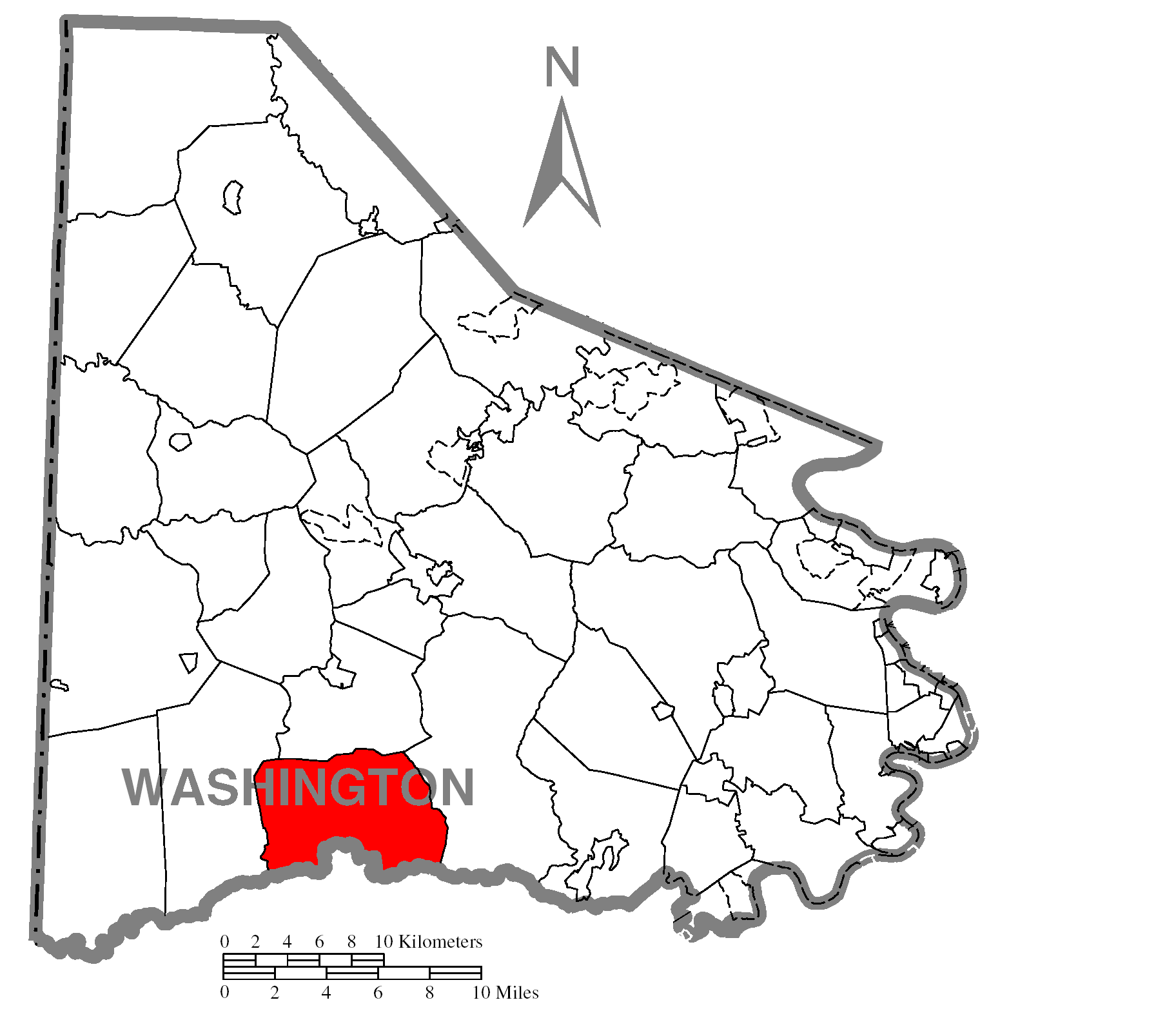
- Location of Morris Township in Washington County

- Location of Washington County in Pennsylvania
- Country: United States
- State: Pennsylvania
- County: Washington County

Area
  - Total: 28.43 sq mi (73.63 km^{2})
  - Land: 28.42 sq mi (73.60 km^{2})
  - Water: 0.012 sq mi (0.03 km^{2})

Population (2020)
  - Total: 906 ▼
  - Estimate (2021): 909
  - Density: 39.1/sq mi (15.08/km^{2})
- Time zone: UTC-4 (EST)
  - Summer (DST): UTC-5 (EDT)
- Area code: 724
- FIPS code: 42-125-51104
- Website: https://morristwpwashco.org/

Historical population
Census	Pop.	Note	%±
2000	1,272		—
2010	1,105		−13.1%
2020	906		−18.0%
2025 (est.)	902		−0.4%
U.S. Decennial Census

Morris Township is a township in Washington County, Pennsylvania, United States. The population was 906 at the 2020 census.

== History ==
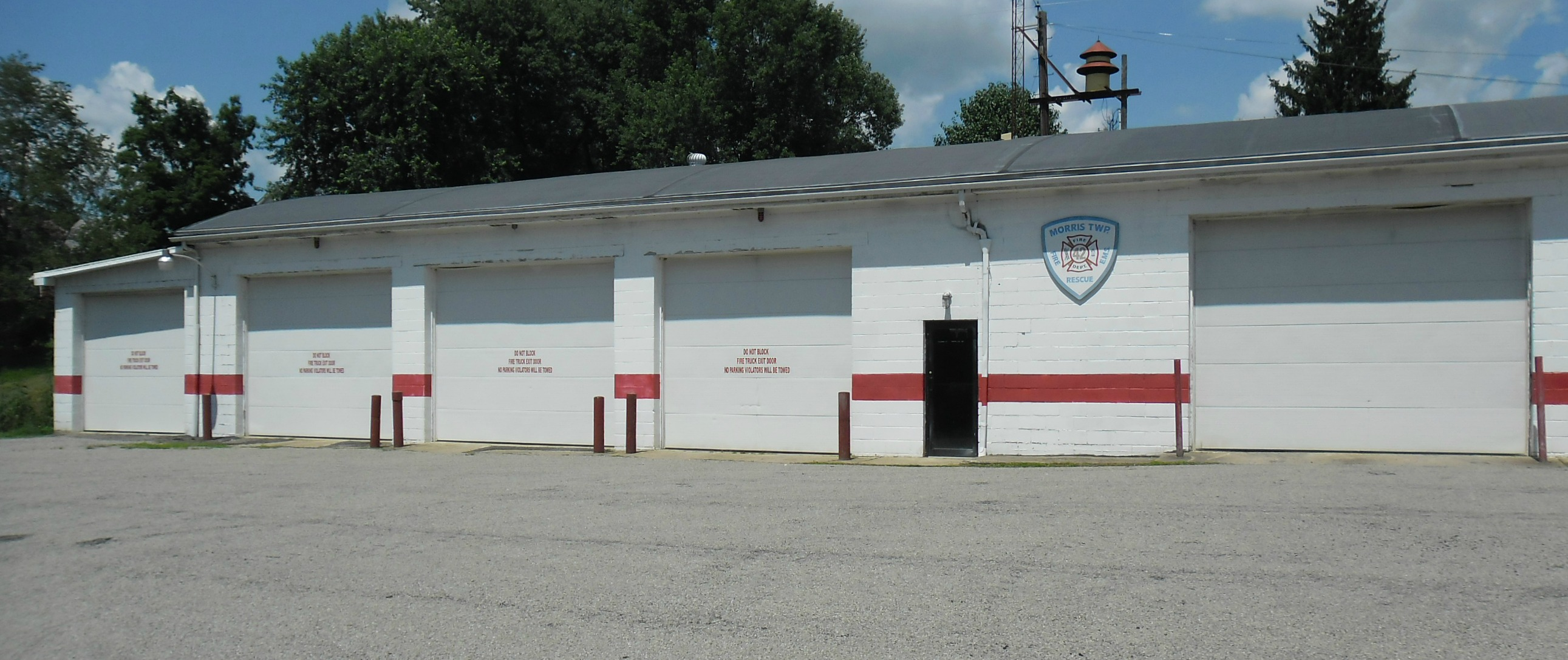
Fire protection and ambulance service is provided by the Morris Township Volunteer Fire Department

The Day Covered Bridge and Robert Parkinson Farm are listed on the National Register of Historic Places.

== Geography ==
According to the United States Census Bureau, the township has a total area of 28.4 square miles (74 km^{2}), of which, 28.4 square miles (73.5 km^{2}) of it is land and 0.04% is water.

== Demographics ==
As of the census of 2010, there were 1,105 people, 428 households, and 339 families living in the township. The population density was 44.8 people per square mile (17.3 people/km^{2}). There were 454 housing units at an average density of 16.0 per square mile (6.2/km^{2}). The racial makeup of the township was 97.0% White, 1.3% Black or African American, 0.1% Asian, 0.7% American Indian and 0.6% from two or more races. Hispanic or Latino of any race were 1.7% of the population.

There were 413 households, out of which 26.9% had children under the age of 18 living with them, 58.6% were married couples living together, 10.4% had a female householder with no husband present, 5.3% had a male householder with no wife present and 25.7% were non-families. 21.5% of all households were made up of individuals. The average household size was 2.6 and the average family size was 2.97.

The median age was 43.4 years. Males make up 53.7% of the population and females make up 46.3%.

The median income for a household in the township was $42,652, and the median income for a family was $43,826. Males had a median income of $34,688 versus $22,727 for females. The per capita income for the township was $16,509. About 6.5% of families and 8.1% of the population were below the poverty line, including 11.5% of those under age 18 and 1.8% of those age 65 or over.
