= Washington oil field =

Oil field in Washington County, Pennsylvania

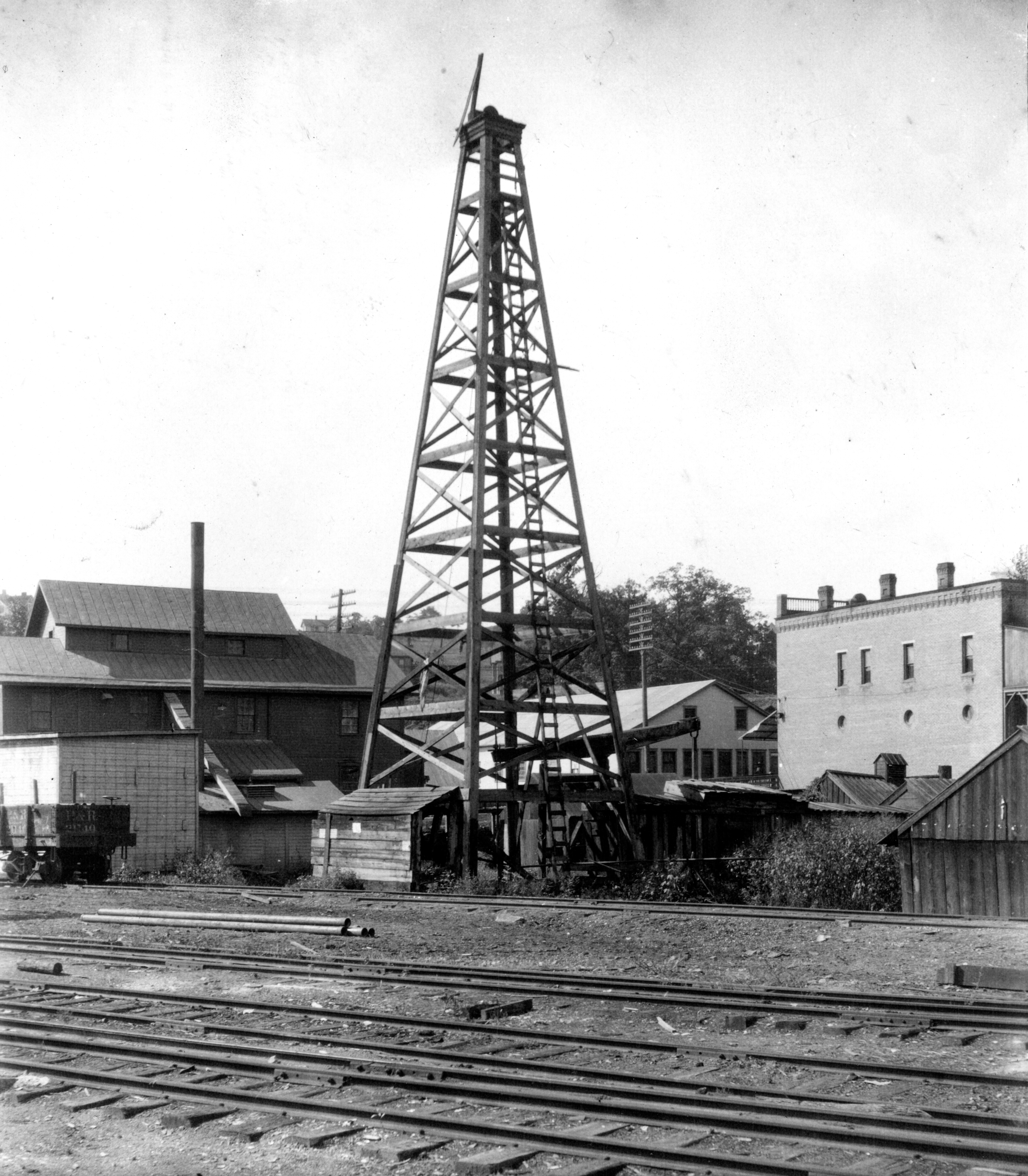
A United States Geological Survey photo of the Gantz oil well in 1904.

The Washington oil field is an oil field and in Washington County, Pennsylvania. It also produced natural gas.

The oil field fueled a boom in Washington County, Pennsylvania from the 1880s to the early 1900s. For a time, the McGugin Gas Well was the largest flow of natural gas in the world and provided Pittsburgh with most of its natural gas needs.

== Geological components ==
The Gantz Sand, named after Washington's Gantz Oil Well, is located in the upper Devonian/lower Mississippian strata. Its clean pebbly sandstone stretches from Washington County into north central West Virginia and produces oil and gas at depths greater than 1,700 feet (520 m). The Gantz sand is frequently misidentified.

== Early extraction efforts ==
The Washington oil field was first tapped by Washington County Eureka Oil Company in 1861. The well, which was drilled to a depth of 900 feet (270 m), was located at the Mannon farm, located at the West Amity station along the Waynesburg and Washington Railroad. Other short-lived exploratory efforts were subsequently undertaken at Prosperity, Lone Pine, and South Strabane Township.

== Natural gas extraction ==
McGugin Gas Well
- Location within Pennsylvania
- Location: Pa. 18 NW of Washington

In March, 1882, the Morgan Oil Company drilled a well at Alexander V. McGugin's farm in Mount Pleasant Township. The second well attempt, reaching a depth of 2,247 feet (685 m), hit a large pocket of natural gas. It was the largest flow of natural gas in the world. The rush of uncaptured gas could be heard for miles. Historian Earle Forrest described the event, saying that "one of nature's marvels had been uncorked".

A year of wasted gas flow passed before the flow was tapped into a 6 inches (150 mm) pipe to Pittsburgh. By 1885, 5 wells in the Canonsburg area had been drilled, growing to 17 by November 1, 1886. The success of this well initiated the beginning and development of the great oil and gas fields in southwestern Pennsylvania.

In 1967, the Pennsylvania Historical & Museum Commission erected a historical marker in honor of McGugin Gas Well well along Pennsylvania Route 18 northwest of Washington.

== Oil extraction ==
Gantz Oil Well
- Location within Pennsylvania
- 40.1712°N 80.2555°W
- Location: W. Chestnut St. at Brookside Ave., Washington

In 1884, Citizens Natural Gas Company drilled a well 2,191 feet (668 m) deep on the Gantz mill property, near the Chestnut Street station of the Pennsylvania Railroad. The well hit a sand formation, now known as the Gantz Sand, that produced oil, surprising the company. That sand formation is known as the Gantz Sand. This was the first oil well in Washington County and set off an oil boom in the area.

Within 3 months, 21 wells were drilled throughout the county. One well at a depth of 2,392 feet (729 m) by People's Light and Heat Company on the Gordon farm north of Washington was the deepest producing oil well in the world. Production levels exploded in 1886; May production levels were from 4,000 barrels per day, rising to 10,120 barrels per day in June, and peaking at 17,549 barrels per day in October. Contemporary reports indicate that over 100 derricks were visible from the LeMoyne well on Prospect Avenue. The boom was especially notable in Murdocksville, Burgettstown, Cross Creek, and Cherry Valley. This increase in oil production signaled a shift in the center of the Pennsylvania oil industry from Northwestern Pennsylvania (home to the Drake Well) to Southwestern Pennsylvania, particularly Washington County.

Washington & Jefferson College also owned oil wells; in 1885 the college purchased the old Washington Fairgrounds and transformed it into a college athletic facility (eventually Cameron Stadium) by erecting oil wells on the grounds.

McDonald Oil Field
- Location within Pennsylvania
- 40.3664°N 80.2411°W
- Location: Pa. 980 in McDonald Borough

In 1890 oil was first struck at the McDonald Oil Field, which quickly became the highest producing oil field in the world until 1892. McDonald grew significantly as a result of its oil production and was incorporated as a borough by 1889. The boom and subsequent development lasted around 20 years, dropping significantly around shortly after the turn of the century. The last oil was shipped around 1916.

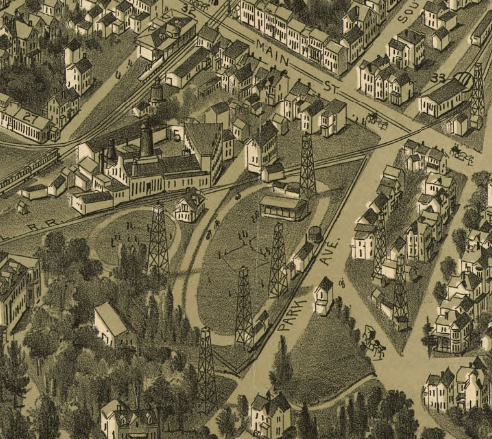
Map of Washington, showing the Old Fairgrounds in 1897. Note the oil wells.

In 1953, the Pennsylvania Historical & Museum Commission erected a historical marker in honor of the well along West Chestnut Street in Washington. (Note: The marker appears to be broken/missing as of a photo taken January 4, 2014. A photo taken September 23, 2007, shows the marker in place.) The West Virginia Division of Culture and History erected a historical marker noting the Gantz Sand in Aurora, West Virginia.

== Natural gas development in Marcellus Shale ==
In the mid 2000s, Washington County would become central to the rebirth of the resource extraction industry, with the development of the hydraulic fracturing in the Marcellus Shale.

== Gallery ==
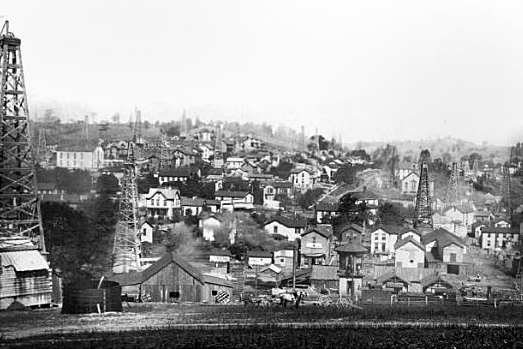
Oil derricks in Finleyville

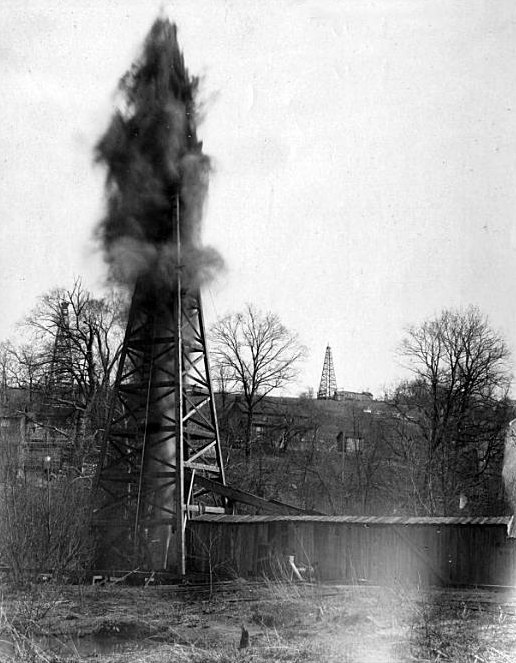
A gusher in Taylorstown
