= Washington, Pennsylvania =

City in Pennsylvania, US

- City
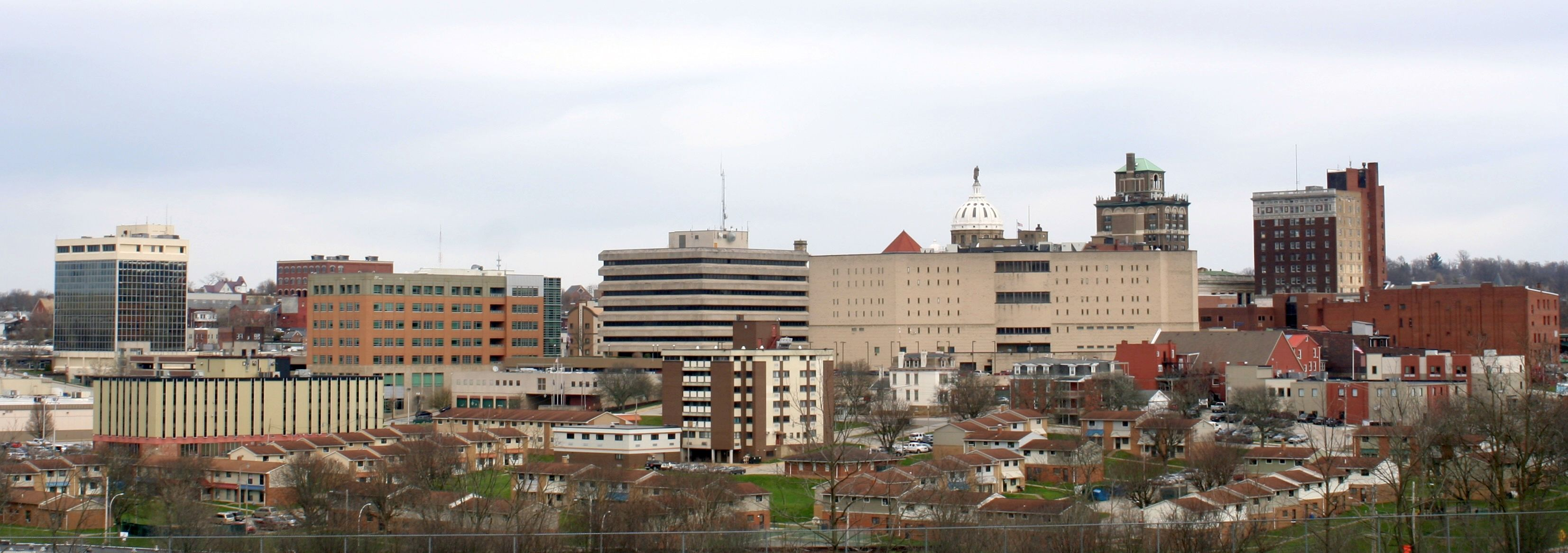
- Downtown Washington
- Nicknames: Little Washington, Washpa
- Interactive map of Washington, Pennsylvania
- Location within Pennsylvania Location within the United States
- Coordinates: 40°10′30″N 80°15′02″W
- Country: United States
- State: Pennsylvania
- County: Washington
- Established: 1768

Government
  - Mayor: JoJo Burgess (D)

Area
  - Total: 2.92 sq mi (7.56 km^{2})
  - Land: 2.92 sq mi (7.56 km^{2})
  - Water: 0 sq mi (0.00 km^{2})
- Elevation: 1,178 ft (359 m)

Population (2020)
  - Total: 13,176
  - Density: 4,516.5/sq mi (1,743.82/km^{2})
- Time zone: UTC-5 (Eastern (EST))
  - Summer (DST): UTC-4 (EDT)
- ZIP Code: 15301
- Area codes: 724, 878
- FIPS code: 42-81328
- Website: http://www.washingtonpa.us/

Washington is a city in Washington County, Pennsylvania, United States, and its county seat. The population was 13,176 at the 2020 census. It is part of the Pittsburgh metropolitan area in southwestern Pennsylvania. Nicknamed "Little Washington" to distinguish it from Washington, D.C., the city is home to Washington & Jefferson College and Pony League baseball.

== History ==
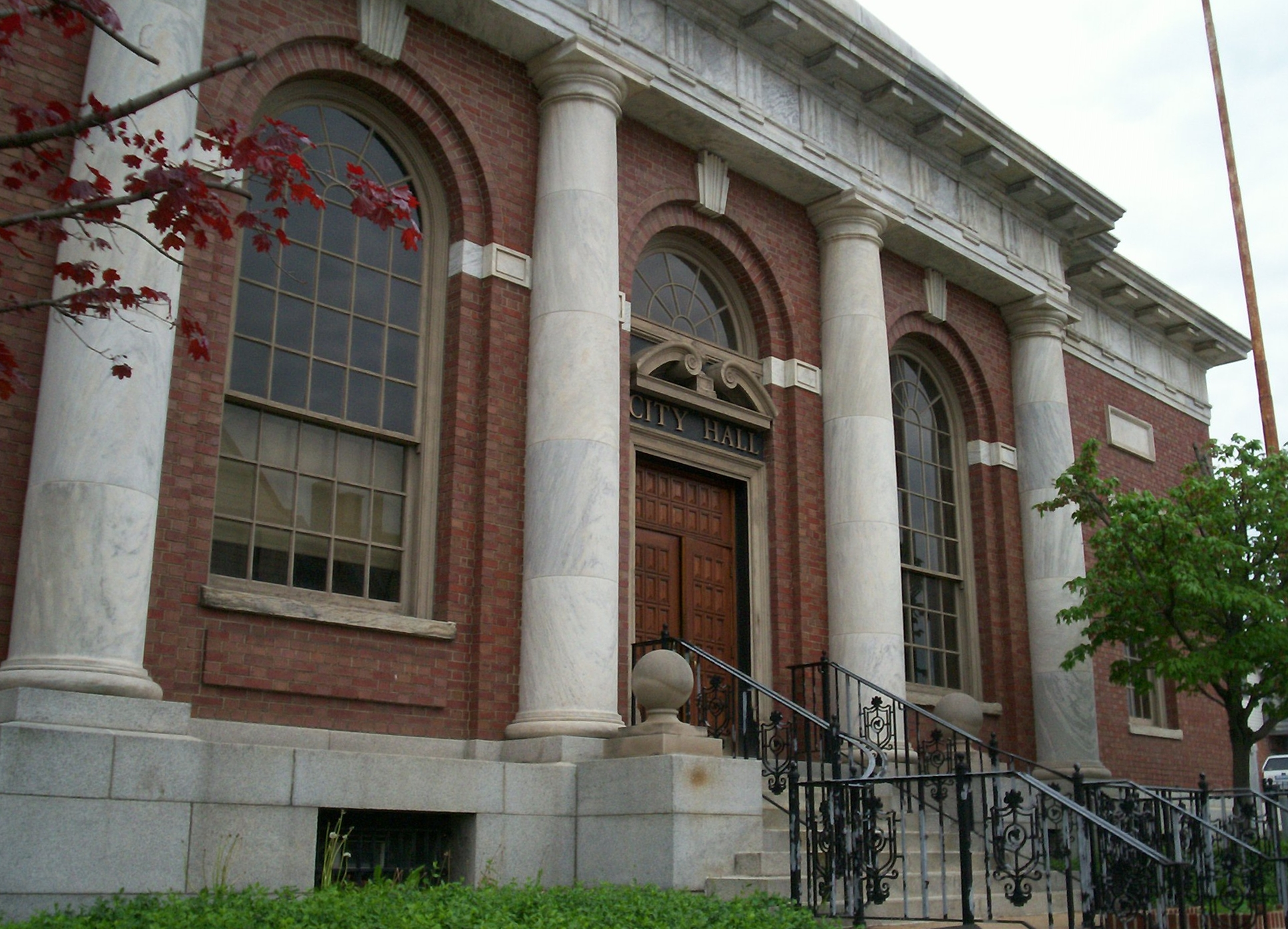
City Hall in Washington

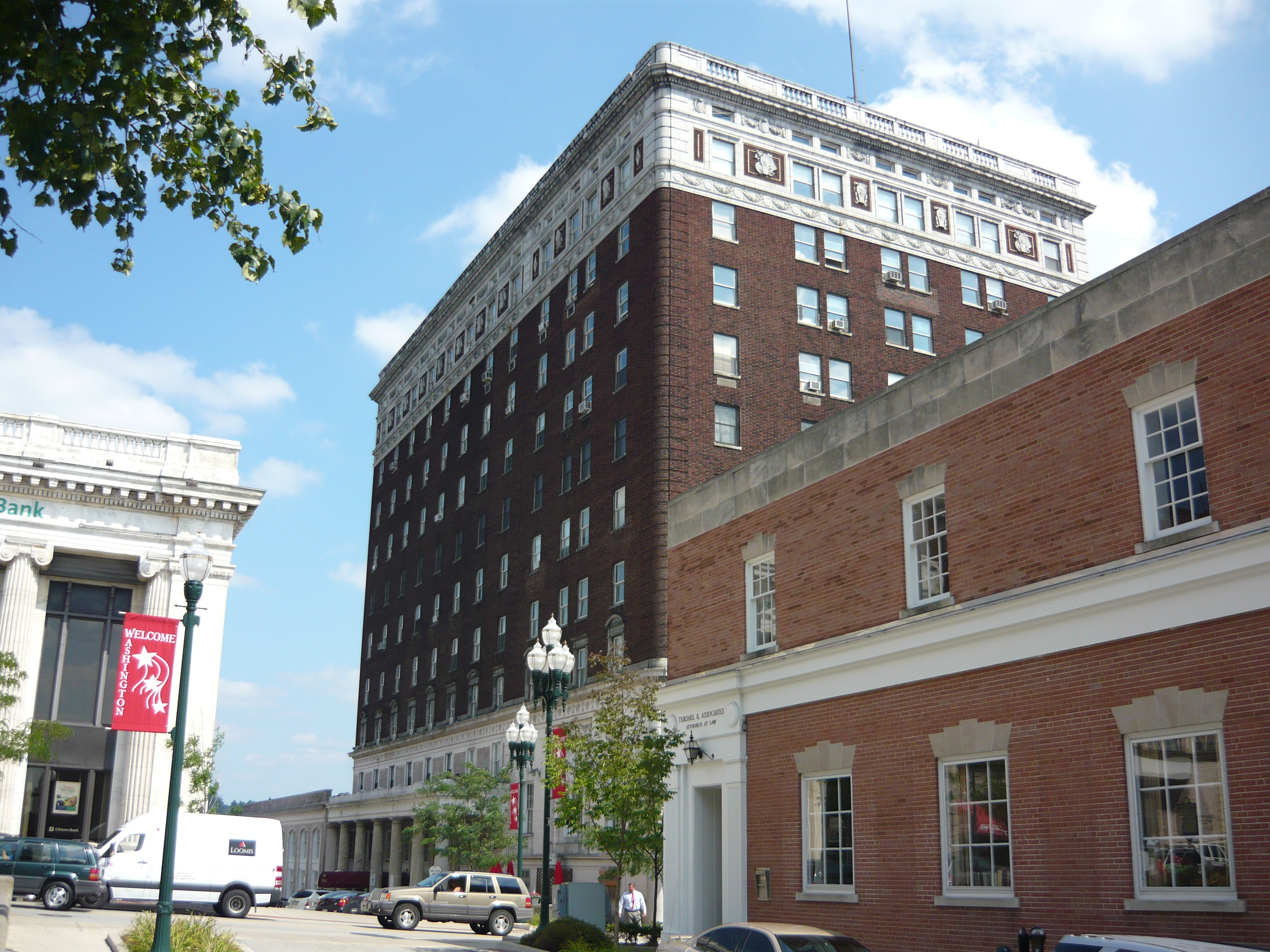
George Washington Hotel

The French labeled the area "Wissameking", meaning "catfish place", as early as 1757.

=== 18th century ===
The area of Washington was settled by many immigrants from Scotland and the north of Ireland along with settlers from eastern and central parts of the Colony of Virginia, first settled around 1768.

The Pennsylvania General Assembly passed an act on March 28, 1781, establishing the County of Washington and naming "Catfish Camp" as the place for holding the first election.

David Hoge laid out a plan of lots immediately after the legislature's action. His original plot carried the name "Bassett, alias Dandridge Town," but before the plot was recorded, lines were drawn through "Bassett, alias Dandridge Town" with ink, and the word "Washington" was written above. There have long been rumors among locals that the town was named Washington because George Washington spent the night in the region once. This is not true however; Washington had never been to the area.

The original plot dedicated a tract of ground to the people for recreational purposes. A lot was given for a courthouse where the current building now stands, and Lots 43 and 102, according to the plan, were presented by Hoge to "His Excellency, General Washington, and Mrs. Washington."

Washington, Pennsylvania, was the center for the Whiskey Rebellion of 1791, which was one of the first open rebellions against the new U.S. government and Constitution. The rebellion was centered on a tax being imposed on whiskey distillation in the region. The house of David Bradford, one of the leaders of the rebellion, is now a museum devoted to the Whiskey Rebellion, the David Bradford House, located on South Main Street of the city.

=== 19th century ===
The town was incorporated as a borough on February 13, 1810, and became a class three-sized city in 1924.

In August 1875, construction began of the 3 ft (914 mm) Waynesburg and Washington Railroad, conceived by John Day in 1874 and chartered in 1875. Passenger services ended in 1929, conversion to standard gauge followed in 1944, when it was renamed the Waynesburg Secondary. Freight services ended in 1976, although part of the line still survives for access to a coal mine.

The discovery of oil and natural gas at the Washington oil field caused a boom period from the 1880s to the early 1900s.

James B. Wilson chartered the Washington Electric Street Railways in 1889 with construction beginning in November 1890. The first line was built from the Waynesburg and Washington Narrow Gauge station to Wilson Orchard, just north of the present day site of the UPMC Washington hospital.

=== 20th century ===
In 1903, the Washington and Canonsburg Railway Company linked Washington to Canonsburg, Pennsylvania, with a trolley line. The company was bought by the Philadelphia Company in 1906, later becoming part of the Pittsburgh Railway Company, linking through to Pittsburgh as part of their interurban service in 1909. The line closed on August 29, 1953. A short section of the line and a number of trolley cars are preserved at the Pennsylvania Trolley Museum north of the city.

== Geography ==
According to the U.S. Census Bureau, Washington has a total area of 3.3 square miles (8.5 km^{2}), all land.

=== Climate ===
Washington has a humid continental climate (Köppen Dfa/Dfb), with warm to hot and humid summers and cold, snowy winters. Precipitation is highest in the summer months, with an annual average of 38.87 in (987 mm). Snow usually falls between November and April, with an average of 37.8 in (96 cm).

Climate data for Washington, Pennsylvania (1991–2020 normals, extremes 1975–present)
Month	Jan	Feb	Mar	Apr	May	Jun	Jul	Aug	Sep	Oct	Nov	Dec	Year
Record high °F (°C)	70 (21)	75 (24)	82 (28)	90 (32)	94 (34)	93 (34)	100 (38)	96 (36)	95 (35)	87 (31)	80 (27)	76 (24)	100 (38)
Mean daily maximum °F (°C)	35.1 (1.7)	38.5 (3.6)	48.5 (9.2)	60.7 (15.9)	69.4 (20.8)	78.0 (25.6)	81.6 (27.6)	80.7 (27.1)	73.9 (23.3)	62.3 (16.8)	51.0 (10.6)	39.1 (3.9)	59.6 (15.3)
Daily mean °F (°C)	26.0 (−3.3)	28.6 (−1.9)	37.2 (2.9)	48.6 (9.2)	57.5 (14.2)	66.2 (19.0)	70.0 (21.1)	69.0 (20.6)	61.9 (16.6)	50.6 (10.3)	41.1 (5.1)	30.5 (−0.8)	48.9 (9.4)
Mean daily minimum °F (°C)	16.8 (−8.4)	18.7 (−7.4)	26.0 (−3.3)	36.5 (2.5)	45.6 (7.6)	54.4 (12.4)	58.5 (14.7)	57.3 (14.1)	49.9 (9.9)	39.0 (3.9)	31.1 (−0.5)	21.8 (−5.7)	38.0 (3.3)
Record low °F (°C)	−25 (−32)	−20 (−29)	−1 (−18)	9 (−13)	20 (−7)	32 (0)	38 (3)	29 (−2)	30 (−1)	18 (−8)	−4 (−20)	−16 (−27)	−25 (−32)
Average precipitation inches (mm)	2.87 (73)	2.47 (63)	3.25 (83)	3.11 (79)	4.16 (106)	3.91 (99)	3.94 (100)	3.19 (81)	3.28 (83)	2.46 (62)	3.37 (86)	2.97 (75)	38.87 (987)
Average snowfall inches (cm)	10.5 (27)	9.3 (24)	6.6 (17)	1.2 (3.0)	0 (0)	0 (0)	0 (0)	0 (0)	0 (0)	0.2 (0.51)	2.1 (5.3)	7.9 (20)	37.8 (96)
Average precipitation days (≥ 0.01 in)	16	14	14	14	15	12	12	11	11	13	14	15	162
Average snowy days (≥ 0.1 in)	12	10	5	1	0	0	0	0	0	0	3	8	38
Source: NOAA

== Demographics ==
Historical population
Census	Pop.	Note	%±
1810	1,301		—
1820	1,687		29.7%
1830	1,816		7.6%
1840	2,062		13.5%
1850	2,662		29.1%
1860	3,587		34.7%
1870	3,571		−0.4%
1880	4,292		20.2%
1890	7,063		64.6%
1900	7,670		8.6%
1910	18,778		144.8%
1920	21,480		14.4%
1930	24,545		14.3%
1940	26,166		6.6%
1950	26,280		0.4%
1960	23,545		−10.4%
1970	19,827		−15.8%
1980	18,363		−7.4%
1990	15,864		−13.6%
2000	15,268		−3.8%
2010	13,663		−10.5%
2020	13,176		−3.6%
2025 (est.)	13,377		1.5%
U.S. Decennial Census

=== 2020 census ===
As of the 2020 census, Washington had a population of 13,176. The median age was 37.6 years. 17.0% of residents were under the age of 18 and 15.9% of residents were 65 years of age or older. For every 100 females there were 98.2 males, and for every 100 females age 18 and over there were 97.4 males age 18 and over.

100.0% of residents lived in urban areas, while 0.0% lived in rural areas.

There were 5,628 households in Washington, of which 21.3% had children under the age of 18 living in them. Of all households, 25.9% were married-couple households, 26.7% were households with a male householder and no spouse or partner present, and 37.4% were households with a female householder and no spouse or partner present. About 42.6% of all households were made up of individuals and 14.2% had someone living alone who was 65 years of age or older.

There were 6,604 housing units, of which 14.8% were vacant. The homeowner vacancy rate was 2.8% and the rental vacancy rate was 11.1%.

Racial composition as of the 2020 census
Race	Number	Percent
White	9,533	72.4%
Black or African American	2,140	16.2%
American Indian and Alaska Native	34	0.3%
Asian	156	1.2%
Native Hawaiian and Other Pacific Islander	12	0.1%
Some other race	232	1.8%
Two or more races	1,069	8.1%
Hispanic or Latino (of any race)	464	3.5%

=== 2010 census ===
As of the 2010 census there were 13,663 people living in the city. The population density was 4,140.3 people per square mile. The racial makeup of the city was (10,373) 75.92% White, (2,803) 20.52% African American, (131) 0.96% Asian, and (107) 0.78% from other races. Hispanic or Latino of any race were (249) 1.82% of the population.

=== 2000 census ===
As of the 2000 census, there were 15,268 people, 6,259 households, and 3,486 families living in the city. The population density was 5,199.2 people per square mile (2,007.4 people/km^{2}). There were 7,111 housing units at an average density of 2,421.5 per square mile (934.9/km^{2}). The racial makeup of the city was 81.88% White, 14.60% African American, 0.15% Native American, 0.45% Asian, 0.02% Pacific Islander, 0.61% from other races, and 2.29% from two or more races. Hispanic or Latino of any race were 0.94% of the population.

There were 6,259 households, out of which 24.3% had children under the age of 18 living with them, 34.7% were married couples living together, 17.1% had a female householder with no husband present, and 44.3% were non-families. 38.0% of all households were made up of individuals, and 15.8% had someone living alone who was 65 years of age or older. The average household size was 2.20 and the average family size was 2.91.

In the city, the population was spread out, with 21.2% under the age of 18, 13.2% from 18 to 24, 28.0% from 25 to 44, 20.9% from 45 to 64, and 16.7% who were 65 years of age or older. The median age was 36 years. For every 100 females, there were 88.3 males. For every 100 females age 18 and over, there were 84.6 males.

The median income for a household in the city was $25,764, and the median income for a family was $34,862. Males had a median income of $29,977 versus $22,374 for females. The per capita income for the city was $14,818. 20.7% of the population and 16.4% of families were below the poverty line. Out of the total population, 29.2% of those under the age of 18 and 15.8% of those 65 and older were living below the poverty line.

=== Religion ===
Founded in 1891, Beth Israel Congregation is the only synagogue in Washington County.

== Economy ==
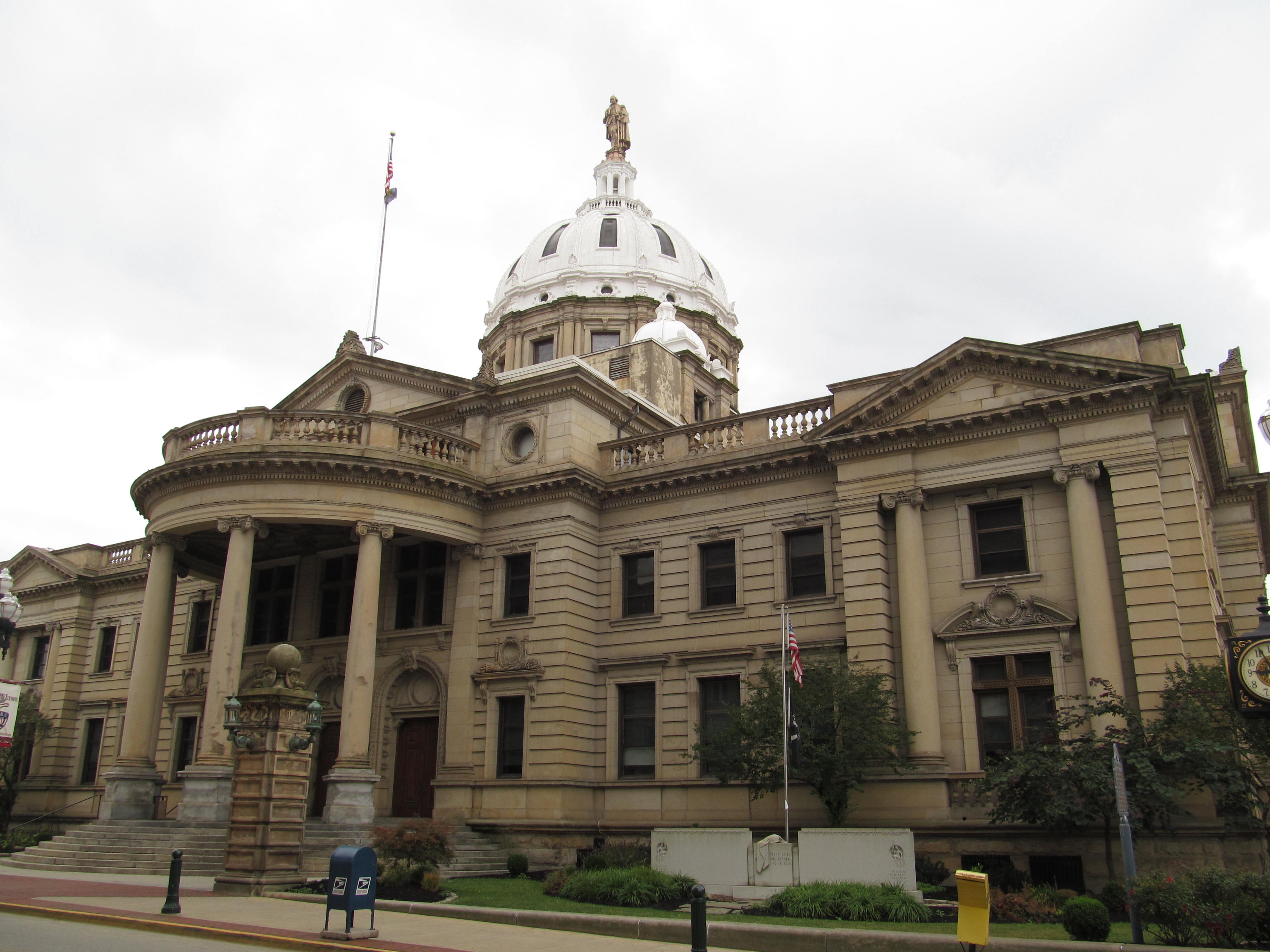
The Washington County Courthouse

Major employers in Washington include UPMC Washington, the government of Washington County, and Washington & Jefferson College.

== Arts and culture ==
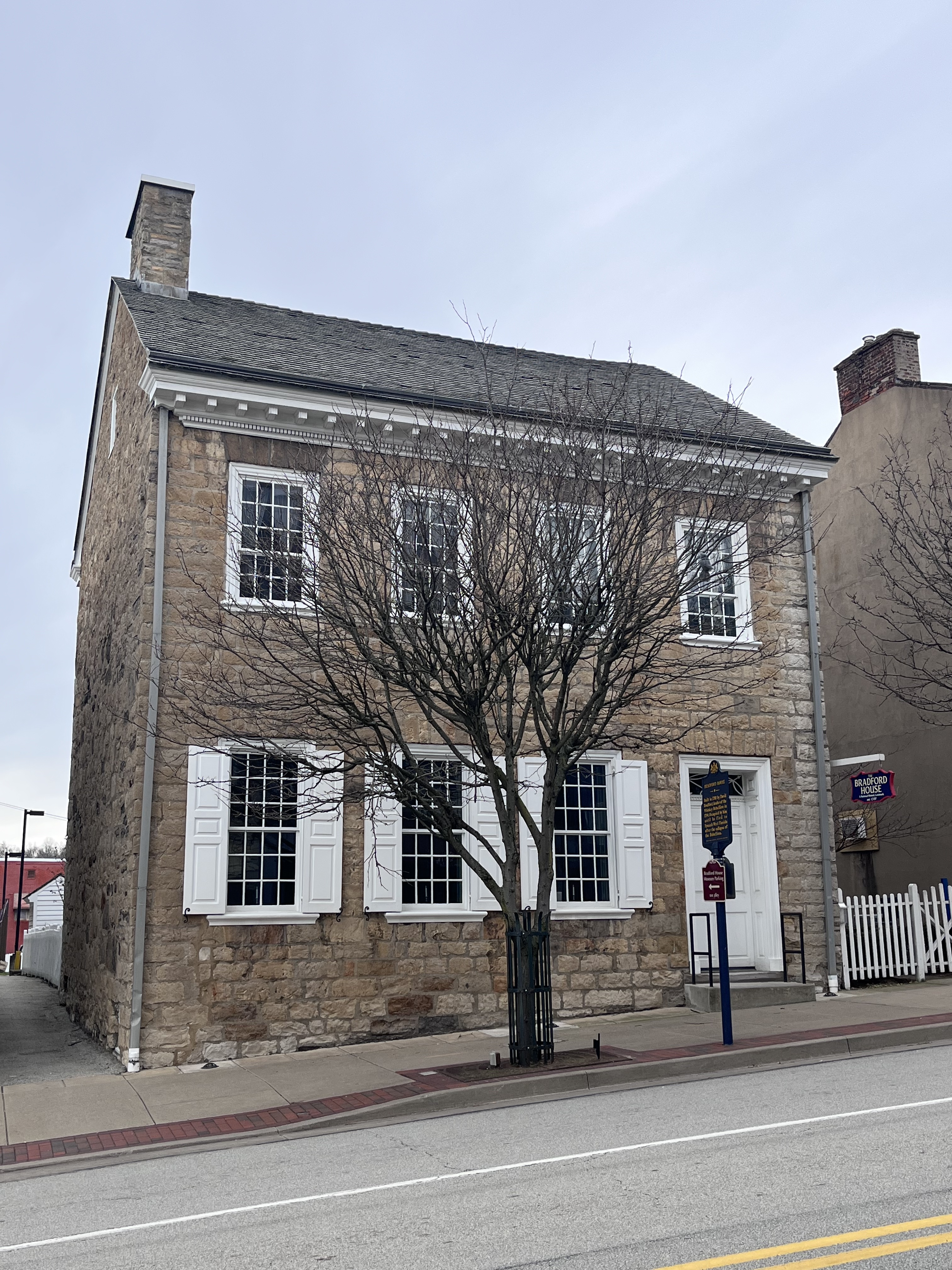
David Bradford House

Washington Symphony Orchestra, founded 2002, offers four to five concerts annually. The Washington Community Theatre presents several musicals and other productions throughout the year, with a feature production held each June in the Main Pavilion at Washington Park. WCT celebrated its 40th anniversary in 2009.

Also in the city are two historic homes, that of David Bradford on South Main Street and that of F. Julius LeMoyne on East Maiden Street. Bradford's home was later the birthplace of American realist author Rebecca Harding Davis in 1831. LeMoyne was an ardent abolitionist whose home was part of the Underground Railroad; LeMoyne was a doctor who also built the first crematory in America. The David Bradford House and F. Julius LeMoyne House are listed on the National Register of Historic Places, along with the Administration Building, Washington and Jefferson College, Dr. Joseph Maurer House, Pennsylvania Railroad Freight Station, Washington Armory, Washington County Courthouse, and Washington County Jail.

Washington is home to PONY Baseball and Softball's headquarters and the annual PONY League World Series (for 13- and 14-year-old players). The PONY League World Series is held at historic Lew Hays Field located in the city's Washington Park. The Washington Wild Things minor league baseball team has been based out of the city since 1997. On January 27, 2006, to commemorate the Pittsburgh Steelers' appearance in Super Bowl XL, the city council voted to symbolically rename the city "Steelers, Pennsylvania" through February 5, 2006.

== Education ==
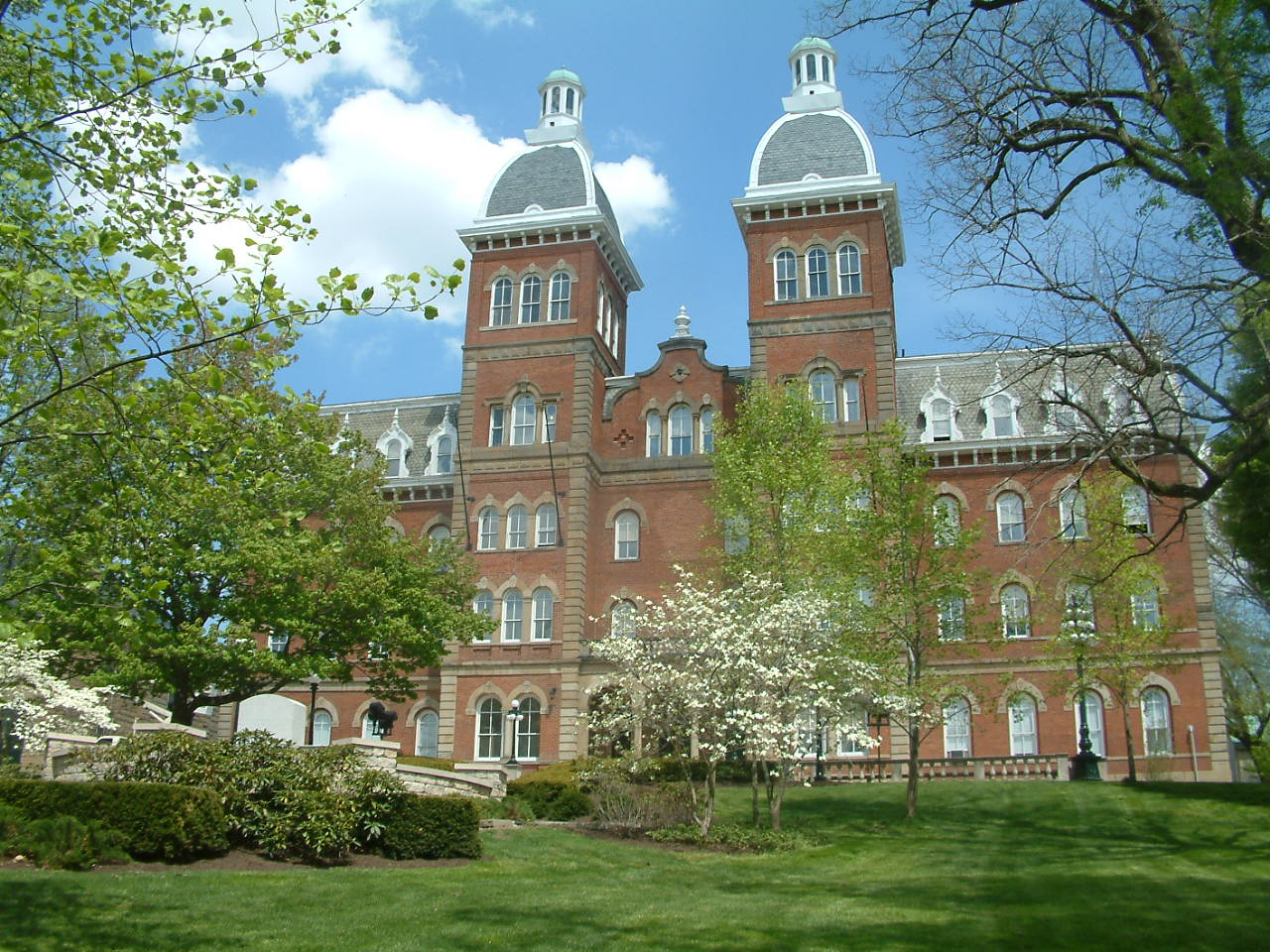
Old Main at Washington & Jefferson College

Washington is home to Washington & Jefferson College, a small, co-educational private liberal arts college which traces its origin to three log cabin colleges in Washington County established by three Presbyterian missionaries to the American frontier in the 1780s. The modern institution was established in 1865 from the merger of Washington College in Washington and Jefferson College in Canonsburg. Located in downtown Washington, the college enrolls approximately 1,500 students. The 60-acre (0.24 km^{2}) campus has more than 40 buildings, with the oldest dating to 1793. The college's academic emphasis is on the liberal arts and the sciences, with a focus on preparing students for graduate and professional schools. Washington & Jefferson College typically places within the top 100 or first tier of ranked liberal arts colleges.

Washington is served by the public Washington School District, which includes four schools; Washington High School (grades 9–12), Washington Junior High School (grades 7–8), Washington Park Intermediate School (grades 4–6), and Washington Park Elementary School (grades K-3), in addition to an alternative online environment.

== Media ==
The Observer-Reporter is a daily newspaper founded in 1808. Washington's commercial radio station is WJPA (95.3 FM / 1450 AM).

== Notable people ==
- Edward Goodrich Acheson, chemist
- Ernest F. Acheson, newspaper editor and member of the U.S. House of Representatives
- Absalom Baird, Union Army general and Medal of Honor recipient
- Susan Porter Benson, historian and academic
- Jim Carmichael, member of the Ohio House of Representatives
- Alexander Clark, businessman and activist who served as United States Ambassador to Liberia
- Rebecca Harding Davis, author and journalist
- William Curtis Farabee (1865–1925), anthropologist
- Emerson Hart, lead singer and songwriter of Tonic
- Pete Henry, American football player, coach, and athletic administrator
- Paul Jacobs, first organist to receive a Grammy Award
- John Kanzius, inventor, radio and TV engineer
- Isaac Leet, member of the U.S. House of Representatives
- Francis Julius LeMoyne, medical doctor, philanthropist and abolitionist
- Walter Joseph Marm Jr., retired United States Army colonel and Medal of Honor recipient
- Edward Martin, United States Senator from Pennsylvania and 32nd governor of Pennsylvania
- Dave McCormick, U.S. senator for Pennsylvania
- Philo McGiffin, naval advisor to the Imperial Chinese Navy during the First Sino-Japanese War
- Robert Munce, third president of Suffolk University
- Dave Pahanish, singer-songwriter
- Dave Palone, harness racing driver
- George Parros, former professional ice hockey player
- Joey Powers, pop singer and songwriter
- Michael Seibert, figure skating choreographer and former competitive ice dancer
- Charles Sheedy, member of the West Virginia House of Delegates
- Paige Spara, actress
- Gene Steratore, former American football official in the National Football League
- Maria Judson Strean, painter
- Sylvester Terkay, retired professional wrestler, actor, and mixed martial artist
- Joseph A. Walker, World War II pilot, experimental physicist, NASA test pilot, and astronaut who was the first person to fly an airplane to space
- Charles Fremont West, track athlete, college football player and coach, and physician
- Dennis E. Wisnosky, former chief architect of the United States Department of Defense Business Mission Area
- Octavia B. Wynbush, African American author and educator
- Bud Yorkin, film and television producer, director, screenwriter, and actor

== See also ==
- Shorty's Lunch
