= Quamby Bend, Tasmania =

Quamby Bend Tasmania
- Coordinates: 41°29′03″S 146°51′45″E
- Population: 26 (2016 census)
- Postcode(s): 7292
- Location: 7 km (4 mi) N of Westbury
- LGA(s): Meander Valley
- Region: Launceston
- State electorate(s): Lyons
- Federal division(s): Lyons
Localities around Quamby Bend:
Westbury	Selbourne	Selbourne
Westbury	Quamby Bend	Hagley
Westbury	Hagley, Westbury	Hagley

Quamby Bend is a rural locality in the local government area (LGA) of Meander Valley in the Launceston LGA region of Tasmania. The locality is about 7 kilometres (4.3 mi) north of the town of Westbury. The 2016 census recorded a population of 26 for the state suburb of Quamby Bend.

== History ==
Quamby Bend was gazetted as a locality in 1968.

The name comes from Quamby Estate, the property established in the district by Sir Richard Dry, who was Premier of Tasmania from 1866 to 1869. It is believed to be an Aboriginal word for “mercy” or “stop”.

== Geography ==
The Meander River forms the western, northern and part of the eastern boundaries.

== Road infrastructure ==
National Route 1 (Bass Highway) passes to the south. Access to the locality is provided by Emu Plain Road.
