= Haynan Creek =

Stream in Pennsylvania, USA

Haynan Creek Tributary to Cross Creek
- Location of Haynan Creek mouth Haynan Creek (the United States)

Location
- Country: United States
- State: Pennsylvania
- County: Washington (PA)

Physical characteristics
- Source: Hanen Run divide
  - location: about 1 mile west-northwest of West Middletown, Pennsylvania
  - coordinates: 40°14′49″N 080°26′36″W
  - elevation: 1,080 ft (330 m)
- Mouth: Cross Creek
  - location: about 1 mile southeast of Avella, Pennsylvania
  - coordinates: 40°16′03″N 080°26′30″W
  - elevation: 932 ft (284 m)
- Length: 1.48 mi (2.38 km)
- Basin size: 1.37 square miles (3.5 km^{2})
- Discharge
  - location: Cross Creek
  - average: 1.70 cu ft/s (0.048 m^{3}/s) at mouth with Cross Creek

Basin features
- Progression: Cross Creek → Ohio River → Mississippi River → Gulf of Mexico
- River system: Ohio River
- Tributaries
  - left: unnamed tributaries
  - right: unnamed tributaries
- Bridges: Seminary Road

Haynan Creek is a 1.48 mi (2.38 km) long 1st order tributary to Cross Creek in Washington County, Pennsylvania. This is the only stream of this name in the United States.

== Course ==
Haynan Creek rises about 1 mile west-northwest of West Middletown, Pennsylvania, in Washington County and then flows north to join Cross Creek about 1 mile southeast of Avella.

== Watershed ==
Haynan Creek drains 1.37 square miles (3.5 km^{2}) of area, receives about 40.1 in/year of precipitation, has a wetness index of 317.57, and is about 66% forested.

== See also ==
- List of Rivers of Pennsylvania
