= Ralph Cindrich =

American football player and agent (born 1949)

Ralph Edward Cindrich
Profile
- Position: Linebacker

Personal information
- Born: October 29, 1949 (age 77); Washington, Pennsylvania, U.S.

Career information
- High school: Avella (Avella, Pennsylvania)
- College: Pittsburgh (1968-1971)
- NFL draft: 1972: 5th round, 119th overall pick

Career history
- New England Patriots (1972); Houston Oilers (1973–1974); Denver Broncos (1975)*; Houston Oilers (1975)
- * Offseason or practice squad member only
- Stats at Pro Football Reference

Ralph Edward Cindrich (born October 29, 1949) is a former sports agent and professional football player. He was a linebacker for the New England Patriots, Houston Oilers and Denver Broncos, and established a sports agency after his retirement.

In his career as an NFL agent, Cindrich represented players such as Hall of Famer Dermontti Dawson and All-Pros Jeff Christy, Gary Clark, Shane Conlan, James Farrior, Bill Fralic, Kent Hull, John Offerdahl, Jeff Saturday, Mark Stepnoski, Al Toon and Will Wolford. The contract Cindrich negotiated for Wolford with the Indianapolis Colts in 1993 included a clause guaranteeing Wolford to remain the team's highest paid player. The provision was outlawed after the signing of the deal; as such, no other player in history may have that guarantee. The deal was featured prominently in Michael Lewis' book The Blind Side: Evolution of a Game.

== High school ==
Cindrich was born in Washington, Pennsylvania, to Anthony and Stella Cindrich. In the fall of 1963, he attended nearby Avella High School, where he played on the wrestling and football teams. In 1966 and 1967, Cindrich won Western Pennsylvania Heavyweight Championship, going undefeated and untied, and was twice the Pennsylvania State runner-up in the unlimited weight class.

As a linebacker and center for Avella High's varsity football team, he was named All-Western Pennsylvania in 1966 and 1967. In 1967, Cindrich was named the Most Valuable Player of Western Pennsylvania Class B Football while also serving as captain of the state's All-Star "Big 33" team that played against a Texas All-Star football team.

== College career ==
Cindrich was recruited by the University of Pittsburgh. As a wrestler, he won the NCAA Eastern Heavyweight Championship in 1969, in addition to being named an All-American and taking 4th in the NCAA Tournament. Cindrich played solely as a linebacker for the football team and adapted quickly, recording 17 tackles against UCLA in his first start. He also broke his ankle in the same game, ending his season.

After redshirting during the rest of the 1968 season, Cindrich returned as a starter in 1969. In the Panthers' second game on the road against the Oklahoma Sooners, he led the team with 21 tackles. Later that year, he was named to the All-East Team, All-Conference Team, and All-American team. In 1970, Cindrich missed time after a knee injury in the season's opener against UCLA.

The injury to his knee kept Cindrich from playing spring football as a senior in 1971, but he was ready to play once the season started. In the opener, the Panthers traveled to the Rose Bowl and upset the UCLA Bruins, 29–25. Cindrich was named Lineman of the Week by the Associated Press for his twelve tackles and two fumble recoveries in the game. Cindrich was named to the All-East Team, All-Conference Team, and Associated Press All-American team for a second time in 1971.

== Professional career ==
The Atlanta Falcons selected Cindrich in the fifth round with the 119th overall pick in the 1972 NFL draft. He was released near the end of the preseason. A week later, New England claimed Cindrich off waivers and was named AP Player of the Week in a game against the eventual Super Bowl Champion Miami Dolphins. New England cut him before the 1973 season, but he was picked up by the Houston Oilers, whom he played for during the next two seasons. After being cut by the Denver Broncos during the 1975 preseason, the Oilers resigned from Cindrich for the remainder. He retired following the 1975 season.

Cindrich has been inducted into the Western Pennsylvania Hall of Fame, the Italian-American Sports Hall of Fame, the Croatian American Sports Hall of Fame, the Washington County Hall of Fame and the Avella High School Hall of Fame. He was selected to the University of Pittsburgh All Time Football Team, Walk of Fame, and received Washington County's Distinguished Citizen Award in Football.

== Agent career ==
During his tenure with the Oilers, Cindrich began law school at nearby South Texas College of Law Houston. After his retirement from football, he founded sports agency Cindrich & Company in 1977 before graduating with his Juris Doctor degree in 1978. Cindrich's first major client was offensive tackle prospect Mark May, who was selected 20th overall by the Washington Redskins in the 1981 NFL draft. May held out before signing his first contract in late July. May retained Cindrich as his agent for the rest of his playing career as well as for post-retirement deals as an announcer and analyst.

Cindrich represented two highly-touted prospects in the in 1985 NFL draft: guard Bill Fralic who went second overall and wide receiver Al Toon who went tenth. Cindrich told the press that Fralic did not want to play for the Minnesota Vikings, the original owners of the second overall pick. The Vikings traded the pick to the Atlanta Falcons, who selected Fralic. Fralic's rookie contract was the highest of any lineman in the draft, including first overall selection Bruce Smith. The size of Fralic's deal reportedly slowed negotiations for other draft picks. Toon also used Cindrich's aggressive tactics, holding out until the season had already started, before signing for $1.6 million over five years.

Cindrich represented Wisconsin offensive tackle Paul Gruber for the draft in 1988, who was selected fourth overall by the Tampa Bay Buccaneers. Gruber missed four weeks of training camp but signed a $3.8 million deal with the team in early August. The deal was considered to be highly favourable to Gruber and would assist other offensive linemen achieve higher contracts. In 1989, Cindrich and Peter Johnson helped facilitate the Herschel Walker trade. As part of his new contract with the Vikings, Walker received $1.25 million in cash and other considerations, doubling his previous salary. He negotiated new contracts for Shane Conlan, Kent Hull, John Offerdahl and Will Wolford around the same time.

In the 1990s, Cindrich began representing wide receiver Gary Clark, tight end Eric Green and center Mark Stepnoski. Stepnoski was one of many centers represented by Cindrich; at one point, he simultaneously represented Stepnoski, Hull, LeCharles Bentley, Jeff Christy, Dermontti Dawson, Mike Flynn, Tim Ruddy and Jeff Saturday.

One of Cindrich's most valuable clients was offensive tackle Will Wolford. Cindrich had negotiated his rookie deal and second contract, both with the Buffalo Bills, as well as his third NFL contract in which he signed with the Indianapolis Colts as a free agent. Wolford's new contract made him the highest paid lineman in the NFL at $7.65 million over three years, in addition to guaranteeing that Wolford would remain the highest paid player on the team. In 1995, Wolford signed a four-year, $10 million with the Pittsburgh Steelers when that contract expired, again negotiated by Cindrich.

Cindrich sold his sports agency to Debartolo Sports in 2005, though he consulted with Debartolo on certain contracts for several years. He has been considered in the upper echelon of NFL Agents according to Pro Football Weekly, USA Today, the Denver Post, the Chicago Times, and the Dallas Morning News. The Sporting News twice ranked him as one of the top 100 most powerful people in sports.

== Personal life ==
Cindrich and his family lived in Mt. Lebanon, Pennsylvania for much of his post-NFL career in the former home of Mario Lemeiux. Cindrich and his wife Mary now live in Marina Del Rey, California. His daughter Christina and his son Michael both live in California.

In 2015, Cindrich published his memoir NFL BRAWLER: A Player-Turned-Agent's Forty Years in the Bloody Trenches of the National Football League.
