= Potrock Run =

Stream in West Virginia, USA

Potrock Run Tributary to Cross Creek
- Location of Potrock Run mouth Potrock Run (the United States)

Location
- Country: United States
- State: West Virginia
- County: Brooke

Physical characteristics
- Source: Pierce Run divide
  - location: Fowlerstown, West Virginia
  - coordinates: 40°16′52″N 080°33′02″W
  - elevation: 1,020 ft (310 m)
- Mouth: Cross Creek
  - location: about 1 mile east of Louise, West Virginia
  - coordinates: 40°18′08″N 080°32′44″W
  - elevation: 712 ft (217 m)
- Length: 1.68 mi (2.70 km)
- Basin size: 1.18 square miles (3.1 km^{2})
- Discharge
  - location: Cross Creek
  - average: 1.41 cu ft/s (0.040 m^{3}/s) at mouth with Cross Creek

Basin features
- Progression: Cross Creek → Ohio River → Mississippi River → Gulf of Mexico
- River system: Ohio River
- Tributaries
  - left: unnamed tributaries
  - right: unnamed tributaries
- Bridges: Pot Rock Road (x2)

Potrock Run is a 1.68 mi (2.70 km) long 1st order tributary to Cross Creek in Brooke County, West Virginia. This is the only stream of this name in the United States.

== Course ==
Potrock Run rises at Fowlerstown, West Virginia, in Brooke County, West Virginia and then flows generally north to join Cross Creek about 1 mile east of Louise, West Virginia.

== Watershed ==
Potrock Run drains 1.18 square miles (3.1 km^{2}) of area, receives about 40.1 in/year of precipitation, has a wetness index of 275.88, and is about 69% forested.

== See also ==
- List of Rivers of West Virginia
