= North Fork Cross Creek =

Stream in Pennsylvania, USA

North Fork Cross Creek Tributary to Cross Creek
- Location of North Fork Cross Creek mouth North Fork Cross Creek (the United States)

Location
- Country: United States
- State: Pennsylvania
- County: Washington (PA)

Physical characteristics
- Source: Harman Creek divide
  - location: about 0.5 miles west of Langeloth, Pennsylvania
  - coordinates: 40°21′53″N 080°25′52″W
  - elevation: 1,140 ft (350 m)
- Mouth: Cross Creek
  - location: Avella, Pennsylvania
  - coordinates: 40°16′36″N 080°27′41″W
  - elevation: 902 ft (275 m)
- Length: 8.20 mi (13.20 km)
- Basin size: 16.32 square miles (42.3 km^{2})
- Discharge
  - location: Cross Creek
  - average: 19.36 cu ft/s (0.548 m^{3}/s) at mouth with Cross Creek

Basin features
- Progression: Cross Creek → Ohio River → Mississippi River → Gulf of Mexico
- River system: Ohio River
- Tributaries
  - left: Middle Fork Cross Creek
  - right: unnamed tributaries
- Bridges: Lee Road (x2), Strope Road, Cedar Grove Road, Cross Creek Road (x2)

North Fork Cross Creek is a 8.20 mi (13.20 km) long 3rd order tributary to Cross Creek in Washington County, Pennsylvania. This is the only stream of this name in the United States.

== Course ==
North Fork Cross Creek rises about 0.5 miles west of Langeloth in Washington County and then flows south-southwest to join Cross Creek at Avella.

== Watershed ==
North Fork Cross Creek drains 16.32 square miles (42.3 km^{2}) of area, receives about 40.4 in/year of precipitation, has a wetness index of 334.43, and is about 53% forested.

== See also ==
- List of Rivers of Pennsylvania
