= Ebenezer Run =

Stream in West Virginia, USA

Ebenezer Run Tributary to Cross Creek
- Location of Ebenezer Run mouth Ebenezer Run (the United States)

Location
- Country: United States
- State: West Virginia
- County: Brooke

Physical characteristics
- Source: Mechling Run divide
  - location: pond at Mechling Hill
  - coordinates: 40°20′44″N 080°32′34″W
  - elevation: 1,160 ft (350 m)
- Mouth: Cross Creek
  - location: Louise, West Virginia
  - coordinates: 40°18′19″N 080°33′43″W
  - elevation: 699 ft (213 m)
- Length: 3.14 mi (5.05 km)
- Basin size: 5.50 square miles (14.2 km^{2})
- Discharge
  - location: Cross Creek
  - average: 2.48 cu ft/s (0.070 m^{3}/s) at mouth with Cross Creek

Basin features
- Progression: Cross Creek → Ohio River → Mississippi River → Gulf of Mexico
- River system: Ohio River
- Tributaries
  - left: unnamed tributaries
  - right: unnamed tributaries
- Bridges: WV 7

Ebenezer Run, historically known as Ebnexer Run, is a 3.14 mi (5.05 km) long 1st order tributary to Cross Creek in Brooke County, West Virginia.

== Variant names ==
According to the Geographic Names Information System, it has also been known historically as:

== Course ==
Ebenezer Run rises in a pond at Mechling Hill, in Brooke County, West Virginia and then flows south-southwest to join Cross Creek at Louise, West Virginia.

== Watershed ==
Ebenezer Run drains 5.50 square miles (14.2 km^{2}) of area, receives about 40.1 in/year of precipitation, has a wetness index of 303.71, and is about 78% forested.

== See also ==
- List of Rivers of West Virginia
