= Parmar Run =

Stream in West Virginia, USA

Parmar Run Tributary to Scott Run
- Location of Parmar Run mouth Parmar Run (the United States)

Location
- Country: United States
- States: West Virginia; Pennsylvania
- Counties: Brooke (WV); Washington (PA)

Physical characteristics
- Source: Harman Creek divide
  - location: about 2 miles east of Mechling Hill on the Pennsylvania State Line
  - coordinates: 40°20′58″N 080°31′09″W
  - elevation: 1,140 ft (350 m)
- Mouth: Scott Run
  - location: Scott Run, West Virginia
  - coordinates: 40°18′05″N 080°31′50″W
  - elevation: 741 ft (226 m)
- Length: 3.54 mi (5.70 km)
- Basin size: 2.60 square miles (6.7 km^{2})
- Discharge
  - location: Scott Run
  - average: 3.07 cu ft/s (0.087 m^{3}/s) at mouth with Scott Run

Basin features
- Progression: Scott Run → Cross Creek → Ohio River → Mississippi River → Gulf of Mexico
- River system: Ohio River
- Tributaries
  - left: unnamed tributaries
  - right: unnamed tributaries
- Bridges: Amspoker Road (x2)

Parmar Run is a 3.54 mi (5.70 km) long 1st order tributary to Scott Run in Brooke County, West Virginia. This is the only stream of this name in the United States.

== Course ==
Parmar Run rises about 2 miles east of Mechling Hill in Washington County on the Pennsylvania State Line and then flows southwest into West Virginia to join Scott Run at Scott Run, West Virginia.

== Watershed ==
Parmar Run drains 2.60 square miles (6.7 km^{2}) of area, receives about 40.2 in/year of precipitation, has a wetness index of 317.44, and is about 54% forested.

== See also ==
- List of Rivers of West Virginia
- List of Rivers of Pennsylvania
