= Private Islands (TV series) =

Television series

- Presented by: Christina Cindrich (2010–2015); Ashley Colburn (2011); Sarah Tinsley (2012); Tabitha Lipkin (2015–2016); Amber Wyatt (2018–2021)
- Country of origin: United States
- Original language: English
- No. of episodes: 52

Production
- Running time: Approx. 30 minutes

Original release
- Network: AWE
- Release: October 26, 2010 – April 25, 2021

Private Islands is an American travel television series. Host Amber Wyatt goes on adventures around the world, exploring not only private islands, but luxurious resorts, and the expansive cultures in each location. The show is a product of AWE (A Wealth of Entertainment) network.

In 2023, it was announced that Amazon Fire TV would be including AWE content on its platform, this included the travel series Private Islands.

== Hosts ==
Amber Wyatt is the fifth host of Private Islands. Christina Cindrich is the show's original host. Since then, each host has hosted one season each. Wyatt is currently working on her second season with the show.

== Awards ==
On July 17, 2015, Private Islands won an Emmy Award for the episode "The Magic of Venice Carnevale." Christina Cindrich was the producer and host at the time. The award was for "Arts/Entertainment Program/Special".

== Episodes ==
=== Season One (2010–2013) ===
1. Islands of the Bahamas – October 26, 2010
2. Musha Cay and the Islands of Copperfield Bay – June 29, 2011
3. Desroches – August 7, 2011
4. Emerald Cay – March 24, 2012
5. Turks and Caicos – April 1, 2012
6. French Polynesia – October 21, 2012
7. Peter Island – December 16, 2012
8. Roatan – December 16, 2012
9. Florida Keys – January 26, 2013
10. Belize – March 9, 2013
11. Calivigny Island – May 4, 2013

=== Season Two (2013–2015) ===
1. Little Bokeelia – June 1, 2013
2. Fiji: Paradise in the Pacific – July 7, 2013
3. Fiji: Exotic Escape – August 31, 2013
4. Jumby Bay – September 28, 2013
5. Four Seasons Maldives – November 23, 2013
6. Christina's Top 10 – December 14, 2013
7. Phuket, Thailand – February 22, 2014
8. Isla Simca – April 12, 2014
9. The Grenadines – July 26, 2014
10. Laucala – September 20, 2014
11. Bora Bora – December 28, 2014
12. Zambia – April 4, 2015

=== Season Three (2015–2016) ===
1. Philippines – July 23, 2015
2. Palau – September 12, 2015
3. Scrub Island – December 6, 2015
4. Laamu – January 1, 2016
5. St. Lucia – March 5, 2016

=== Season Four (2018–2021) ===
1. Lizard Island – April 7, 2018
2. Coco Plum Island Resort, Belize – May 6, 2018
3. Zaya Nurai – July 4, 2018
4. Fowl Cay – July 4, 2018
5. Dubai – August 24, 2018
6. Hawaii – August 26, 2018
7. Calala Island – November 11, 2018
8. Wakaya Island – November 11, 2018
9. Hamilton Island – November 11, 2018
10. Sumba – November 11, 2018
11. Pulau Joyo – December 25, 2018
12. Sandals Cay – January 1, 2019
13. Best of Paradise – January 1, 2019
14. Parrot Cay – January 1, 2019
15. Six Senses Zil Pasyon – February 23, 2019
16. Thorntree Lodge – March 23, 2019
17. Six Senses Laamu – May 13, 2019
18. Royal Chundu – July 17, 2019
19. Soneva Fushi – September 1, 2019
20. Soneva Jani – September 1, 2019
21. Maalifushi – November 16, 2019
22. Bedarra Island – December 22, 2020
23. Makepeace Island – December 23, 2020
24. Orpheus Island – April 25, 2021
