= West Middletown =

West Middletown may refer to:

- Middletown, Ohio
- West Middletown, Pennsylvania (borough)
- West Middletown Township, Delaware County, Pennsylvania
