= South Fork Cross Creek =

Stream in Pennsylvania, USA

South Fork Cross Creek Tributary to Cross Creek
- Location of South Fork Cross Creek mouth South Fork Cross Creek (the United States)

Location
- Country: United States
- State: Pennsylvania
- County: Washington (PA)

Physical characteristics
- Source: Chartiers Run divide
  - location: about 1 mile southwest of Hickory, Pennsylvania
  - coordinates: 40°16′40″N 080°19′52″W
  - elevation: 1,240 ft (380 m)
- Mouth: Cross Creek
  - location: about 1.5 miles southeast of Avella, Pennsylvania
  - coordinates: 40°15′59″N 080°26′05″W
  - elevation: 942 ft (287 m)
- Length: 6.47 mi (10.41 km)
- Basin size: 12.34 square miles (32.0 km^{2})
- Discharge
  - location: Cross Creek
  - average: 14.68 cu ft/s (0.416 m^{3}/s) at mouth with Cross Creek

Basin features
- Progression: Cross Creek → Ohio River → Mississippi River → Gulf of Mexico
- River system: Ohio River
- Tributaries
  - left: unnamed tributaries
  - right: unnamed tributaries
- Bridges: Caldwell Road (x2), Old Ridge Road, County Park Road, Ihnat Lane

South Fork Cross Creek is a 6.47 mi (10.41 km) long 2nd order tributary to Cross Creek in Washington County, Pennsylvania. This is the only stream of this name in the United States.

== Course ==
South Fork Cross Creek rises about 1 mile southwest of Hickory, Pennsylvania, in Washington County and then flows west-southwest to join Cross Creek about 1.5 miles southeast of Avella.

== Watershed ==
South Fork Cross Creek drains 12.34 square miles (32.0 km^{2}) of area, receives about 40.0 in/year of precipitation, has a wetness index of 342.64, and is about 49% forested.

== See also ==
- List of Rivers of Pennsylvania
