= Middle Fork Cross Creek =

Stream in Pennsylvania, USA

Middle Fork Cross Creek Tributary to North Fork Cross Creek
- Location of Middle Fork Cross Creek mouth Middle Fork Cross Creek (the United States)

Location
- Country: United States
- State: Pennsylvania
- County: Washington (PA)

Physical characteristics
- Source: unnamed tributary to Burgetts Creek divide
  - location: Cross Creek, Pennsylvania
  - coordinates: 40°19′45″N 080°24′47″W
  - elevation: 1,200 ft (370 m)
- Mouth: North Fork Cross Creek
  - location: Pattersons Mill, Pennsylvania
  - coordinates: 40°17′13″N 080°26′59″W
  - elevation: 932 ft (284 m)
- Length: 4.33 mi (6.97 km)
- Basin size: 4.60 square miles (11.9 km^{2})
- Discharge
  - location: North Fork Cross Creek
  - average: 5.68 cu ft/s (0.161 m^{3}/s) at mouth with North Fork Cross Creek

Basin features
- Progression: North Fork Cross Creek → Cross Creek → Ohio River → Mississippi River → Gulf of Mexico
- River system: Ohio River
- Tributaries
  - left: unnamed tributaries
  - right: unnamed tributaries
- Bridges: Rea Road, Parker Road, Patterson Road

Middle Fork Cross Creek is a 4.33 mi (6.97 km) long 2nd order tributary to North Fork Cross Creek in Washington County, Pennsylvania. This is the only stream of this name in the United States.

== Course ==
Middle Fork Cross Creek rises at Cross Creek, Pennsylvania, in Washington County and then flows southwest to join Cross Creek at Pattersons Mill.

== Watershed ==
Middle Fork Cross Creek drains 4.60 square miles (11.9 km^{2}) of area, receives about 40.3 in/year of precipitation, has a wetness index of 331.66, and is about 48% forested.

== See also ==
- List of Rivers of Pennsylvania
