= North Potrock Run =

Stream in West Virginia, US

North Potrock Run Tributary to Cross Creek
- Location of North Potrock Run mouth North Potrock Run (the United States)

Location
- Country: United States
- State: West Virginia
- County: Brooke

Physical characteristics
- Source: Mechling Run divide
  - location: about 1 mile southeast of Mechling Hill
  - coordinates: 40°20′28″N 080°31′15″W
  - elevation: 1,100 ft (340 m)
- Mouth: Cross Creek
  - location: about 1 mile east of Louise, West Virginia
  - coordinates: 40°18′09″N 080°32′49″W
  - elevation: 712 ft (217 m)
- Length: 2.92 mi (4.70 km)
- Basin size: 4.54 square miles (11.8 km^{2})
- Discharge
  - location: Cross Creek
  - average: 2.07 cu ft/s (0.059 m^{3}/s) at mouth with Cross Creek

Basin features
- Progression: Cross Creek → Ohio River → Mississippi River → Gulf of Mexico
- River system: Ohio River
- Tributaries
  - left: unnamed tributaries
  - right: unnamed tributaries
- Bridges: Abbey Lane, Marosi Lane, Tent Church Road, WV 7

North Potrock Run is a 2.92 mi (4.70 km) long 1st order tributary to Cross Creek in Brooke County, West Virginia. This is the only stream of this name in the United States.

== Variant names ==
According to the Geographic Names Information System, it has also been known historically as:

- Conns Run

== Course ==
North Potrock Run rises about 1 mile southeast of Mechling Hill, in Brooke County, West Virginia and then flows south-southwest to join Cross Creek about 1 mile east of Louise, West Virginia.

== Watershed ==
North Potrock Run drains 1.75 square miles (4.5 km^{2}) of area, receives about 40.1 in/year of precipitation, has a wetness index of 313.90, and is about 78% forested.

== See also ==
- List of Rivers of West Virginia
