= Bosley Run =

Stream in West Virginia, USA

Bosley Run Tributary to Cross Creek
- Location of Bosley Run mouth Bosley Run (the United States)

Location
- Country: United States
- State: West Virginia
- County: Brooke

Physical characteristics
- Source: unnamed tributary to Alexanders Run divide
  - location: about 1 mile west of Mechling Hill
  - coordinates: 40°21′01″N 080°33′34″W
  - elevation: 1,120 ft (340 m)
- Mouth: Cross Creek
  - location: about 0.5 miles northeast of Rockdale, West Virginia
  - coordinates: 40°18′29″N 080°34′20″W
  - elevation: 689 ft (210 m)
- Length: 3.27 mi (5.26 km)
- Basin size: 2.75 square miles (7.1 km^{2})
- Discharge
  - location: Cross Creek
  - average: 3.17 cu ft/s (0.090 m^{3}/s) at mouth with Cross Creek

Basin features
- Progression: Cross Creek → Ohio River → Mississippi River → Gulf of Mexico
- River system: Ohio River
- Tributaries
  - left: unnamed tributaries
  - right: unnamed tributaries
- Bridges: Red Oak Drive, Blacks Hollow Road, Cross Creek Road

Bosley Run is a 3.27 mi (5.26 km) long 1st order tributary to Cross Creek in Brooke County, West Virginia. This is the only stream of this name in the United States.

== Variant names ==
According to the Geographic Names Information System, it has also been known historically as:

- Bolsey Run

== Course ==
Bosley Run rises about 1 mile west of Mechling Hill, in Brooke County, West Virginia and then flows south-southwest to join Cross Creek about 0.5 miles northeast of Rockdale.

== Watershed ==
Bosley Run drains 2.75 square miles (7.1 km^{2}) of area, receives about 40.0 in/year of precipitation, has a wetness index of 315.01, and is about 62% forested.

== See also ==
- List of Rivers of West Virginia
