= Anna Dawbin =

Australian diarist (1816–1905)

- Born: Anna Maria Hadden; 24 November 1816; Exeter
- Died: 22 November 1905 (aged 88); Melbourne
- Known for: Diaries
- Spouses: Andrew Baxter; Richard Dawbin
- Children: no

Anna Maria Dawbin née Anna Maria Hadden (24 November 1816 – 22 November 1905) was a British Australian diarist.

== Life ==
Dawbin was born in Exeter in 1816 to Elizabeth and William Frederick Hadden. Her father was an army officer.

In 1834 she sailed for Van Diemen's Land as the new wife of Andrew Baxter who was in charge of transported convicts. It was on 24 September 1834 that she started her first of 32 diaries that are extant, although it is clear that she had always kept a diary up to that point. She arrived aboard the Augusta Jessie and she and Andrew lived in Hobart Town and Launceston. Her husband was an officer in the 50th (Queen's Own) Regiment of Foot and she established herself in Australian society. Her diary records that she was very "friendly" with Richard Dry who was to be Premier of Tasmania.

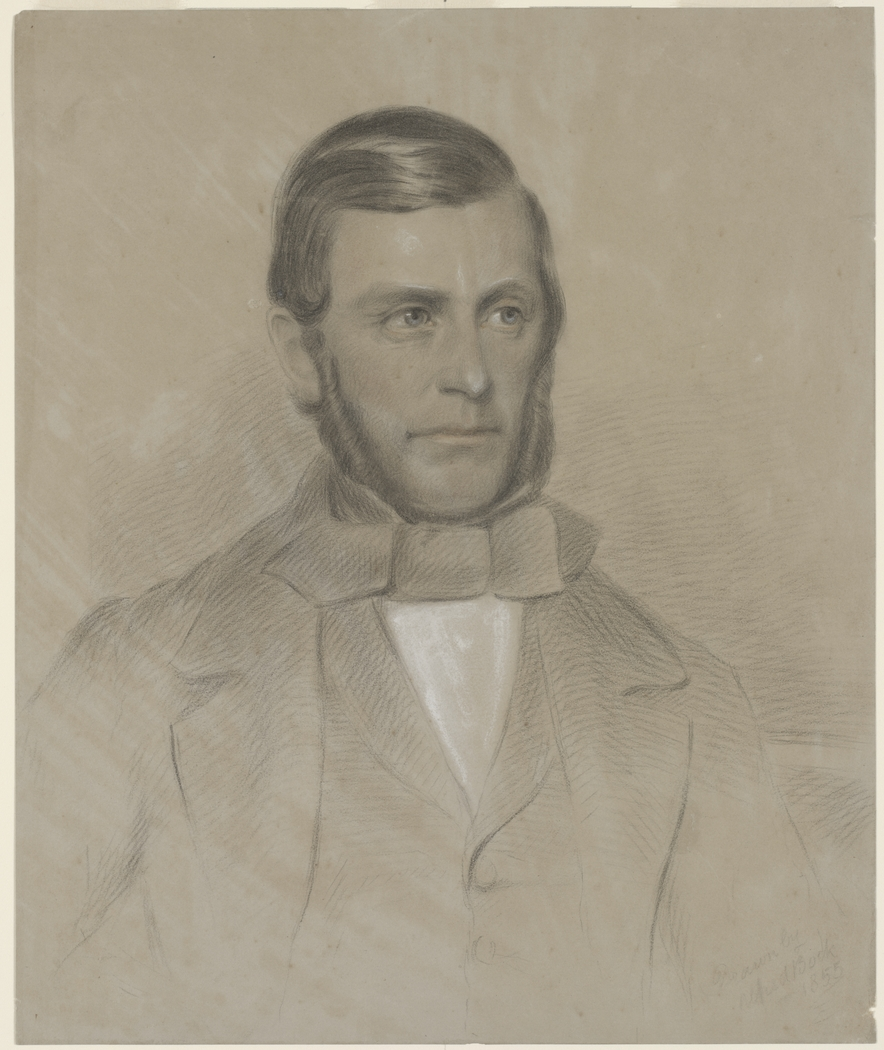
Anna's lover Richard Dry by Thomas Bock (ca. 1830-1855) Ref: a3171002 Mitchell Library, SLNSW

In 1839 Anna and Andrew decided to become squatters in New South Wales. Andrew had sold his commission and they hoped to retire on their success but by 1845 they were moving to a new location and the marriage was no longer happy. In 1849 she left her husband to care for her niece and nephew in Hobart after their mother died. She became their carer and returned with them to England. her brother remarried and no longer needed her as a foster mother in England. She had no purpose until she heard that her husband had become rich and he had committed suicide.

She returned to Australia in 1857 and met a young man named Richard Dawbin on board. They married on 1 September after she had sold what had been her husband's property. They bought a cattle station and Anna recorded her husband's failings. They were bankrupt by 1861 and she was left in Australia whilst her husband returned to England. She had male friends until 5 April 1865 when she sailed back on the Nimrod. She was reunited with her husband in Somerset. Her diary goes blank for a while. They returned to Australia where Dawbin failed to manage a salmon breeding station.

She published her earlier diaries as Memories of the Past in 1876 anonymously. However it is noted that these are edited decades later and lack the immediacy of the contemporary diaries.

== Death ==
Dawbin died in Melbourne in 1905. The 845,000 words that survived from her diaries were published as her diary in 1992.
