= Avella Area School District =

School district in Pennsylvania

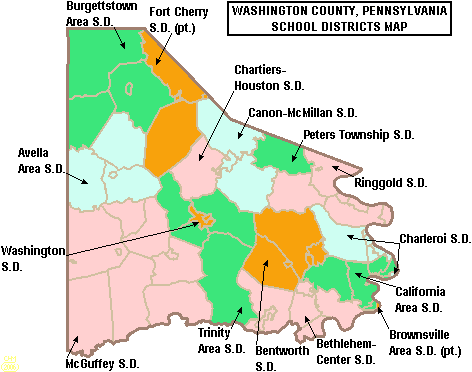

Address
- 1000 Avella Road Avella, Pennsylvania, 15312-2109; United States
- Coordinates: 40.274°N 80.4185°W

District information
- Type: Public

Other information
- Website: www.avellasd.org

The Avella Area School District is a small, rural public school district serving less than 680 students in grades K-12. Approximately 30 miles (48 km) southwest of Pittsburgh, Pennsylvania, the school district's two schools are located on a rural campus that also has a state certified day care. There is a preschool run in one of the elementary school's rented rooms but has no affiliation with the Avella Area School District. The district covers the Borough of West Middletown and Cross Creek Township, Hopewell Township and Independence Township in Washington County, Pennsylvania. The district is headquartered in the unincorporated Village of Avella. The Avella Area School District encompasses approximately 73 square miles (190 km^{2}). According to 2000 federal census data, it served a resident population of 4,497. By 2010, the district's population declined to 4,210 people. In 2009, the district residents' per capita income was $17,193, while the median family income was $42,246. In the Commonwealth, the median family income was $49,501 and the United States median family income was $49,445, in 2010. By 2013, the median household income in the United States rose to $52,100.

== Extracurriculars ==
Avella Area School District offers a wide variety of clubs, activities and an extensive sports program.

=== Sports ===
The District funds:

Boys

- Baseball - A
- Basketball- A
- Cross Country - A
- Football - A
- Rifle - AAAA
- Wrestling - AA

Girls

- Basketball - A
- Cross Country - A
- Rifle - AAAA
- Softball - A
- Girls' Tennis - AA
- Volleyball - A

Junior High School Sports (offered in grades 7 and 8)

Boys

- Basketball
- Football
- Wrestling
- Cross Country

Girls

- Basketball
- Volleyball
- Softball
- Cross Country

According to PIAA directory July 2016

== Notable alumni ==
- Ralph Cindrich, former NFL Linebacker of the New England Patriots (1972), and Houston Oilers (1973–1975).
- Bobby Schubenski, owner and founder of BlackCraft Cult and BlackCraft Whiskey.
