= George Meredith (Tasmanian settler) =

Tasmanian settler

George Meredith (13 February 1777 – 1856) was the head of the Meredith family who, with the Amos family, were the first white settlers on the east coast of Tasmania. Meredith arrived in Hobart in 1821 and farmed near Swansea. He also had whaling stations in the area. Meredith's daughter Clara married Richard Dry, Tasmanian Premier and the first Australian to receive a knighthood. Meredith's son was the politician, Charles Meredith and Charles' wife was the artist and author, Louisa Anne Meredith. Meredith's grandson, Duncan Boyes won the Victoria Cross at Shimonoseki, Japan in 1865. A memorial to George Meredith can be found in All Saints churchyard, Swansea.
