= Hagley, Tasmania =

Towns in Tasmania

Hagley
- Town
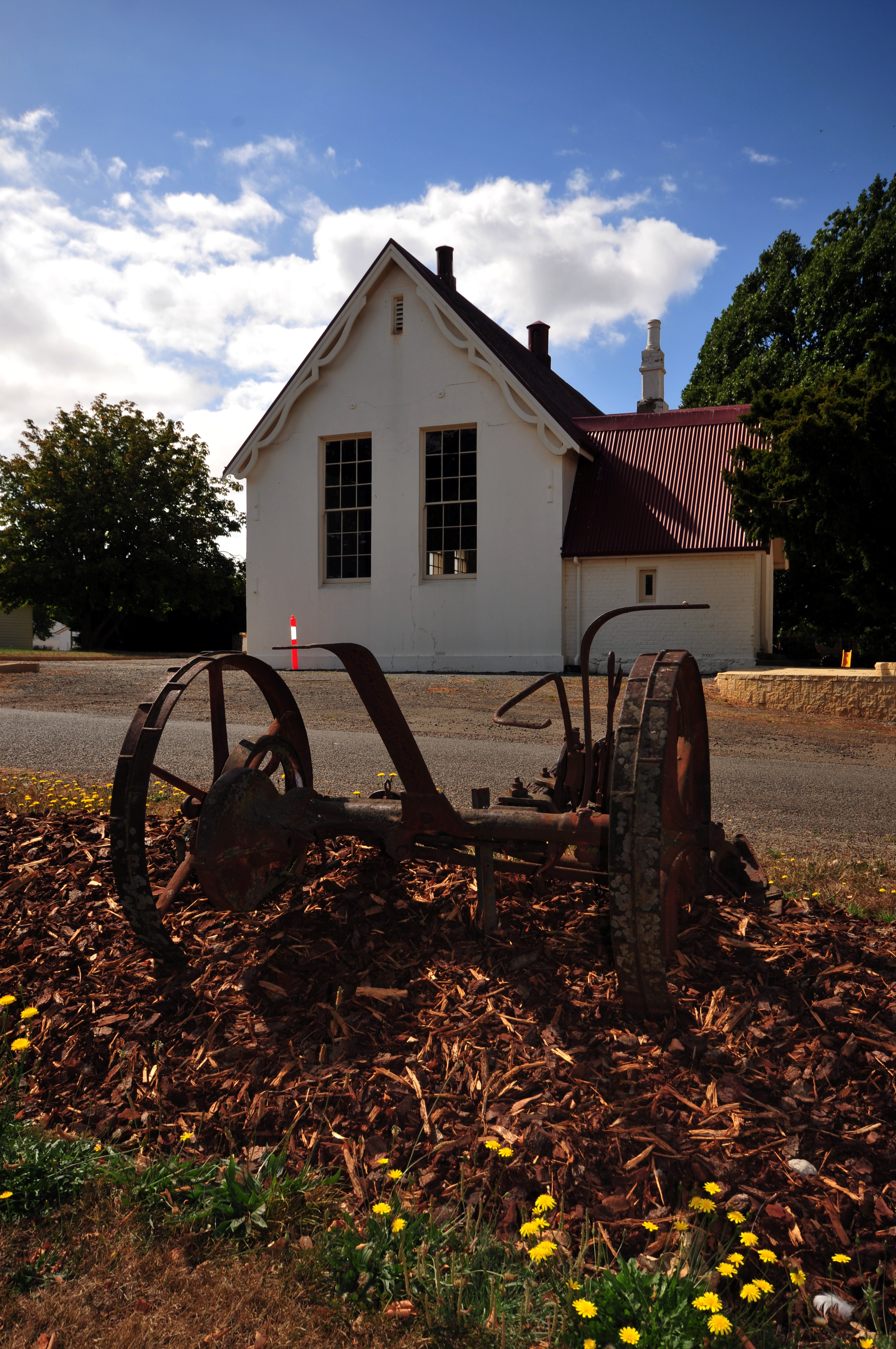
- Hagley Farm School's original 1865 building

- Coordinates: 41°31′34″S 146°53′04″E
- Country: Australia
- State: Tasmania
- Region: Launceston
- LGA: Meander Valley Council
- Location: 22 km (14 mi) SW of Launceston; 5 km (3.1 mi) NE of Westbury
- Established: 1866

Government
  - State electorate: Lyons
  - Federal division: Lyons
- Elevation: 150 m (490 ft)

Population
  - Total: 335 (2016 census)
- Postcode: 7292
- Mean max temp: 16.9 °C (62.4 °F)
- Mean min temp: 4.6 °C (40.3 °F)
- Annual rainfall: 834.5 mm (32.85 in)
Localities around Hagley
Westbury, Quamby Bend	Selbourne	Westwood
Westbury	Hagley	Carrick
Westbury	Cluan, Whitemore	Whitemore

Hagley is a rural locality and town in the local government area of Meander Valley in the Launceston region of Tasmania. The locality is about 5 kilometres (3.1 mi) north-east of the town of Westbury. The 2016 census recorded a population of 335 for the state suburb of Hagley.

The area was used by the Port Dalrymple—an early name for George Town in Northern Tasmania—Aboriginal Tasmanians until they were driven from their lands by European settlement. Land grants from the 1820s, to William Thomas Lyttleton, William Bryan and Sir Richard Dry, led to the first buildings, and later gazetting of the town in April 1866. Lyttleton was associated with Hagley Hall in England; his naming of his estate led to the town's name, and he is believed to have bequeathed the town's land. Hagley is an agricultural centre sited on largely alluvial soil near the Meander River. As of 2011, the town had a population of 330, most of whom were Australian born. Hagley is remembered as the first site of coursing in Tasmania, which started at Quamby Estate in 1878. The town has had cricket and Australian rules football teams, but it no longer fields teams.

There are four church buildings in Hagley. A Presbyterian church opened in 1879; it is now closed and in private hands. The Uniting Church building is a Modernist design built in 1957; it sits next to a wooden Methodist chapel built in 1859. St Mary's Anglican Church is a bluestone Gothic Revival building that opened for services in 1862. The lands and a significant part of the church's funds were donated by Sir Richard Dry. Dry is buried at the church and the church's tower is dedicated to his wife. Hagley Farm Primary School is the oldest agricultural school in Australia. It began as the Hagley State School in 1865 and became an area school for the surrounding districts in 1936. The school has a 64-hectare (160-acre) farm and agriculture features strongly in its curriculum.

The town has some 19th-century buildings listed on both the Register of the National Estate and the Tasmanian Heritage Register. Hagley Mill is noted as possibly the only extant mill in Australia that was horse-driven. Quamby Estate, the former estate of Sir Richard Dry, is run as a tourist attraction and has a 9-hole golf course. Hagley's reticulated water supply is sourced from a filtration and treatment plant at nearby Westbury. This plant opened in 2013; from 1902 until then the town had received untreated water. From 1871 the town was serviced by passenger rail, but this ceased prior to 1978. Hagley was originally on the main road from Launceston to Deloraine, but was bypassed in 2001 when the Hagley section of the Bass Highway was completed.

== History ==
Prior to the European settlement of what was then Van Diemen's Land, the Hagley area was a camping ground for the Port Dalrymple Aboriginal tribe, the area's native people; Port Dalrymple was an early name for George Town. It is uncertain if this tribe was a separate group from the aborigines near Port Sorell and the Mersey River. The Port Dalrymple tribe ventured as far as Westbury, but mainly lived and hunted nearer the Tamar River, and stone implements have been found in the Hagley area. Encounters with the natives and reports of Europeans shooting them feature in the area's history and mythology. Stephen Dry, cousin to Sir Richard Dry, was reportedly speared by an Aboriginal on a hill near Hagley. On a property formerly known as Strath is a water hole named "No, No's Hole". There is a legend that

... a mob of blacks who had committed a murder on the property sought refuge there when an avenging party of whites were on their heels. They cried 'No, No,' and kept diving under the water for safety, but were all shot.

— Karl Stieglitz, Stieglitz (1946)

By 1830, aborigines were no longer seen in the area; they had been driven from their traditional areas by the new settlers. In October that year detachments of "The Black Line" reached nearby Westbury. This was an effort to clear Van Diemen's land of the last of the natives.

William Thomas Lyttleton, William Bryan and Sir Richard Dry were all important figures in the early days of the town. These three owned most of the land of what is now the town and district of Hagley during the 1820s.

Sir Richard Dry's father came to Tasmania as an "Irish Exile" with Lt Governor Colonel William Patterson, founder of Launceston. He spent 13 years as Government Storekeeper at Port Dalrymple. As recognition of his work, on retirement in 1819 he was granted 500 acres (200 ha) of land. Governor Lachlan Macquarie granted him the land that marked the foundation of settlement at Hagley. When the elder Dry died, Sir Richard inherited this and other lands in Tasmania totaling over 30,000 acres (120 km^{2}). Quamby Estate, a property owned by Sir Richard until his death, is east of the town. Quamby is supposedly an Aboriginal word - although its meaning is not certain. William Thomas Lyttleton was born in 1786 in England; he was a distant connection to those owning Hagley Hall in Worcestershire, England. He spent some years in the army, moving to Van Diemen's Land in 1822 with his family, after he retired. He was initially granted 560 acres (230 ha) near Westbury, adjacent the land owned by Richard Dry, and 800 near Meander. He called the grant near Westbury 'Hagley', in honour of the Town, Parish or Hall in England. Lyttleton built a homestead on the Hagley property in 1829, though most or all of this original building has been since demolished. He lived in the Hagley area for 14 years, before returning to England. William Bryan, builder of the first flour mill at Carrick, was granted 1,077 acres (436 ha) at Hagley in March 1825. Bryan also had holdings in Carrick and Whitemore totaling 11,000 acres (4,500 ha).

Lyttleton died in England in 1839. In disposing his estate, the estate's trustee put all of the lands up for sale. Lyttleton is believed to have bequeathed the village area to the Hagley residents. The block of land containing the Lyttleton homestead was sold in 1843 to a Dr James Richardson, and the remainder of the land was sold to others in 1848.

The first building in the town was a brick church built on the side of the road from Launceston to Westbury. This road was known as the "Westbury Road", now called the Meander Valley Highway. The church was built for Church of England services and opened in 1848. It was built at the behest of Sir Richard Dry and Archdeacon R. R. Davies, the latter trustee of the Lyttleton estate, on part of the former estate. The land was a gift to the Church of England by Davies in his capacity as a trustee. By 1849, the town's buildings were the Hagley Church of England, an inn—built and run by the East Family opposite the church—and three paling-clad cottages occupied by separate families. At this time the Westbury Road was often a muddy quagmire and land, especially near Quamby bend, that is now cleared was dense forest. The Hagley Inn was opened c.1850, it was first called "The Country Inn", by James East, who had run the earlier inn in Hagley. Over time the inn has been extensively altered and it closed as a hotel in the late 1980s. In 1850 Hagley's buildings comprised

... the church, the Hagley Inn, a blacksmith's shop, a cottage occupied by Mr. Fryett, and one occupied by F.J.Flight, who died recently at Forth; also one built, I think, by a Mr. Lyons.

— J. A. Breaden

Hagley's population increased significantly during the 1850s as people moved both to the village, and to farming properties in the district. A doctor was practicing in the area by 1854, and in 1855 a school opened in the Church of England; paid for with funds raised by local residents. That year a postal service began in Hagley. David Parry was appointed postmaster on 1 July 1855, probably operating an unofficial post office from the Hagley Inn. A post office officially opened on 10 June 1865, in a building that was demolished in 1970. This building also had a store called the "six day store" run by the postmaster and his wife. The town gained a second hotel in 1857 with Carmody's Meander Hotel, though this remained open for only a few years. In 1857 also the town's first community organisation was formed, the Hagley Ploughing Association, and regular ploughing matches began. A second church was built, a Methodist Chapel on the Westbury road, in 1859.

Mrs Bryan and her husband were concerned about the lack of education in the area. In the early 1860s they provided two acres of land at nearby Glenore, (Note: The Glenore School was a few miles south of Hagley rather than in the town itself) and built a brick school and school house. The Glenore school was finished in 1862, and it was accompanied by a 260-acre (110 ha) farm whose rent was to pay for a teacher and building upkeep. A new church, for the Church of England, was built just outside Hagley. St Mary's Church of Hagley and Quamby was completed and opened in 1862. The first church continued in use as a school until 1865. In the prior year construction had begun on a public school, a two-room building with an adjacent 8-room teacher's residence; the school opened in 1865. Hagley was gazetted as a town in April 1866. By that time it had a number of stores, a blacksmith, a boot maker, a saddler, a wheelwright, two churches, two schools, two hotels, a resident seamstress and a midwife. By the late 1870s the town had gained, in addition to houses, a police station, gaol, engineering works, one steam mill run by the Noake Family and another at nearby Quamby. A rail line opened, from Launceston to Westbury, in 1871, though its station was 2 miles (3.2 km) from Hagley. In the 1880s a siding was added at Hoggs Lane, and a passenger platform at the siding in 1910. Using the new rail line, by the 1880s the post office was receiving four deliveries each weekday and two on Saturday.

Electricity reached Hagley in 1928, supplied by the Tasmanian Hydro-Electric Commission. Prior to this—the year is unknown—there was some street lighting in the form of four dim Kerosine lamps set on 10-foot (3 m) posts. These lights were manually lit and extinguished daily. In 1941 the Hagley Flax Mill began operating to process locally grown flax. This mill was on the Meander River's bank, three miles from the centre of Hagley.

Hagley was gazetted as a locality in 1968.

== Geography and demographics ==
Hagley sits on mostly flat land near the Meander River at an elevation of 150 metres (490 ft) above sea level. The land formation is largely alluvial with Lateritic podzolic soils, classified as dermosol under the Australian Soil Classification system. These soils date from the Tertiary Period, with some from the more recent Quaternary. Hagley was founded, and remains, an agricultural centre. Dairy and pea-farming prior to World War II have given way to poppies as the principal crop. These poppies are opium poppies grown for Tasmanian Alkaloids, in nearby Westbury. The Meander River forms the northern boundary.

In the first Australian census in 1911 there were 611 people resident in the town and surrounding area. By 1931 this had reduced to 246, of which 186 lived in the town. In the 2011 census 330 people were recorded living in 148 dwellings in the Hagley statistical area. The census did not record the town's population but the Meander Valley Council notes it as c.150 in 2014. Hagley's people are predominantly Australian born with 89.1% reporting as such in the 2011 census. This contrasts with 83.6% for Tasmania and 69.8% for the whole of Australia.

The town is in the Meander Valley Council local government area, the state legislative council Electoral division of Western Tiers, and the Division of Lyons for both the state and federal houses of representatives.

== Road infrastructure ==
The Bass Highway (National Route 1) enters from the east and runs through to the west, where it exits. Route B54 (Meander Valley Road) also passes through from east to west, crossing over the Bass Highway near the western boundary. Route C507 (Hagley Station Lane) starts at an intersection with B54 and runs south, crossing over the Bass Highway, until it exits. Route C732 (Westwood Road) starts at an intersection with B54 and runs north-east until it exits. Route C735 (Selbourne Road) starts at an intersection with B54 and runs north until it exits.

=== Climate ===
Climate data for Westbury (Valley View)
Month	Jan	Feb	Mar	Apr	May	Jun	Jul	Aug	Sep	Oct	Nov	Dec	Year
Mean daily maximum °C (°F)	23.4 (74.1)	23.4 (74.1)	21.0 (69.8)	17.1 (62.8)	13.8 (56.8)	10.0 (50.0)	9.7 (49.5)	11.9 (53.4)	14.5 (58.1)	16.9 (62.4)	19.4 (66.9)	21.8 (71.2)	16.9 (62.4)
Mean daily minimum °C (°F)	8.2 (46.8)	8.5 (47.3)	7.2 (45.0)	4.7 (40.5)	2.4 (36.3)	1.0 (33.8)	0.6 (33.1)	1.7 (35.1)	3.0 (37.4)	4.4 (39.9)	5.8 (42.4)	7.5 (45.5)	4.6 (40.3)
Average rainfall mm (inches)	45.2 (1.78)	46.7 (1.84)	47.7 (1.88)	64.3 (2.53)	76.6 (3.02)	85.7 (3.37)	102.1 (4.02)	97.2 (3.83)	81.1 (3.19)	74.0 (2.91)	58.2 (2.29)	55.7 (2.19)	834.5 (32.85)
Average rainy days (≥ 0.2 mm)	4.2	3.7	4.3	5.4	6.7	7.4	8.9	9.3	8.1	7.4	6.0	5.4	76.8
Source: Bureau of Meteorology

== Sports ==
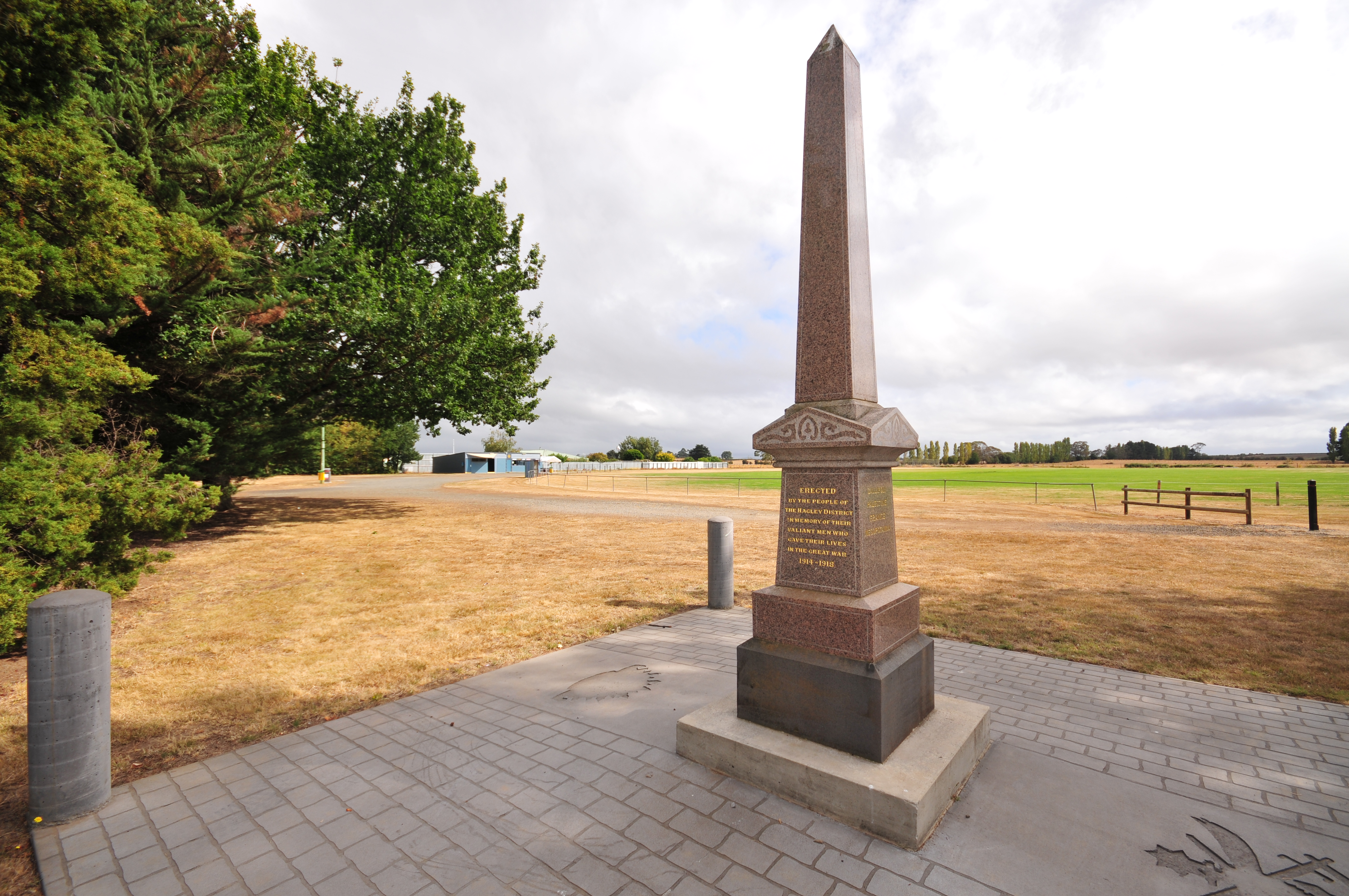
Hagley's war memorial, and recreation park

The sport of coursing began in Tasmania at Hagley, an event was held 6–7 June 1878 at Quamby. For this first event 500 people, including the Governor of Tasmania, came from Launceston. Tasmanian Government Railways ran an excursion train service from Launceston for the event. A coursing competition called the "Waterloo Cup" has a long history in the town. (Note: The Waterloo cup is mentioned in newspapers including: Burnie Advocate, p.2, 14 June 1943; The Age p.4, 23 June 1936; Launceston Examiner, p.9, 8 June 1951; Otago Witness, p.21, Issue 1641, 5 May 1883)

Hagley's recreation ground opened on the main road in 1902; until then local paddocks were used. An Australian rules football club was formed in Hagley c.1895. Matches were played on a private paddock until 1902 when they moved to the recreation ground. The club's most successful period was, as part of the Esk Association, when they won five successive premierships from 1949 to 1953. The club closed in 1998, as part of a general decline of country football in Tasmania. During the club's 102 years, the most widely known player was former St Kilda player Matthew Young.

Hagley's cricket team was formed in the 1890s and was playing by 1896. Similarly to the football club they played on a paddock, adjacent to the current recreation ground, moving to the new ground in 1902. The ground remains open for cricket though Hagley no longer fields a team.

== Water supply ==
In 1898 the Westbury and Hagley Water Act was passed, providing for construction of a reticulated water scheme using water from the Meander River and other streams. Hagley was connected to mains water via the Westbury-Hagley water scheme in 1902. By 1923 residents of Hagley were asking for an upgrade of the system, as it was seen as inadequate by then. The Westbury Council took out loans in 1952 to extend the system, and work on this extension continued into 1954, still connected to Westbury although with larger diameter pipes.

For over a century the water was supplied untreated. In the 1980s a dam at Westbury allowed selective pumping from the river and some improvement in water quality. As Hagley's water was not fully treated, from time to time contamination required boil-water notices. Sedimentation damaged hot-water cylinders and restricted supply due to the deposits left in the water delivery system. Work began in 2012 on a $5.5 million water treatment work at Westbury to supply Westbury, Hagley and Exton. This water treatment plant was opened by Ben Lomond Water in June 2013, supplying filtered and treated water to Hagley.

== Religion and churches ==
=== Presbyterian ===
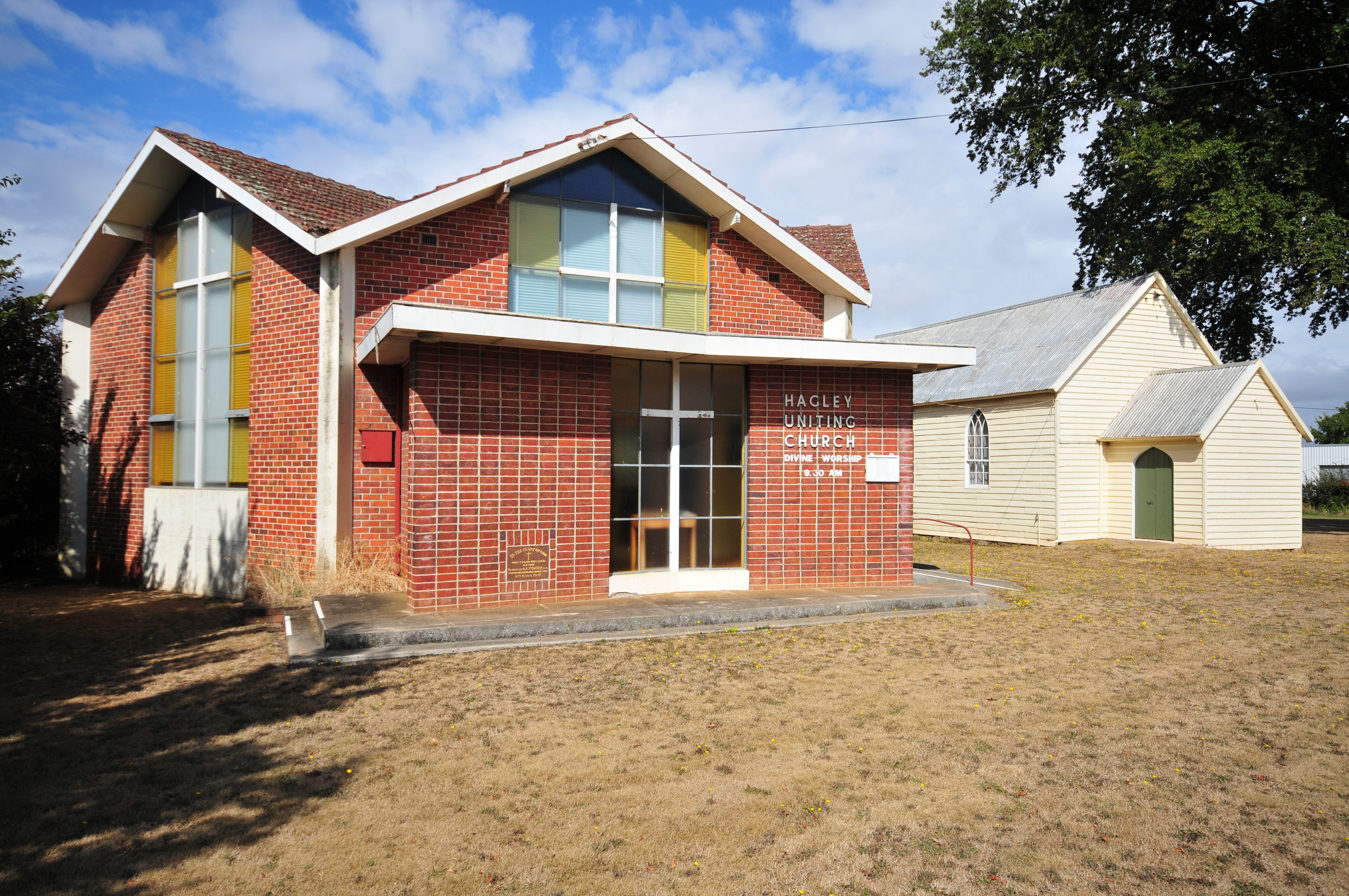
Hagley Uniting Church (front) and original Methodist Chapel (rear)

There was a Presbyterian visiting preacher in Hagley, from Deloraine, Tasmania, from 1854. Services were held at this time in the Methodist Chapel. Regular Presbyterian services were being held by 1855, most likely in the original Church of England building. In the late 1870s, the old Church of England was purchased, along with the associated land, by the Presbyterian church for 265 pounds. The building was demolished in 1878 and construction of a new church was begun almost on the same site. During demolition and construction, Presbyterian services were again held at the Methodist chapel. The foundation stone was laid 18 March 1879 by which time the walls were already nearly complete. Cement rendering has hidden the stone and its location is uncertain. Hagley Presbyterian Church's first services were held on 14 December 1879. A manse was built nearby in 1884.

The church used bricks from a demolished brewery, possibly in Longford, and it was completed at a cost of approximately 950 pounds. The building was designed by Harry Conway, a Launceston architect. It is a largely brick building with freestone corbels and copings, and is of a Gothic Revival architectural style. The church is 40 by 25 feet (12.2 by 7.6 m) with a 12-by-10-foot (3.7 by 3.0 m) vestry, and was intended to seat 250 people. By 1973 the Presbyterian congregation at Hagley was very small and there was cause for concern about its future. The Presbyterian church building is still in the town, opposite the original Hagley hotel, but is now privately owned and no longer used for worship.

=== Methodist and Uniting Church ===
Hagley has a Uniting Church, built in 1957, adjacent to the original Methodist Chapel which dates from 1859. Early Wesleyan (Methodist) services were held in the 1840s in a farmhouse in Hoggs Lane. Local Methodists began raising funds for a church in the late 1850s. Land was donated by a George Scott and, at a cost of 370 pounds, a 40-by-22-foot (12.2 by 6.7 m) wooden chapel and two-roomed caretaker's cottage were built. This Methodist chapel opened for services on 27 March 1859. What is now Hagley Uniting Church was built next to the old Methodist church in 1957. This newer building is of a Modernist design with coloured glass and geometric architectural shapes. The Uniting Church site was listed on the Tasmanian Heritage Register in June 2009.

The church held its final service 31 January 2016. Low attendance and high maintenance costs were cited as reasons for its closure.

=== Church of England (Anglican) ===
Hagley's first building was a brick church, on "Westbury Road" for Church of England services. The foundation stone was laid 8 January 1847 and the church completed, using materials from Deloraine, and opened 9 June 1848. It was built on part of the former Lyttleton Estate, funded by Sir Richard Dry and the estate's trustee, Archdeacon R.R. Davies. When completed the church was in the Parish of Westbury. By 1859, with population growing, parishioners in Hagley held a meeting to consider forming their own Parish. Dry offered to pay the Minister's stipend and provide 1000 pounds towards church buildings. Consequent to this offer, the separate Parish of Hagley and Quamby was created. This first church was used until completion of the later St Mary's Church. It was later demolished to make way for a Presbyterian Church.

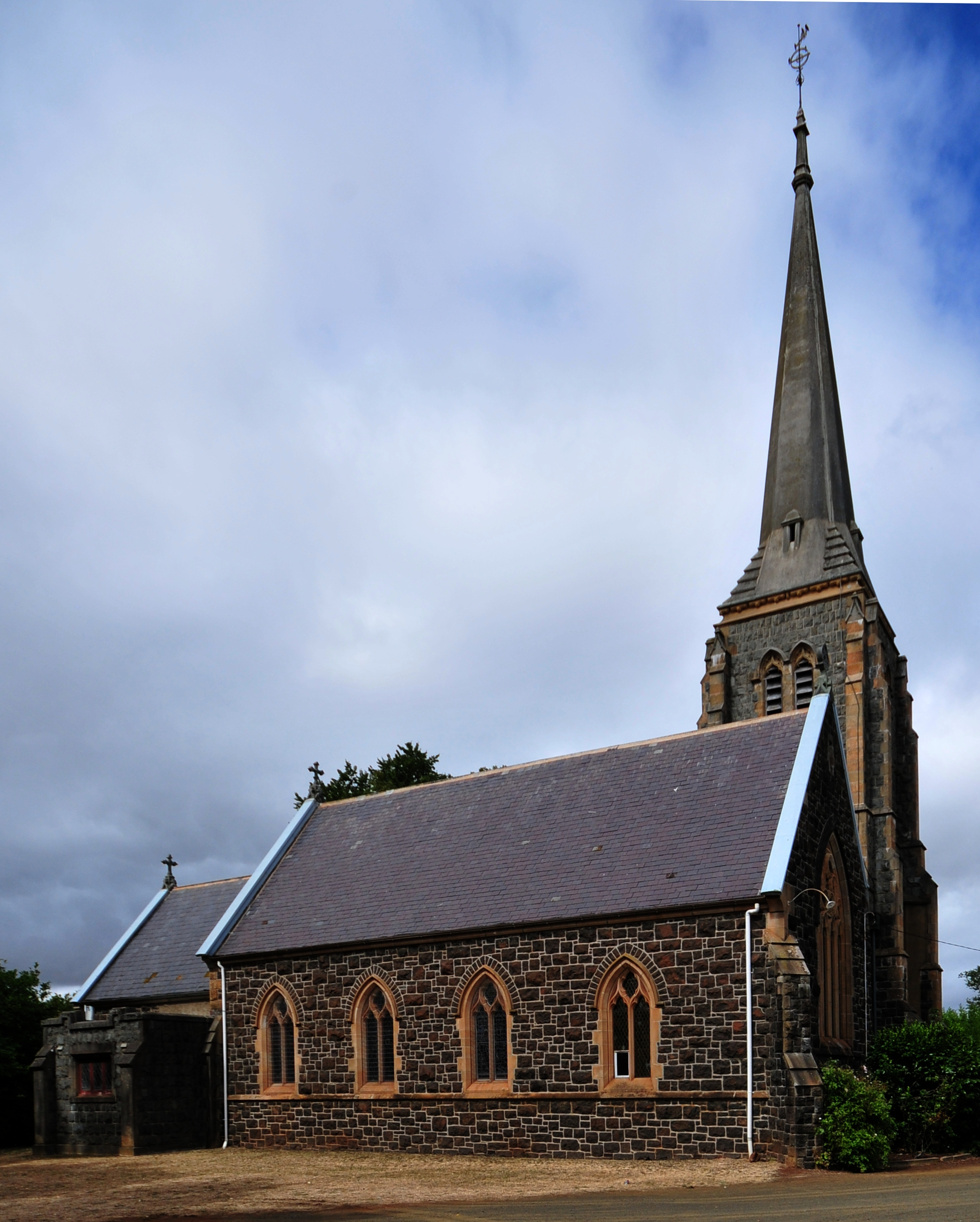
St Mary's Church (1862)

The Church of England's parish of Hagley had its beginnings in 1856 when Dry endowed it with three farms. Between them these farms brought in 400 pounds rental income per year. While in England, on a trip taken for his health, Dry commissioned architect Richard Cromwell Carpenter to draw plans for a new church. The plans were modified by Carpenter's agent in Hobart, Henry Hunter. On returning to Tasmania, Dry donated 13 acres (5.3 ha) of land for the church. Hunter was also responsible for designing churches at Westbury, Deloraine, Colebrook, Tasmania and the Church of the Apostles in Launceston. Dry funded construction of the rectory and funded a significant part of the church's construction. Some other funding came from the sale of the original church and land. As first built it only had a nave and aisle.

The brick rectory was completed in 1861, before construction of the church began. St Mary's foundation stone was laid 10 December 1861, in a ceremony attended by Dry and Bishop Francis Nixon, the first Bishop of Tasmania. The church's structure used local bluestone for the walls, freestone from Bellerive for pillars, arches and mullions, and roof slates from Great Britain. St Mary's is built in a Gothic Revival architectural style. It was completed and opened in a ceremony on 26 November 1862. Dry had asked to be buried at St Mary's. After his death in 1869 a memorial at the church was proposed. The memorial chosen was a chancel, which the original church lacked. Funds were raised by a Government backed appeal, including a donation from Prince Alfred, Duke of Edinburgh. The chancel was started in 1871, using bluestone from the same quarry as the church, and was finished in August of the same year. To this point the church was seen as incomplete and had not been consecrated. After completion of the chancel St Mary's was consecrated, by the Bishop of Tasmania Charles Henry Bromby on 24 August 1871. A tower, spire and vestry were added in 1932, after work began the prior year. The building work was funded by a bequest from Lady Dry and a Miss Jane Patterson, a St Mary's churchgoer. The tower is dedicated to Lady Dry and the spire and vestry to Miss Patterson. The spire was designed by H S East, who also restored St Andrew's church at Westbury. The additions were consecrated 6 December 1932.

St Mary's church houses recreations of two significant artworks, both donated in 1857 by Lady Clara Dry. The first is a recreation of Guido Reni's 1610 altarpiece from the Quirinal Palace, Rome. The second a 19th-century copy of Raphael's Transfiguration. Both were purchased in Italy during the Dry's honeymoon, and were restored in 2004. It also contains a copy of Bartolomé Esteban Murillo's Crucifixion in the East window—a gift from Lady Dry— and a copy of Raphael's Annunciation. The Nave houses an organ built in 1861 by J. W. Walker & Sons Ltd of London. The organ is essentially original, with only the addition of electric blowing, and includes one manual and seven speaking stops.

== Education ==
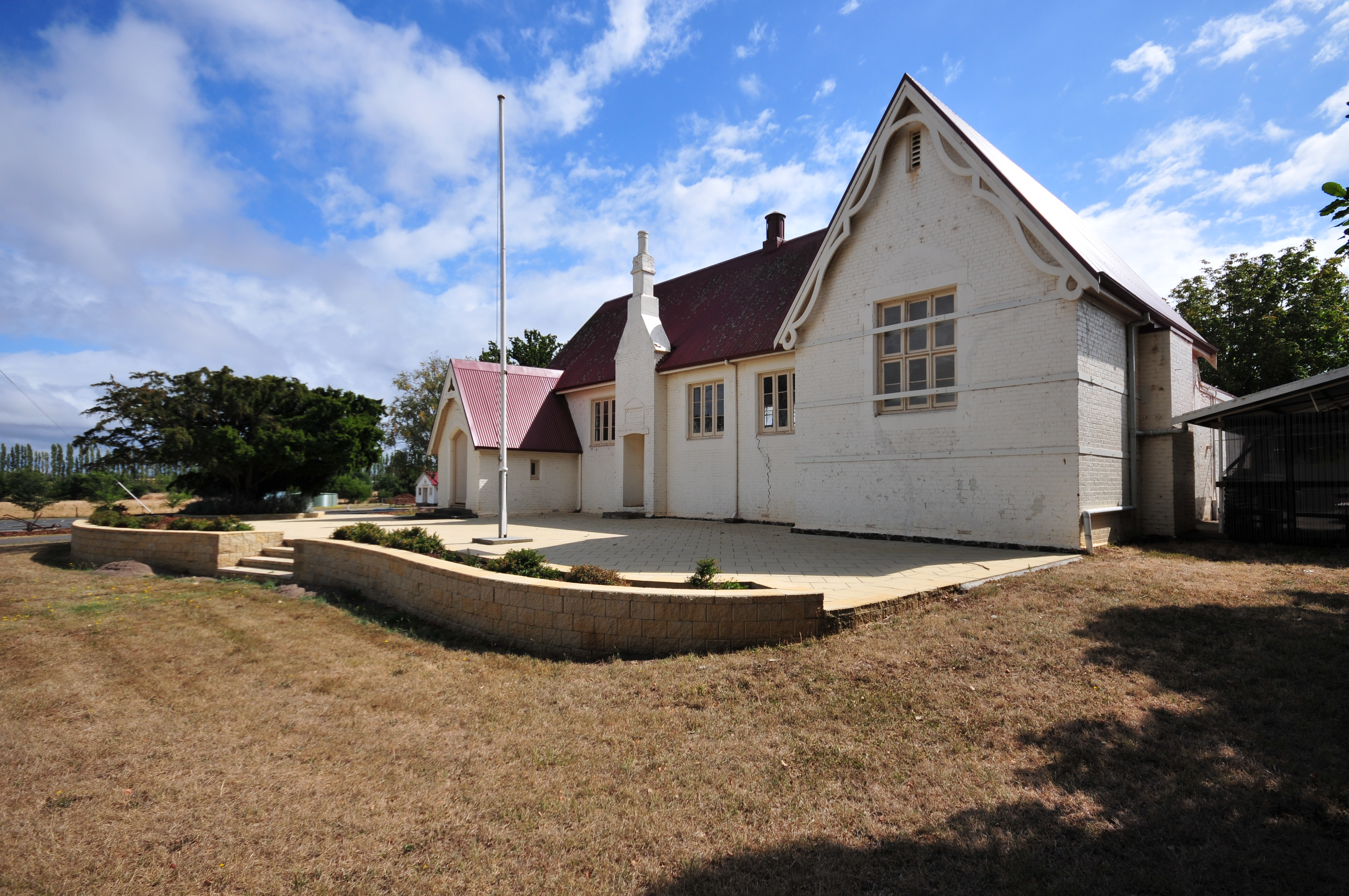
The original 1865 building of Hagley Farm Primary School

Early education in Hagley was by private tutors. In 1855 a school opened in the Church of England building, taking in both borders and day scholars. Schooling had to sometimes be interrupted as the building was used during school hours for marriages, and religious services.

William Bryan and his wife donated land and built a school at nearby Glenore in 1862. The Bryans left a bequest that fully funded the school until 1914, when the state's education department assumed responsibility for the building and the teacher's salary. By 1921 (Note: Scott, p.26 lists this date incorrectly as 1821 rather than 1921) 56 students were attending. The building had been condemned by 1926 and a new brick school building was built a short distance away. Following a direction by Mrs Bryan in her bequest, the school was used at times for religious services, by Methodists and Anglicans. Due to low attendance the school was closed in 1941 and the few remaining pupils continued schooling at Whitemore.

Hagley has a single school, Hagley Farm Primary School. It teaches reception to year 6 for, as of 2014, 420 students. The school has a 64-hectare (160-acre) commercial farm attached. The farm is varied with cattle, sheep and crops. The school is the oldest that is specifically dedicated to agricultural education in Australia.

The original school building was built in 1865, on 2 acres (0.81 ha) of land just east of the town donated by Sir Richard Dry. This first building is of Gothic Revival form. Its structure and interior are largely intact and original. A decision was made in the 1930s to make Hagley an area school. As of 1935, there were five single-teacher schools in the local area. All of these were closed and Hagley opened as the "Hagley Area School" on 30 January 1936. Its curriculum was much expanded from prior years' and included classes on nutrition, construction, agriculture, housewifery, cooking, carpentry and dressmaking; these classes were segregated into traditional gender roles. Students from the closed schools were brought to Hagley by bus. At this point most rural schools stopped education at grade 7 but from 1937 Hagley was extended to teach grade 8. In the late 1930s the school served Hagley, Carrick, Hadspen, Rosevale and these town's surrounding farms, using two buses to transport students. Hagley and Sheffield were the first two area schools in Tasmania.

A residential side to the school was planned in 1939. Buildings would be added and agricultural work expanded with a full sized farm. The start of World War II caused the building plans to be cancelled though they were soon reinstated, and in 1941 building work began. The reversal was spurred by the desire to accommodate victims of The Blitz, though this particular use never eventuated. The school became residential, for boys, and its farm was extended to 200 acres (81 ha). The first borders were the sons of servicemen. With the extension of the land—the government had purchased 190 acres (77 ha) around the school—the school widened its activities and became known as the Hagley Farm School. Students, as part of their education, built many of the farm's buildings during the war. J Maslin had been principle since 1931. In 1944 while explaining the schools philosophy he stated

We give an acre for a cow or sheep willingly, while we shut our children and our chickens up in too limited spaces, and they suffer in consequence. Schools of the future must be provided with estates where the children will be surrounded with many natural and beautiful things.

Part of the practical work was growing food for the school. In 1944 the daily two-course dinner, for staff and over 90 students, was mostly the school's farm's produce. After the war, from c.1948–55, the school received child migrants from Belgium, Greece and the United Kingdom. The school was known as Hagley State School until 1936, Hagley Farm School until 1976 and Hagley Farm Primary School since.

== Transport ==
A rail line near Hagley was first surveyed in 1856, as part of a route from Launceston to Deloraine. A decade later a Railway Act was passed, strongly supported by then Premier of Tasmania Sir Richard Dry. A private company, the Launceston and Western Railway Company, was formed to build the route and the first sod turned in January 1868 by Prince Alfred, Duke of Edinburgh. The rail line passed 0.5 miles (0.8 km) south of the town and a station was built 2 miles (3 km) distant. The line opened, and the first train passed near Hagley, on 10 February 1871. The rail line carried passengers, and several daily mail deliveries. Launceston and Western Railway soon ran into financial problems, the line closed 29 June 1872 and the company itself went bankrupt on 25 July. The government took over the railway, as the Tasmanian Government Railways, on 31 October 1873. Local farmers petitioned for an additional line to properties in Hagley's west. Construction began on the new line in 1887 and a siding as built at the intersection of Hoggs Lane. This siding was used first for farm produce, later facilities for loading stock were added. A platform and waiting room were added in 1910, though it was some years before passenger trains stopped at Hoggs Lane. The passenger rail service had stopped before 1978, a time when all Tasmanian passenger rail services ceased.

The road through Hagley, now called the Meander Valley Highway, was originally the main road west from Launceston. Beginning in the 1990s work began on a replacement highway that would bypass all the towns between Prospect and Deloraine, including Hagley. As the road was part of the National Highway this work was funded by the federal government. The federal transport department announced, in 1999, that they were to spend $36 million bypassing Hagley and Westbury with the new Bass Highway. A this time 7600 vehicles per day were driving through Hagley, the bypass was expected to more than halve this. The new highway passed by the historic Hagley Mill site and so, as part of the construction, the federal government funded pre- and post-construction preservation work on the Mill site. Local residents were concerned about the impact on Hagley of the reduction in through traffic and the Westbury-Hagley Development Committee was investigating. The town's centre was finally bypassed when the Bass Highway's Westbury-Hagley bypass was opened on 13 December 2001.

As of 2014 the only public transport in Hagley is school buses, operated by the private Westbus and Redline Coaches companies.

== Historic buildings ==
Hagley retains 19th century buildings, some are listed on the now closed Register of the National Estate, (Note: A searchable index of the Register of the National Estate was, as of 19 April 2014, accessible on the Department of the Environment website) some also on the Tasmanian Heritage Register.

Hagley house is a brick and stucco, two-storey Georgian era house 1.5 kilometres (0.93 mi) from the town's centre. Construction was begun by William Lyttleton prior to 1848, at which time it was noted as incomplete, and completed, after Lyttleton's death, by Dr Richardson.

Hagley mill is a historic site, 1 kilometre (0.6 mi) south of Hagley's centre, on part of the former Hagley Estate. The mill and land are owned by the Department of Transport; they were acquired as part of the construction of Bass Highway. The site's significance is that it is possibly the only extant mill in Australia that was horse-driven, and almost certainly the only example in Tasmania. The mill and associated buildings date from 1830 to 1840. The mill appears to have been converted c.1870 to fit a mobile steam mill. Its wheel house has original ironstone foundations and brick walls forming an octagonal building, a design peculiarity to accommodate the horses and driving mechanism. The site has a barn, one-room cottage and dairy that all date from the mill's construction.

Quamby house was built for Sir Richard Dry in 1838, probably to a design by Richard Cromwell Carpenter. It was built mostly by convict labour, using locally made clay bricks, in an American Colonial style, a single storey with a stone-flagged long veranda. The original estate was broken up in the second half of the 19th century. Quamby was opened for tourism, by Tasmanian Premier David Bartlett on 4 October 2009. It is operated as the Quamby Golf and Country Club, and has a par 38 9-hole golf course that dates from the early 1990s.

== Bibliography ==
- Barrett, W R (1942). History of the Church of England in Tasmania. Hobart: Mercury Press.
- Cooper G, Goss G (compilers) (1996). Tasmanian Railways 1871–1996; 125 years. Devonport: CG publishing Co. ISBN 0-646-27633-6.
- Department of Premier and Cabinet (24 July 2003). Partnership agreement between Government of Tasmania and Meander Valley Council (PDF). Archived from the original (PDF) on 6 April 2015.
- Evans, Kathryn; Terry, Ian (October 2004). Meander Valley Heritage Study, Stage 1: Thematic History. Meander Valley Council.
- Maslin, T. S. (1948). Hagley (The story of a Tasmanian area school). Melbourne: Georgian House.
- Miller R J, ed. (1973). Presbyterian Church of Tasmania (triple jubilee 1973). Hobart: Presbytery of Tasmania.
- Scott, E.G. (1985). Hagley (A Short history of the early days of the Village and district with notes on the pioneer families). Launceston: Birchalls. ISBN 0-949457-05-1.
- Stephens, Geoffrey (1991). The Anglican Church in Tasmania (A diocesan history to mark the sesquicentenary). Hobart: Trustees of the Diocese. ISBN 0-646-06813-X.
- von Stieglitz, K.R. (1946). Then and now in old Westbury (with notes on Exton, Hagley and Carrick). Launceston: Telegraph Printery.
- Watson, Reg A (1976). Churches of Van Diemen's Land. Hobart: OBM Publishing. ISBN 0-9599034-3-7.
