= Brett Godfrey =

Australian businessman

Brett Godfrey (born 8 August 1963) is an Australian businessman and co-founder of Virgin Australia. Godfrey was awarded the Centenary Medal for his service to Tourism and Aviation in 2003 and inducted into the HM Awards' ‘Hall of Fame' in 2015.

== Career ==
Godfrey was educated in Melbourne, before qualifying as a Chartered Accountant with Touche Ross in 1987. Godfrey worked for the firm's Canadian arm before returning to Australia in 1989 and joining Sherrard/National Jet in Melbourne as its Financial Controller.

Godfrey's Virgin career began in the early 1990s when he moved to the UK to join airline Virgin Atlantic as Finance Manager. In 1996, Godfrey became chief financial officer and represented Virgin's interests in the acquisition of a new European low cost airline – Virgin Express. In 1999, Godfrey joined with Richard Branson announcing plans of Australia's newest airline, Virgin Blue.

“In the case of Virgin Blue, we backed the plans of a former Virgin Express executive and entrepreneur Brett Godfrey, who first presented his ideas to me sketched out on a beer mat." Sir Richard Branson

In 2003 Virgin Blue Airlines debuted on the Australian Securities Exchange and turned a $10m investment into a $2.3B listed company and by the end of Godfrey's tenure Virgin Blue had made $700M in accumulated profits.

Godfrey retired as CEO of Virgin Blue in 2010.

== Virgin Australia ==
Brett Godfrey is co-founder and was founding CEO of Virgin Australia Holdings, launching the airline with just UD$10M in seed capital and 2 jets. He greatly expanded the airline, introducing low fare flights and creating partnerships with other airlines, often taking advantage of downturns in the airline industry.

Godfrey's 10-year period as CEO saw the airline expand to an operation of 86 aircraft, 6,500 staff and an Airline Group incorporating Virgin Blue and international subsidiaries Pacific Blue, Polynesian Blue and V Australia. Godfrey was credited with developing the "New World Carrier" strategy that initiated Virgin's move up-market and Virgin Blue's renewal and growth 'Airline of the Future' project now known as Virgin Australia. Prior to his departure from the airline in 2010, Godfrey introduced Business Class on long haul operations and established partnerships with Delta Air Lines and Air New Zealand.

At Virgin Blue's annual results announcement 3 months before Godfrey's retirement, the airline reported a larger profit than the national carrier. It was the first time a rival Australian airline had greater profits than Qantas.

“The Virgin Blue that Brett Godfrey ran for ten years, finally broke the grip that established legacy airlines had on Australian aviation."

== Other business ventures ==
In 2001, Godfrey purchased Makepeace Island in partnership with Sir Richard Branson. The small heart shaped island resort is located in the Noosa River on Australia's Sunshine Coast. In 2011, Godfrey purchased Quamby Estate in Tasmania with former Virgin Blue Deputy CEO, Rob Sherrard. The estate is one of Tasmania's most historically important properties dating back to 1828 and now a commercial luxury lodge. In 2013, Godfrey continued his acquisition of tourism assets with the purchase of the Tasmanian Walking Company in partnership with Rob Sherrard. TWC owns a number of award-winning eco-tourism walks including Cradle Mountain Huts Walk along the World Heritage Area, Overland Track; Bay of Fires Lodge and Spa, Wineglass Bay Sail Walk and Three Capes Lodge Walk.

Godfrey launched the Australian Walking Company (AWC) in July 2015 with former Qantas CEO Geoff Dixon, Rob Sherrard and Greenstone Partner, Scott Malcolm. The acquisition of the Twelve Apostles Lodge Walk represents AWC's first guided walks investment. (10)

In 2019 Godfrey was appointed Chairman of the Tasmanian AFL Taskforce. It was a decade’s old-struggle and a five-year campaign. The Task Force that ran under Brett Godfrey produced a report that this would be the last time Tasmania would seriously put itself forward for 'recognition, for respect and not to be treated in the condescending manner of the past.' On the 3rd May 2023, AFL CEO Gillon McLachlan "praised Tasmania's patience, passion and perseverance after the League's 19th licence was officially granted to the state ahead of an expected entrance into the AFL in 2028".

== Directorships ==
Godfrey is Chairman of Tourism and Events Queensland, Chairman of the Tasmanian AFL Taskforce and a Director of Rugby Australia.

Previously, Godfrey was a Director of WestJet (2006 - 2019) and a Director of Auckland Airport (2010 - 2019).

== Awards ==
HM Awards 'Hall of Fame' Inductee Centenary Medal for service to Tourism and Aviation Australian Chief executive of the Year by the Institute of Customer Service Outstanding Chartered Accountant in Business, by the Institute of Chartered Accountants.
