= Scott Run (Cross Creek tributary) =

Stream in West Virginia, USA

Scott Run Tributary to Cross Creek
- Location of Scott Run mouth Scott Run (Cross Creek tributary) (the United States)

Location
- Country: United States
- States: West Virginia; Pennsylvania
- Counties: Brooke (WV); Washington (PA)

Physical characteristics
- Source: North Fork Cross Creek divide
  - location: about 1.5 miles southeast of Eldersville, Pennsylvania
  - coordinates: 40°20′51″N 080°28′36″W
  - elevation: 1,180 ft (360 m)
- Mouth: Cross Creek
  - location: Scott Run, West Virginia
  - coordinates: 40°17′54″N 080°32′03″W
  - elevation: 728 ft (222 m)
- Length: 5.40 mi (8.69 km)
- Basin size: 10.04 square miles (26.0 km^{2})
- Discharge
  - location: Cross Creek
  - average: 11.57 cu ft/s (0.328 m^{3}/s) at mouth with Cross Creek

Basin features
- Progression: Cross Creek → Ohio River → Mississippi River → Gulf of Mexico
- River system: Ohio River
- Tributaries
  - left: unnamed tributaries
  - right: Parmar Run
- Bridges: Wiegmann Road, State Line Road, Cross Creek Road

Scott Run is a 5.40 mi (8.69 km) long 2nd order tributary to Cross Creek in Brooke County, West Virginia.

== Course ==
Scott Run rises about 1.5 miles southeast of Eldersville, Pennsylvania, in Washington County and then flows southwest into West Virginia to join Cross Creek at Scott Run, West Virginia.

== Watershed ==
Scott Run drains 10.04 square miles (26.0 km^{2}) of area, receives about 40.3 in/year of precipitation, has a wetness index of 322.78, and is about 53% forested.

== See also ==
- List of Rivers of West Virginia
- List of Rivers of Pennsylvania
