= Christina Cindrich =

American actress

Christina Cindrich (born 1981 or 1982) is an American television producer, host, and actress. She is the producer and host of Private Islands and Global Passport and has won four Emmy Awards.

Cindrich is the daughter of Ralph Cindrich, an attorney and sports agent. She attended Mt. Lebanon High School, where she was an honor student, performed with the dance troupe, and was head cheerleader. She was Miss Pennsylvania Teen USA 1999 and was active in musical-theater productions in her teenage years. After graduating from high school in 2000 she majored in communications at Loyola Marymount University.

== Filmography ==
Film
Year	Title	Role	Notes
2001	American Pie 2	Jello-Shot Girl (uncredited)	
2002	Comedy Central Thanxgiveaway: Turkeys vs. Pilgrims	Pocahontas	TV movie
2004	Last Men on Earth	Phoebe	Short
2006	Living the Dream	Dog Girl #2	
2007	2095	Shannon	
2007	Spider-Man 3	Test Site Technician	
2009	Immortally Yours	Victoria	
2013	Getting Back to Zero	Pamela	
2014	The 40th Annual NATAS PSW Emmy Awards	Attendee, Recipient	TV movie

Television
Year	Title	Role	Notes
1997	Port Charles	Stacey	12 episodes
2001	Off Centre	Candy	Episode: "Trust Me or Don't Trust Me"
2004	Frasier	The Cable Woman	Episode: "Freudian Sleep"
2004	I'm with Her	Julie	Episode: "I'm Not with Her"
2004	Quintuplets	Catherine Zeta-Juggs	Episode: "Swing, Swing, Swing"
2004	Boston Legal	Julia	Episode: "An Eye for an Eye"
2004	According to Jim	Christina	Episode: "Poking the Bear"
2005	Jack & Bobby	Kappa Sister	Episode: "Running Scared"
2005	Las Vegas	Hottie/"Kitty"	Episode: "Mothwoman"
2005	Four Kings	Sherry	Episode: "Elephant in the Room"
2005	Desperate Housewives	Second Stripper	Episode: "Everybody Says Don't"
2006	Who Wants to Be a Superhero?	Stacy	Episode Three
2007	CSI: Crime Scene Investigation	Cocktail Waitress	Episode: "Cockroaches"
2011–2015	Private Islands	Herself	
2014–present	Global Passport with Christina Cindrich	Herself	
