= West Middletown Historic District =

Historic district in Pennsylvania, United States

- U.S. National Register of Historic Places
- U.S. Historic district
- Washington County History & Landmarks Foundation Landmark
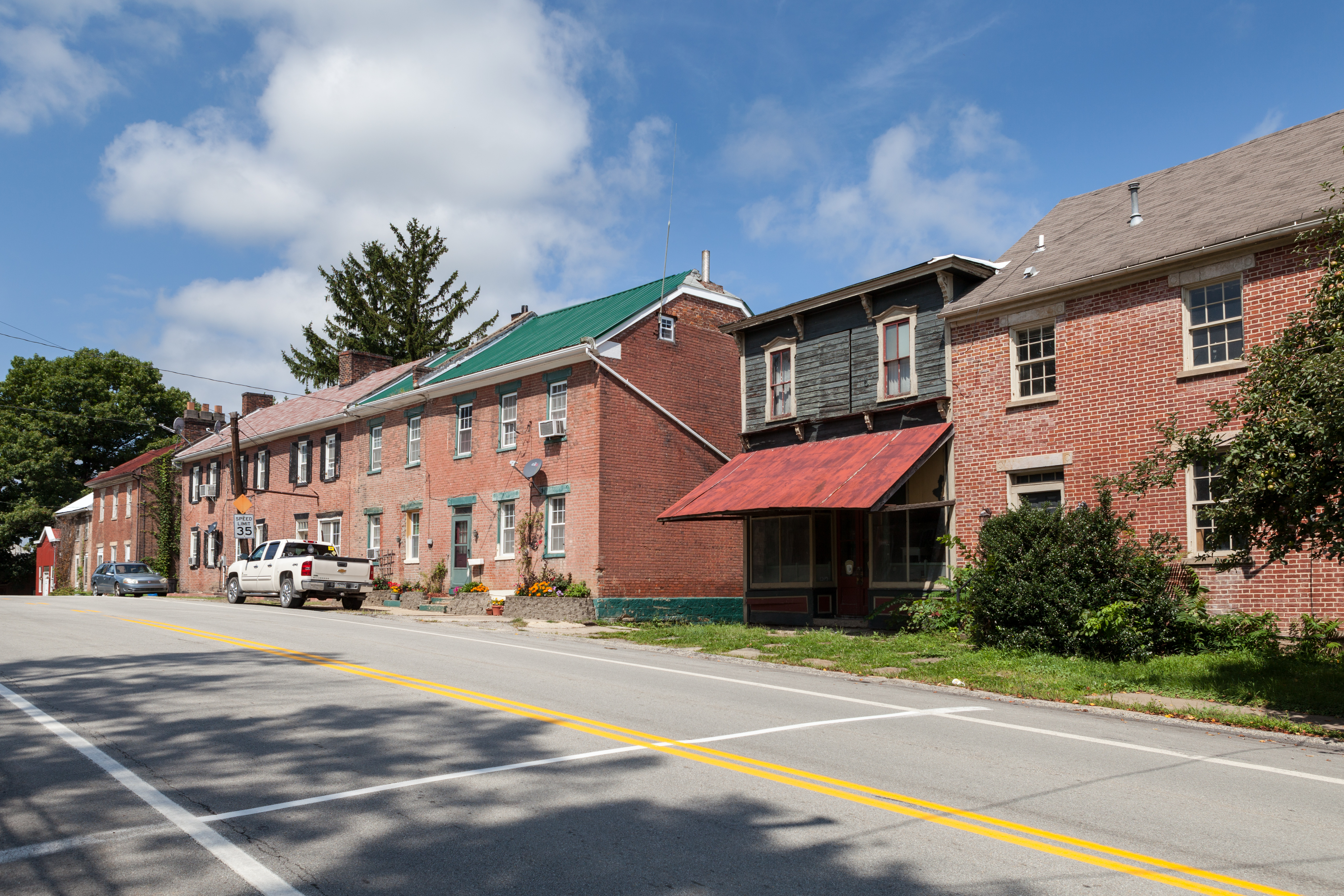
- Looking to the west in the historic district near 12 E Main St, August 2014

- Location within Pennsylvania Location within the United States
- Location: Main St., West Middletown, Pennsylvania
- Coordinates: 40°14′34″N 80°25′34″W
- Area: 17.9 acres (7.2 ha)
- NRHP reference No.: 85001740
- Added to NRHP: August 08, 1985

West Middletown Historic District is a historic district in West Middletown, Pennsylvania.

It is designated as a historic district by the Washington County History & Landmarks Foundation.
