= Quamby Estate =

Historic homestead in Tasmania, Australia

- Interactive map of the Quamby Estate area

General information
- Location: Hagley, 1145 Westwood Road, Australia
- Coordinates: 41°30′47″S 146°55′58″E

Quamby Estate is a country homestead situated on 150 acres in Tasmania's Meander Valley. The estate is a Tasmanian historically important property and dates back to 1828. Quamby was the home of Sir Richard Dry, a premier of Tasmania and the first native-born premier and knight in any Australian colony. The property is now a commercial luxury lodge.

The estate features a white Anglo-Indian designed main homestead referred to as Tasmania's Government House of the North, a function pavilion and a golf course. It is situated near the historic township of Hagley.

== History ==
=== Early period ===
Quamby Estate was the home of Sir Richard Dry and during his time as premier, Quamby Homestead became known as the "Government House of the North". Sir Richard Dry was born at Elphin Farm, Launceston, on 7 September 1815. His father, Richard Dry Senior had been transported to Tasmania as a political prisoner for his part in the Irish rebellion of 1804, but was granted his freedom in 1818.

When Dry (Senior) died in 1843 he left the Quamby Estate's 30,000 acres (120 km^{2}) to his son. Portions of the land have been sold off over time; by 1963 the estate was reduced to 600 acres (2.4 km^{2}). Quamby Estate's main house is a 33-room building in the American Colonial style, that was built over 10 years from 1828.

Sir Richard Dry had no heirs and just prior to his death in 1868 he had begun to shed the vast acreage of Quamby Estate. He was buried beneath the chancery in the Church he founded, St Mary's at Hagley. Soon after Lady Dry sold Quamby and sailed for England. At the time it was one of the most important land sales ever held in Tasmania.

=== Subdivision ===
In 1875, Quamby was sold to Victorian grazier J. J. Phelps, at which time it encompassed 11,800 acres (4,800 ha). Phelps did not renew the leases of most tenant farmers and converted 4,000 acres (1,600 ha) of agricultural land to pasture. Due to a corresponding downturn in wool prices, the estate was neglected and in 1887 Phelps subdivided the original property into 39 farms. The main property of 970 acres (390 ha) was acquired by George Gregory and remained in the ownership of the Gregory family until the 1950s, by which time it had been reduced to 640 acres (260 ha). It was subsequently purchased by John and Sallie Barnett, who undertook restoration of the homestead in the 1960s.

== Recognition ==
Quamby Estate is listed on both the now-defunct Register of the National Estate and the Tasmanian Heritage Register.

== Current usage ==
Current owners and Virgin Australia founders Brett Godfrey and Rob Sherrard purchased Quamby Estate in 2010. They have also invested in several other tourism assets including the Tasmanian Walking Company, Lake House and Low Head in Tasmania. Godfrey co-owns Makepeace Island in Queensland with Sir Richard Branson. In 2011 Quamby Estate was fully restored to a lodge housing 10 guest rooms. Quamby Estate is also the base for Tasmanian Walking Companies' Bay of Fires and Cradle Mountain Huts Guided Walks

In the early 1990s, the lodge added a golf course, whose 8th hole is the longest par 5 in Tasmania at 576 metres. The Georgian Club House was built in the 1850s as original Estate Manager's office.
