= Cindrich & Company =

Cindrich & Company is an international company in sports, entertainment, expert witness services, mediation and arbitration. Founded in 1981 by former NFL player, long-time NFL agent and licensed attorney Ralph Cindrich. Headed by Cindrich, the company acts as lead negotiator and counsel on the buying and selling of sports businesses and agencies. As an agent, Cindrich represents professional athletes and acts as consultant to third parties. Cindrich also provides testimony as an expert witness in sports related litigation and can serve as a neutral third party mediator and/or arbitrator.

== Early representation ==
As a linebacker for the Houston Oilers in 1975, Cindrich enrolled in law school at nearby South Texas College of Law, in Houston. While still a member of the Oilers, teammates of Cindrich approached him with legal questions, mostly relating to their NFL contracts and/or marketing agreements. Cindrich occasionally took those “real world” issues into his law classes and found answers or resolutions, which he then relayed to his teammates.

In 1977—while still in law school—Cindrich received his first exposure in marketing and law by reviewing contracts or issues of former teammates. His first football client was a former teammate at the University of Pittsburgh named Glenn Hyde. Hyde had played professional football in all three professional leagues, as a left guard for the Chicago Fire (1974–1975) and the Charlotte Hornets (1975) of the World Football League, the Chicago Blitz of the United States Football League (1984) and the Denver Broncos, Baltimore Colts, Seattle Seahawks and Kansas City Chiefs of the National Football League (1976–1982, 1985–1987). Cindrich and Hyde had been teammates at the University of Pittsburgh.

Upon graduation (and after his retirement from football), Cindrich practiced criminal and business law in Texas before developing a specialty in sports management. He founded Athletes Of America Inc., a sports management firm, based in Houston in 1978. Over the next few years, Cindrich would represent a handful of players who had made the transition from college to the NFL, including several from the University of Pittsburgh and the University of Arkansas.

== Tom Brzoza case ==
In addition to negotiating marketing deals and contracts for players, Cindrich applied his legal expertise to an important NFL case when fellow Western Pennsylvania native Tom Brzoza approached Cindrich for legal counsel in the fall of 1978. Brzoza, an All-American center at the University of Pittsburgh, had been selected by his hometown Pittsburgh Steelers in the 11th round of the 1978 NFL draft. But during a practice session at Three Rivers Stadium in May, just weeks after he had been drafted, Brzoza injured his thumb. (It was later revealed that this practice session violated NFL off-season regulations against conducting practices with shoulder pads. As penalty, the Steelers forfeited their third round draft choice in the 1979 draft.)

Because of the injured thumb, Brzoza was forced to switch from center to guard and the Steelers subsequently released Brzoza on August 7, 1978, shortly after training camp began. On behalf of his client, Cindrich argued that the injured thumb—as a result of the Steelers violation—kept Brzoza from entering camp at full health and thus was a factor in his being cut from the team.

In September, Cindrich told reporters:

“We request that Tom be paid his salary because he was denied an opportunity to practice his trade because [he] was injured in an illegal camp of the Steelers, that was in violation of the NFL Constitution.”

Cindrich threatened to sue for damages and after months of negotiating—and one-on-one meeting between Cindrich and Steelers owner Art Rooney—the two sides reached a settlement in early March 1979:

“We’re still friends,” Cindrich told reporters. “The Steelers are the Cadillac of the NFL. We left with a great deal of respect for them. They don’t give anything away, but they’re fair. They’re gentleman. Both sides thought the settlement was extremely fair. Both sides are fortunate the way it worked out.”

== Creation of Cindrich & Company ==
In 1981 Cindrich returned to his native Western Pennsylvania and brought his management firm (now renamed Cindrich & Company) with him. That same year, Cindrich landed his first big-name client, Mark May, the offensive tackle from, the University of Pittsburgh who the Washington Redskins selected May with their first round pick (20th overall) in the 1981 NFL draft. After tough negotiations that summer with the Redskins General Manager Bobby Beathard, May signed with the team in late July putting to rest rumors that he would bolt to the Canadian Football League. Cindrich continues to represent May in all his television contracts.

By the 1985 NFL draft, Cindrich & Company would represent two top prospects: Al Toon from the University of Wisconsin and Bill Fralic from the University of Pittsburgh. During ESPN’s televised coverage of the draft, Mel Kiper Jr. stated:

“We’ll see what an impact Ralph Cindrich has on this draft right away. I think Minnesota wanted (Bill) Fralic. I know, you talk about Indianapolis, they would have taken Al Toon but he (Cindrich) wrote a letter to Irsay stating that he didn’t want Toon to play with the Colts. Same with Minnesota. So we’ll see if those teams shy away from Fralic and Toon. We will see if Cindrich has a direct impact on the draft.”

Cindrich told the press that Fralic would not want to play for the Minnesota Vikings, who held the second overall pick, because of the team’s negotiating history. On Draft Day, the Vikings traded their pick to the Atlanta Falcons for a 1st and 3rd round selection. The Atlanta Falcons then selected Fralic, who signed the most lucrative contract for any lineman in the draft, including the top overall pick, Buffalo’s Bruce Smith. The Atlanta Journal & Atlanta Constitution reported that:

“Fralic’s contract is so lucrative that it has caused slowdown in the next eleven picks below him in the first round of the draft. No other Number 1 has such an annuity package nor a present value this high. Defensive end Bruce Smith, the draft’s No. 1 pick, signed a $2.8 Million contract for the Buffalo Bills, which is worth $2.1 million in present value. When Fralic signed Monday and first reports of the numbers leaked out, agent Joe Courrege immediately upped the demand for Texas A&M defensive end Ray Childress, the draft’s No. 3 selection.”

The New York Jets selected Toon with the 10th overall pick. He held out, and still without a contract by late August, Cindrich publicly suggested that the Jets trade Toon. But by Week 2 of the regular season (after New York lost 31-0 to the Los Angeles Raiders), Toon signed a deal reportedly worth $1.6 million over five years, including a signing bonus worth $475,000. The deal paid him more money than any other receiver drafted in 1985, including the San Francisco 49ers first round selection, Jerry Rice.

In the 1988 NFL draft, Cindrich represented University of Wisconsin Offensive Tackle Paul Gruber, who the Tampa Bay Buccaneers selected Gruber with the 4th overall pick in the draft. Gruber missed four weeks of training camp but signed a five year, $3.8 million deal with the team in early August. That month, The Sporting News declared Cindrich’s negotiations “the most significant contract for any rookie this year” and “the best contract ever signed by an offensive lineman and likely will start a new salary spiral at the position.”

The next year, Cindrich & Company helped facilitate the now famous "Herschel Walker trade" between the Dallas Cowboys and Minnesota Vikings. As part of his new contract with the Vikings, Walker received $1.25 million in cash and other considerations (including a Mercedes-Benz) and more than doubled his previous salary. Cindrich had now negotiated the second and third most lucrative contracts in the NFL. He also achieved considerable salary raises for Pro Bowlers John Offerdahl, linebacker for the Miami Dolphins, Buffalo Bills Shane Conlan (linebacker), Will Wolford (offensive tackle), and Kent Hull (center).

== The 1990s ==
Cindrich & Company would go on to represent Pittsburgh Steelers Pro Bowl tight end Eric Green, Washington Redskins Pro Bowl wide receiver Gary Clark, Dallas Cowboys Pro Bowl center Mark Stepnoski. In May 1993, just as the NFL Free Agency boom began, USA Today called Cindrich “the undisputed free agent champ.”

Multi-million dollar contracts continued throughout the decade. Steelers perennial Pro Bowl center Dermontti Dawson, New York Giants running back Rodney Hampton, quarterbacks Gus Frerotte and Jeff Blake, were a few of Cindrich & Company's clients. During the late 1990s and early 2000s, he represented several of the NFL’s top centers: Dawson, Stepnoski, Hull, Miami Dolphin Tim Ruddy, Tampa Bay Buccaneer Jeff Christy, Baltimore Raven Mike Flynn and Indianapolis Colt Jeff Saturday, and New Orleans Saint LeCharles Bentley.

== The 2000s to today ==
Cindrich & Company was sold to DeBartolo Sports, the agency owned by former NFL owner Eddie DeBartolo, Jr. and Cindrich serves as a consultant to DeBartolo. Nevertheless, he continues to negotiate contracts—through Cindrich & Company—for such notable players as Arizona Cardinals running Back Beanie Wells, Indianapolis Colts All Pro Center Jeff Saturday, and Steelers linebacker James Farrior. Cindrich & Company has also been involved in expanding the field of sports law, developing a study abroad sports law class for students. Cindrich will teach in coordination with the South Texas College of Law during the summer of 2010 in Florence, Italy. He is also planning a legal education sports law class for lawyers at the same time and location.

== The Blind Side ==
Cindrich & Company represented offensive tackle Will Wolford before the 1986 NFL draft. The Buffalo Bills selected Wolford with the 20th overall pick and Cindrich negotiated a salary equal to several players drafted in the top 10. In 1993, Cindrich orchestrated Wolford’s free agent signing with Indianapolis, where his contract was worth $7.65 million over three year. Wolford became the highest paid offensive lineman in the NFL. When that contract expired in 1995, Wolford signed a four-year, $10 million with the Pittsburgh Steelers.

Michael Lewis’ book, The Blind Side, which in 2009 was made into a major motion picture starring Sandra Bullock, mentions Wolford’s landmark contract with the Indianapolis Colts. As the man who brokered the deal, Cindrich was also mentioned:

Wolford’s agent, Ralph Cindrich, later said that at least four other teams had been willing to match the Colts’ offer. What had set the Colts apart from the other bidders was a clause they agreed to insert into Wolford’s new contract. It guaranteed that Will Wolford, left tackle, would remain the highest paid player on the Colts’ offense for as long as he played on it. Better paid than the Colts’ running backs, the Colts’ wide receivers, or any of the other acknowledged stars. Even if the Colts went out and got themselves the NFL’s most expensive quarterback, Wolford’s salary would rise to eclipse his, too. “I thought linemen would get a little more money from free agency,” said Wolford later. “But I didn’t think that would happen. I was numb.”

…The NFL didn’t like the idea of any player having a clause in his contract guaranteeing him more money than his teammates, and it made noises about voiding the deal. That’s when Ralph Cindrich went on the warpath. He asked, pointedly, if the league would have the same reservations if the clause had been in some quarterback’s contract. He accused the league, in the pages of the New York Times, of “discrimination against offensive linemen.” And the NFL let the deal slide, but only after saying no such deal would be permitted in the future. “There’s a mentality about linemen that goes back to high school,” said Cindrich. “When you picked your football team, these were the last guys picked.”
