= Richard Dry =

Australian politician (1815–1869)

Sir Richard Dry KCMG
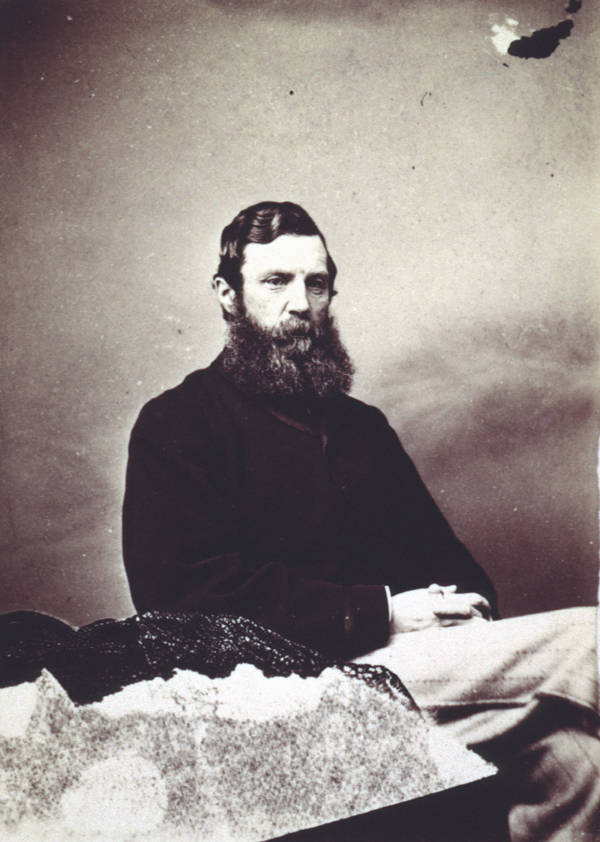

7th Premier of Tasmania
- In office 24 November 1866 – 1 August 1869
- Preceded by: James Whyte
- Succeeded by: James Milne Wilson

Personal details
- Born: 20 September 1815 Launceston, Van Diemen's Land
- Died: 1 August 1869 (aged 53) Hobart, Tasmania
- Spouse: Clara Meredith

Sir Richard Dry, KCMG (20 September 1815 – 1 August 1869) was an Australian politician, the son of United Irish convict, who was Premier of Tasmania from 24 November 1866 until 1 August 1869 when he died in office. Dry was the first Tasmanian-born premier, and the first Tasmanian to be knighted.

== Early life ==
Dry was born in Launceston, Van Diemen's Land (now Tasmania), the son of Richard Dry, an officer and pastoralist, and his wife Anne, née Maughan. The elder Dry had been transported from Ireland in advance of the 1798 rebellion. Although a Protestant and a Dublin woollen-draper, he had been a senior figure in the largely Catholic and agrarian Defender movement as well as being a senior United Irishmen.

Dry was educated at a Kirkland's private school in Campbell Town. Dry was a close friend of the diarist Anna Baxter who was the wife of the recently arrived British Lieutenant Andrew Baxter in the 1830s. In 1835 Dry voyaged to Mauritius and the British ports in India, on his return to Tasmania he managed his father's 30,000-acre Quamby Estate near Hagley which he inherited on this death in 1843. Encounters with the native Palawa people and reports of Europeans shooting them feature in the area's history and mythology. Stephen Dry, was reportedly speared by an aboriginal on a hill near Hagley. Quamby was the name of the Palawa (William Lyttleton Quamby) who had led the local native resistance.

== Colonial politics ==
In 1837, Dry was made a magistrate and, in 1844, Lieutenant-Governor Sir John Eardley-Wilmot nominated Dry a non-official member of the Tasmanian Legislative Council. He resigned his seat with five others, who together became known as the "patriotic six", after a conflict with Governor Wilmot over the Wilmont's refusal acknowledge the cost to the colony of the convict system which caused free labour to leave and his use of casting vote in the Council to block inquiries and secure his budget. In 1848 the six resigning members were re-nominated to the Council, and when the Council was reconstituted in 1851 Dry, who was then a leading member of the Anti-transportation League, was elected as a member for Launceston, defeating Adye Douglas.

When the Council met in 1851, Dry was unanimously appointed its Speaker and remained so for four years before resigning his seat in July 1855. Dry then took a long trip to Europe for health reasons. Dry returned to Tasmania in 1860, was elected to the Legislative Council in 1862, and on 24 November 1866 became premier and colonial secretary. During his time as Premier, Quamby Estate's Homestead became known as the "Government House of the North". Dry had been much interested in the introduction of railways, was chairman of the Launceston and Deloraine Railway Association, and president of the Northern Railway League. His government succeeded in making some economies, introduced the Torrens real property act, and pushed the sale of crown lands.

In 1869 Dry's government established telegraphic communication with Victoria by laying a cable under Bass Strait.

== Personal life ==
On 1 August 1869 Dry died in Hobart, Tasmania after a short illness. In 1853 he had married Clara Meredith, daughter of George Meredith, who survived him. They had no children. He was buried at St Mary's Anglican church in Hagley, which he had endowed. The church's tower is dedicated to his wife. He was knighted in 1858, the first Tasmanian to be granted that honour.

== Legacy ==
Dry was the first native of Tasmania to enter its parliament. He was barely 30 when his fight for political freedom made him extremely popular, and he retained this popularity all his life. He declared a wish that he might be buried at Hagley church near Quamby; a church he had himself built and endowed. At Hobart all business was suspended on the morning of his funeral, and during the four days' journey to the church the residents of every township on the route joined in the procession. His modest kindliness (it was said of him that he never condescended because he never thought of anyone being inferior to himself), his public and private charities, his honourable character, earned the respect and affection of the whole colony. A chancel was added to Hagley church by public subscription as a memorial to him, and there his body was laid. The "Dry Scholarship" was also founded by public subscription in connexion with the Tasmanian scholarships.

== Sources ==
- "Dry, Richard". Members of the Parliament of Tasmania.
- Serle, Percival (1949). "Dry, Richard". Dictionary of Australian Biography. Sydney: Angus & Robertson.
- John Reynolds, 'Dry, Sir Richard (1815 - 1869)', Australian Dictionary of Biography, Volume 1, MUP, 1966, pp 329–330. Retrieved on 4 October 2008

Additional sources listed by the Australian Dictionary of Biography:

- A. D. Baker, The Life and Times of Sir Richard Dry (Hobart, 1951); W. A. Townsley, Struggle for Self-Government in Tasmania (Hobart, 1951); F. C. Green (ed), A Century of Responsible Government 1856-1956 (Hobart, 1956); L. L. Robson, Press and Politics (M.A. thesis, University of Tasmania, 1954); Examiner (Launceston), 13 Aug, 6 Dec 1855, 24 Nov 1859, 3 Aug 1869; GO 33/53/931, 33/57/1327 (Archives Office of Tasmania).

Political offices
Preceded by James Whyte	Premier of Tasmania; 1866–1869	Succeeded by James Wilson
Tasmanian Legislative Council
New seat	Member for Launceston; 1851–1855	Succeeded by Adye Douglas; Ronald Gunn
Preceded by William Henty	Member for Tamar; 1862–1869; Served alongside: Button/Corbett/Weedon/Sherwin	Succeeded by William Grubb; William Hutchins
