= West Middletown, Pennsylvania =

Borough in Pennsylvania, US

West Middletown
- Borough
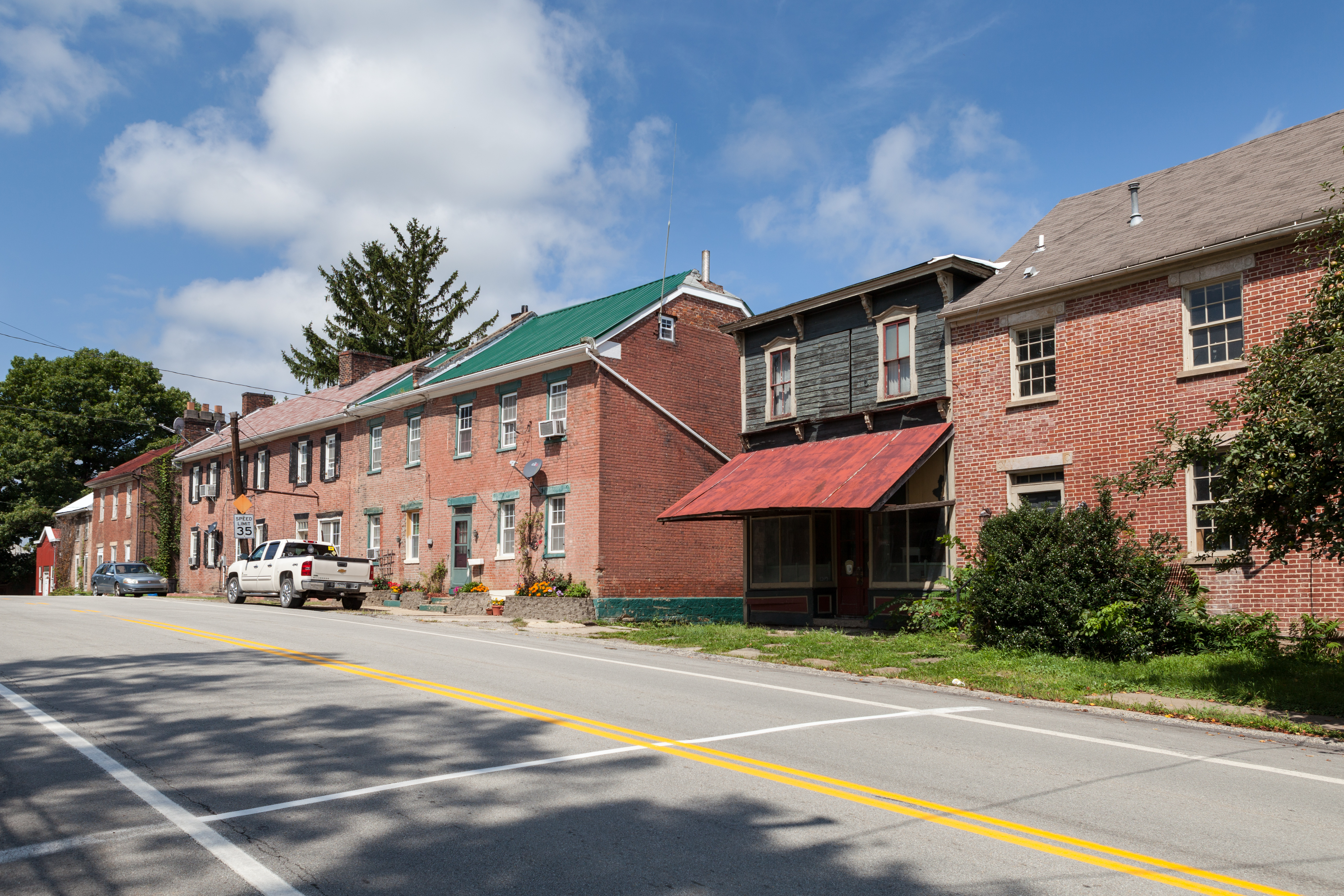
- Main Street

- Location of West Middletown in Washington County, Pennsylvania.

- Location of West Middletown in Pennsylvania
- Coordinates: 40°14′25″N 80°25′27″W
- Country: United States
- State: Pennsylvania
- County: Washington
- Established: 1795

Area
  - Total: 0.41 sq mi (1.05 km^{2})
  - Land: 0.41 sq mi (1.05 km^{2})
  - Water: 0 sq mi (0.00 km^{2})

Population (2020)
  - Total: 109 ▼
  - Estimate (2021): 108
  - Density: 327.7/sq mi (126.51/km^{2})
- Time zone: UTC-4 (EST)
  - Summer (DST): UTC-5 (EDT)
- Area code: 724
- FIPS code: 42-83504
- Website: https://westmiddletownpa.com/

West Middletown is a borough in Washington County, Pennsylvania, United States. The population was 109 at the 2020 census.

== History ==
The West Middletown Historic District was listed on the National Register of Historic Places in 1985.

== Geography ==
West Middletown is located at 40°14′25″N 80°25′27″W (40.240402, -80.424140).

According to the United States Census Bureau, the borough has a total area of 0.4 square miles (1.0 km^{2}), all land.

== Demographics ==
Historical population
| Census | Pop. | Note | %± |
|---|---|---|---|
| 1840 | 260 | | — |
| 1850 | 326 | | 25.4% |
| 1860 | 332 | | 1.8% |
| 1870 | 346 | | 4.2% |
| 1880 | 312 | | −9.8% |
| 1890 | 235 | | −24.7% |
| 1900 | 241 | | 2.6% |
| 1910 | 274 | | 13.7% |
| 1920 | 226 | | −17.5% |
| 1930 | 244 | | 8.0% |
| 1940 | 264 | | 8.2% |
| 1950 | 268 | | 1.5% |
| 1960 | 199 | | −25.7% |
| 1970 | 195 | | −2.0% |
| 1980 | 215 | | 10.3% |
| 1990 | 166 | | −22.8% |
| 2000 | 144 | | −13.3% |
| 2010 | 139 | | −3.5% |
| 2020 | 109 | | −21.6% |
| 2025 (est.) | 107 | ▼ | −1.8% |

As of the census of 2000, there were 144 people, 61 households, and 43 families living in the borough. The population density was 353.9 inhabitants per square mile (136.6/km^{2}). There were 69 housing units at an average density of 169.6 per square mile (65.5/km^{2}). The racial makeup of the borough was 90.28% White, 4.17% African American, 1.39% Pacific Islander, and 4.17% from two or more races.

There were 61 households, out of which 26.2% had children under the age of 18 living with them, 60.7% were married couples living together, 6.6% had a female householder with no husband present, and 29.5% were non-families. 23.0% of all households were made up of individuals, and 11.5% had someone living alone who was 65 years of age or older. The average household size was 2.36 and the average family size was 2.84.

In the borough the population was spread out, with 17.4% under the age of 18, 7.6% from 18 to 24, 22.9% from 25 to 44, 30.6% from 45 to 64, and 21.5% who were 65 years of age or older. The median age was 46 years. For every 100 females there were 108.7 males. For every 100 females age 18 and over, there were 105.2 males.

The median income for a household in the borough was $41,250, and the median income for a family was $41,875. Males had a median income of $25,000 versus $30,625 for females. The per capita income for the borough was $24,834. There were 5.3% of families and 6.9% of the population living below the poverty line, including 18.5% of under eighteens and 3.8% of those over 64.

== Education ==
It is in the Avella Area School District.
