= Makepeace Island =

Island in Queensland, Australia

Coordinates: 26.3805°S 153.0445°E

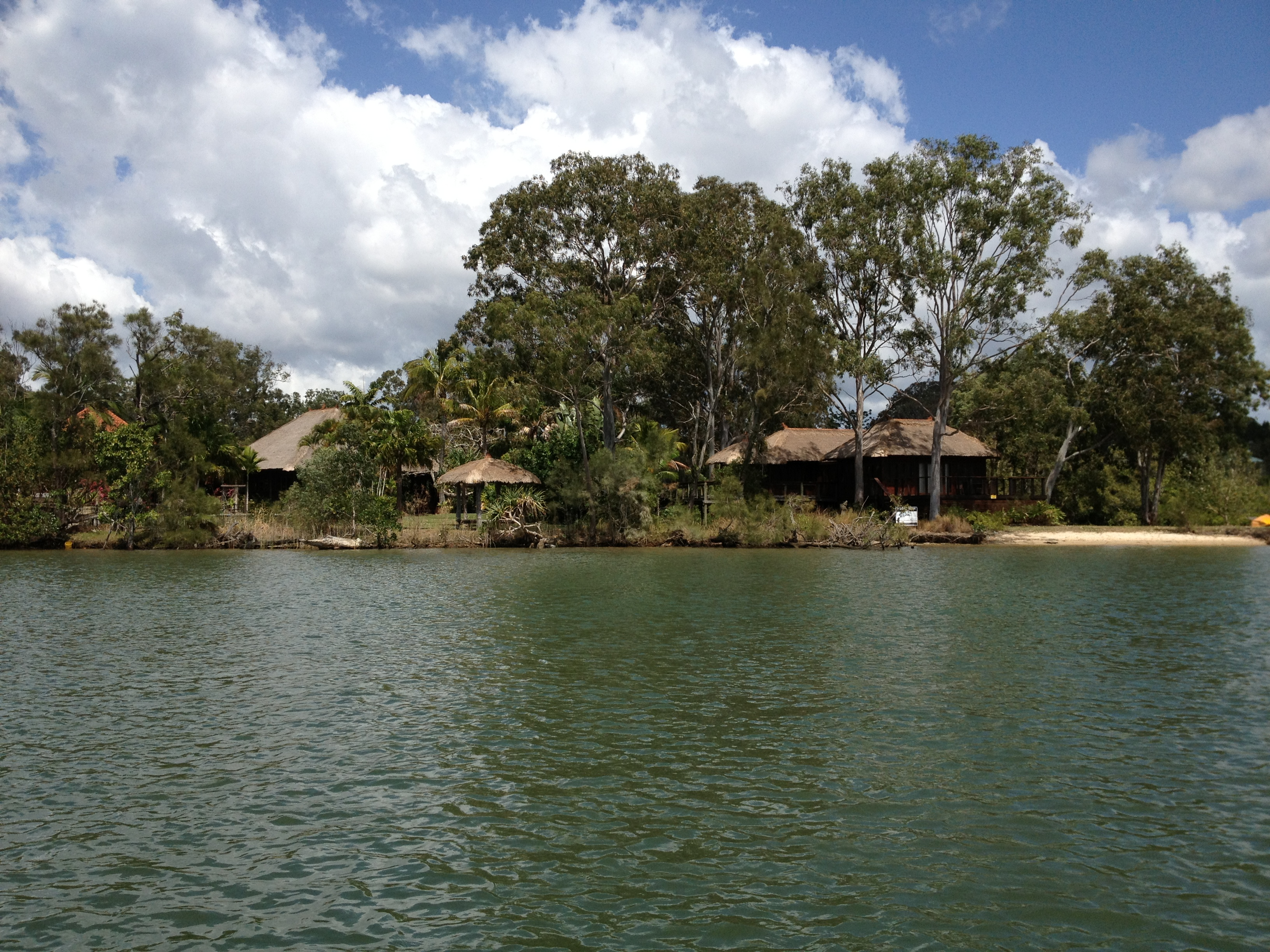
- Makepeace Island
- Interactive map of Makepeace Island

Geography
- Location: Noosa River

Administration
- Australia
- State: Queensland
- LGA: Virgin Group

Makepeace Island is a small heart shaped island in the Noosa River in the Shire of Noosa on the Sunshine Coast, Queensland, Australia. The island is currently owned by Virgin Australia (formerly known as Virgin Blue) founding partners, Brett Godfrey and Sir Richard Branson. The island is Branson's Australian home and can hold up to 22 guests accommodated in three 2-bedroom villas and a 4-bedroom Balinese style home. The property has a tennis court, theatre, two-storey Balinese wantilan, 500,000-litre pool and indoor bar and dining area.

== History ==
The island (previously known as Pig Island) was named after former owner, Hannah Makepeace who was bequeathed it by her employer for her faithful years of service on the island. Hannah was on the island as housekeeper and then owner until she died at the age of 89 in 1973. The island was originally gazetted as owned by Charles Nicholas and his wife Agnes Alberta Nicholson in 1911. Hannah Makepeace was hired in 1924, and as he had no children, they bequeathed the island to Hannah, who took possession of it in 1950.

Hannah was known by the community as a colourful character.

"Both my parents were teachers locally and would tell us all about Miss Makepeace, she was quite a character by all accounts."

— Dennis O'Neill (Current caretaker), The Noosa Journal

After Hannah died the island was owned by the state until 1986 when artist Brian Spencer bought the property and renamed it to Makepeace Island in honour of Hannah.

The island was bought in 2003 by Brett Godfrey and Rob Sherrard before Sir Richard Branson bought Rob's half in 2007.

Later that year, construction began on the island to turn it into a luxury resort. The designing of the property was done by Christopher Thomas and Mark Alexander, in collaboration with Brett's wife, Zahra Godfrey.

"Much of the beautiful result is due to Zahra and her designers carrying the Balinese theme from the gardens to the decor."

— Sir Richard Branson, Sunday Mail

Gardens and indoor decor include giant sculptures, teak, granite and stone finishes, volcanic boulder bathtubs, ornamental lighting and antiquities and furniture commissioned and acquired in Bali, Java and elsewhere throughout Indonesia.

In July, 2011, Makepeace Island was officially opened as 'Sir Richard's Australian Home' and was made available to the public for exclusive use hire.

== A private island ==
After construction was completed in 2009, Makepeace Island was used as a family holiday location for the owners and a function venue for Virgin Blue. Hip hop group the Black Eyed Peas and photographer Russell James attended the island launch.

In 2013 the property featured on the Seven Network's The X Factor with Natalie Bassingthwaighte and Guy Sebastian staying on the property.

The island can hold up to 22 guests.

== See also ==
- List of islands of Australia
