= Cross Creek (West Virginia) =

Tributary of the Ohio River

Cross Creek Tributary to Ohio River
- Location of Cross Creek mouth Cross Creek (West Virginia) (the United States)

Location
- Country: United States
- States: West Virginia; Pennsylvania
- Counties: Brooke (WV); Washington (PA)

Physical characteristics
- Source: unnamed tributary to Georges Run divide
  - location: about 1.5 miles northeast of Buffalo, Pennsylvania
  - coordinates: 40°14′19″N 080°19′59″W
  - elevation: 1,300 ft (400 m)
- Mouth: Ohio River
  - location: about 1 mile south of Follansbee, West Virginia
  - coordinates: 40°18′26″N 080°36′00″W
  - elevation: 644 ft (196 m)
- Length: 21.72 mi (34.95 km)
- Basin size: 79.84 square miles (206.8 km^{2})
- Discharge
  - location: Ohio River
  - average: 88.14 cu ft/s (2.496 m^{3}/s) at mouth with Ohio River

Basin features
- Progression: Ohio River → Mississippi River → Gulf of Mexico
- River system: Ohio River
- Tributaries
  - left: Haynan Creek; Potrock Run
  - right: South Fork Cross Creek; North Fork Cross Creek; Scott Run; North Potrock Run; Ebenezer Run; Bosley Run
- Waterbodies: Cross Creek Reservoir
- Bridges: Lynn Portal Road, Willow Road, Oakleaf Road, Seminary Road, Avella Road, Gardner Street, Cross Creek Road, Church Alley, Brown Street, Meadowcroft Road (x4), Potrock Road, Louise Street, WV 7 (x2), Grimms Lane, WV 7, WV 2

Cross Creek is a 21.71 mi (34.94 km) long 4th order tributary to the Ohio River in Brooke County, West Virginia.

== Course ==
Cross Creek rises about 1.5 miles northeast of Buffalo, Pennsylvania, in Washington County and then flows northwesterly into West Virginia and Brooke County to join the Ohio River about 1 mile south of Follansbee, West Virginia.

== Watershed ==
Cross Creek drains 79.84 square miles (206.8 km^{2}) of area, receives about 40.1 in/year of precipitation, has a wetness index of 332.83, and is about 59% forested.

== See also ==
- List of rivers of Pennsylvania
- List of rivers of West Virginia
