= Louise, West Virginia =

- Unincorporated community
- Location within the state of West Virginia Louise (the United States)
- Coordinates: 40°18′14″N 80°33′55″W
- Country: United States
- State: West Virginia
- County: Brooke
- Elevation: 725 ft (221 m)
- Time zone: UTC-5 (Eastern (EST))
  - Summer (DST): UTC-4 (EDT)
- GNIS ID: 1555000

Louise is an unincorporated community in Brooke County, West Virginia, United States.
