= Avella, Pennsylvania =

Unincorporated community in Pennsylvania, US

Avella
- Census-designated place
- Location within the U.S. state of Pennsylvania Avella (the United States)
- Coordinates: 40°16′12″N 80°27′0″W
- Country: United States
- State: Pennsylvania
- County: Washington

Area
  - Total: 0.90 sq mi (2.33 km^{2})
  - Land: 0.90 sq mi (2.33 km^{2})
  - Water: 0 sq mi (0.00 km^{2})

Population (2020)
  - Total: 782
  - Density: 867.7/sq mi (335.02/km^{2})
- Time zone: UTC-5 (Eastern (EST))
  - Summer (DST): UTC-4 (EDT)
- ZIP code: 15312
- Area code: 724
- FIPS code: 42-03616

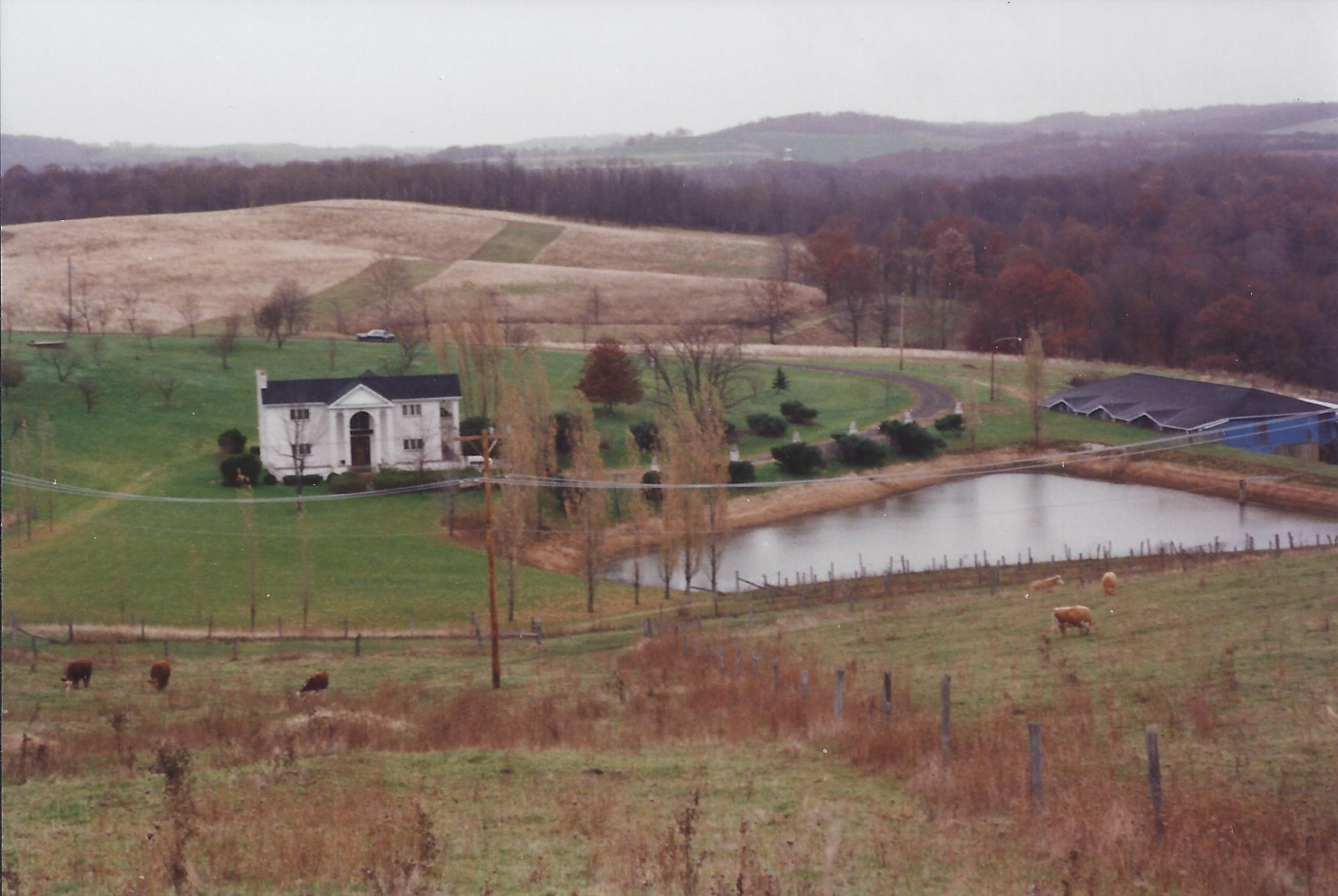
Civil War era home in Avella

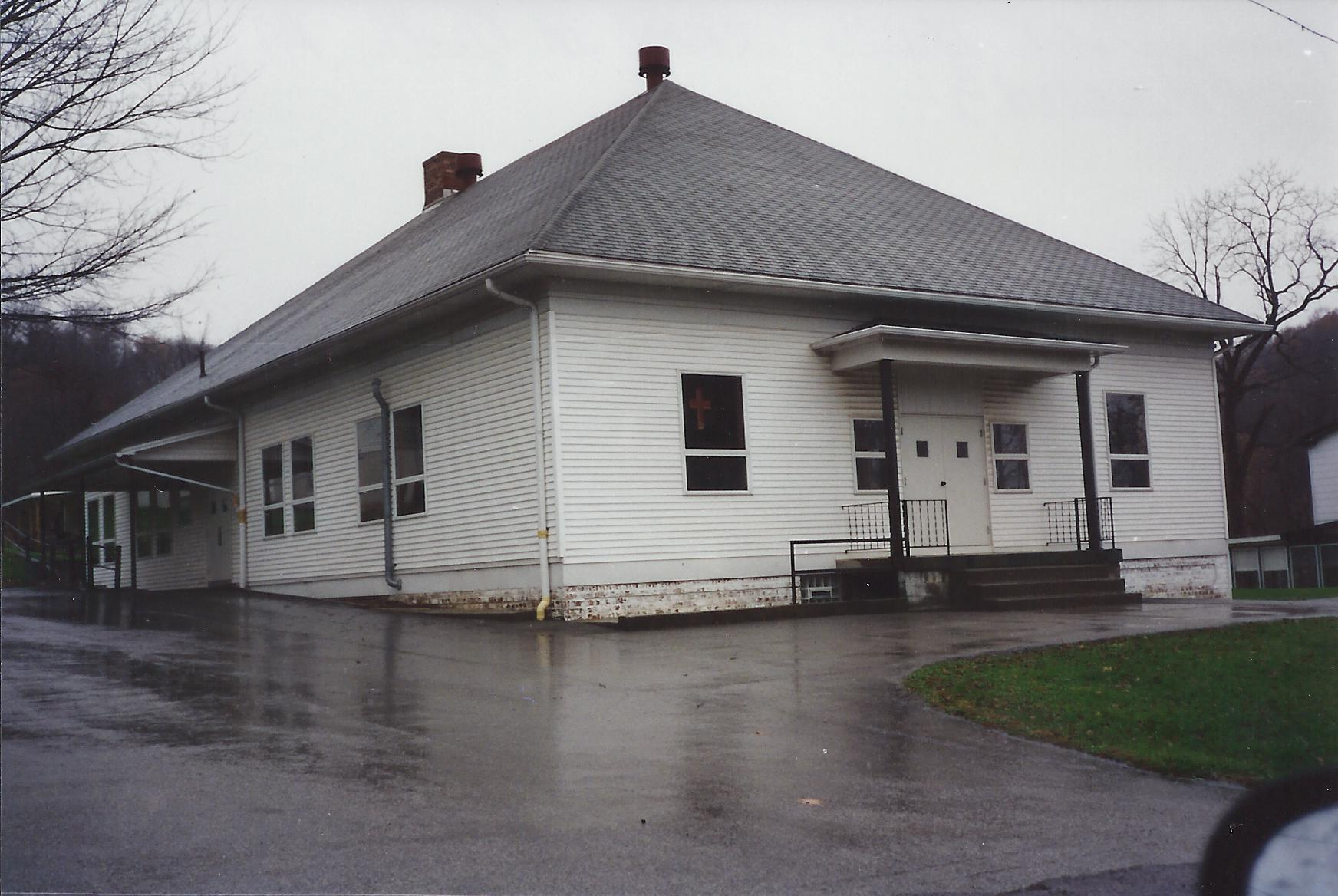
1930s era schoolhouse in Avella

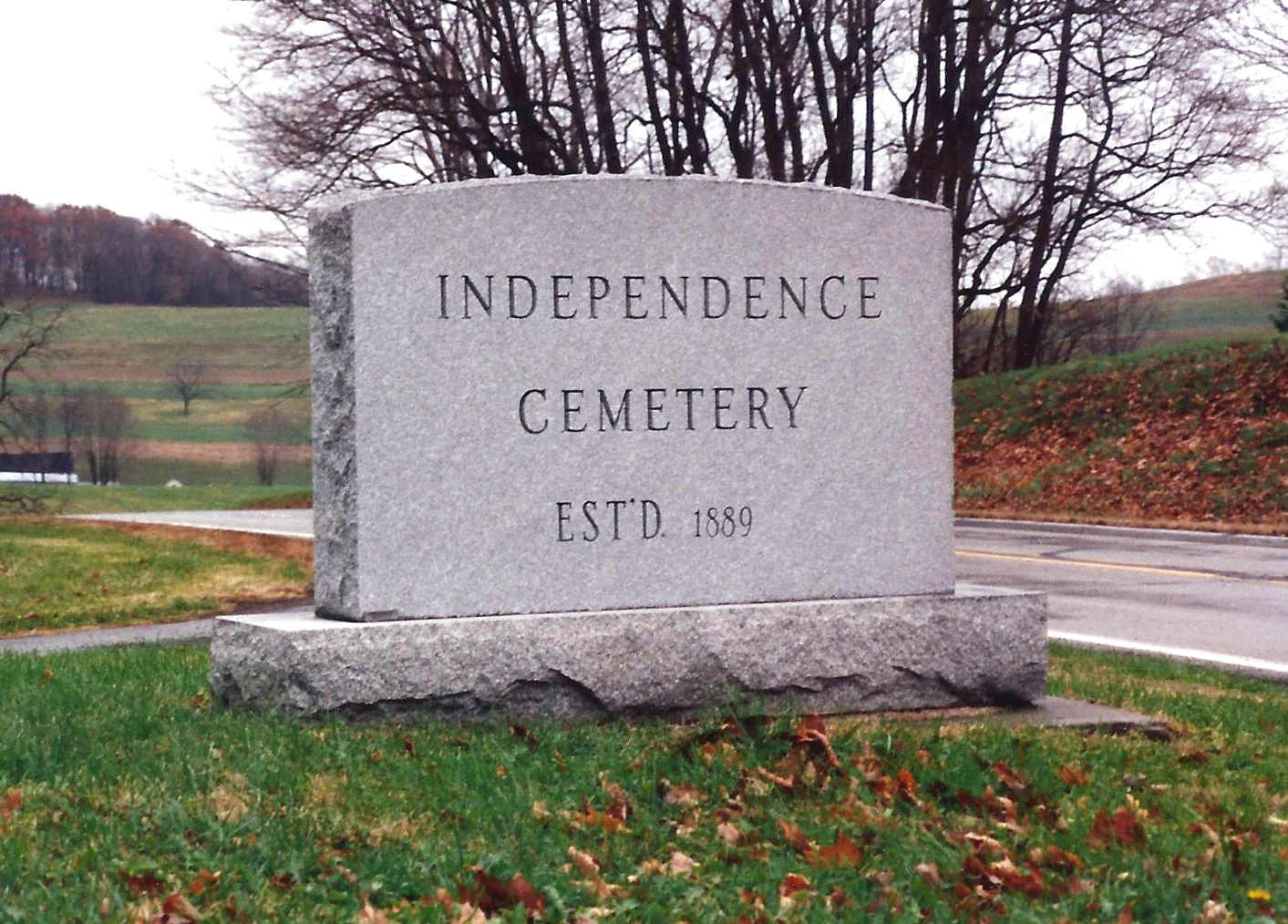
Entrance to Independence Cemetery near Avella

Avella is a census-designated place in Independence Township, Washington County, Pennsylvania, United States. As of the 2020 census, Avella had a population of 782. It is located at 40.27° north & 80.45° west.

== Demographics ==
Historical population
Census	Pop.	Note	%±
2020	782		—
U.S. Decennial Census

== History ==
The ancient history of the area includes some of North America's earliest inhabitants. The Meadowcroft Rockshelter is a prehistoric shelter found below a rock outcropping that is believed to have provided shelter for a succession of early foragers as far back as 16,000 years and possibly as far back as 19,000 years ago, although the dates are controversial. The area also was the site of Eastern Woodland Indians communities some 400 years ago. Today a National Historic Landmark includes a historic interactive display that provides a view of life for early Woodland Indians, as well as 19th Century rural American life.

Avella's early history included American frontiersmen, grist mills and refuge forts during the 18th century, when the area was part of the western frontier. It remains the site of a significant farming community. However, it began to grow after the arrival of the railroad in the early 20th century (the last railroad tunnel was completed in 1903 and served the Wabash Railroad). Completion of the railroad enabled coal mining companies to open numerous mines, making the Avella/Burgettstown area one of the world's most important bituminous coal mining regions.

The mining and railroad opportunities attracted many immigrants in the early 20th century, principally southern and eastern Europeans, and the area grew greatly in size and importance in the first third of the 20th century.

Avella, and the former nearby town of Cliftonville, were the site of labor strife in the coal mining industry. In the midst of a strike, the mine owners began firing union mine works and replacing them with non-union workers. In the Cliftonville Riot, 500 union mine workers marched on the mine in an attempt to shut down the non-union labor. This led to gunfire between the union mineworkers, non-union workers, owners, and the local police department. Between 4 and 13 people died in the riot, including Brooke County Sheriff H.H. Duval. No one involved was ever convicted in crimes relating to the riot and the sheriff's killer was never identified.

The town began a gradual decline as the local coal seams began to give out and the demand for and price of coal dropped. The population declined as the coal mines closed and families moved away looking for other employment opportunities.

== Education ==
It is in the Avella Area School District.

== See also ==
- Avella Area School District
