= Grog (disambiguation) =

Grog is an alcoholic beverage.

Grog or Grogs may also refer to the following:

== Arts and entertainment ==
- Grog (film), a 1982 Italian film starring Franco Nero
- Grogs (Known Space), a fictional alien species in Larry Niven's Known Space universe
- Grog (Marvel Comics), a fictional character in Marvel Comics
- Grog, a character in the B.C. comic strip
- Grog Strongjaw, a goliath barbarian / fighter in the D&D web series Critical Role, The Legend of Vox Machina
- The Grogs, a Canadian puppet troupe
  - Grogs (YTV), various puppet characters

== Other uses ==
- Grogs, a person of lower class and intellect. Often seen in company with Football Hooligans. Distantly related to the Chav
- Grog (clay), a raw material for making ceramics
- Operation Grog, a British Second World War operation
- Grog Run (Ohio), a stream in Ohio, United States
- Grog Run (Buffalo Creek tributary), a river in West Virginia, United States
- Grog, a member of the British band Die So Fluid and a former member of Feline
- Count Grog, American professional wrestling manager, referee, ring announcer, commentator, promoter and booker Greg Mosorjak (born 1961)
- Kava grog, a non-alcoholic beverage made of kava root

== See also ==
- Edward Vernon (1684–1757), English naval officer nicknamed "Old Grog"
- Grogg, a Welsh clay caricature
- Grogger (disambiguation)
