= Narigan Run =

Stream in Pennsylvania, USA

Narigan Run Tributary to Buffalo Creek
- Location of Narigan Run mouth Narigan Run (the United States)

Location
- Country: United States
- State: Pennsylvania
- County: Washington

Physical characteristics
- Source: Sugarcamp Run divide
  - location: pond about 2 miles east-northeast of Frogtown, Washington County, Pennsylvania
  - coordinates: 40°13′03″N 080°28′32″W
  - elevation: 1,170 ft (360 m)
- Mouth: Buffalo Creek
  - location: about 1.5 miles east of Dunsfort, Pennsylvania
  - coordinates: 40°11′09″N 080°28′31″W
  - elevation: 863 ft (263 m)
- Length: 2.20 mi (3.54 km)
- Basin size: 1.79 square miles (4.6 km^{2})
- Discharge
  - location: Buffalo Creek
  - average: 2.15 cu ft/s (0.061 m^{3}/s) at mouth with Buffalo Creek

Basin features
- Progression: Buffalo Creek → Ohio River → Mississippi River → Gulf of Mexico
- River system: Ohio River
- Tributaries
  - left: unnamed tributaries
  - right: unnamed tributaries
- Bridges: Narigon Run Road

Narigan Run is a 2.20 mi (3.54 km) long 1st order tributary to Buffalo Creek in Washington County, Pennsylvania. This is the only stream of this name in the United States.

== Course ==
Narigan Run rises about 2 miles east-northeast of Frogtown, Washington County, Pennsylvania, in Washington County and then flows generally south to join Buffalo Creek about 1.5 miles east of Dunsfort.

== Watershed ==
Narigan Run drains 1.79 square miles (4.6 km^{2}) of area, receives about 40.0 in/year of precipitation, has a wetness index of 300.67, and is about 71% forested.

== See also ==
- List of Pennsylvania Rivers
