= Ralston Run (Dutch Fork tributary) =

Stream in Pennsylvania, USA

Ralston Run Tributary to Dutch Fork
- Location of Ralston Run mouth Ralston Run (Dutch Fork tributary) (the United States)

Location
- Country: United States
- State: Pennsylvania
- County: Washington

Physical characteristics
- Source: Castleman Run divide
  - location: about 2 miles southwest of Budaville, Pennsylvania
  - coordinates: 40°08′52″N 080°29′55″W
  - elevation: 1,160 ft (350 m)
- Mouth: Dutch Fork
  - location: about 1 mile south-southwest of Budaville, Pennsylvania
  - coordinates: 40°08′58″N 080°28′31″W
  - elevation: 928 ft (283 m)
- Length: 1.68 mi (2.70 km)
- Basin size: 1.64 square miles (4.2 km^{2})
- Discharge
  - location: Dutch Fork
  - average: 2.07 cu ft/s (0.059 m^{3}/s) at mouth with Buffalo Creek

Basin features
- Progression: Dutch Fork → Buffalo Creek → Ohio River → Mississippi River → Gulf of Mexico
- River system: Ohio River
- Tributaries
  - left: unnamed tributaries
  - right: unnamed tributaries
- Bridges: Lake Road

Ralston Run is a 1.68 mi (2.70 km) long 1st order tributary to Dutch Fork in Washington County, Pennsylvania.

== Course ==
Ralston Run rises about 2 miles southwest of Budaville, Pennsylvania, in Washington County and then flows southeast then northeast to join Dutch Fork about 1 mile south-southwest of Budaville.

== Watershed ==
Ralston Run drains 1.64 square miles (4.2 km^{2}) of area, receives about 40.4 in/year of precipitation, has a wetness index of 286.81, and is about 68% forested.

== See also ==
- List of Pennsylvania rivers
