= Sawhill =

Sawhill may refer to:

- Isabel Sawhill (born 1937), American economist and writer, wife of John C. Sawhill
- John C. Sawhill (1936–2000), president and CEO of The Nature Conservancy and 12th president of New York University
- Sawhill Covered Bridge, Taylorstown, Washington County, Pennsylvania, United States, on the National Register of Historic Places
- Sawhill Run, a stream in Washington County, Pennsylvania
