= Bonar Creek (Dutch Fork tributary) =

Stream in Pennsylvania, USA

Bonar Creek Tributary to Dutch Fork
- Location of Bonar Creek mouth Bonar Creek (Dutch Fork tributary) (the United States)

Location
- Country: United States
- State: Pennsylvania
- County: Washington

Physical characteristics
- Source: Robinson Fork divide
  - location: about 3 miles southwest of Claysville, Pennsylvania
  - coordinates: 40°05′10″N 080°25′57″W
  - elevation: 1,258 ft (383 m)
- Mouth: Dutch Fork
  - location: Coon Island, Pennsylvania
  - coordinates: 40°06′44″N 080°27′42″W
  - elevation: 997 ft (304 m)
- Length: 2.60 mi (4.18 km)
- Basin size: 2.92 square miles (7.6 km^{2})
- Discharge
  - location: Dutch Fork
  - average: 3.75 cu ft/s (0.106 m^{3}/s) at mouth with Buffalo Creek

Basin features
- Progression: Dutch Fork → Buffalo Creek → Ohio River → Mississippi River → Gulf of Mexico
- River system: Ohio River
- Tributaries
  - left: unnamed tributaries
  - right: unnamed tributaries
- Bridges: Beham Ridge Road, Lyons Road, Wilhelm Valley Road, Old National Pike

Bonar Creek is a 2.60 mi (4.18 km) long 1st order tributary to Dutch Fork in Washington County, Pennsylvania. This is the only stream of this name in the United States. There is a stream, called Bonar Creek, in the Province of Ontario.

== Variant names ==
According to the Geographic Names Information System, it has also been known historically as:

- Dutch Fork

== Course ==
Bonar Creek rises about 3 miles southwest of Claysville, Pennsylvania, in Washington County and then flows northwest to join Dutch Fork at Coon Island.

== Watershed ==
Bonar Creek drains 2.92 square miles (7.6 km^{2}) of area, receives about 40.7 in/year of precipitation, has a wetness index of 299.33, and is about 62% forested.

== See also ==
- List of Pennsylvania Rivers
