= Grog Run =

Grog Run is the name of two rivers or streams in the United States:

- Grog Run (Ohio)
- Grog Run (Buffalo Creek tributary), West Virginia
