= Titt Run =

Stream in West Virginia, USA

Titt Run Tributary to Buffalo Creek
- Location of Titt Run mouth Titt Run (the United States)

Location
- Country: United States
- State: West Virginia
- County: Brooke

Physical characteristics
- Source: Painters Run divide
  - location: Fowlerstown, West Virginia
  - coordinates: 40°16′41″N 080°34′02″W
  - elevation: 1,130 ft (340 m)
- Mouth: Buffalo Creek
  - location: McKinleyville, West Virginia
  - coordinates: 40°14′45″N 080°35′30″W
  - elevation: 669 ft (204 m)
- Length: 2.71 mi (4.36 km)
- Basin size: 1.59 square miles (4.1 km^{2})
- Discharge
  - location: Buffalo Creek
  - average: 1.89 cu ft/s (0.054 m^{3}/s) at mouth with Buffalo Creek

Basin features
- Progression: Buffalo Creek → Ohio River → Mississippi River → Gulf of Mexico
- River system: Ohio River
- Tributaries
  - left: unnamed tributaties
  - right: unnamed tributaries
- Bridges: none

Titt Run is a 2.71 mi (4.36 km) long 1st order tributary to Buffalo Creek in Brooke County, West Virginia. This is the only stream of this name in the United States.

== Variant names ==
According to the Palmer's Farm Map of Brooke County, WV in 1914 this stream was also known by:.

- Tiets Run

== Course ==
Titt Run rises in Fowlerstown, West Virginia, and then flows southwest to join Buffalo Creek at McKinleyville.

== Watershed ==
Titt Run drains 1.59 square miles (4.1 km^{2}) of area, receives about 40.1 in/year of precipitation, has a wetness index of 274.05, and is about 83% forested.

== See also ==
- List of rivers of West Virginia
