= Hanen Run =

Stream in Pennsylvania, USA

Hanen Run Tributary to Dunkle Run
- Location of Hanen Run mouth Hanen Run (the United States)

Location
- Country: United States
- State: Pennsylvania
- County: Washington

Physical characteristics
- Source: Haynon Creek divide
  - location: about 0.75 miles west of West Middletown, Pennsylvania
  - coordinates: 40°14′50″N 080°27′23″W
  - elevation: 1,260 ft (380 m)
- Mouth: Dunkle Run
  - location: about 1 mile northeast of Acheson, Pennsylvania
  - coordinates: 40°12′31″N 080°26′16″W
  - elevation: 935 ft (285 m)
- Length: 2.73 mi (4.39 km)
- Basin size: 4.36 square miles (11.3 km^{2})
- Discharge
  - location: Dunkle Run
  - average: 5.22 cu ft/s (0.148 m^{3}/s) at mouth with Dunkle Run

Basin features
- Progression: Dunkle Run → Brush Run → Buffalo Creek → Ohio River → Mississippi River → Gulf of Mexico
- River system: Ohio River
- Tributaries
  - left: unnamed tributaries
  - right: unnamed tributaries
- Bridges: Country Road, Raccoon Run Road, Poplar Road, Scott Lane

Hanen Run is a 2.73 mi (4.39 km) long 2nd order tributary to Dunkle Run in Washington County, Pennsylvania. This is the only stream of this name in the United States.

== Variant names ==
According to the Geographic Names Information System, it has also been known historically as:

- Hanan Run
- Haynon Run

== Course ==
Hanen Run rises about 0.75 miles west of West Middletown, Pennsylvania, in Washington County and then flows southeast to join Dunkle Run about 1 mile northeast of Acheson.

== Watershed ==
Hanen Run drains 4.36 square miles (11.3 km^{2}) of area, receives about 40.0 in/year of precipitation, has a wetness index of 315.21, and is about 43% forested.

== See also ==
- List of Pennsylvania Rivers
