= Blaine Township, Pennsylvania =

Township in Pennsylvania, US

Coordinates: 40°10′53″N 80°23′14″W

- Township
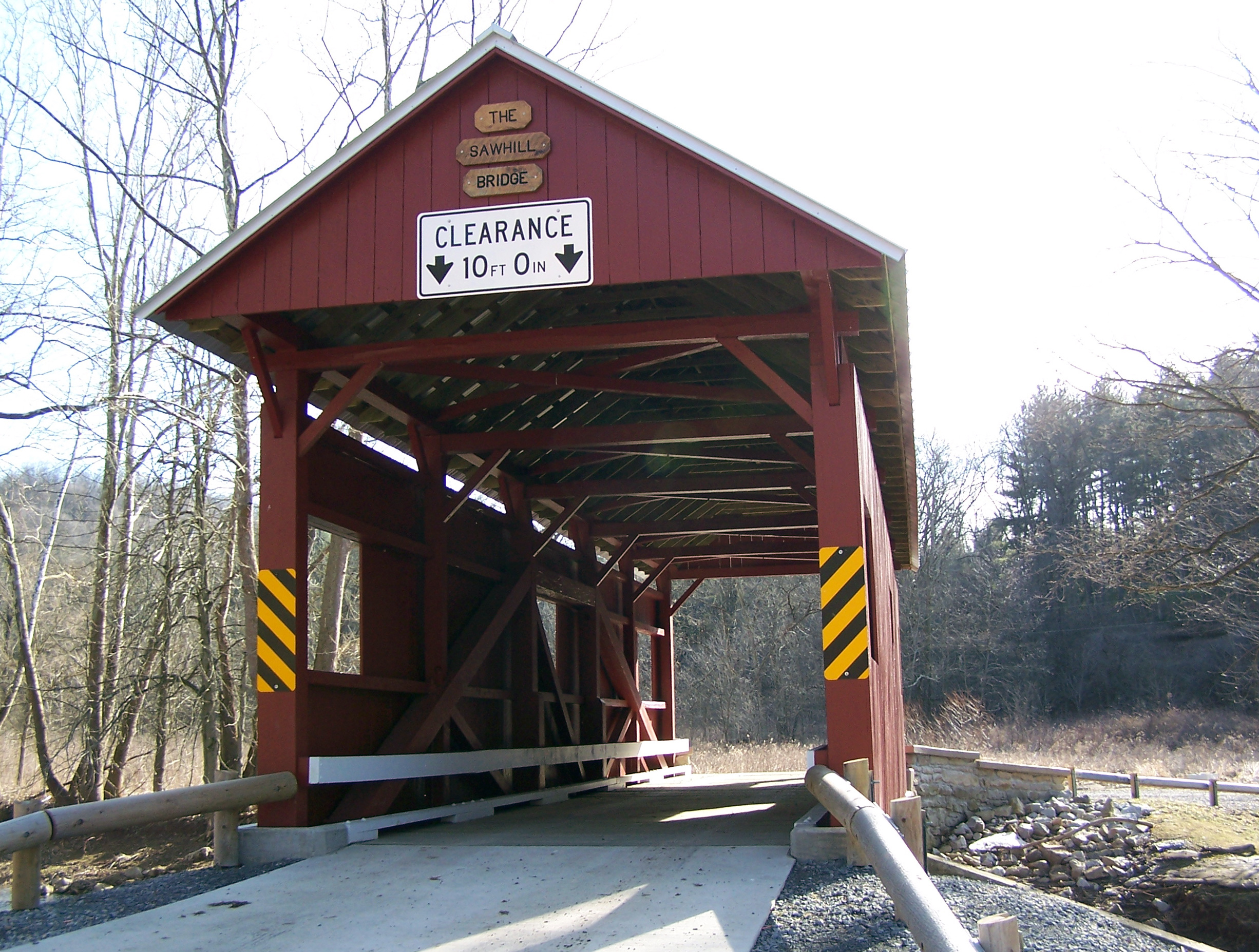
- Sawhill Covered Bridge; National Register of Historic Places
- Etymology: James G. Blaine
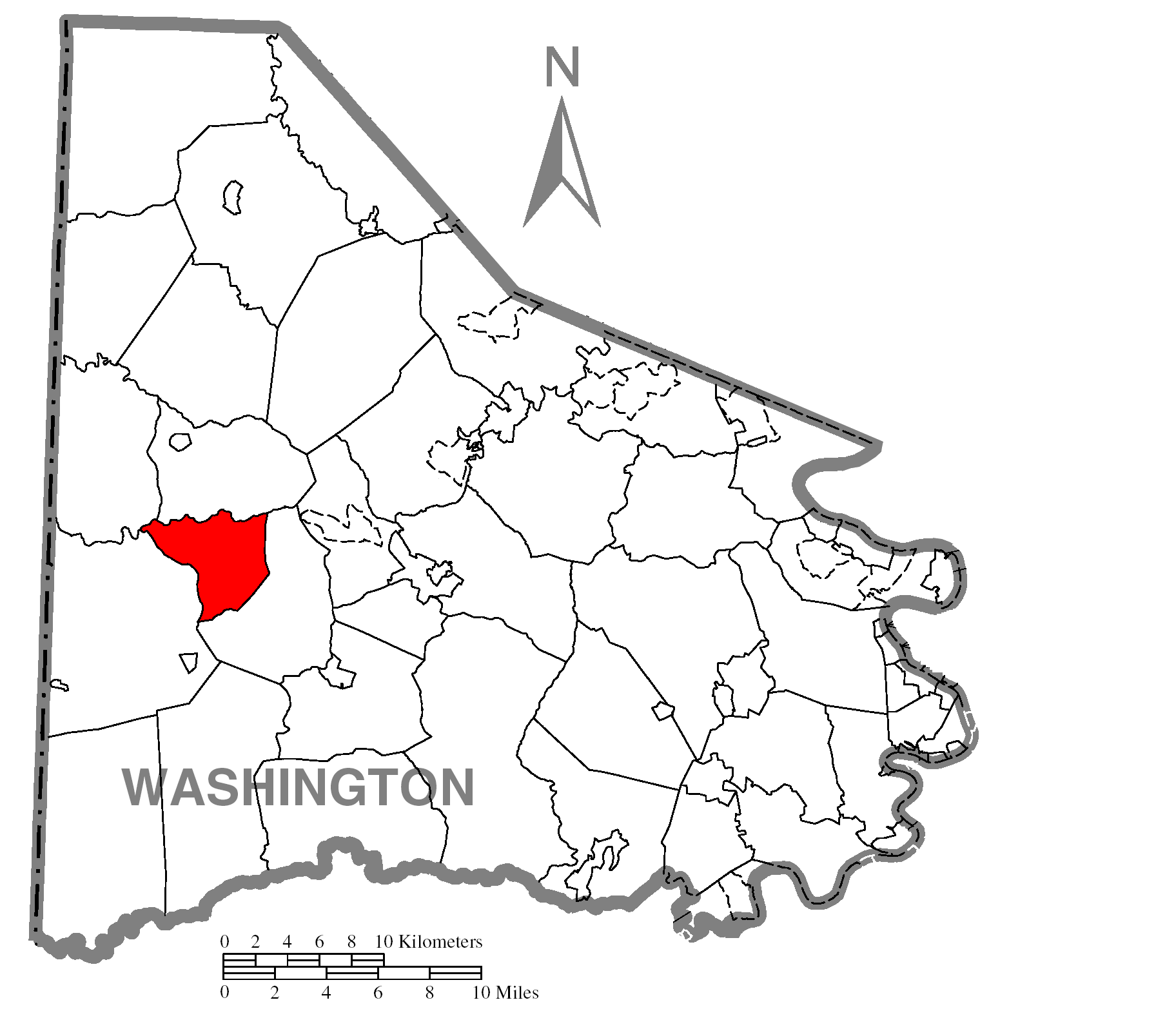
- Location of Blaine Township in Washington County

- Location of Washington County in Pennsylvania
- Country: United States
- State: Pennsylvania
- County: Washington County

Area
  - Total: 11.88 sq mi (30.78 km^{2})
  - Land: 11.88 sq mi (30.78 km^{2})
  - Water: 0 sq mi (0.00 km^{2})

Population (2020)
  - Total: 620 ▼
  - Estimate (2023): 616
  - Density: 56/sq mi (21.7/km^{2})
- Time zone: UTC-4 (EST)
  - Summer (DST): UTC-5 (EDT)
- Area code: 724
- FIPS code: 42-125-06840
- Website: blainetownship.com

Historical population
Census	Pop.	Note	%±
2000	597		—
2010	690		15.6%
2020	620		−10.1%
2025 (est.)	629		1.5%
U.S. Decennial Census

Blaine Township is a township in Washington County, Pennsylvania, United States. The population was 620 at the 2020 census.

== History ==
The Sawhill Covered Bridge and Taylorstown Historic District are listed on the National Register of Historic Places.

== Geography ==
According to the United States Census Bureau, the township has a total area of 11.9 square miles (31 km^{2}), all land. It is named after former United States Secretary of State and Republican candidate for the 1884 presidential election, James G. Blaine, a native of West Brownsville in Washington County. Taylorstown is an unincorporated community within the township.

== Demographics ==
At the 2000 census there were 597 people, 217 households, and 172 families living in the township. The population density was 50.4 inhabitants per square mile (19.5/km^{2}). There were 223 housing units at an average density of 18.8/sq mi (7.3/km^{2}). The racial makeup of the township was 98.32% White, 0.17% Asian, 0.17% from other races, and 1.34% from two or more races. Hispanic or Latino of any race were 0.34%.

Of the 217 households, 39.6% had children under the age of 18 living with them, 71.9% were married couples living together, 6.0% had a female householder with no husband present, and 20.3% were non-families. 19.4% of households were one person and 8.3% were one person aged 65 or older. The average household size was 2.75 and the average family size was 3.16.

The age distribution was 28.1% under the age of 18, 5.5% from 18 to 24, 29.0% from 25 to 44, 28.3% from 45 to 64, and 9.0% 65 or older. The median age was 39 years. For every 100 females, there were 103.8 males. For every 100 females age 18 and over, there were 99.5 males.

The median household income was $37,941 and the median family income was $39,926. Males had a median income of $32,115 versus $18,750 for females. The per capita income for the township was $15,167. About 5.1% of families and 6.2% of the population were below the poverty line, including 9.0% of those under age 18 and none of those age 65 or over.
