= Welch Run (Buffalo Creek tributary) =

Stream in Pennsylvania, USA

Welch Run Tributary to Buffalo Creek
- Location of Welch Run mouth Welch Run (Buffalo Creek tributary) (the United States)

Location
- Country: United States
- State: Pennsylvania
- County: Washington

Physical characteristics
- Source: Sugarcamp Run divide
  - location: pond about 1.5 miles northeast of Dunsfort, Pennsylvania
  - coordinates: 40°12′40″N 080°29′00″W
  - elevation: 1,120 ft (340 m)
- Mouth: Buffalo Creek
  - location: Dunsfort, Pennsylvania
  - coordinates: 40°11′19″N 080°30′13″W
  - elevation: 837 ft (255 m)
- Length: 1.75 mi (2.82 km)
- Basin size: 0.89 square miles (2.3 km^{2})
- Discharge
  - location: Buffalo Creek
  - average: 1.10 cu ft/s (0.031 m^{3}/s) at mouth with Buffalo Creek

Basin features
- Progression: Buffalo Creek → Ohio River → Mississippi River → Gulf of Mexico
- River system: Ohio River
- Tributaries
  - left: unnamed tributaries
  - right: unnamed tributaries
- Bridges: PA 331

Welch Run is a 1.75 mi (2.82 km) long 1st order tributary to Buffalo Creek in Washington County, Pennsylvania.

== Course ==
Welch Run rises in a pond about 1.5 miles northeast of Dunsfort, Pennsylvania, in Washington County and then flows southwest to join Buffalo Creek at Dunsfort.

== Watershed ==
Welch Run drains 0.89 square miles (2.3 km^{2}) of area, receives about 40.1 in/year of precipitation, has a wetness index of 288.69, and is about 88% forested.

== See also ==
- List of Pennsylvania Rivers
