= McGuffey =

McGuffey may refer to:

- William Holmes McGuffey, American writer
- The McGuffey Readers, written by William Holmes McGuffey
- McGuffey, Ohio, a town in the United States
- McGuffey School District, a school district in Western Pennsylvania, United States
