= Taylorstown Historic District =

Taylorstown Historic District may refer to:

- Taylorstown Historic District (Taylorstown, Pennsylvania), listed on the National Register of Historic Places in Washington County, Pennsylvania
- Taylorstown Historic District (Taylorstown, Virginia), listed on the National Register of Historic Places in Loudoun County, Virginia

== See also ==
- Taylorsville Historic District Taylorsville, Kentucky, listed on the National Register of Historic Places in Spencer County, Kentucky
