= Buck Run =

Buck Run may refer to:

- Buck Run (Little Muncy Creek tributary), in Lycoming County, Pennsylvania
- Buck Run (West Branch Brandywine Creek tributary) in Chester County, Pennsylvania
- Buck Run (West Branch Conococheague Creek tributary) in Franklin County, Pennsylvania
- Buck Run, in Schuylkill County, Pennsylvania
- Buck Run (Buffalo Creek tributary), in Washington County, Pennsylvania
