= McGuffey High School =

Coordinates: 40.141304°N 80.363313°W

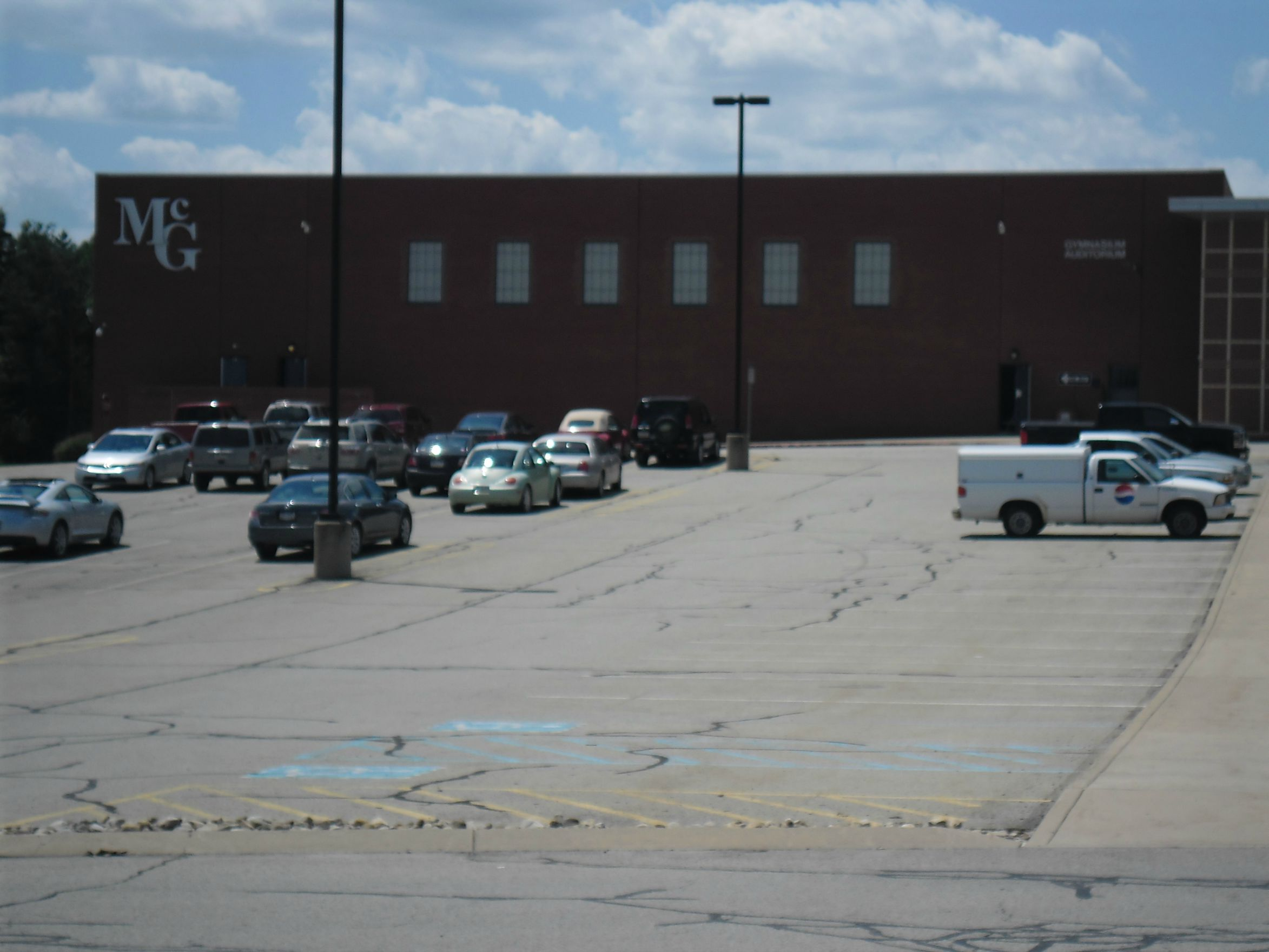
- 86 McGuffey Dr, Claysville, PA 15323; United States

Information
- Type: Public
- School district: McGuffey School District
- Principal: Mark Bonus
- Grades: 9-12
- Colors: Navy Blue and Gold
- Athletics conference: WPIAL, PIAA
- Mascot: Highlander
- Website: McGuffey High School official website

McGuffey High School is one of four schools that make up the McGuffey School District in rural Claysville, Pennsylvania, located approximately 30 miles southwest of Pittsburgh. The school's official colors are navy blue and gold and "Highlanders" has been adopted as the official school nickname. The McGuffey High School building is jointly used by McGuffey Middle School. The school and the district are named for William Holmes McGuffey, author of the McGuffey Reader, who was born within the district boundaries.
