= Dunkle Run =

Stream in Pennsylvania, USA

Dunkle Run Tributary to Brush Run
- Location of Dunkle Run mouth Dunkle Run (the United States)

Location
- Country: United States
- State: Pennsylvania
- County: Washington

Physical characteristics
- Source: Cross Creek divide
  - location: about 1 mile northwest of Buffalo, Pennsylvania
  - coordinates: 40°14′14″N 080°22′45″W
  - elevation: 1,240 ft (380 m)
- Mouth: Brush Run
  - location: about 0.5 miles northeast of Acheson, Pennsylvania
  - coordinates: 40°11′56″N 080°26′27″W
  - elevation: 909 ft (277 m)
- Length: 4.57 mi (7.35 km)
- Basin size: 7.75 square miles (20.1 km^{2})
- Discharge
  - location: Brush Run
  - average: 9.12 cu ft/s (0.258 m^{3}/s) at mouth with Brush Run

Basin features
- Progression: Brush Run → Buffalo Creek → Ohio River → Mississippi River → Gulf of Mexico
- River system: Ohio River
- Tributaries
  - left: unnamed tributaries
  - right: Hanen Run
- Bridges: PA 844, Farrar School Road, Old Trail Road, Fox Road, PA 331

Dunkle Run is a 4.57 mi (7.35 km) long 2nd order tributary to Brush Run in Washington County, Pennsylvania, United States.

== Variant names ==
According to the Geographic Names Information System, it has also been known historically as:

- Dunkie Run

== Course ==
Dunkle Run rises about 1 mile northwest of Buffalo, Pennsylvania, in Washington County and then flows southwest to join Brush Run about 0.5 miles northeast of Acheson.

== Watershed ==
Dunkle Run drains 7.75 square miles (20.1 km^{2}) of area, receives about 40.0 in/year of precipitation, has a wetness index of 318.15, and is about 45% forested.

== See also ==
- List of Pennsylvania Rivers
