= Wolf Run (Buffalo Creek tributary) =

Stream in Pennsylvania, USA

Wolf Run Tributary to Buffalo Creek
- Location of Wolf Run mouth Wolf Run (Buffalo Creek tributary) (the United States)

Location
- Country: United States
- State: Pennsylvania
- County: Washington

Physical characteristics
- Source: unnamed tributary to Chartiers Creek divide
  - location: about 2 miles west of Wolfdale, Pennsylvania
  - coordinates: 40°12′02″N 080°20′02″W
  - elevation: 1,280 ft (390 m)
- Mouth: Buffalo Creek
  - location: Taylorstown, Pennsylvania
  - coordinates: 40°09′38″N 080°22′35″W
  - elevation: 981 ft (299 m)
- Length: 3.61 mi (5.81 km)
- Basin size: 2.92 square miles (7.6 km^{2})
- Discharge
  - location: Buffalo Creek
  - average: 3.53 cu ft/s (0.100 m^{3}/s) at mouth with Buffalo Creek

Basin features
- Progression: Buffalo Creek → Ohio River → Mississippi River → Gulf of Mexico
- River system: Ohio River
- Tributaries
  - left: unnamed tributaries
  - right: unnamed tributaries
- Bridges: Rural Valley Road (x2), Clarke Road, Rural Valley Road

Wolf Run is a 3.61 mi (5.81 km) long 2nd order tributary to Buffalo Creek in Washington County, Pennsylvania.

== Variant names ==
According to the Geographic Names Information System, it has also been known historically as:

- Pleasant Run

== Course ==
Wolf Run rises about 2 miles west of Wolfdale, Pennsylvania, in Washington County and then flows southwest to join Buffalo Creek at Taylorstown.

== Watershed ==
Wolf Run drains 2.92 square miles (7.6 km^{2}) of area, receives about 39.8 in/year of precipitation, has a wetness index of 328.10, and is about 45% forested.

== See also ==
- List of Pennsylvania Rivers
