= Green Hills, Pennsylvania =

Borough in Pennsylvania, US

Green Hills
- Borough
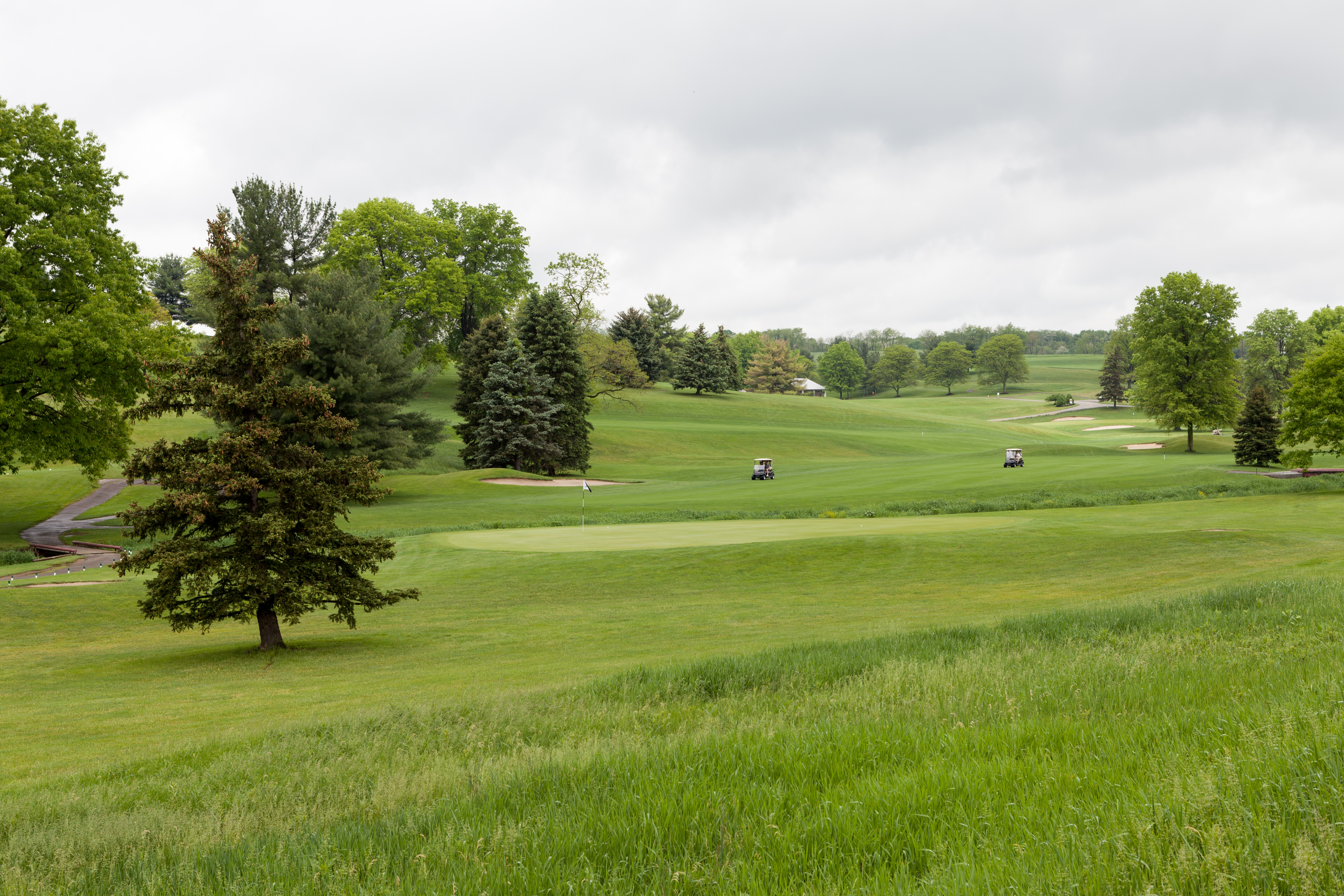
- Lone Pine Country Club

- Location of Green Hills in Washington County, Pennsylvania.

- Location of Green Hills in Pennsylvania
- Coordinates: 40°6′48″N 80°17′58″W
- Country: United States
- State: Pennsylvania
- County: Washington

Government
  - Mayor: Terry D. George

Area
  - Total: 0.94 sq mi (2.43 km^{2})
  - Land: 0.92 sq mi (2.39 km^{2})
  - Water: 0.015 sq mi (0.04 km^{2})

Population (2020)
  - Total: 20
  - Density: 21.7/sq mi (8.37/km^{2})
- Time zone: UTC-5 (EST)
  - Summer (DST): UTC-4 (EDT)
- Area code: 724
- FIPS code: 42-31082

Green Hills is a borough in Washington County, Pennsylvania, United States. As of the 2020 census, Green Hills had a population of 20.

== History ==
The borough was formed in 1978 when a local businessman worked to secede from the dry township of South Franklin after voters there defeated a referendum that would allow alcohol sales at his country club. The population was twenty at the time of the 2020 census, making it the third least populous borough in the state; only S.N.P.J. and Centralia had fewer residents.

Pennsylvania law has since been changed to require at least five hundred residents in a newly formed borough.

== Geography ==
Green Hills is located at 40°6′48″N 80°17′58″W (40.113382, -80.299368).

According to the United States Census Bureau, the borough has a total area of 0.9 square miles (2.3 km^{2}), of which 0.9 square miles (2.3 km^{2}) is land and 1.08% is water.

== Surrounding neighborhoods ==
Green Hills is mostly bordered by South Franklin Township; its only other border is with Buffalo Township to the northwest.

== Demographics ==
Historical population
Census	Pop.	Note	%±
1980	18		—
1990	21		16.7%
2000	18		−14.3%
2010	29		61.1%
2020	20		−31.0%
2025 (est.)	17	Steady	−15.0%

As of the census of 2000, there were eighteen people, seven households, and four families residing in the borough. The population density was 19.5 people per square mile (7.5 people/km^{2}).

There were eight housing units at an average density of 8.7 per square mile (3.4/km^{2}). The racial makeup of the borough was 100.00% White.

There were seven households, out of which three had children under the age of eighteen living with them. Five were married couples living together, and two were non-families.

Two households were made up of individuals, and none had someone living alone who was sixty-five years of age or older. The average household size was 2.57 and the average family size was 3.20.

The median age in the borough was thirty-six years. Among the eighteen residents, there were six children — four girls and two boys — six men, and six women. Of the adults, two were between the ages of eighteen and twenty-four, four were aged twenty-five to forty-four, three were aged forty-five to sixty-four, and three were sixty-five years of age or older.

The median income for a household in the borough was $94,239, and the median income for a family was $116,250. Males had a median income of $24,583 compared with $0 for females. The per capita income for the borough was $124,279.

No individuals or families were documented as falling below the poverty line.

== Education ==
It is in the McGuffey School District.

== Gallery ==
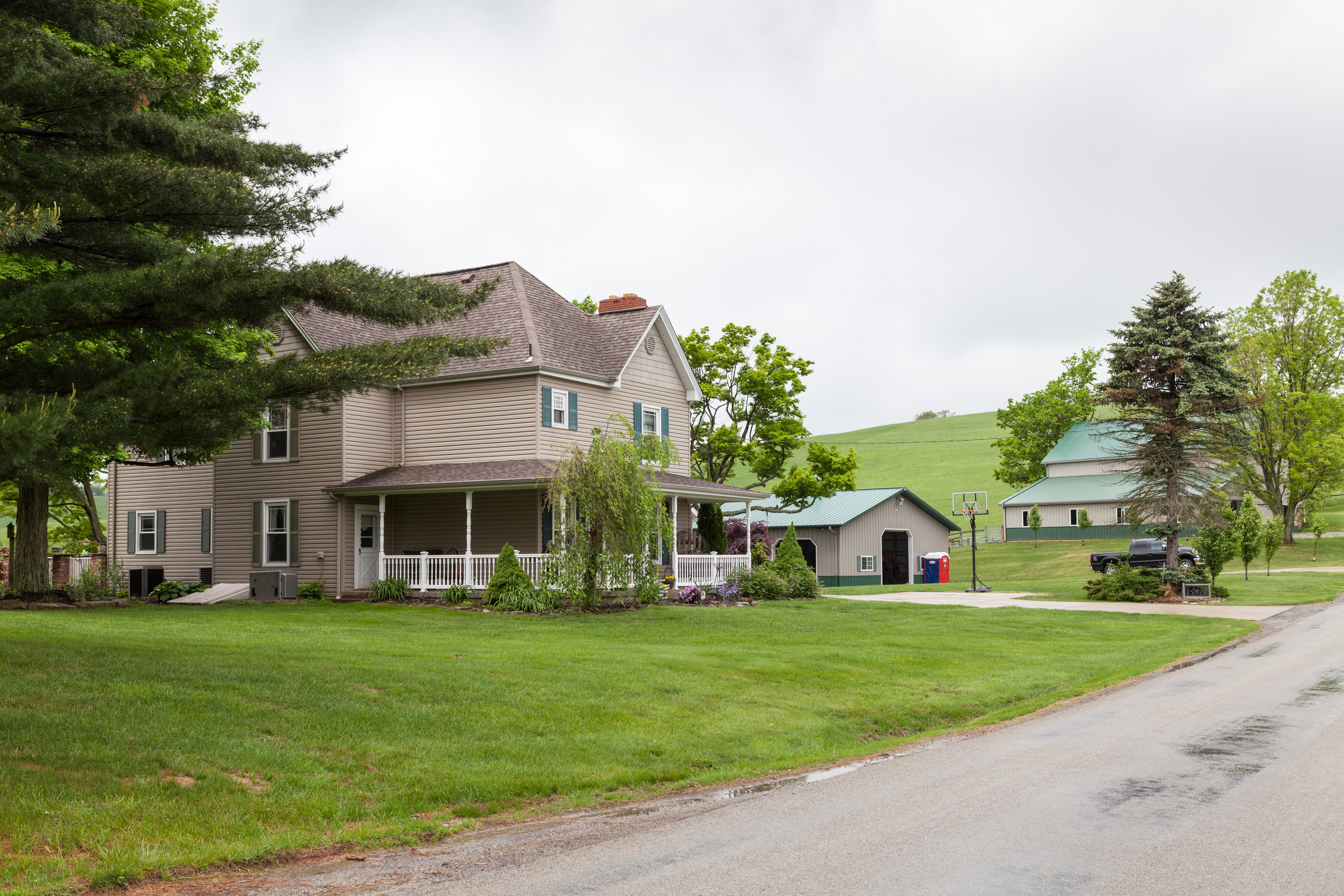
A house in the borough
