= Longs Run =

Stream in West Virginia, USA

Longs Run Tributary to Buffalo Creek
- Location of Longs Run mouth Longs Run (the United States)

Location
- Country: United States
- State: West Virginia
- County: Brooke; Ohio

Physical characteristics
- Source: McGraw Run divide
  - location: about 2 miles south-southeast of West Liberty, West Virginia
  - coordinates: 40°08′25″N 080°34′45″W
  - elevation: 1,195 ft (364 m)
- Mouth: Castleman Run
  - location: about 2 miles south-southeast of Bethany, West Virginia
  - coordinates: 40°10′35″N 080°32′26″W
  - elevation: 879 ft (268 m)
- Length: 3.88 mi (6.24 km)
- Basin size: 4.94 square miles (12.8 km^{2})
- Discharge
  - location: Castleman Run
  - average: 6.06 cu ft/s (0.172 m^{3}/s) at mouth with Castleman Run

Basin features
- Progression: Castleman Run → Buffalo Creek → Ohio River → Mississippi River → Gulf of Mexico
- River system: Ohio River
- Tributaries
  - left: unnamed tributaries
  - right: unnamed tributaries
- Bridges: WV 37, Long Run Road, WV 53, Castleman Run Road

Longs Run is a 3.88 mi (6.24 km) long 2nd order tributary to Castleman Run in Brooke County, West Virginia.

== Course ==
Longs Run rises about 2 miles south-southeast of West Liberty, West Virginia, in Ohio County and then flows northeasterly into Brooke County to join Castleman Run about 2 miles south-southeast of Bethany, West Virginia.

== Watershed ==
Longs Run drains 4.94 square miles (12.8 km^{2}) of area, receives about 40.5 in/year of precipitation, has a wetness index of 293.77, and is about 60% forested.

== See also ==
- List of rivers of West Virginia
