= Greens Run (Buffalo Creek tributary) =

Stream in West Virginia, USA

Greens Run Tributary to Buffalo Creek
- Location of Greens Run mouth Greens Run (Buffalo Creek tributary) (the United States)

Location
- Country: United States
- State: West Virginia
- County: Brooke

Physical characteristics
- Source: Spring Run divide
  - location: about 0.5 miles north-northwest of Pettit Heights, West Virginia
  - coordinates: 40°14′09″N 080°38′05″W
  - elevation: 1.140 ft (0.347 m)
- Mouth: Buffalo Creek
  - location: about 0.25 miles south of Marshall Heights, West Virginia
  - coordinates: 40°15′07″N 080°36′16″W
  - elevation: 658 ft (201 m)
- Length: 2.01 mi (3.23 km)
- Basin size: 1.46 square miles (3.8 km^{2})
- Discharge
  - location: Buffalo Creek
  - average: 1.72 cu ft/s (0.049 m^{3}/s) at mouth with Buffalo Creek

Basin features
- Progression: Buffalo Creek → Ohio River → Mississippi River → Gulf of Mexico
- River system: Ohio River
- Tributaries
  - left: unnamed tributaties
  - right: unnamed tributaries
- Bridges: Greens Run Road

Greens Run is a 2.01 mi (3.23 km) long 2nd order tributary to Buffalo Creek in Brooke County, West Virginia.

== Course ==
Greens Run rises about 0.5 miles north-northwest of Pettit Heights, West Virginia, and then flows northeast to join Buffalo Creek about 0.25 miles south of Marshall Terrace.

== Watershed ==
Greens Run drains 1.46 square miles (3.8 km^{2}) of area, receives about 39.9 in/year of precipitation, has a wetness index of 280.76, and is about 85% forested.

== See also ==
- List of rivers of West Virginia
