= McGuffey School District =

School district in Pennsylvania

Coordinates: 40.14282°N 80.36458°W

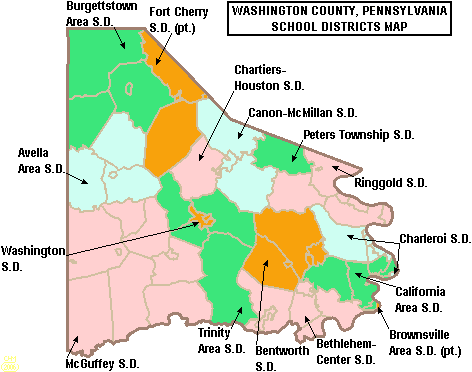

Address
- 90 McGuffey Drive Claysville, Pennsylvania, 15323; United States

District information
- Type: Public

Students and staff
- Athletic conference: WPIAL
- District mascot: Highlander
- Colors: Navy and gold

McGuffey School District is a rural, public school system located in Washington County, Pennsylvania. It serves 10 communities, including the boroughs of Claysville and Green Hills, and the townships of West Finley, East Finley, Morris, Donegal, Buffalo, Blaine, and South Franklin. McGuffey School District encompasses approximately 203 square miles. According to 2000 federal census data, it serves a resident population of 13,695 people.

The district name honors educator William Holmes McGuffey, who was born in West Finley Township.

== Schools ==
The school district is composed of four schools:

- McGuffey High School (9–12)
- McGuffey Middle School 6–8)
- Claysville Elementary (K–5)
- Joe Walker Elementary (K–5)
