= Camp Run (Buffalo Creek tributary) =

Stream in West Virginia, United States

Camp Run Tributary to Buffalo Creek
- Location of Camp Run mouth Camp Run (Buffalo Creek tributary) (the United States)

Location
- Country: United States
- State: West Virginia; Pennsylvania
- Counties: Brooke; Washington

Physical characteristics
- Source: Cross Creek divide
  - location: pond about 1 mile south of Independence, Pennsylvania
  - coordinates: 40°14′46″N 080°30′43″W
  - elevation: 1,125 ft (343 m)
- Mouth: Buffalo Creek
  - location: about 1 mile east of Bethany, West Virginia
  - coordinates: 40°12′12″N 080°31′58″W
  - elevation: 814 ft (248 m)
- Length: 3.15 mi (5.07 km)
- Basin size: 2.88 square miles (7.5 km^{2})
- Discharge
  - location: Buffalo Creek
  - average: 3.43 cu ft/s (0.097 m^{3}/s) at mouth with Buffalo Creek

Basin features
- Progression: Buffalo Creek → Ohio River → Mississippi River → Gulf of Mexico
- River system: Ohio River
- Tributaries
  - left: unnamed tributaries
  - right: unnamed tributaries
- Bridges: Camp Ground Road (x3), Sugar Run Road, Camp Run Road (WV 26)

Camp Run is a 3.15 mi (5.07 km) long 1st order tributary to Buffalo Creek in Brooke County, West Virginia.

== Variant names ==
According to the Geographic Names Information System, it has also been known historically as:

- Wells Run

== Course ==
Camp Run rises about 1 mile south of Independence, Pennsylvania, in Washington County and then flows southwesterly into Brooke County to join Buffalo Creek about 1 miles east of Bethany, West Virginia.

== Watershed ==
Camp Run drains 2.88 square miles (7.5 km^{2}) of area, receives about 39.7 in/year of precipitation, has a wetness index of 324.80, and is about 51% forested.

== See also ==
- List of rivers of West Virginia
