= Painters Run (Buffalo Creek tributary) =

Stream in West Virginia, USA

Painters Run Tributary to Buffalo Creek
- Location of Painters Run mouth Painters Run (Buffalo Creek tributary) (the United States)

Location
- Country: United States
- State: West Virginia
- County: Brooke

Physical characteristics
- Source: Potrock Run divide
  - location: about 1.5 miles west of Fowlerstown, West Virginia
  - coordinates: 40°17′29″N 080°33′43″W
  - elevation: 980 ft (300 m)
- Mouth: Buffalo Creek
  - location: Marshall Terrace, West Virginia
  - coordinates: 40°15′32″N 080°36′01″W
  - elevation: 658 ft (201 m)
- Length: 2.65 mi (4.26 km)
- Basin size: 3.03 square miles (7.8 km^{2})
- Discharge
  - location: Buffalo Creek
  - average: 3.49 cu ft/s (0.099 m^{3}/s) at mouth with Buffalo Creek

Basin features
- Progression: Buffalo Creek → Ohio River → Mississippi River → Gulf of Mexico
- River system: Ohio River
- Tributaries
  - left: unnamed tributaties
  - right: unnamed tributaries
- Bridges: WV 27

Painters Run is a 2.65 mi (4.26 km) long 1st order tributary to Buffalo Creek in Brooke County, West Virginia.

== Variant names ==
According to the Palmer's Farm Map of Brooke County, WV in 1914 this stream was also known by:.

- Panther Run

== Course ==
Painters Run rises about 1.5 miles west of Fowlerstown, West Virginia, and then flows southwest to join Buffalo Creek at Marshall Terrace.

== Watershed ==
Painters Run drains 3.03 square miles (7.8 km^{2}) of area, receives about 40.0 in/year of precipitation, has a wetness index of 287.70, and is about 71% forested.

== See also ==
- List of rivers of West Virginia
