= Pierce Run =

Stream in West Virginia, USA

Pierce Run Tributary to Buffalo Creek
- Location of Pierce Run mouth Pierce Run (the United States)

Location
- Country: United States
- State: West Virginia
- County: Brooke

Physical characteristics
- Source: Cross Creek divide
  - location: Franklin, West Virginia
  - coordinates: 40°16′31″N 080°33′08″W
  - elevation: 1,120 ft (340 m)
- Mouth: Buffalo Creek
  - location: about 0.25 miles southeast of McKinleyville, West Virginia
  - coordinates: 40°14′19″N 080°35′13″W
  - elevation: 689 ft (210 m)
- Length: 4.21 mi (6.78 km)
- Basin size: 5.07 square miles (13.1 km^{2})
- Discharge
  - location: Buffalo Creek
  - average: 6.60 cu ft/s (0.187 m^{3}/s) at mouth with Buffalo Creek

Basin features
- Progression: Buffalo Creek → Ohio River → Mississippi River → Gulf of Mexico
- River system: Ohio River
- Tributaries
  - left: unnamed tributaties
  - right: unnamed tributaries
- Bridges: WV 20 (x4)

Pierce Run is a 4.21 mi (6.78 km) long 2nd order tributary to Buffalo Creek in Brooke County, West Virginia.

== Variant names ==
According to the Geographic Names Information System, it has also been known historically as:

- Pierces Run

== Course ==
Pierce Run rises in Franklin, West Virginia, and then flows south and southwest to join Buffalo Creek about 0.25 miles southeast of McKinleyville.

== Watershed ==
Pierce Run drains 5.07 square miles (13.1 km^{2}) of area, receives about 40.1 in/year of precipitation, has a wetness index of 299.07, and is about 74% forested.

== See also ==
- List of rivers of West Virginia
