= Inn at Fowlerstown =

- U.S. National Register of Historic Places
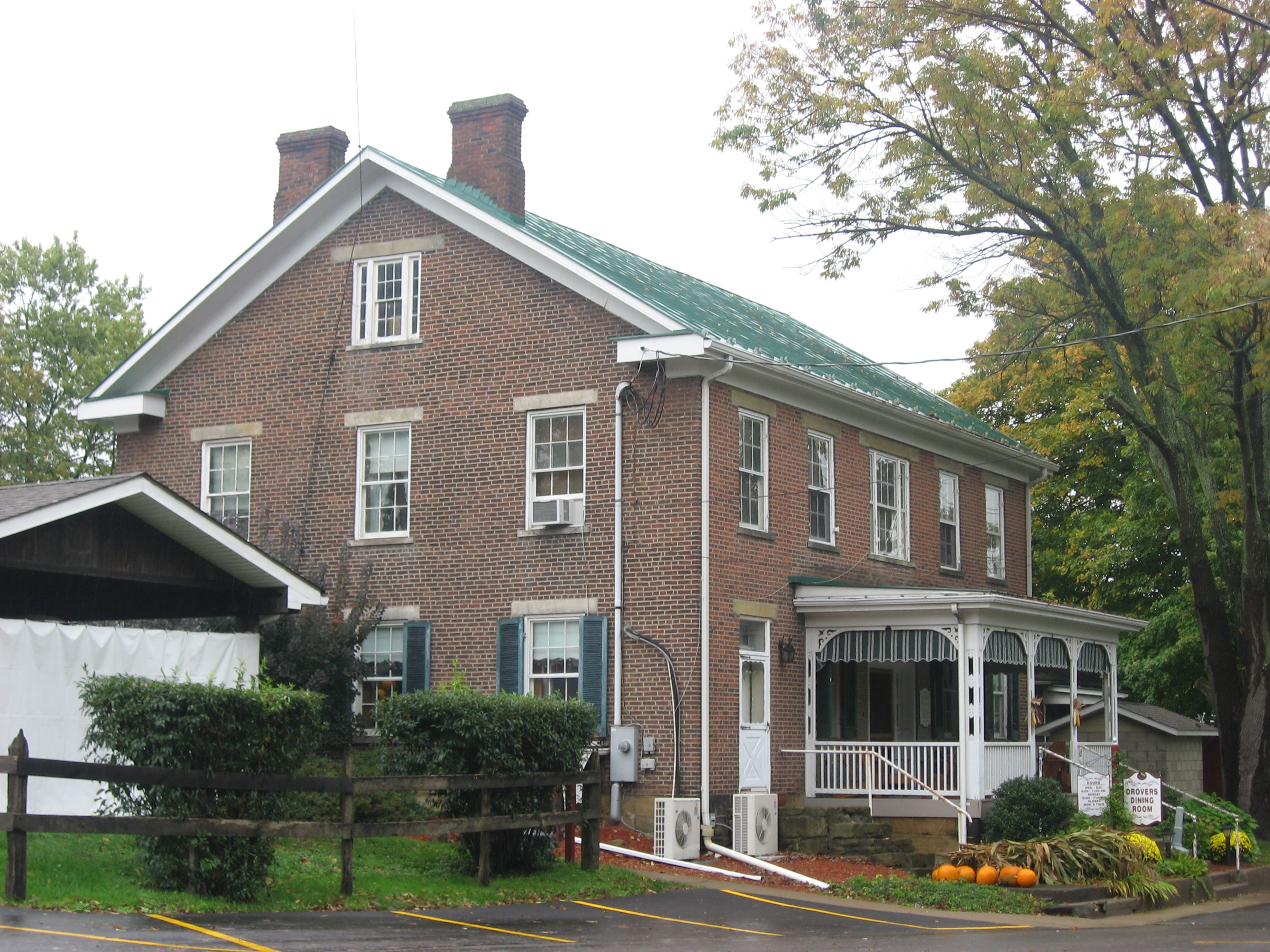
- Front and side of the inn

- Location within West Virginia Location within the United States
- Location: 1001 Washington Pike (West Virginia Route 27), near Wellsburg, West Virginia
- Coordinates: 40°16′47″N 80°33′18″W
- Area: 4 acres (1.6 ha)
- Built: 1851
- Architectural style: Greek Revival
- NRHP reference No.: 92001483
- Added to NRHP: October 29, 1992

Inn at Fowlerstown, also known as Drover’s Inn, is a historic hotel located near Wellsburg in Brooke County, West Virginia, United States. The inn was built between 1848 and 1851, and is a 2½-story brick building in the Greek Revival style. The property also includes a two-story log house (1820) and frame cottage that pre-date the inn. Contributing outbuildings are a small clapboard well house, chicken coop, and privy. Before 1938, the inn housed a general store and post office that served the small village of Fowlerstown. The village grew up around along Washington Pike at the grist mill established by William Fowler.

It was listed on the National Register of Historic Places in 1992.
