= Stotts Run =

Stream in West Virginia, USA

Stotts Run Tributary to Buffalo Creek
- Location of Stotts Run mouth Stotts Run (the United States)

Location
- Country: United States
- State: West Virginia
- County: Brooke

Physical characteristics
- Source: North Fork Short Creek divide
  - location: pond about 1.5 miles north of West Liberty, West Virginia
  - coordinates: 40°11′07″N 080°36′21″W
  - elevation: 1,150 ft (350 m)
- Mouth: Buffalo Creek
  - location: about 1 mile west of Bethany, West Virginia
  - coordinates: 40°11′53″N 080°35′02″W
  - elevation: 764 ft (233 m)
- Length: 1.77 mi (2.85 km)
- Basin size: 1.90 square miles (4.9 km^{2})
- Discharge
  - location: Buffalo Creek
  - average: 2.03 cu ft/s (0.057 m^{3}/s) at mouth with Buffalo Creek

Basin features
- Progression: Buffalo Creek → Ohio River → Mississippi River → Gulf of Mexico
- River system: Ohio River
- Tributaries
  - left: unnamed tributaties
  - right: unnamed tributaries
- Bridges: none

Stotts Run is a 1.77 mi (2.85 km) long 2nd order tributary to Buffalo Creek in Brooke County, West Virginia. This is the only stream of this name in the United States.

== Variant names ==
According to the Geographic Names Information System, it has also been known historically as:

- Scott Run
- Scotts Run

== Course ==
Stotts Run rises about 1.5 miles north of West Liberty, West Virginia, and then flows east and northeast to join Buffalo Creek about 1 mile west of Bethany.

== Watershed ==
Stotts Run drains 1.90 square miles (4.9 km^{2}) of area, receives about 40.3 in/year of precipitation, has a wetness index of 288.24, and is about 72% forested.

== See also ==
- List of rivers of West Virginia
