= Hogtan Run =

Stream in West Virginia, USA

Hogtan Run Tributary to Buffalo Creek
- Location of Hogtan Run mouth Hogtan Run (the United States)

Location
- Country: United States
- State: West Virginia
- County: Brooke

Physical characteristics
- Source: Girty Run divide
  - location: about 3 miles east of Windsor Heights, West Virginia
  - coordinates: 40°11′45″N 080°37′26″W
  - elevation: 1,100 ft (340 m)
- Mouth: Buffalo Creek
  - location: about 2 miles west of Bethany, West Virginia
  - coordinates: 40°12′17″N 080°35′58″W
  - elevation: 741 ft (226 m)
- Length: 1.80 mi (2.90 km)
- Basin size: 1.67 square miles (4.3 km^{2})
- Discharge
  - location: Buffalo Creek
  - average: 2.03 cu ft/s (0.057 m^{3}/s) at mouth with Buffalo Creek

Basin features
- Progression: Buffalo Creek → Ohio River → Mississippi River → Gulf of Mexico
- River system: Ohio River
- Tributaries
  - left: unnamed tributaties
  - right: unnamed tributaries
- Bridges: Hoagland Run Road, WV 30/1

Hogtan Run is a 1.80 mi (2.90 km) long 1st order tributary to Buffalo Creek in Brooke County, West Virginia. This is the only stream of this name in the United States.

== Variant names ==
According to the Palmer's Farmer Map of Brooke County, West Virginia, this stream is also known as

- Hogelands Run

== Course ==
Hogtan Run rises about 3 miles east of Windsor Heights, West Virginia, and then flows east and northeast to join Buffalo Creek about 2 miles west of Bethany.

== Watershed ==
Hogtan Run drains 1.69 square miles (4.4 km^{2}) of area, receives about 40.2 in/year of precipitation, has a wetness index of 295.41, and is about 66% forested.

== See also ==
- List of rivers of West Virginia
