= Hukill Run =

Stream in West Virginia, US

Hukill Run Tributary to Buffalo Creek
- Location of Hukill Run mouth Hukill Run (the United States)

Location
- Country: United States
- State: West Virginia
- County: Brooke

Physical characteristics
- Source: unnamed tributary to Ohio River divide
  - location: about 2 miles east-southeast of Power, West Virginia
  - coordinates: 40°12′26″N 080°37′48″W
  - elevation: 1,118 ft (341 m)
- Mouth: Buffalo Creek
  - location: about 2 miles west-northwest of Bethany, West Virginia
  - coordinates: 40°12′47″N 080°35′45″W
  - elevation: 739 ft (225 m)
- Length: 2.12 mi (3.41 km)
- Basin size: 1.38 square miles (3.6 km^{2})
- Discharge
  - location: Buffalo Creek
  - average: 1.67 cu ft/s (0.047 m^{3}/s) at mouth with Buffalo Creek

Basin features
- Progression: Buffalo Creek → Ohio River → Mississippi River → Gulf of Mexico
- River system: Ohio River
- Tributaries
  - left: unnamed tributaties
  - right: unnamed tributaries
- Bridges: WV 30 (x2), Paw Paw Ridge Lane, WV 30

Hukill Run is a 2.12 mi (3.41 km) long 1st order tributary to Buffalo Creek in Brooke County, West Virginia. It is likely named for the landowner that owns the confluence of this run and Buffalo Creek.

== Course ==
Hukill Run rises about 2 miles east of Power, West Virginia, and then flows east to join Buffalo Creek about 2 miles west-northwest of Bethany.

== Watershed ==
Hukill Run drains 1.38 square miles (3.6 km^{2}) of area, receives about 40.1 in/year of precipitation, has a wetness index of 293.62, and is about 68% forested.

== See also ==
- List of rivers of West Virginia
