= Mingo Run (Buffalo Creek tributary) =

Stream in West Virginia, USA

Mingo Run Tributary to Buffalo Creek
- Location of Mingo Run mouth Mingo Run (Buffalo Creek tributary) (the United States)

Location
- Country: United States
- State: West Virginia
- County: Brooke

Physical characteristics
- Source: unnamed tributary to Cross Creek divide
  - location: pond about 0.5 miles west of Independence, Pennsylvania
  - coordinates: 40°15′06″N 080°31′20″W
  - elevation: 1,160 ft (350 m)
- Mouth: Buffalo Creek
  - location: about 2 miles northwest of Bethany, West Virginia
  - coordinates: 40°13′16″N 080°35′29″W
  - elevation: 738 ft (225 m)
- Length: 4.83 mi (7.77 km)
- Basin size: 4.51 square miles (11.7 km^{2})
- Discharge
  - location: Buffalo Creek
  - average: 5.26 cu ft/s (0.149 m^{3}/s) at mouth with Buffalo Creek

Basin features
- Progression: Buffalo Creek → Ohio River → Mississippi River → Gulf of Mexico
- River system: Ohio River
- Tributaries
  - left: unnamed tributaties
  - right: Ferry Run
- Bridges: WV 88, WV 24

Mingo Run is a 4.83 mi (7.77 km) long 2nd order tributary to Buffalo Creek in Brooke County, West Virginia.

== Course ==
Mingo Run rises in a pond about 0.5 miles west of Independence, West Virginia, and then flows southwesterly to join Buffalo Creek about 2 miles northwest of Bethany.

== Watershed ==
Mingo Run drains 4.51 square miles (11.7 km^{2}) of area, receives about 40.1 in/year of precipitation, has a wetness index of 319.38, and is about 55% forested.

== See also ==
- List of rivers of West Virginia
