= Logan Run (Buffalo Creek tributary) =

Stream in West Virginia, USA

Logan Run Tributary to Buffalo Creek
- Location of Logan Run mouth Logan Run (Buffalo Creek tributary) (the United States)

Location
- Country: United States
- State: West Virginia
- County: Brooke

Physical characteristics
- Source: North Fork Short Creek divide
  - location: about 1 mile northeast of West Liberty, West Virginia
  - coordinates: 40°10′30″N 080°34′39″W
  - elevation: 1,080 ft (330 m)
- Mouth: Buffalo Creek
  - location: about 0.25 miles southwest of Bethany, West Virginia
  - coordinates: 40°11′46″N 080°33′49″W
  - elevation: 781 ft (238 m)
- Length: 1.40 mi (2.25 km)
- Basin size: 0.98 square miles (2.5 km^{2})
- Discharge
  - location: Buffalo Creek
  - average: 1.21 cu ft/s (0.034 m^{3}/s) at mouth with Buffalo Creek

Basin features
- Progression: Buffalo Creek → Ohio River → Mississippi River → Gulf of Mexico
- River system: Ohio River
- Tributaries
  - left: unnamed tributaties
  - right: unnamed tributaries
- Bridges: none

Logan Run is a 1.40 mi (2.25 km) long 1st order tributary to Buffalo Creek in Brooke County, West Virginia.

== Course ==
Logan Run rises about 1 mile northeast of West Liberty, West Virginia, and then flows northeast to join Buffalo Creek about 0.25 miles southwest of Bethany.

== Watershed ==
Logan Run drains 0.98 square miles (2.5 km^{2}) of area, receives about 40.2 in/year of precipitation, has a wetness index of 291.52, and is about 45% forested.

== See also ==
- List of rivers of West Virginia
