= Buck Run (Buffalo Creek tributary) =

Stream in Pennsylvania, USA

Buck Run Tributary to Buffalo Creek
- Location of Buck Run mouth Buck Run (Buffalo Creek tributary) (the United States)

Location
- Country: United States
- State: Pennsylvania
- County: Washington

Physical characteristics
- Source: Dutch Fork divide
  - location: about 0.5 miles south of Donley, Pennsylvania
  - coordinates: 40°08′15″N 080°25′35″W
  - elevation: 1,170 ft (360 m)
- Mouth: Buffalo Creek
  - location: Acheson, Pennsylvania
  - coordinates: 40°11′29″N 080°26′57″W
  - elevation: 886 ft (270 m)
- Length: 4.37 mi (7.03 km)
- Basin size: 5.74 square miles (14.9 km^{2})
- Discharge
  - location: Buffalo Creek
  - average: 6.95 cu ft/s (0.197 m^{3}/s) at mouth with Buffalo Creek

Basin features
- Progression: Buffalo Creek → Ohio River → Mississippi River → Gulf of Mexico
- River system: Ohio River
- Tributaries
  - left: unnamed tributaries
  - right: unnamed tributaries
- Bridges: Crane Road, Ramage Road, PA 231

Buck Run is a 4.37 mi (7.03 km) long 2nd order tributary to Buffalo Creek in Washington County, Pennsylvania.

== Course ==
Buck Run rises about 0.5 miles south of Donley, Pennsylvania, in Washington County and then flows north-northwest to join Buffalo Creek at Acheson.

== Watershed ==
Buck Run drains 5.74 square miles (14.9 km^{2}) of area, receives about 40.1 in/year of precipitation, has a wetness index of 310.59, and is about 67% forested.

== See also ==
- List of Pennsylvania Rivers
