= Sawhill Run =

Stream in Pennsylvania, USA

Sawhill Run Tributary to Buffalo Creek
- Location of Sawhill Run mouth Sawhill Run (the United States)

Location
- Country: United States
- State: Pennsylvania
- County: Washington

Physical characteristics
- Source: Bonar Creek divide
  - location: about 1.5 miles south of Claysville, Pennsylvania
  - coordinates: 40°05′40″N 080°24′28″W
  - elevation: 1,270 ft (390 m)
- Mouth: Buffalo Creek
  - location: about 3 miles southeast of Claysville, Pennsylvania
  - coordinates: 40°06′14″N 080°21′47″W
  - elevation: 1,060 ft (320 m)
- Length: 2.54 mi (4.09 km)
- Basin size: 2.81 square miles (7.3 km^{2})
- Discharge
  - location: Buffalo Creek
  - average: 3.64 cu ft/s (0.103 m^{3}/s) at mouth with Buffalo Creek

Basin features
- Progression: Buffalo Creek → Ohio River → Mississippi River → Gulf of Mexico
- River system: Ohio River
- Tributaries
  - left: unnamed tributaries
  - right: unnamed tributaries
- Bridges: Sunset Road

Sawhill Run is a 2.54 mi (4.09 km) long 2nd order tributary to Buffalo Creek in Washington County, Pennsylvania. This is the only stream of this name in the United States.

== Course ==
Sawhill Run rises about 1.5 miles south of Claysville, Pennsylvania, in Washington County and then flows generally east to join Buffalo Creek about 3 miles southeast of Claysville.

== Watershed ==
Sawhill Run drains 2.81 square miles (7.3 km^{2}) of area, receives about 40.5 in/year of precipitation, has a wetness index of 300.98, and is about 57% forested.

== See also ==
- List of Pennsylvania Rivers
