= Dutch Fork (Buffalo Creek tributary) =

Stream in Pennsylvania, USA

Dutch Fork Tributary to Buffalo Creek
- Location of Dutch Fork mouth Dutch Fork (Buffalo Creek tributary) (the United States)

Location
- Country: United States
- State: Pennsylvania
- County: Washington
- Borough: Claysville

Physical characteristics
- Source: unnamed tributary to Buffalo Creek divide
  - location: about 0.25 miles east of Claysville, Pennsylvania
  - coordinates: 40°07′25″N 080°23′54″W
  - elevation: 1,180 ft (360 m)
- Mouth: Buffalo Creek
  - location: about 0.5 miles southeast of Dunsfort, Pennsylvania
  - coordinates: 40°11′02″N 080°29′11″W
  - elevation: 853 ft (260 m)
- Length: 11.23 mi (18.07 km)
- Basin size: 23.59 square miles (61.1 km^{2})
- Discharge
  - location: Buffalo Creek
  - average: 27.96 cu ft/s (0.792 m^{3}/s) at mouth with Buffalo Creek

Basin features
- Progression: Buffalo Creek → Ohio River → Mississippi River → Gulf of Mexico
- River system: Ohio River
- Tributaries
  - left: Bonar Creek; Ralston Run
  - right: unnamed tributaries
- Waterbodies: Dutch Fork Lake
- Bridges: US 40, Valley View Road, Railroad Street, Highland Avenue, Bank Alley, Green Street, Spring Alley, Railroad Street, I-70, PA 231, Old National Pike, I-70 (x3), US 40 (x2), Hicks Road, Dutch Fork Church Road, Lake Road

Dutch Fork is a 11.23 mi (18.07 km) long 3rd order tributary to Buffalo Creek in Washington County, Pennsylvania.

== Variant names ==
According to the Geographic Names Information System, it has also been known historically as:

- Dutch Fork of Buffalo Creek

== Course ==
Dutch Fork rises about 0.25 miles east of Claysville, Pennsylvania, in Washington County and then flows west and north to join Buffalo Creek about 0.5 miles southeast of Dunsfort.

== Watershed ==
Dutch Fork drains 23.59 square miles (61.1 km^{2}) of area, receives about 40.5 in/year of precipitation, has a wetness index of 306.89, and is about 62% forested.

== See also ==
- List of Pennsylvania Rivers
