= Kimlin Run =

Stream in West Virginia, USA

Kimlin Run Tributary to Buffalo Creek
- Location of Kimlin Run mouth Kimlin Run (the United States)

Location
- Country: United States
- State: West Virginia
- County: Brooke

Physical characteristics
- Source: Spring Run divide
  - location: about 1 mile west of McKinleyville, West Virginia
  - coordinates: 40°14′11″N 080°37′18″W
  - elevation: 1.040 ft (0.317 m)
- Mouth: Buffalo Creek
  - location: about 0.25 miles south of McKinleyville, West Virginia
  - coordinates: 40°14′15″N 080°36′06″W
  - elevation: 705 ft (215 m)
- Length: 1.03 mi (1.66 km)
- Basin size: 0.54 square miles (1.4 km^{2})
- Discharge
  - location: Buffalo Creek
  - average: 0.66 cu ft/s (0.019 m^{3}/s) at mouth with Buffalo Creek

Basin features
- Progression: Buffalo Creek → Ohio River → Mississippi River → Gulf of Mexico
- River system: Ohio River
- Tributaries
  - left: unnamed tributaties
  - right: unnamed tributaries
- Bridges: WV 67/2

Kimlin Run is a 1.03 mi (1.66 km) long 1st order tributary to Buffalo Creek in Brooke County, West Virginia. This is the only stream of this name in the United States.

== Course ==
Kimlin Run rises about 1 mile west of McKinleyville, West Virginia, and then flows east to join Buffalo Creek about 0.25 miles south of McKinleyville.

== Watershed ==
Kimlin Run drains 0.54 square miles (1.4 km^{2}) of area, receives about 40.0 in/year of precipitation, has a wetness index of 279.16, and is about 85% forested.

== See also ==
- List of rivers of West Virginia
