= Sawhill Covered Bridge =

- U.S. National Register of Historic Places
- Washington County History & Landmarks Foundation Landmark
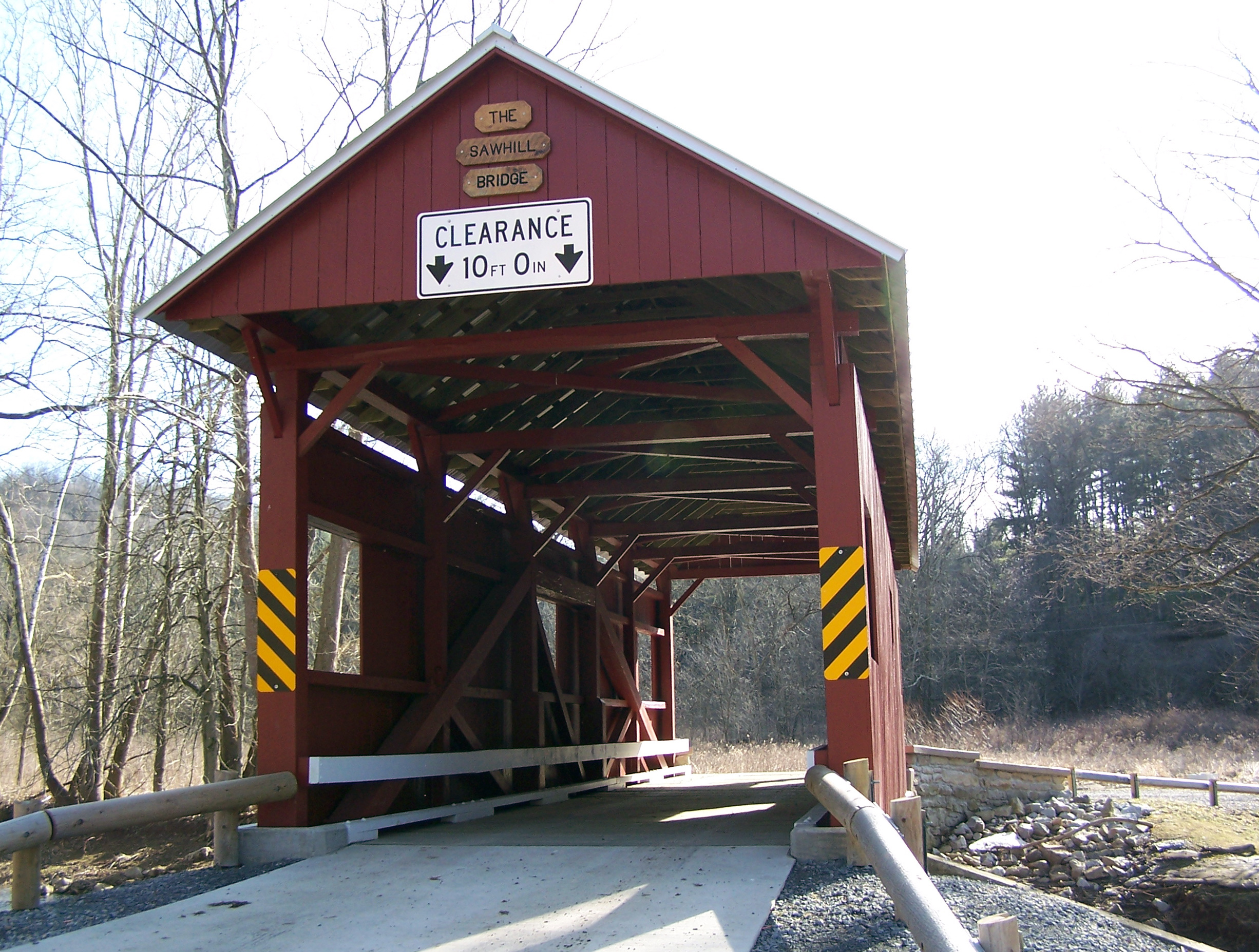
- Sawhill Covered Bridge in 2007

- Location within Pennsylvania Location within the United States
- Nearest city: Taylorstown, Pennsylvania
- Coordinates: 40°10′48″N 80°24′59″W
- Area: 0.1 acres (0.040 ha)
- Built: 1915
- Architectural style: Queenpost truss
- MPS: Covered Bridges of Washington and Greene Counties TR
- NRHP reference No.: 79002358
- Added to NRHP: June 22, 1979

The Sawhill Covered Bridge is a historic covered bridge in Taylorstown, Pennsylvania.

It is designated as a historic bridge by the Washington County History & Landmarks Foundation.
