= Brush Run (Buffalo Creek tributary) =

Stream in Pennsylvania, USA

Brush Run Tributary to Buffalo Creek
- Location of Brush Run mouth Brush Run (Buffalo Creek tributary) (the United States)

Location
- Country: United States
- State: Pennsylvania
- County: Washington

Physical characteristics
- Source: Georges Run divide
  - location: about 3 miles east of Buffalo, Pennsylvania
  - coordinates: 40°13′29″N 080°19′55″W
  - elevation: 1,238 ft (377 m)
- Mouth: Buffalo Creek
  - location: Acheson, Pennsylvania
  - coordinates: 40°11′35″N 080°27′08″W
  - elevation: 886 ft (270 m)
- Length: 8.64 mi (13.90 km)
- Basin size: 21.73 square miles (56.3 km^{2})
- Discharge
  - location: Buffalo Creek
  - average: 24.81 cu ft/s (0.703 m^{3}/s) at mouth with Buffalo Creek

Basin features
- Progression: Buffalo Creek → Ohio River → Mississippi River → Gulf of Mexico
- River system: Ohio River
- Tributaries
  - left: unnamed tributaries
  - right: Dunkle Run
- Bridges: Linnwood Drive, PA 844, PA 331, Reed Road, Greencove Road, Oak Ridge Road, PA 231

Brush Run is a 8.64 mi (13.90 km) long 1st order tributary to Buffalo Creek in Washington County, Pennsylvania.

== Course ==
Brush Run rises about 3 miles east of Buffalo, Pennsylvania, in Washington County and then flows west-southwest to join Buffalo Creek at Acheson.

== Watershed ==
Brush Run drains 24.81 square miles (64.3 km^{2}) of area, receives about 39.9 in/year of precipitation, has a wetness index of 323.39, and is about 40% forested.

== See also ==
- List of Pennsylvania Rivers
