= Castleman Run =

Stream in West Virginia, United States

Castleman Run Tributary to Buffalo Creek
- Location of Castleman Run mouth Castleman Run (the United States)

Location
- Country: United States
- State: West Virginia
- County: Brooke; Ohio; Washington (PA)
- City: Bethany

Physical characteristics
- Source: Little Wheeling Creek divide
  - location: about 1 mile north of West Alexander, Pennsylvania
  - coordinates: 40°07′14″N 080°30′55″W
  - elevation: 1,180 ft (360 m)
- Mouth: Buffalo Creek
  - location: Bethany, West Virginia
  - coordinates: 40°12′04″N 080°33′13″W
  - elevation: 791 ft (241 m)
- Length: 7.54 mi (12.13 km)
- Basin size: 17.04 square miles (44.1 km^{2})
- Discharge
  - location: Buffalo Creek
  - average: 20.18 cu ft/s (0.571 m^{3}/s) at mouth with Buffalo Creek

Basin features
- Progression: Buffalo Creek → Ohio River → Mississippi River → Gulf of Mexico
- River system: Ohio River
- Tributaries
  - left: Rices Run; Garrison Run; Longs Run
  - right: Crupe Run; North Prong Castleman Run
- Waterbodies: Castleman Run Lake
- Bridges: Crupes Run Road, Castleman Run Road (x2), Castleman Hill Road, Castleman Run Road (x2), Marlboro Spur Road

Castleman Run is a 7.54 mi (12.13 km) long 3rd order tributary to Buffalo Creek in Brooke County, West Virginia. This is the only stream of this name in the United States. Castleman Run Lake, an impoundment of this stream, is protected as Castleman Run Lake Wildlife Management Area by the State of West Virginia.

== Variant names ==
According to the Geographic Names Information System, it has also been known historically as:

- Castleman's Run
- Castlemans Run
- Castlemens Run

== Course ==
Castleman Run rises about 1 mile north of West Alexander, Pennsylvania, in Washington County and then flows northwest into West Virginia and Ohio County and then Brooke County to join Buffalo Creek at Bethany, West Virginia.

== Watershed ==
Castleman Run drains 17.04 square miles (44.1 km^{2}) of area, receives about 40.5 in/year of precipitation, has a wetness index of 299.39, and is about 66% forested.

== See also ==
- List of rivers of West Virginia
