= Grog (Marvel Comics) =

Publication information
- Publisher: Marvel Comics
- First appearance: Thor #390 (April 1988)
- Created by: Tom DeFalco and Ron Frenz

In-story information
- Partnerships: Seth
- Notable aliases: The God-Slayer, Grog the God-Crusher

Grog the God-Slayer is a fictional character appearing in American comic books published by Marvel Comics. The character is depicted as a member of the Heliopolitan race of gods.

== Publication history ==
Grog first appeared in Thor #390 (April 1988), and was created by Tom DeFalco and Ron Frenz.

The character subsequently appears in Thor #396-400 (Oct. 1988-Feb. 1989). His final appearance was in Thor vol. 3 Annual #1 (1990).

Grog the God-Slayer received an entry in the Official Handbook of the Marvel Universe Update '89 #3.

== Fictional character biography ==
A loyal follower of the Egyptian god of death, Seth, Grog leads his armies to assassinate Thor after his return to Earth. On the Avengers' floating headquarters, Hydro-Base, Grog and his forces attack Thor. Thor fends off Grog with the Captain and Black Knight. Seth is imprisoned in the Vault, where Thor questions him about Earth Force - a group founded by Seth. Grog manages to escape prison and overwhelms Thor with his troops.

Grog is defeated by Thor, but escapes via a secret door and returns with reinforcements. However, he is thwarted by Thor and his allies. Unwilling to admit defeat, Grog resurfaces amidst Thor's battle with Surtur. Surtur uses the Black Pyramid as a weapon against Thor, but Thor destroys the pyramid, crushing Grog and his remaining forces within. Grog survives and is sent to Earth by Seth. After being defeated by Thor, Grog is killed by Seth as punishment.
