= Grogger =

Grogger(s) can refer to:

- Grager, a noisemaker used during Purim to "blot out" Haman's name, also spelt grogger
- Grogger, a 19th-century name for a cooper (barrel-maker) on ships
- Grogger (game), an online game developed to prevent drunk driving
- Paula Grogger (1892-1984), an Austrian writer
- The Groggers, a Jewish New York pop punk band
