= Frogtown, Washington County, Pennsylvania =

Frogtown, Pennsylvania
- Unincorporated community
- Location within Pennsylvania
- Coordinates: 40°12′31″N 80°30′19″W
- Country: United States
- State: Pennsylvania
- County: Washington
- Township: Independence
- Elevation: 902 ft (275 m)
- Time zone: UTC-5 (Eastern (EST))
  - Summer (DST): UTC-4 (EDT)
- GNIS feature ID: 1175287

Frogtown is an unincorporated community in Independence Township, Washington County, Pennsylvania, United States.
