= Sugarcamp Run (Buffalo Creek tributary) =

Stream in West Virginia, USA

Sugarcamp Run Tributary to Buffalo Creek
- Location of Sugarcamp Run mouth Sugarcamp Run (Buffalo Creek tributary) (the United States)

Location
- Country: United States
- State: West Virginia; Pennsylvania
- Counties: Brooke; Washington

Physical characteristics
- Source: unnamed tributary to Cross Creek divide
  - location: pond about 1 mile east of Independence, Pennsylvania
  - coordinates: 40°15′21″N 080°28′43″W
  - elevation: 1,230 ft (370 m)
- Mouth: Buffalo Creek
  - location: about 2 miles southeast of Bethany, West Virginia
  - coordinates: 40°11′38″N 080°31′45″W
  - elevation: 823 ft (251 m)
- Length: 6.58 mi (10.59 km)
- Basin size: 10.00 square miles (25.9 km^{2})
- Discharge
  - location: Buffalo Creek
  - average: 11.56 cu ft/s (0.327 m^{3}/s) at mouth with Buffalo Creek

Basin features
- Progression: Buffalo Creek → Ohio River → Mississippi River → Gulf of Mexico
- River system: Ohio River
- Tributaries
  - left: unnamed tributaries
  - right: Indian Camp Run; Brashears Run
- Bridges: Sugar Run Road, PA 844, Sugar Run Road (x6)

Sugarcamp Run is a 6.58 mi (10.59 km) long 3rd order tributary to Buffalo Creek in Brooke County, West Virginia.

== Variant names ==
According to the Geographic Names Information System, it has also been known historically as:

- Sugar Camp Run
- Sugar Run

== Course ==
Sugarcamp Run rises about 1 mile east of Independence, Pennsylvania, in Washington County and then flows southwesterly into Brooke County to join Buffalo Creek about 2 miles southeast of Bethany, West Virginia.

== Watershed ==
Sugarcamp Run drains 10.00 square miles (25.9 km^{2}) of area, receives about 40.1 in/year of precipitation, has a wetness index of 329.61, and is about 44% forested.

== See also ==
- List of rivers of West Virginia
