= Grog Run (Ohio) =

Stream in Ohio, U.S.

Coordinates: 39°15′50″N 84°13′52″W

Grog Run is a stream in the U.S. state of Ohio.

According to the Warren County Genealogical Society, the origin of the name "Grog Run" is unknown. Locally, the name derives from the stream that runs parallel with the road. Grog Run Creek, as it is locally known, lets out into the Little Miami River right outside of Loveland, Ohio. According to a number of residents, there have been many Native American arrowheads and other artifacts found near the creek and the surrounding banks.
