= Taylorstown, Pennsylvania =

Unincorporated community in Pennsylvania, US

Coordinates: 40°09′35″N 80°22′41″W

- Census-designated place
- Interactive map of Taylorstown, Pennsylvania
- Country: United States
- State: Pennsylvania
- County: Washington

Area
  - Total: 1.05 sq mi (2.73 km^{2})
  - Land: 1.05 sq mi (2.73 km^{2})
  - Water: 0 sq mi (0.00 km^{2})

Population (2020)
  - Total: 213
  - Density: 201.7/sq mi (77.89/km^{2})
- Time zone: UTC-5 (Eastern (EST))
  - Summer (DST): UTC-4 (EDT)
- ZIP codes: 15323; 15365
- Area codes: 724, 878
- FIPS code: 42-76232

Taylorstown, Pennsylvania is a census-designated place in Blaine Township, Washington County, Pennsylvania, United States. Taylorstown has been assigned the ZIP codes 15323 and 15365. As of the 2010 census the population of Taylorstown was 217 residents.

It is home to the Taylorstown Historic District. Pennsylvania Route 221 runs through it.

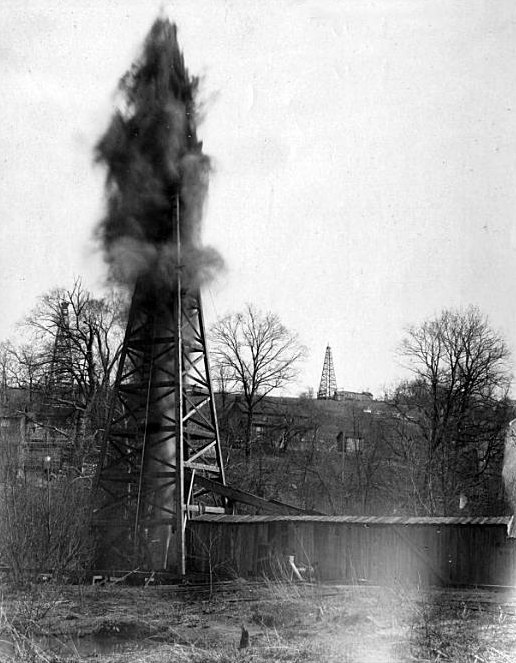
An oil derrick in Taylorstown, c. 1903.

== Demographics ==
Historical population
Census	Pop.	Note	%±
2010	217		—
2020	213		−1.8%
U.S. Decennial Census

== Education ==
It is in the McGuffey School District.
