= Fowlerstown, West Virginia =

Unincorporated community in West Virginia, United States

- Unincorporated community
- Location within the state of West Virginia Fowlerstown (the United States)
- Coordinates: 40°16′47″N 80°33′19″W
- Country: United States
- State: West Virginia
- County: Brooke
- Time zone: UTC-5 (Eastern (EST))
  - Summer (DST): UTC-4 (EDT)
- GNIS feature ID: 1539200

Fowlerstown is an unincorporated community in Brooke County, West Virginia, United States. It lies on West Virginia Route 27, east of Wellsburg. It was also known as Fowlerston.

The Inn at Fowlerstown is listed on the National Register of Historic Places.
