= Grog Run (Buffalo Creek tributary) =

Stream in West Virginia, USA

Grog Run Tributary to Buffalo Creek
- Location of Grog Run mouth Grog Run (Buffalo Creek tributary) (the United States)

Location
- Country: United States
- State: West Virginia
- County: Brooke

Physical characteristics
- Source: unnamed tributary to Ohio River divide
  - location: about 1.5 miles east of Power, West Virginia
  - coordinates: 40°12′42″N 080°38′04″W
  - elevation: 1,090 ft (330 m)
- Mouth: Buffalo Creek
  - location: about 2 miles northwest of Bethany, West Virginia
  - coordinates: 40°13′30″N 080°35′32″W
  - elevation: 738 ft (225 m)
- Length: 2.53 mi (4.07 km)
- Basin size: 2.29 square miles (5.9 km^{2})
- Discharge
  - location: Buffalo Creek
  - average: 2.71 cu ft/s (0.077 m^{3}/s) at mouth with Buffalo Creek

Basin features
- Progression: Buffalo Creek → Ohio River → Mississippi River → Gulf of Mexico
- River system: Ohio River
- Tributaries
  - left: unnamed tributaties
  - right: unnamed tributaries
- Bridges: none

Grog Run is a 2.53 mi (4.07 km) long 1st order tributary to Buffalo Creek in Brooke County, West Virginia.

== Course ==
Grog Run rises about 1.5 miles east of Power, West Virginia, and then flows west-northwest to join Buffalo Creek about 2 miles northwest of Bethany.

== Watershed ==
Grog Run drains 2.29 square miles (5.9 km^{2}) of area, receives about 40.0 in/year of precipitation, has a wetness index of 300.19, and is about 83% forested.

== See also ==
- List of rivers of West Virginia
