= South Franklin Township, Pennsylvania =

Township in Pennsylvania, US

Coordinates: 40°05′57″N 80°17′39″W

South Franklin Township
- Township
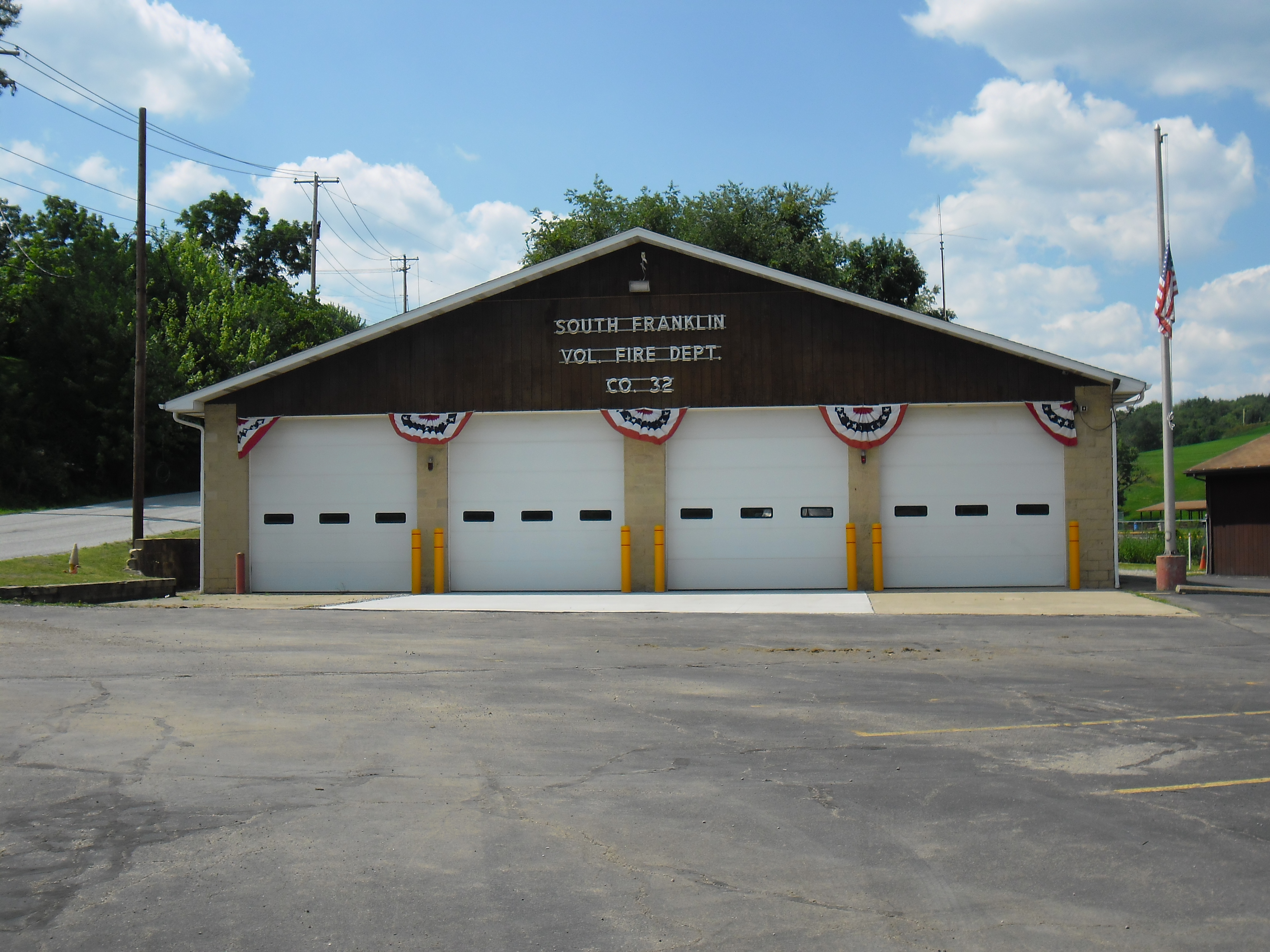
- South Franklin Volunteer Fire Department
- Etymology: Benjamin Franklin
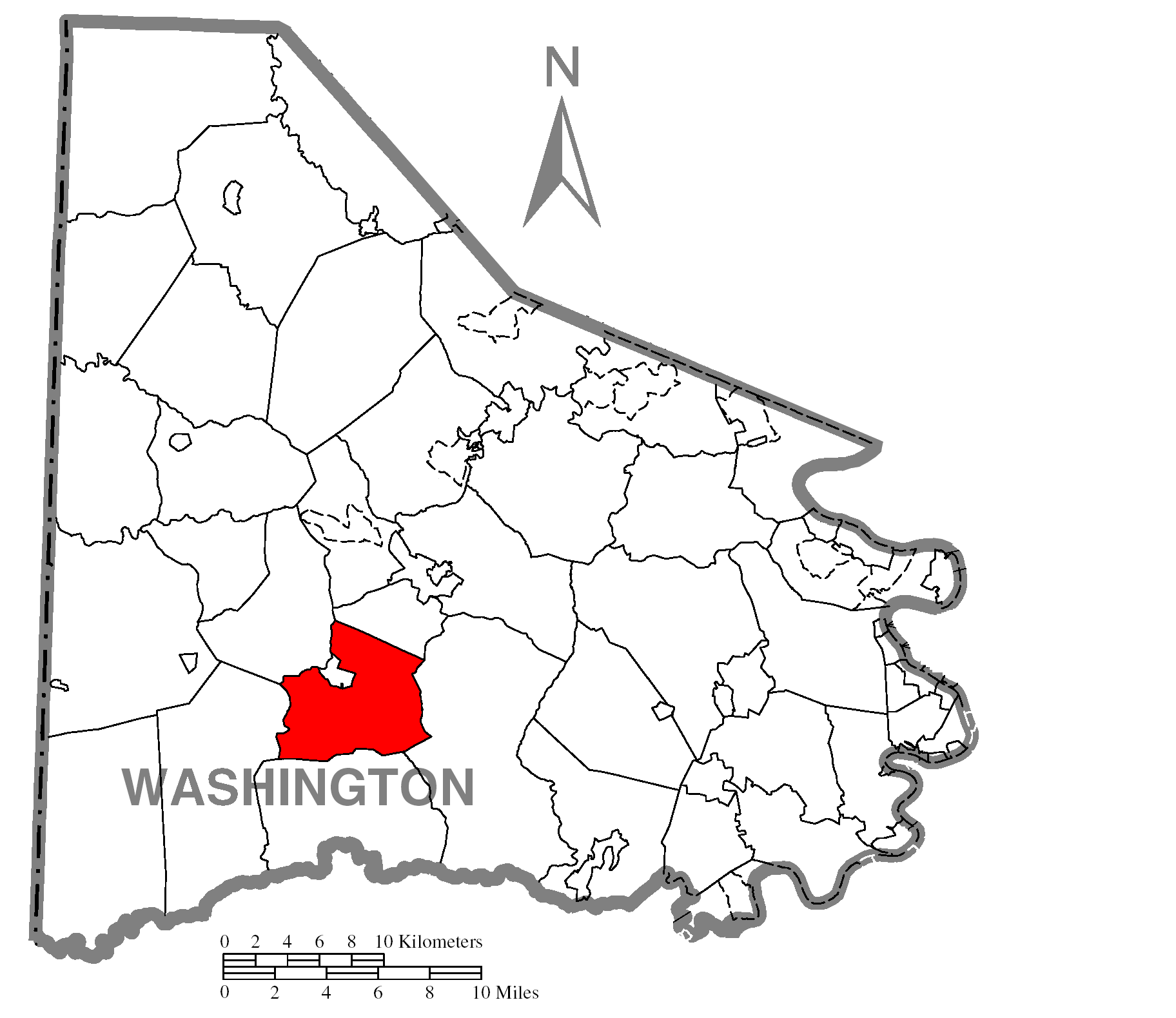
- Location of South Franklin Township in Washington County

- Location of Washington County in Pennsylvania
- Country: United States
- State: Pennsylvania
- County: Washington County
- Established: February 2, 1892

Area
  - Total: 20.67 sq mi (53.53 km^{2})
  - Land: 20.58 sq mi (53.30 km^{2})
  - Water: 0.089 sq mi (0.23 km^{2})

Population (2020)
  - Total: 2,864 ▼
  - Estimate (2021): 2,844
  - Density: 158/sq mi (60.9/km^{2})
- Time zone: UTC-4 (EST)
  - Summer (DST): UTC-5 (EDT)
- Area code: 724
- FIPS code: 42-125-72176
- Website: www.southfranklintwp.org

Historical population
Census	Pop.	Note	%±
2000	3,796		—
2010	3,310		−12.8%
2020	2,864		−13.5%
2025 (est.)	2,855		−0.3%
U.S. Decennial Census

South Franklin Township is a township in Washington County, Pennsylvania, United States. The population was 2,864 at the 2020 census.

== Geography ==
According to the United States Census Bureau, the township has a total area of 20.7 square miles (53.5 km^{2}), of which, 20.6 square miles (53.3 km^{2}) of it is land and 0.1 square miles (0.2 km^{2}) of it (0.39%) is water.

== Demographics ==
At the 2000 census, there were 3,796 people, 1,360 households, and 1,083 families living in the township. The population density was 184.5 inhabitants per square mile (71.2/km^{2}). There were 1,450 housing units at an average density of 70.5 per square mile (27.2/km^{2}). The racial makeup of the township was 99.18% White, 0.18% African American, 0.11% Native American, 0.24% Asian, 0.08% from other races, and 0.21% from two or more races. Hispanic or Latino of any race were 0.50%.

Of the 1,360 households, 38.8% had children under the age of 18 living with them, 67.5% were married couples living together, 8.4% had a female householder with no husband present, and 20.3% were non-families. 16.5% of households were one person and 5.0% were one person aged 65 or older. The average household size was 2.79 and the average family size was 3.12.

The age distribution was 27.1% under the age of 18, 7.6% from 18 to 24, 27.7% from 25 to 44, 27.5% from 45 to 64, and 10.1% 65 or older. The median age was 38 years. For every 100 females there were 99.5 males. For every 100 females age 18 and over, there were 96.5 males.

The median household income was $46,713 and the median family income was $53,500. Males had a median income of $37,888 versus $24,923 for females. The per capita income for the township was $18,975. About 4.7% of families and 5.4% of the population were below the poverty line, including 4.3% of those under age 18 and 8.0% of those age 65 or over.
