= Taylorstown Historic District (Taylorstown, Pennsylvania) =

Historic district in Pennsylvania, United States

- U.S. National Register of Historic Places
- U.S. Historic district
- Washington County History & Landmarks Foundation Landmark
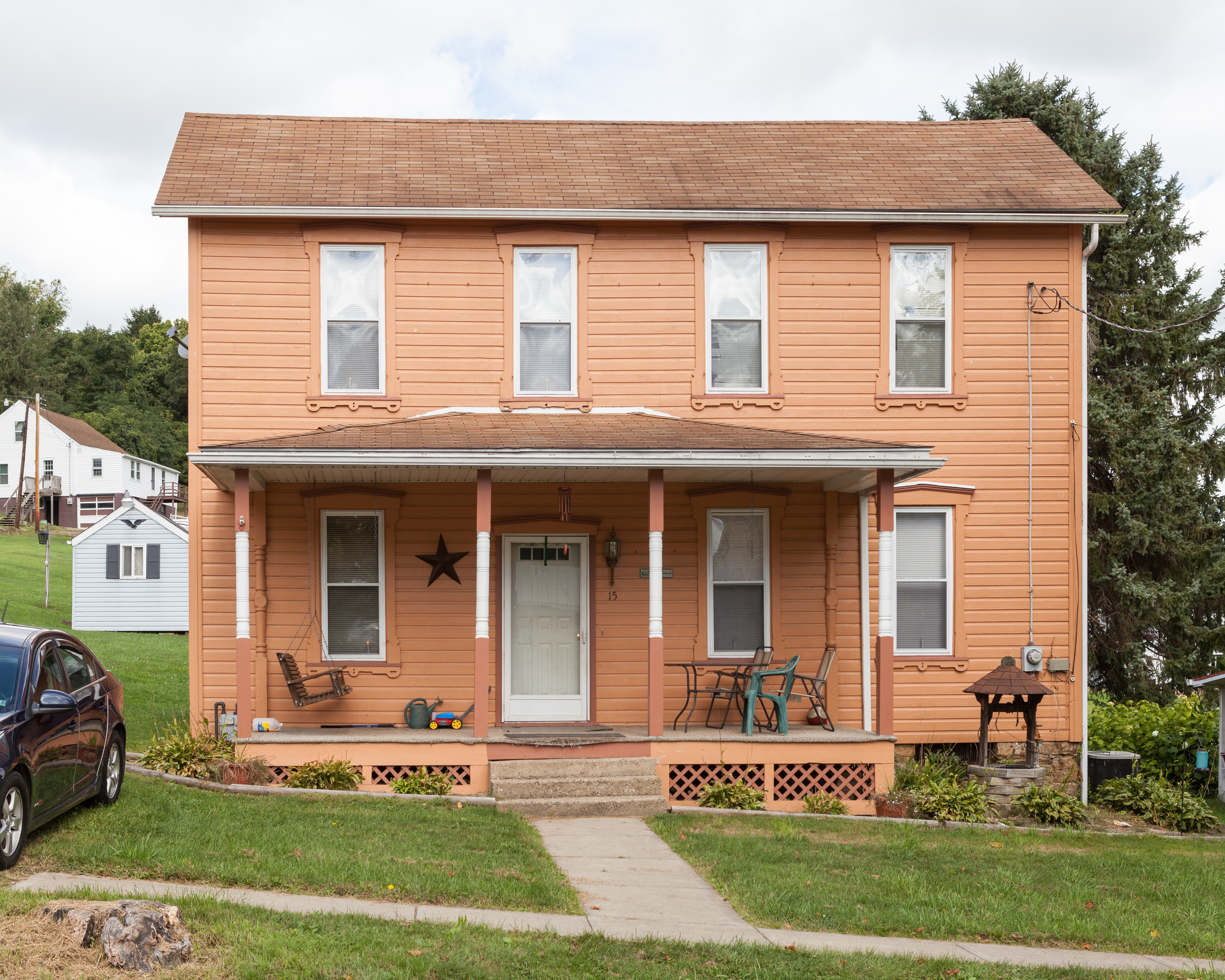
- The house at 15 Main St, a contributing property

- Location within Pennsylvania Location within the United States
- Location: Main St., Taylorstown, Pennsylvania
- Coordinates: 40°9′35″N 80°22′45″W
- Area: 16.9 acres (6.8 ha)
- Architectural style: Greek Revival, Late Victorian, Federal
- NRHP reference No.: 85001958
- Added to NRHP: September 05, 1985

Taylorstown Historic District is a historic district in Taylorstown, Pennsylvania.

It is designated as a historic district by the Washington County History & Landmarks Foundation.
