= Buffalo Creek (Ohio River tributary) =

Tributary of the Ohio River

Buffalo Creek Tributary to Ohio River
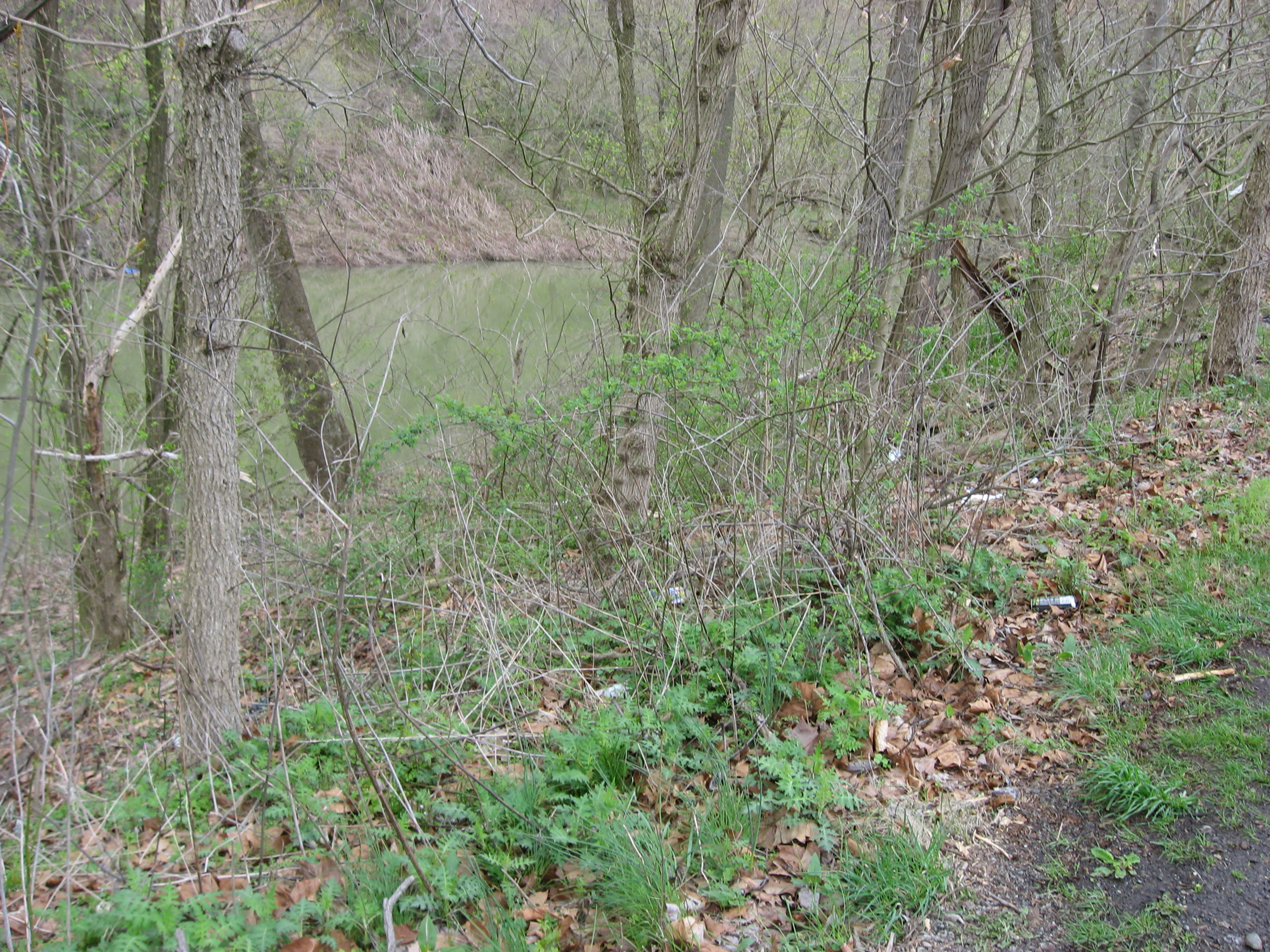
- Marshel Woolen Mill Site along Buffalo Creek and WV 67 (Bethany Pike)

- Location of Buffalo Creek mouth Buffalo Creek (Ohio River tributary) (the United States)

Location
- Country: United States
- State: West Virginia; Pennsylvania
- Counties: Brooke (WV); Washington (PA)
- City: Bethany
- Borough: Taylorstown

Physical characteristics
- Source: Templeton Fork divide
  - location: Pleasant Grove, Pennsylvania
  - coordinates: 40°04′35″N 080°21′44″W
  - elevation: 1,270 ft (390 m)
- Mouth: Ohio River
  - location: Wellsburg, West Virginia
  - coordinates: 40°15′52″N 080°36′55″W
  - elevation: 644 ft (196 m)
- Length: 39.85 mi (64.13 km)
- Basin size: 162.71 square miles (421.4 km^{2})
- Discharge
  - location: Ohio River
  - average: 177.39 cu ft/s (5.023 m^{3}/s) at mouth with Ohio River

Basin features
- Progression: Ohio River → Mississippi River → Gulf of Mexico
- River system: Ohio River
- Tributaries
  - left: Sawhill Run, Buck Run, Dutch Fork, Dog Run, Castleman Run, Logan Run, Stotts Run, Hogtan Run, Hukill Run, Grog Run, Kimlin Run, Greens Run
  - right: Wolf Run, Brush Run, Narigan Run, Welch Run, Sugarcamp Run, Camp Run, Cascade Run, Mingo Run, Pierce Run, Titt Run, Painters Run
- Bridges: Chapel Hill Road, Cracraft Road, Sunset Road, Hawthorn Road, I-70, US 40, N Sunset Beach Road, Newman Road, Main Street, Walker Hill Road, Reed Road, PA 221 (x2), Greencove Road, PA 221, Pole Cat Hollow Road, Camp Buffalo Road (x2), PA 231, Brush Run Road, Dry Ridge Road, WV 32/3 (Counselmans Hill Road), WV 67 (x2) (Bethany Pike), WV 88 (West Liberty Road), WV 30/1. WV 30, Johnston Lane, Mazzella Lane, WV 67 (Bethany Pike), Genteel Ridge Road, WV 67 (x3) (Bethany Pike), WV 2

Buffalo Creek is a stream which runs through the United States commonwealths of Pennsylvania and West Virginia. It rises in East Finley Township, Washington County, Pennsylvania.

Its tributaries are Brushy Run, Mill Run, Indian Camp Run, Buck Run, and Dutch Fork. These streams flow through the townships of East Findley, Donegal, Hopewell, and Buffalo, and the creek itself empties into the Ohio River at Wellsburg, West Virginia

The stream was possibly named for a Buffalo trace that once passed through the valley.

== History ==
The Buffalo Creek area was first visited by Europeans in the 1600s by LaSalle. Later in 1749, Captain Celeron de Blainville sailed down the Ohio River planting lead plates to claim land for France. These claims were then nullified during the Treaty of Paris of 1763.

Settlement of the watershed began in the early 1770s with James Caldwell. In 1773, Thomas Clark and some Germans settled along Dutch Fork, hence the name of the tributary. Jacob Miller, Sr., built a blockhouse near Dutch Fork around 1780, to provide a fortified strong-point for protection against Indian attacks.

The mouth of Buffalo Creek was the location of Wells Fort. A number of other forts were located in the watershed and include Rail's Fort (1770s), Ramsey's Fort (1770s) - near Bethany, and a blockhouse called Coon's Fort east of Bethany.

A stockade, called Rices Stockade, was located near the present Town of Bethany. Rices Stockade was the scene of an Indian raid in 1782.

The Washington County part of the watershed had an additional eight forts (see reference for names).

The watershed was the location of a number of mills, the most prominent of which was Waugh's Mill (a flour mill) built in the 1790s.

Oil was discovered in the watershed at Taylorstown, Pennsylvania in 1885.

== Course ==
Buffalo Creek rises at Pleasant Grove, Pennsylvania, in Washington County and then follows a westerly course into West Virginia to join the Ohio River at Wellsburg, West Virginia.

== Watershed ==
Buffalo Creek drains 162.71 square miles (421.4 km^{2}) of area, receives about 40.1 in/year of precipitation, has a wetness index of 316.09, and is about 80% forested.

== Maps ==
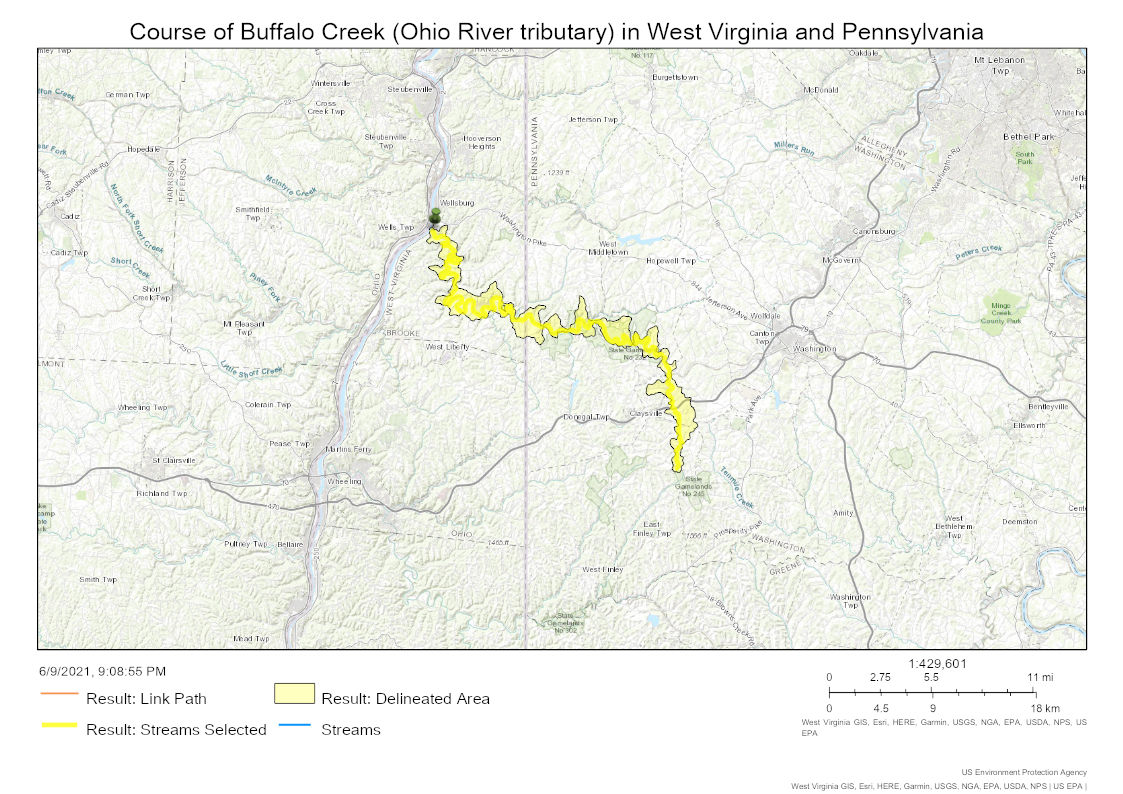
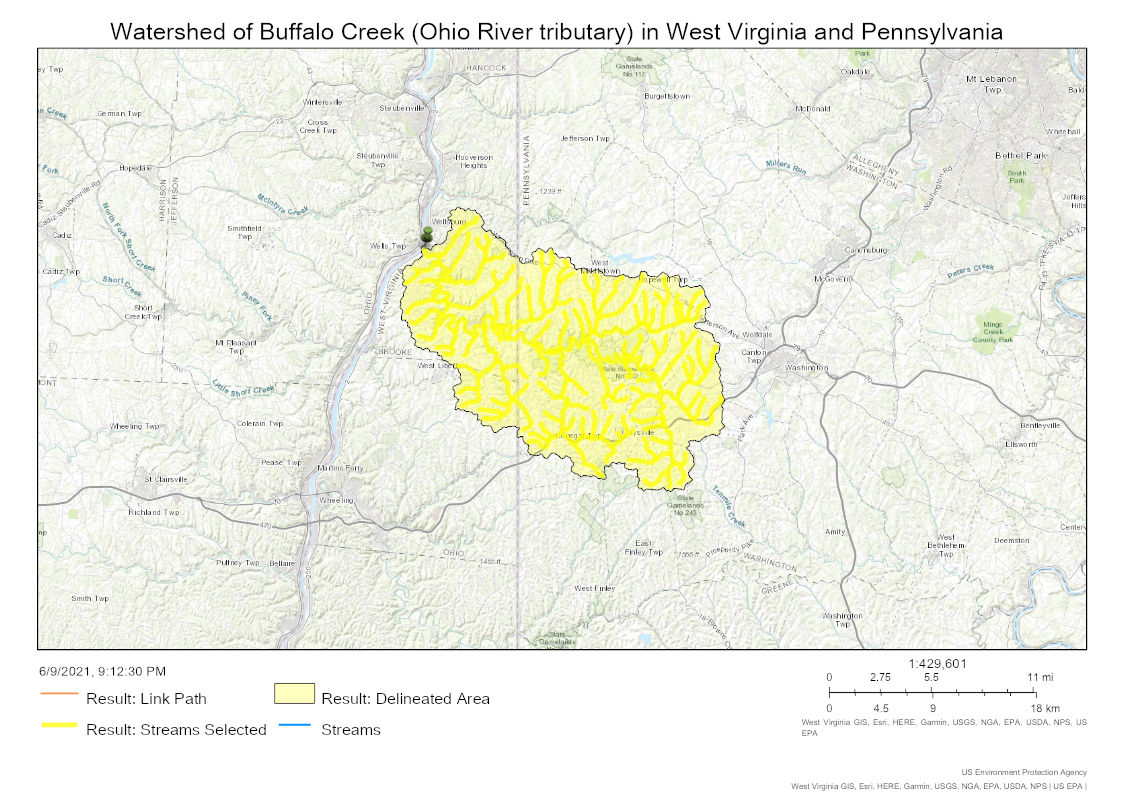

== See also ==
- List of rivers of Pennsylvania
