= Claysville, Pennsylvania =

Borough in Pennsylvania, US

- Borough
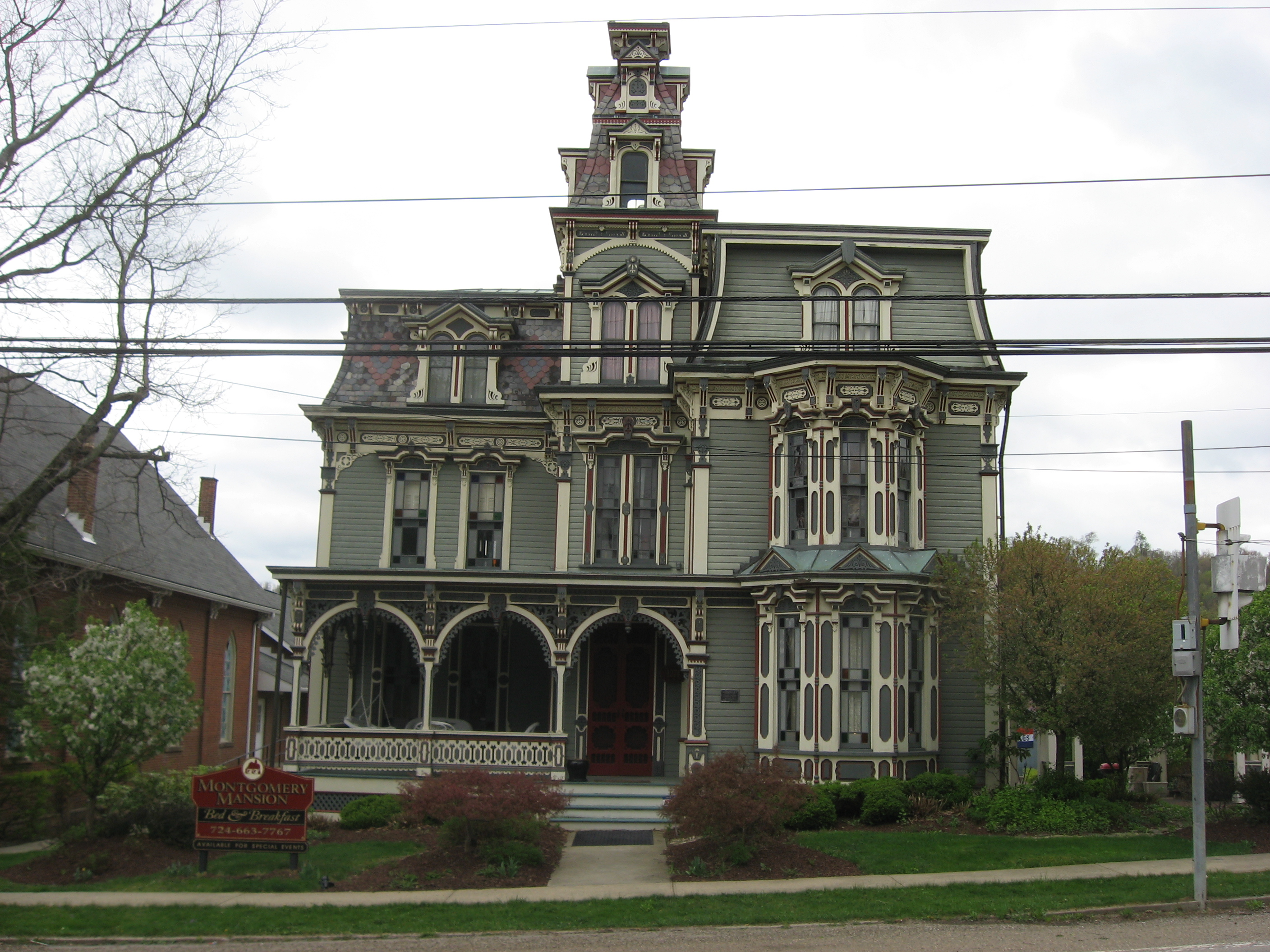
- The Montgomery House, a historic building on the borough's western edge
- Etymology: Henry Clay
- Location of Claysville in Washington County, Pennsylvania.

- Location of Claysville in Pennsylvania Claysville, Pennsylvania (the United States)
- Coordinates: 40°7′8″N 80°24′45″W
- Country: United States
- State: Pennsylvania
- County: Washington
- Established: 1812

Government
  - Mayor: Geno Sibert

Area
  - Total: 0.32 sq mi (0.82 km^{2})
  - Land: 0.31 sq mi (0.80 km^{2})
  - Water: 0.0039 sq mi (0.01 km^{2})

Population (2020)
  - Total: 733
  - Density: 2,369.1/sq mi (914.72/km^{2})
- Time zone: UTC-4 (EST)
  - Summer (DST): UTC-5 (EDT)
- ZIP code: 15323
- Area code: 724
- FIPS code: 42-14000

Claysville is a borough in Washington County, Pennsylvania, United States and part of the Pittsburgh metropolitan area since 1950. The population was 728 at the 2020 census. Claysville Elementary School, part of the McGuffey School District is located in Claysville. It is the birthplace of Benjamin Franklin Jones of the Jones and Laughlin Steel Company.

== History ==
The Montgomery House was listed on the National Register of Historic Places in 2002.

== Geography ==
Claysville is located at 40°7′8″N 80°24′45″W (40.118984, -80.412536).

According to the United States Census Bureau, the borough has a total area of 0.3 square miles (0.78 km^{2}), of which 0.3 square miles (0.78 km^{2}) is land and 3.12% is water.

== Demographics ==
Historical population
Census	Pop.	Note	%±
1850	275		—
1860	298		8.4%
1870	284		−4.7%
1880	323		13.7%
1890	1,041		222.3%
1900	856		−17.8%
1910	1,045		22.1%
1920	1,009		−3.4%
1930	912		−9.6%
1940	970		6.4%
1950	963		−0.7%
1960	986		2.4%
1970	951		−3.5%
1980	1,029		8.2%
1990	962		−6.5%
2000	724		−24.7%
2010	829		14.5%
2020	718		−13.4%
2025 (est.)	706	▼	−1.7%

As of the census of 2000, there were 724 people, 242 households, and 189 families residing in the borough. The population density was 2,349.8 inhabitants per square mile (907.3/km^{2}). There were 261 housing units at an average density of 847.1 per square mile (327.1/km^{2}). The racial makeup of the borough was 99.45% White, 0.28% African American, and 0.28% from two or more races.

There were 242 households, out of which 35.1% had children under the age of 18 living with them, 60.7% were married couples living together, 12.8% had a female householder with no husband present, and 21.9% were non-families. 19.4% of all households were made up of individuals, and 14.0% had someone living alone who was 65 years of age or older. The average household size was 2.73 and the average family size was 3.06.

In the borough the population was spread out, with 25.6% under the age of 18, 6.4% from 18 to 24, 26.2% from 25 to 44, 21.0% from 45 to 64, and 20.9% who were 65 years of age or older. The median age was 40 years. For every 100 females, there were 90.0 males. For every 100 females age 18 and over, there were 87.8 males.

The median income for a household in the borough was $36,000, and the median income for a family was $40,000. Males had a median income of $28,125 versus $21,591 for females. The per capita income for the borough was $14,785. About 12.4% of families and 13.4% of the population were below the poverty line, including 16.1% of those under age 18 and 18.4% were above age 64.

== Education ==
It is in the McGuffey School District.
