= Ohio State Route 151 =

State highway in eastern Ohio, US

State Route 151

Route information
- Maintained by ODOT
- Length: 43.06 mi (69.30 km)
- Existed: 1924–present

Major junctions
- West end: US 250 near Bowerston
- US 22 near Hopedale
- East end: SR 7 near Mingo Junction

Location
- Country: United States
- State: Ohio
- Counties: Harrison, Jefferson

Highway system
- Ohio State Highway System; Interstate; US; State; Scenic
← SR 150	→ SR 152

State Route 151 (SR 151) is an east–west state highway in the eastern part of the U.S. state of Ohio. The western terminus of State Route 151 is at a T-intersection with U.S. Route 250 approximately 5 miles (8.0 km) southwest of Bowerston. Its eastern terminus is at a diamond interchange with State Route 7 just south of Mingo Junction.

== Route description ==
State Route 151 travels through Harrison and Jefferson Counties. Only the segment of SR 151 that is concurrent with US 22 near Hopedale is included within the National Highway System.

== History ==
When it was first established in 1924, State Route 151 consisted of what is now a stretch of State Route 212 between Sherrodsville and Bowerston and the current portion of State Route 151 between Bowerston and its current eastern terminus at State Route 7 near Mingo Junction. In 1927, the western end of State Route 151 changed shape when the former stretch of State Route 151 between Sherrodsville and Bowerston became State Route 212, and what was State Route 212 heading southwest from Bowerston to the former State Route 6 (now U.S. Route 250) became a re-routing of State Route 151. Consequently, State Route 151 took on the routing that it maintains to this day.

== Major intersections ==
County	Location	mi	km	Destinations	Notes
Harrison	Monroe Township	0.00	0.00	US 250 – Cadiz, Dennison	
Harrison	Bowerston	4.96	7.98	SR 212 west – Sherrodsville	Eastern terminus of SR 212
Harrison	North Township	10.23	16.46	SR 332 north – Carrollton	Southern terminus of SR 332
Harrison	Scio	11.73	18.88	SR 646 west (Main Street)	Western end of SR 646 concurrency
Harrison	Scio	11.78	18.96	SR 646 east – New Rumley, Germano	Eastern end of SR 646 concurrency
Harrison	Rumley Township	15.59	25.09	SR 9 south – Cadiz	Western end of SR 9 concurrency
Harrison	Jewett	17.42	28.03	SR 9 north (Jefferson Street) – Carrollton	Eastern end of SR 9 concurrency
Harrison	Green Township	22.75	36.61	US 22 west – Cambridge	Interchange; western end of US 22 concurrency
Harrison	Hopedale	24.01	38.64	US 22 east / CR 4 (Miller Station Road) – Steubenville	Interchange; eastern end of US 22 concurrency
Jefferson	Smithfield	32.93	53.00	SR 152 south (Main Street) – Dillonvale	Northern endpoint of the southern segment of SR 152
Jefferson	Steubenville Township	43.06	69.30	SR 7 – Steubenville, Bridgeport	Interchange
1.000 mi = 1.609 km; 1.000 km = 0.621 mi: Concurrency terminus
