= Ohio State Route 519 =

State highway in Harrison County, Ohio, US

State Route 519

Route information
- Maintained by ODOT
- Length: 11.08 mi (17.83 km)
- Existed: 1937–present

Major junctions
- West end: US 22 near New Athens
- East end: US 250 near Harrisville

Location
- Country: United States
- State: Ohio
- Counties: Harrison

Highway system
- Ohio State Highway System; Interstate; US; State; Scenic
← SR 518	→ SR 520

State Route 519 (SR 519) is an east–west state highway situated in eastern Ohio, a U.S. state. The highway runs from its western terminus at U.S. Route 22 approximately 6 miles (9.7 km) northwest of New Athens to its eastern terminus at U.S. Route 250 about 1 mile (1.6 km) northwest of Harrisville.

Found exclusively in the south eastern portion of Harrison County, State Route 519 was first designated in the late 1930s. While predominantly a winding rural two-lane highway, State Route 519 serves the community of New Athens, where it intersects State Route 9.

== Route description ==
The entirety of State Route 519 is situated within the southeastern quadrant of Harrison County. There is no portion of this state route that is inclusive within the National Highway System.

== History ==
State Route 519 made its first appearance in 1937 along the routing between U.S. Route 22 and U.S. Route 250 that it occupies to this day. No significant changes have taken place to the routing of State Route 519 since its designation.

== Major intersections ==
The entire route is in Harrison County.

Location	mi	km	Destinations	Notes
Moorefield Township	0.00	0.00	US 22 – Cambridge, Steubenville	
New Athens	6.42	10.33	SR 9 (Main Street) – St. Clairsville, Cadiz	
Short Creek Township	11.08	17.83	US 250 – Bridgeport, Cadiz	
1.000 mi = 1.609 km; 1.000 km = 0.621 mi
