= Ohio State Route 646 =

State highway in eastern Ohio, US

State Route 646

Route information
- Maintained by ODOT
- Length: 28.78 mi (46.32 km)
- Existed: 1937–present

Major junctions
- West end: US 250 in Stock Township
- East end: SR 43 near Wintersville

Location
- Country: United States
- State: Ohio
- Counties: Harrison, Jefferson

Highway system
- Ohio State Highway System; Interstate; US; State; Scenic
← SR 644	→ SR 647

State Route 646 (SR 646) is a 28.78-mile-long (46.32 km) state highway in Harrison and Jefferson Counties in eastern Ohio. The route runs from US 250 in Stock Township, northwest of Cadiz, to SR 43 in Island Creek Township, just outside Wintersville.

== Route description ==
SR 646 begins at a stop-controlled intersection with US 250 in Stock Township, Harrison County; about 8 miles (13 km) northwest of Cadiz. The intersection is on the shoreline of Tappan Lake. The state route heads northeast towards Scio through a valley formed by a small creek. Once it reaches Scio, the route makes numerous turns, has a grade crossing with an Ohio Central Railroad and the Conotton Creek Trail, and shares a brief concurrency with SR 151. Upon exiting the village, SR 646 travels in a more easterly direction. The route heads through the hills of Appalachia passing through the villages of New Rumley, the birthplace of General George Armstrong Custer, and Germano. In Germano, SR 646 runs concurrent with SR 9 for about 0.6 miles (0.97 km). East of Germano, the road intersects County Road 51 (formerly a grade-separated interchange) and an Ohi-Rail Corporation rail line.

At the Harrison–Jefferson County line, the route intersects County Road 39 in the community of Annapolis. SR 646 continues east through forest areas intersecting SR 152. The route gradually heads southeast towards Wintersville and ends at SR 43, 0.09 miles (140 m) north of the Wintersville village limits and 0.3 miles (0.48 km) north of an interchange with US 22.

== History ==
The first segment of SR 646 designated as a state highway was in 1937 on the route connecting Scio with its present eastern terminus at SR 43 near Wintersville. At its inception as a state route, most of the road was gravel-paved, though a short segment near Scio was asphalt-paved and another segment near the eastern terminus was dirt. More segments were paved until the 1960s when the road was fully paved.

The US 250-Scio segment was added to the state system in 1947. Since then, no major changes have occurred to the routing.

== Major intersections ==
County	Location	mi	km	Destinations	Notes
Harrison	Stock Township	0.00	0.00	US 250 – Cadiz, Dennison	
Harrison	Scio	6.53	10.51	SR 151 west (East Main Street) – Bowerston	Western end of SR 151 concurrency
Harrison	Scio	6.58	10.59	SR 151 east – Jewett	Eastern end of SR 151 concurrency
Harrison	German Township	14.81	23.83	SR 9 north – Carrollton	Western end of SR 9 concurrency
Harrison	German Township	15.40	24.78	SR 9 south – Cadiz	Eastern end of SR 9 concurrency
Jefferson	Salem Township	24.63	39.64	SR 152 – Richmond, Broadacre	
Jefferson	Island Creek Township	28.78	46.32	SR 43 – Richmond, Steubenville	
1.000 mi = 1.609 km; 1.000 km = 0.621 mi: Concurrency terminus
