= Puskarich Public Library System =

- Location: Cadiz, Ohio
- Established: 1880
- Branches: 2

Access and use
- Circulation: 190,000
- Population served: 13,568 (Harrison Hills City School District)

Other information
- Budget: $510,000
- Director: Sandi Thompson
- Employees: 16
- Website: harrison.lib.oh.us

The Puskarich Public Library System (PPL) is a rural, public library serving Harrison County, Ohio. The library also houses the Harrison County History of Coal Museum.

The system has two branch libraries: Clark Memorial Branch Library in Freeport, Ohio, and the Scio Branch Library in Scio, Ohio.

== Overview ==
Currently, the Puskarich Public Library System consists of three service outlets. The main library is in Cadiz, and branch locations are in Freeport and Scio.

On March 6, 1880, in Cadiz, Ohio, a meeting was held to establish a public library; and in April, an upstairs room in A. J. McDonald's new building was rented on North Main Street. Nancy Dewey donated $1000.00 and an additional $1500.00 raised by public subscription. The library was opened to subscribers for the sum of $100 per year in the Fall of 1880.

In 1895, the library was moved to the Harrison County Courthouse. A few years after in 1910, the membership fee was eliminated and control was given to the Board of Education. Since December 1935, it has been designated as a school district library with its own governing Board. Following a nearly half million dollar fundraising campaign, the Cadiz Public Library was renamed the Puskarich Public Library when the new main library building was erected at Cadiz in 1986.

== Homebound Library Service ==
Homebound Library Service is available to any resident who is unable to visit the library due to: visual disabilities, short or long term illness, or other physical challenges.

== Adult Programs ==
Free adult programs, including computer classes, are offered to the public every month.

== Clark Memorial Branch Library ==
The Clark Memorial Branch Library is located in Freeport, Ohio. This branch services Freeport, Tippecanoe, Deersville, Piedmont, Moorefield and surrounding areas. Summer Reading programs as well as a variety of programs for teens, families, and adults are also provided.

The Clark Memorial Branch Library was established in 1990 and currently has 1,265 patrons. The Friends of the Clark Memorial Branch Library was also organized in 1990 and remains an active support group for the library.

== Scio Branch Library ==
The Scio Branch Library is located in Scio, Ohio. It services Scio, Jewett, Bowerston, rural Carrollton County and surrounding areas.

== Ebooks ==
The Puskarich Public Library System offers eBooks, Overdrive Music and Overdrive WMA Audiobooks. Some of the available collections include Juvenile/Adult Fiction, Non-Fiction, Biographies and Autobiographies, Audio Books, MP3 Audiobooks, and Music.

== Local History & Genealogy ==
The Genealogy & Local History Room at the Puskarich Public Library contains volumes of Harrison County materials along with materials from the neighboring counties of Belmont, Jefferson, Tuscarawas, Gurnsey, and Carroll. They also have surname and local history files.
