= Ohio State Route 152 =

State highway in Jefferson County, Ohio, US

State Route 152

Route information
- Maintained by ODOT
- Length: 26.38 mi (42.45 km)
- Existed: 1923–present

Southern section
- Length: 6.18 mi (9.95 km)
- South end: SR 150 in Dillonvale
- North end: SR 151 in Smithfield

Northern section
- Length: 20.20 mi (32.51 km)
- South end: US 22 in Bloomingdale
- North end: SR 7 in Empire

Location
- Country: United States
- State: Ohio
- Counties: Jefferson

Highway system
- Ohio State Highway System; Interstate; US; State; Scenic
← SR 151	→ SR 153

State Route 152 (SR 152) is the designation for two segments of a state highway in Jefferson County, Ohio. The southern segment, which is 6.18 miles (9.95 km) long, runs from SR 150 in Dillonvale to SR 151 in Smithfield. The northern segment, which is 20.20 miles (32.51 km) long, runs from an interchange with U.S. Route 22 (US 22) in Bloomingdale to SR 7 in Empire.

== Route description ==
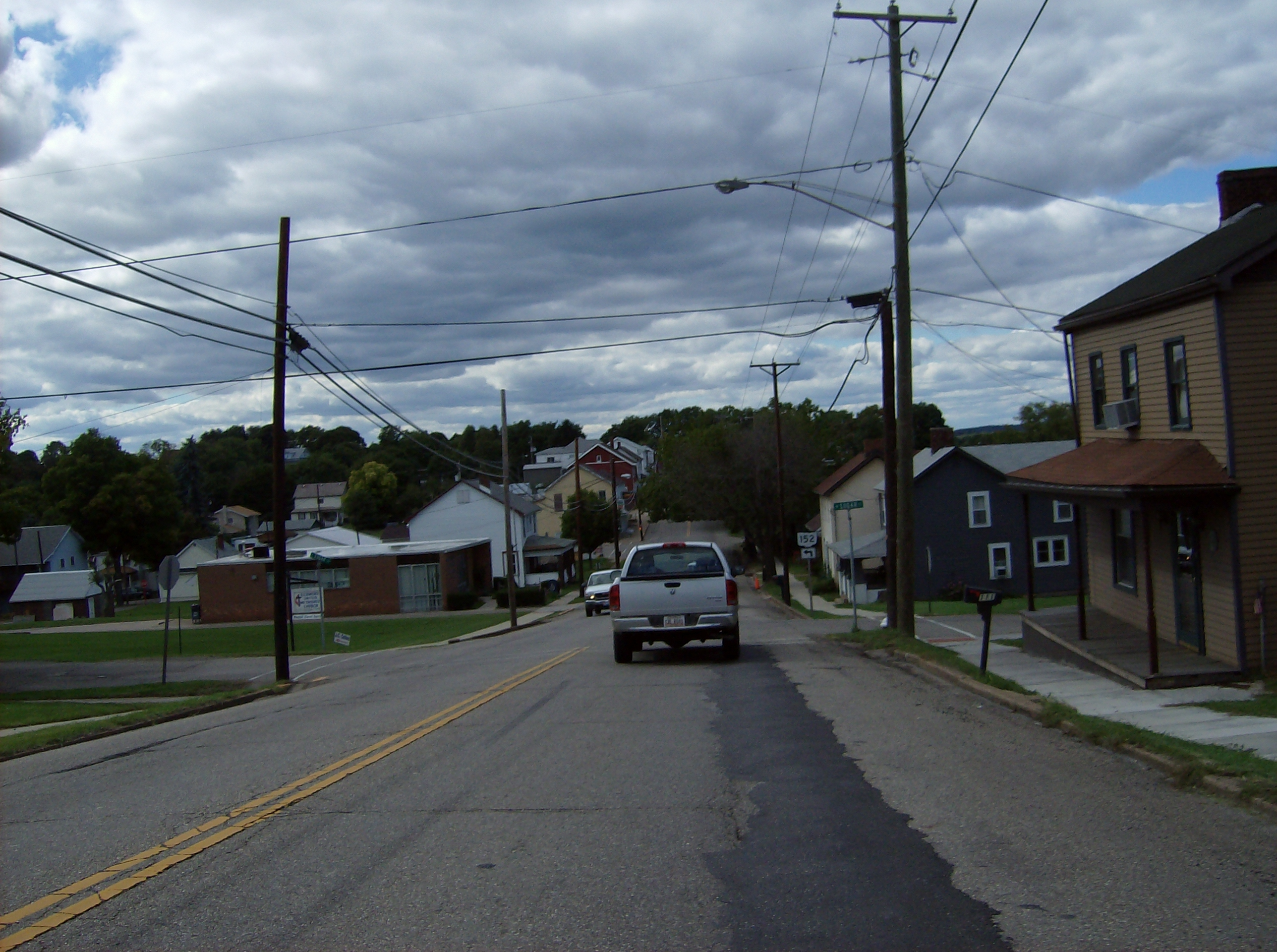
Looking west along the SR 43–SR 152 concurrency in Richmond

Both segments of SR 152 wholly consist of two-lane roads—one lane in each direction. No part of SR 152 in included in the National Highway System.

The southern segment of the route begins in the village of Dillonvale at an intersection with SR 150 (Smithfield Street). Immediately, SR 152 heads northwest to cross Piney Fork. The road then parallels the creek as it exits Dillonvale to enter Smithfield Township. It later exits the Piney Fork valley to ascend to a ridge away from the creek. Through this area, single-family houses line both sides of the road. After following the ridgeline for about two miles (3.2 km), SR 152 descends to a valley formed by the Dry Fork southwest of Smithfield. The road soon enters the Smithfield village limits and it heads northeast through the mostly residential neighborhood on Main Street. After descending another hill, this segment of SR 152 ends at an intersection with SR 151 on the north side of the village.

The northern segment starts at its southern end at a diamond interchange with US 22 partially in the village Bloomingdale and Wayne Township. South of the interchange, Steubenville Street, the former alignment of US 22 as evidenced by its county road number, Jefferson County Road 22A (CR 22A). SR 152 heads northeast through rolling terrain with few houses and some agricultural businesses. At the next intersection with CR 22A, SR 152 turns off the through road and descends on a winding road to cross Cross Creek and a Columbus and Ohio River Railroad. The road ascends to a ridge line (Quaker Ridge) on a winding road that heads through a mix of forest, open space, and small houses. The road enters Salem Township, treks to the north-northwest, and has an intersection with SR 646. North of this intersection, SR 152 begins to curve to the northeast and enters the village of Richmond on Walnut Street. At the top of a hill, SR 152 reaches Main Street which also carries SR 43. The two highways form a concurrency and travel together southeast ascending a hill. After two blocks, SR 152 turns onto Lisbon Street to continue climbing a hill out of the village.

SR 152 exits the Richmond to continue northeast through Salem Township, Island Creek Township (where it passes the Edison High School campus), and Knox Township. This portion of the road features few homes lining the road, mostly a mix of open space (including some farmland) and forest. At a former strip mine, the road begins to curve to the east and has a 0.9-mile-long (1.4 km) concurrency with SR 213. The easternmost intersection with SR 213 is in the unincorporated community of Knoxville where a small cluster of homes and a fire station are present. SR 152 heads northeast through the community of Sugar Grove where there are some homes that line the road. At an intersection with CR 68 adjacent to a Methodist church's cemetery, SR 152 curves to the east and begins a long 500-foot (150 m) descent into the village of Empire. About halfway downhill, the road begins to parallel Jeremy Run. At the bottom of the slope, the road, which is known as Stewart Street in Empire, crosses a Norfolk Southern railroad and travels for one block through a residential neighborhood. After the one block, the road reaches an interchange with SR 7. This interchange incorporates local roads to facilitate some movements to and from SR 7. SR 152 officially ends at the top of the northbound entrance ramp to SR 7, about 100 feet (30 m) from the Ohio River.

== History ==
The northern segment of SR 152 from Bloomingdale to Empire was first designated in 1923. However, a highway numbered SR 378 followed a similar alignment from 1916 to 1923. The modern-day southern segment of SR 152 from Dillonvale and Smithfield was designated SR 333 by 1932. By 1937, SR 152 was extended south to Smithfield and by 1938, SR 152 took over the entire alignment of SR 333 and traveled continuously from Dillonvale to Empire. Between 1942 and 1944, the segment between Smithfield and US 22, which was a gravel and earth-surfaced road, was removed from the State Highway System. With the exception of a one-and-a-half-mile-long (2.4 km) extension of the northern segment towards Bloomingdale when the US 22 freeway opened between 1969 and 1971, the two segments of SR 152 have remained unchanged since.

== Major intersections ==
The entire route is in Jefferson County.

Location	mi	km	Destinations	Notes
Dillonvale	0.00	0.00	SR 150 (Smithfield Street) – Rayland, Mount Pleasant	
Smithfield	6.18	9.95	SR 151 (Wood Street / New Alexandria Road) – Hopedale, Mingo Junction	
Gap in route
Bloomingdale	6.18– 6.44	9.95– 10.36	US 22 – Cadiz, Steubenville	Interchange
Salem Township	12.37	19.91	SR 646 – Wintersville, Germano	
Richmond	14.36	23.11	SR 43 west (West Main Street) / North Walnut Street – Carrollton	Southern end of SR 43 concurrency
Richmond	14.53	23.38	SR 43 east (East Main Street) – Steubenville	Northern end of SR 43 concurrency
Knox Township	21.09	33.94	SR 213 north – Hammondsville	Southern end of SR 213 concurrency
Knox Township	21.96	35.34	SR 213 south – Steubenville	Northern end of SR 213 concurrency
Empire	26.16– 26.38	42.10– 42.45	SR 7 – Steubenville, East Liverpool	Interchange
1.000 mi = 1.609 km; 1.000 km = 0.621 mi: Concurrency terminus
