= Athens Township, Ohio =

Athens Township, Ohio, may refer to:

- Athens Township, Athens County, Ohio
- Athens Township, Harrison County, Ohio
