= Stock Township, Ohio =

Stock Township, Ohio may refer to:

- Stock Township, Harrison County, Ohio
- Stock Township, Noble County, Ohio
