= Moorefield Township, Ohio =

Moorefield Township, Ohio may refer to:

- Moorefield Township, Clark County, Ohio
- Moorefield Township, Harrison County, Ohio
