= Broadacre, Ohio =

- Unincorporated community
- Location within Ohio
- Coordinates: 40°21′58″N 80°46′59″W
- Country: United States
- State: Ohio
- Counties: Jefferson
- Elevation: 856 ft (261 m)
- Time zone: UTC-5 (Eastern (EST))
  - Summer (DST): UTC-4 (EDT)
- ZIP code: 43944
- Area code: 740
- GNIS feature ID: 1062666

Broadacre (previously known as Creswell and Skelly's Station) is an unincorporated community in Wayne Township, Jefferson County, Ohio, United States. It is located about 2.5 miles (4.0 km) northeast of Bloomingdale at the intersection of Ohio State Route 152 and Township Route 166.

== History ==
Nathan M. Grew built the first mill in Wayne township in this location on Cross Creek. When the railroad came through, a station was built here called Creswell, and the community was known as such. The Creswell Post Office was established on June 10, 1869. Around the turn of the century, the name of the community was possibly called Skelley, but later changed to Broadacre. The name of the post office was changed to Broadacre Post Office on June 15, 1915, and it was later discontinued on August 31, 1948. Previous to 1951, the Pennsylvania Railroad was operating a passenger station, and later a freight terminal, at the "Broadacre Station" location, and as of 1962, the USGS officially recognized the name of the community as Broadacre. In 1990, the community was described as a hamlet.
