= Georgetown, Harrison County, Ohio =

Georgetown, Ohio
- Unincorporated community
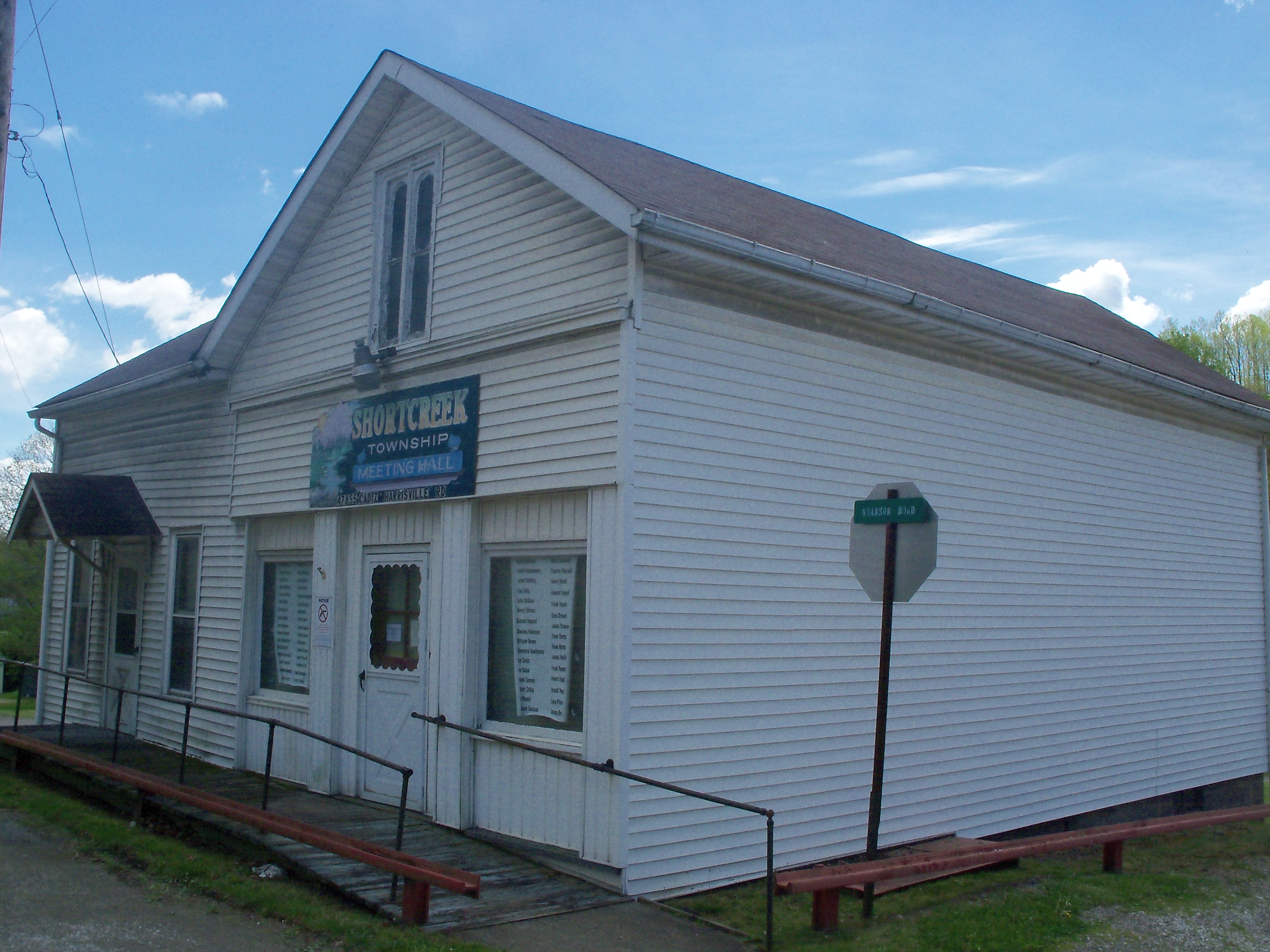
- Short Creek Township Meeting Hall on U.S. Route 250

- Location within Ohio
- Coordinates: 40°12′27″N 80°55′14″W
- Country: United States
- State: Ohio
- Counties: Harrison
- Elevation: 971 ft (296 m)
- Time zone: UTC-5 (Eastern (EST))
  - Summer (DST): UTC-4 (EDT)
- ZIP code: 43160
- Area code: 740
- GNIS feature ID: 1064713

Georgetown is an unincorporated community in Short Creek Township, Harrison County, Ohio, United States. It is located west of Adena at the intersection of Cadiz-Harrisville Road (U.S. Route 250) and Georgetown Road (County Route 41).

== History ==
Georgetown was platted in 1814 by George Riggle, and named for him.
