= Franklin Township, Harrison County, Ohio =

Township in Ohio, US

- Township
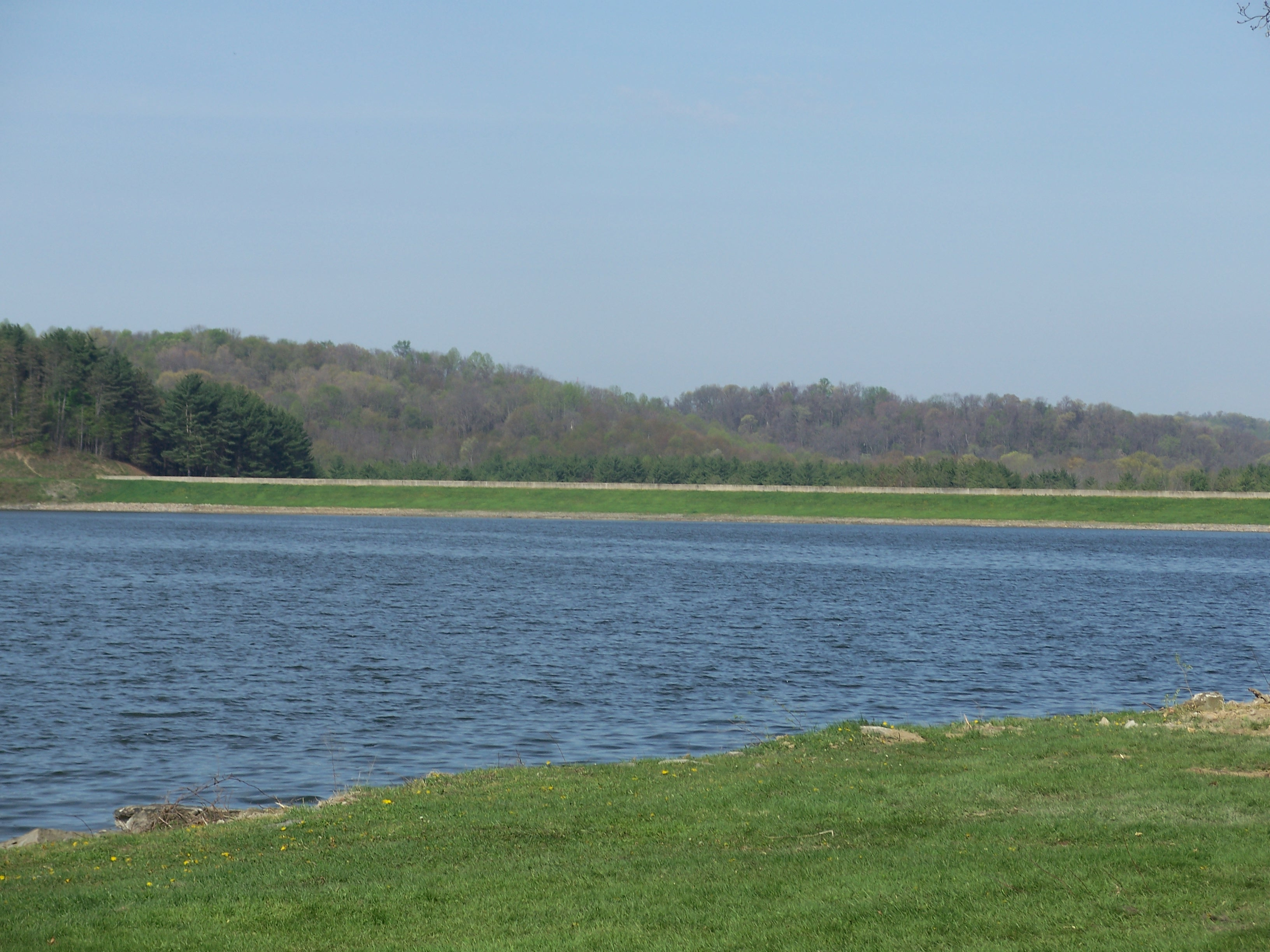
- Dam at Tappan Lake

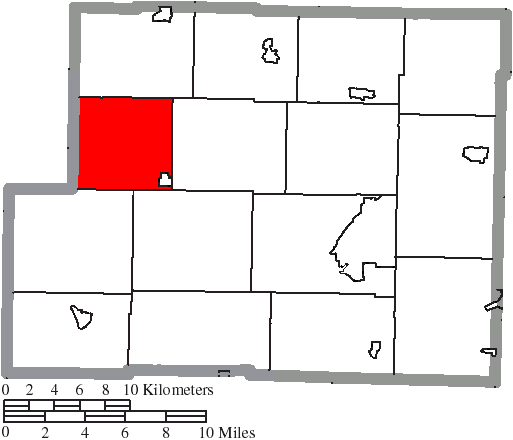
- Location of Franklin Township in Harrison County
- Coordinates: 40°19′54″N 81°13′6″W
- Country: United States
- State: Ohio
- County: Harrison

Area
  - Total: 22.4 sq mi (58.0 km^{2})
  - Land: 20.5 sq mi (53.0 km^{2})
  - Water: 1.9 sq mi (5.0 km^{2})
- Elevation: 1,142 ft (348 m)

Population (2020)
  - Total: 517
  - Density: 25.3/sq mi (9.75/km^{2})
- Time zone: UTC-5 (Eastern (EST))
  - Summer (DST): UTC-4 (EDT)
- FIPS code: 39-28308
- GNIS feature ID: 1086274

Franklin Township is one of the fifteen townships of Harrison County, Ohio, United States. As of the 2020 census the population was 517.

== Geography ==
Located in the western part of the county, it borders the following townships:

- Monroe Township - north
- Stock Township - east
- Nottingham Township - southeast
- Washington Township - southwest
- Rush Township, Tuscarawas County - west
- Mill Township, Tuscarawas County - northwest

The village of Deersville is located in southeastern Franklin Township.

== Name and history ==
It is one of twenty-one Franklin Townships statewide.

== Government ==
The township is governed by a three-member board of trustees, who are elected in November of odd-numbered years to a four-year term beginning on the following January 1. Two are elected in the year after the presidential election and one is elected in the year before it. There is also an elected township fiscal officer, who serves a four-year term beginning on April 1 of the year after the election, which is held in November of the year before the presidential election. Vacancies in the fiscal officership or on the board of trustees are filled by the remaining trustees.
