= Stock Township, Harrison County, Ohio =

Township in Ohio, US

- Township
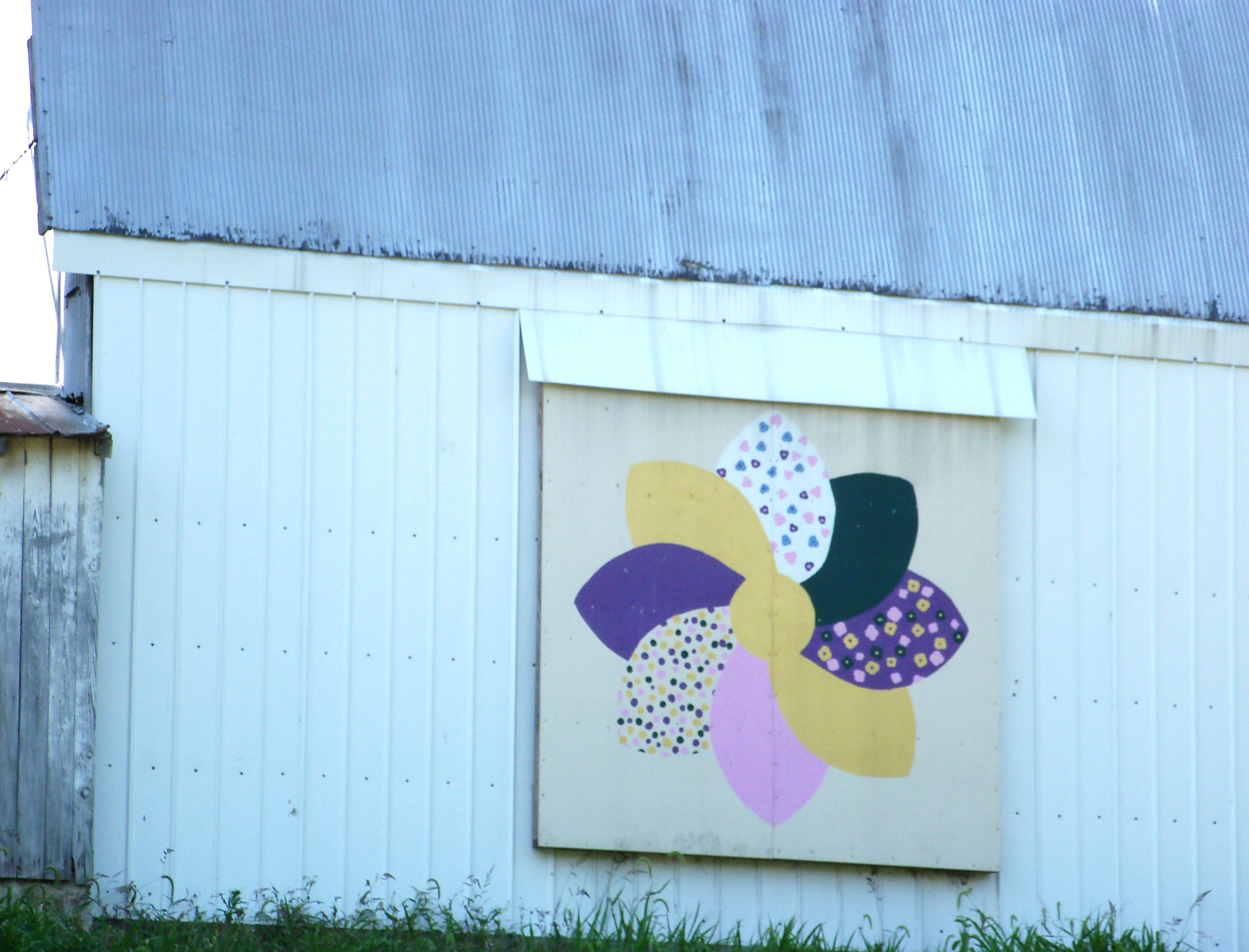
- A decorated barn near Tappan Lake on Ohio State Route 646

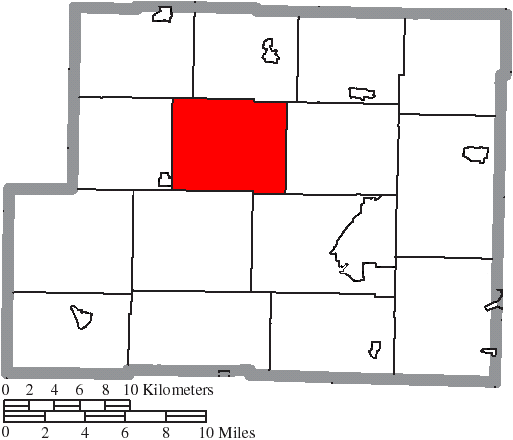
- Location of Stock Township in Harrison County
- Coordinates: 40°19′53″N 81°7′39″W
- Country: United States
- State: Ohio
- County: Harrison

Area
  - Total: 25.8 sq mi (66.8 km^{2})
  - Land: 24.6 sq mi (63.8 km^{2})
  - Water: 1.2 sq mi (3.0 km^{2})
- Elevation: 1,050 ft (320 m)

Population (2020)
  - Total: 439
  - Density: 17.8/sq mi (6.88/km^{2})
- Time zone: UTC-5 (Eastern (EST))
  - Summer (DST): UTC-4 (EDT)
- FIPS code: 39-74724
- GNIS feature ID: 1086284

Stock Township is one of the fifteen townships of Harrison County, Ohio, United States. The 2020 census found 439 people in the township.

== Geography ==
Located in the north central part of the county, it borders the following townships:

- North Township - north
- Archer Township - east
- Cadiz Township - southeast
- Nottingham Township - southwest
- Franklin Township - west
- Monroe Township - northwest

No municipalities are located in Stock Township.

== Name and history ==
Statewide, the only other Stock Township is located in Noble County.

== Government ==
The township is governed by a three-member board of trustees, who are elected in November of odd-numbered years to a four-year term beginning on the following January 1. Two are elected in the year after the presidential election and one is elected in the year before it. There is also an elected township fiscal officer, who serves a four-year term beginning on April 1 of the year after the election, which is held in November of the year before the presidential election. Vacancies in the fiscal officership or on the board of trustees are filled by the remaining trustees.
