= Cadiz Township, Ohio =

Township in Ohio, US

Cadiz Township, Harrison County, Ohio
- Township
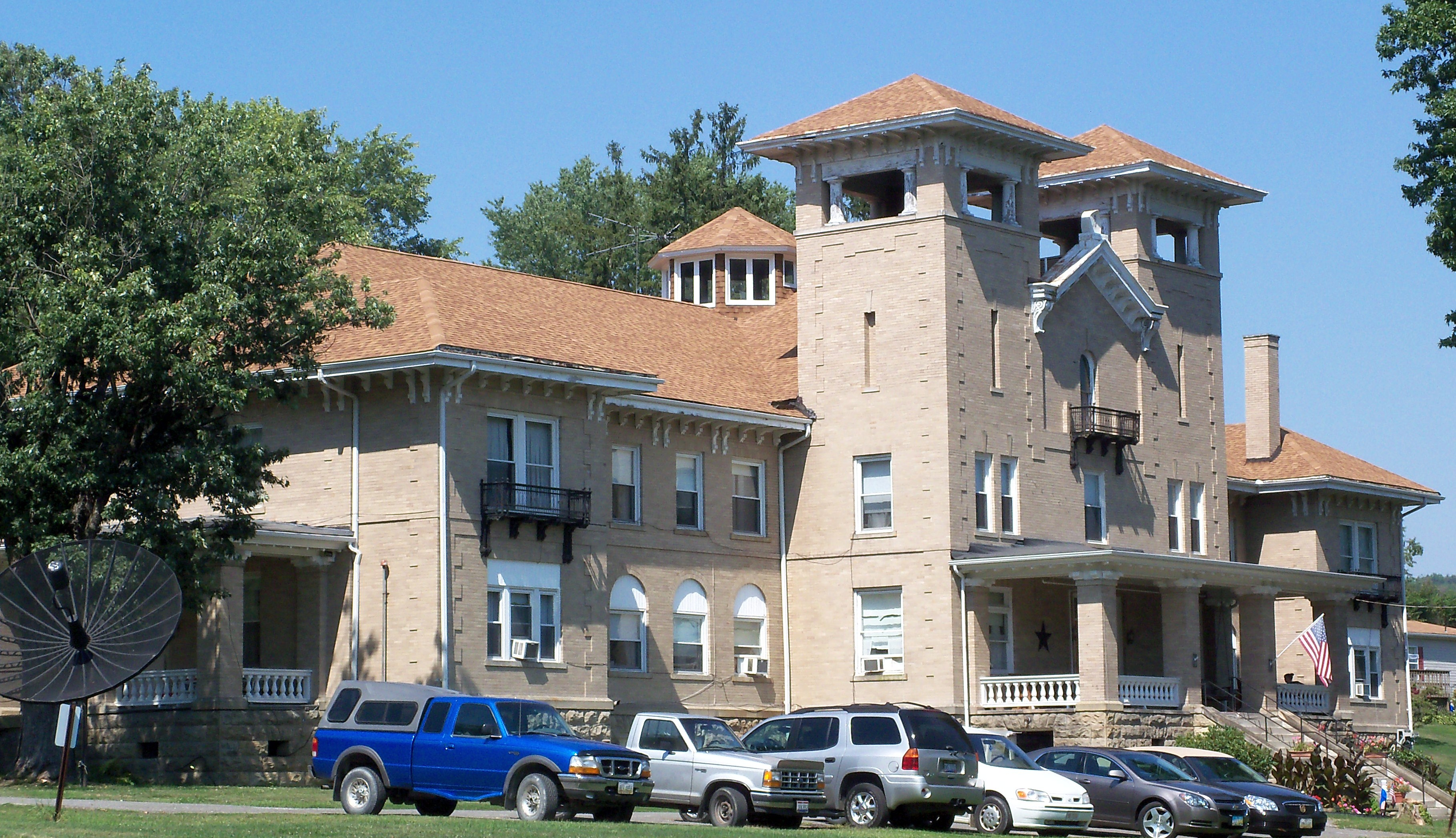
- The Harrison County Home sits on Route 250 in the township.

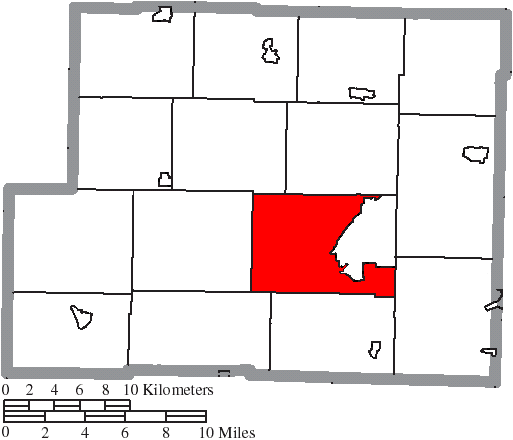
- Location of Cadiz Township in Harrison County
- Coordinates: 40°16′6″N 81°0′21″W
- Country: United States
- State: Ohio
- County: Harrison

Area
  - Total: 34.9 sq mi (90.3 km^{2})
  - Land: 34.3 sq mi (88.9 km^{2})
  - Water: 0.54 sq mi (1.4 km^{2})
- Elevation: 1,145 ft (349 m)

Population (2020)
  - Total: 3,387
  - Density: 98.7/sq mi (38.1/km^{2})
- Time zone: UTC-5 (Eastern (EST))
  - Summer (DST): UTC-4 (EDT)
- ZIP code: 43907
- Area code: 740
- FIPS code: 39-10814
- GNIS feature ID: 1086273

Cadiz Township is one of the fifteen townships of Harrison County, Ohio, United States. As of the 2020 census the population was 3,387.

== Geography ==
Located in the south central part of the county, it borders the following townships:

- Archer Township - north
- Green Township - northeast
- Short Creek Township - southeast
- Athens Township - south
- Moorefield Township - southwest
- Nottingham Township - west
- Stock Township - northwest

The village of Cadiz, the county seat of Harrison County, is located in eastern Cadiz Township.

== Name and history ==
It is the only Cadiz Township statewide.

== Government ==
The township is governed by a three-member board of trustees, who are elected in November of odd-numbered years to a four-year term beginning on the following January 1. Two are elected in the year after the presidential election and one is elected in the year before it. There is also an elected township fiscal officer, who serves a four-year term beginning on April 1 of the year after the election, which is held in November of the year before the presidential election. Vacancies in the fiscal officership or on the board of trustees are filled by the remaining trustees.
