= German Township, Ohio =

German Township, Ohio, may refer to:

- German Township, Auglaize County, Ohio
- German Township, Clark County, Ohio
- German Township, Fulton County, Ohio
- German Township, Harrison County, Ohio
- German Township, Montgomery County, Ohio
