= Archer Township, Ohio =

Township in Ohio, US

Archer Township, Harrison County, Ohio
- Township
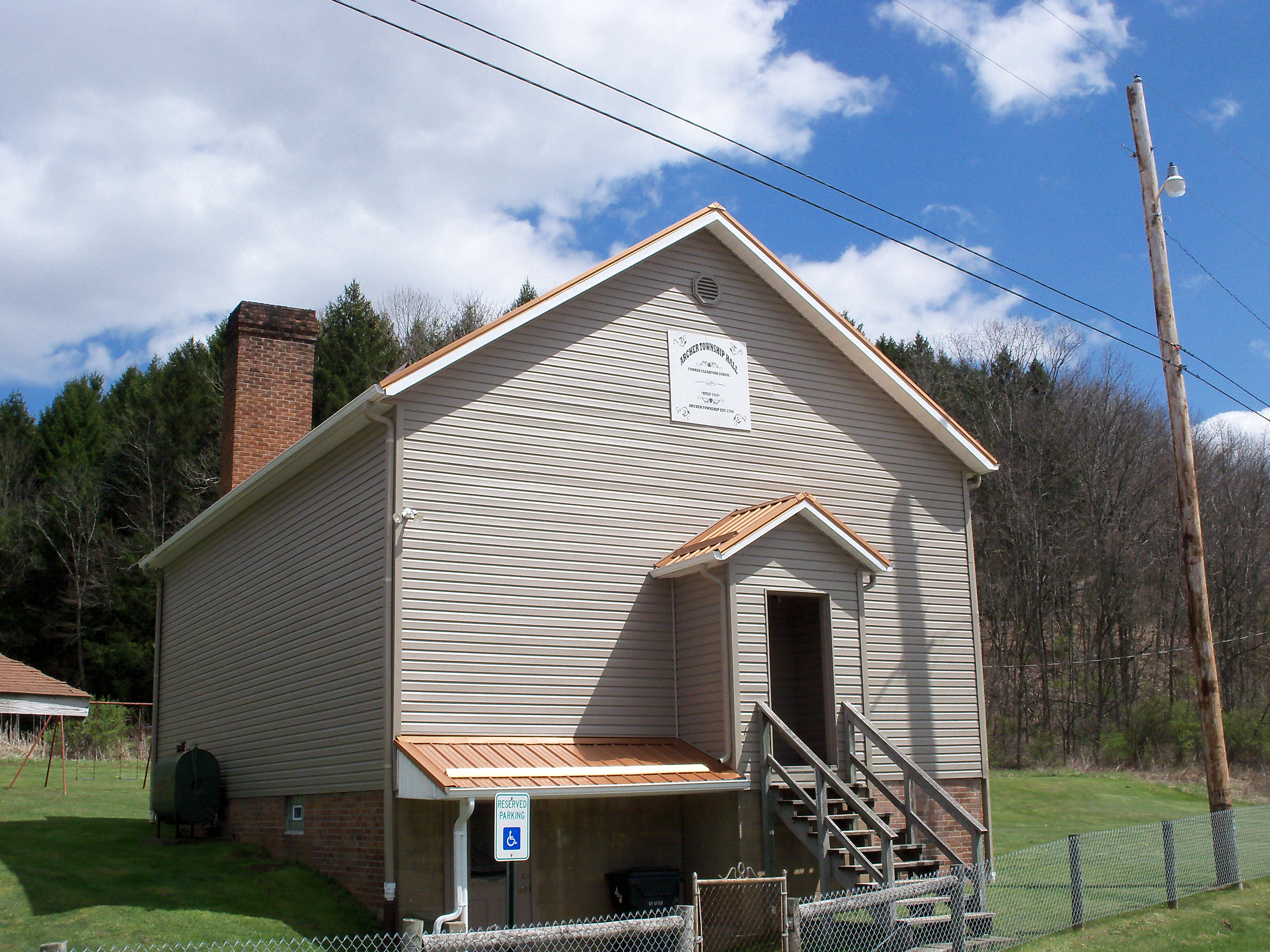
- Town Hall is housed in the former Clearfork School.

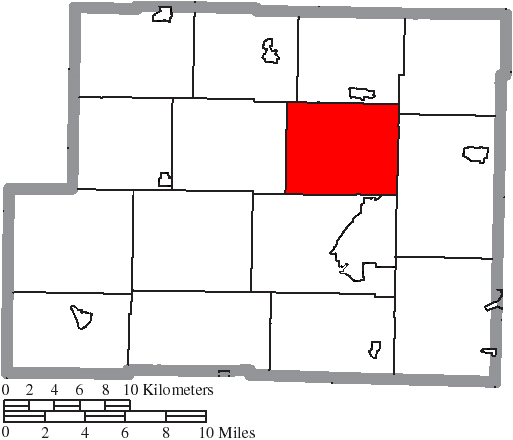
- Location of Archer Township in Harrison County
- Coordinates: 40°19′30″N 81°1′3″W
- Country: United States
- State: Ohio
- County: Harrison

Area
  - Total: 25.2 sq mi (65.3 km^{2})
  - Land: 25.2 sq mi (65.2 km^{2})
  - Water: 0.039 sq mi (0.1 km^{2})
- Elevation: 965 ft (294 m)

Population (2020)
  - Total: 327
  - Density: 13.0/sq mi (5.02/km^{2})
- Time zone: UTC-5 (Eastern (EST))
  - Summer (DST): UTC-4 (EDT)
- FIPS code: 39-02358
- GNIS feature ID: 1086271

Archer Township is one of the fifteen townships of Harrison County, Ohio, United States. As of the 2020 census the population was 327.

== Geography ==
Located in the north central part of the county, it borders the following townships:

- Rumley Township - north
- Green Township - east
- German Township - northeast
- Cadiz Township - south
- Stock Township - west
- North Township - northwest

No municipalities are located in Archer Township.

== Name and history ==
It is the only Archer Township statewide. It was established in 1799.

== Government ==
The township is governed by a three-member board of trustees, who are elected in November of odd-numbered years to a four-year term beginning on the following January 1. Two are elected in the year after the presidential election and one is elected in the year before it. There is also an elected township fiscal officer, who serves a four-year term beginning on April 1 of the year after the election, which is held in November of the year before the presidential election. Vacancies in the fiscal officership or on the board of trustees are filled by the remaining trustees.
