= Athens Township, Harrison County, Ohio =

Township in Ohio, US

- Township
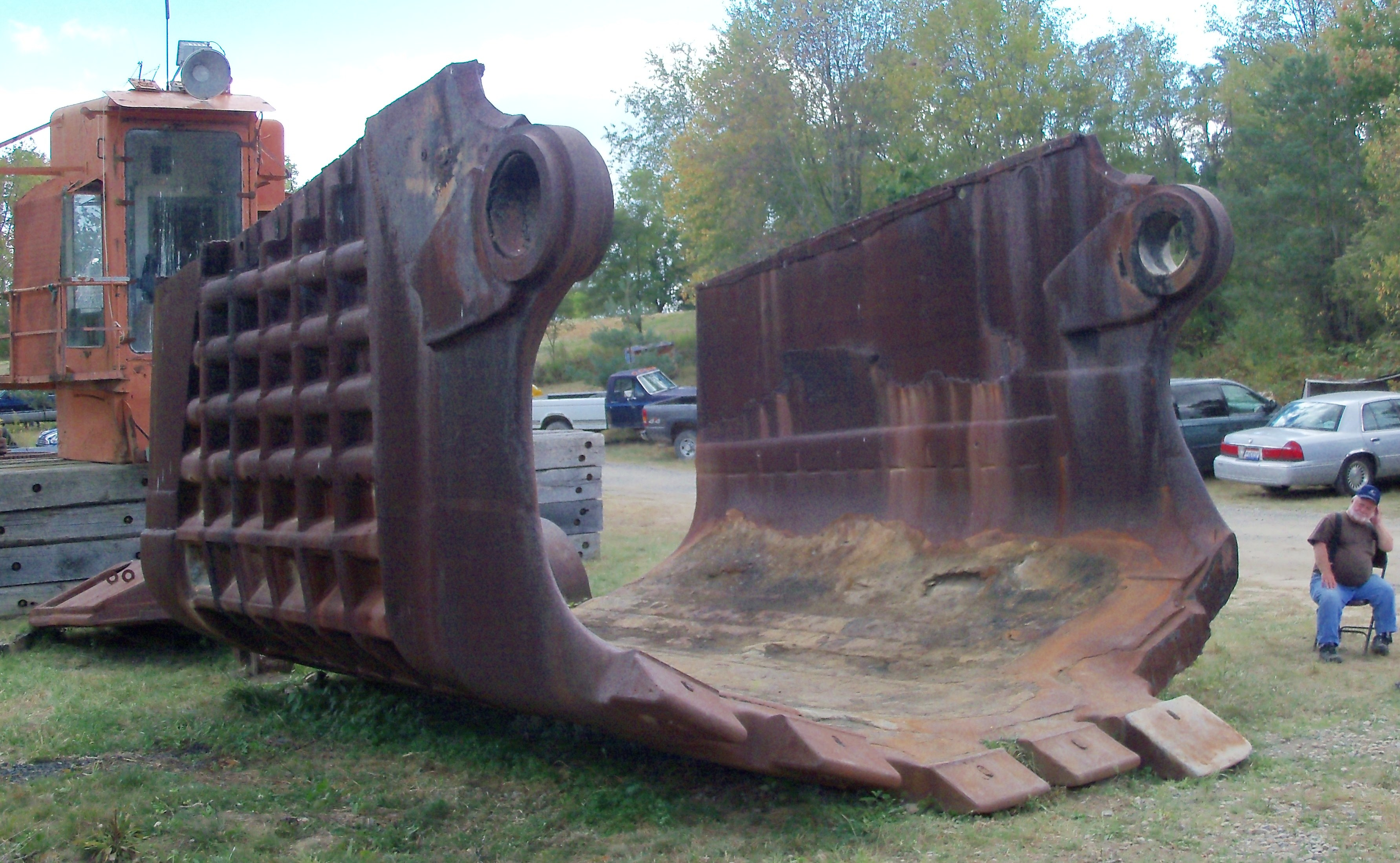
- Bucket and cab of The Silver Spade at Harrison Coal and Reclamation Park on Stumptown Road

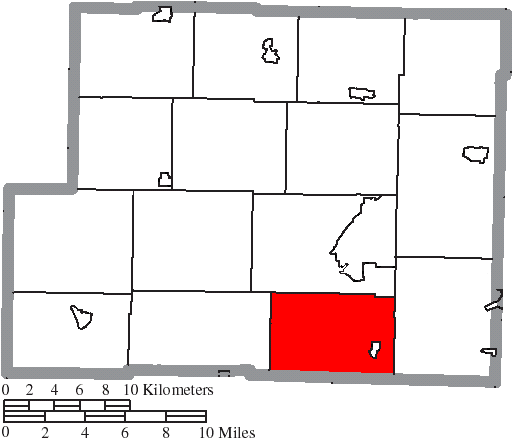
- Location of Athens Township in Harrison County
- Coordinates: 40°10′49″N 81°1′57″W
- Country: United States
- State: Ohio
- County: Harrison

Area
  - Total: 25.4 sq mi (65.9 km^{2})
  - Land: 25.1 sq mi (65.0 km^{2})
  - Water: 0.35 sq mi (0.9 km^{2})
- Elevation: 1,125 ft (343 m)

Population (2020)
  - Total: 390
  - Density: 16/sq mi (6.0/km^{2})
- Time zone: UTC-5 (Eastern (EST))
  - Summer (DST): UTC-4 (EDT)
- FIPS code: 39-02764
- GNIS feature ID: 1086272

Athens Township is one of the fifteen townships of Harrison County, Ohio, United States. As of the 2020 census the population was 390.

== Geography ==
Located in the southern part of the county, it borders the following townships:

- Cadiz Township - north
- Short Creek Township - east
- Wheeling Township, Belmont County - southeast
- Flushing Township, Belmont County - southwest
- Moorefield Township - west

The village of New Athens is located in southeastern Athens Township.

== Name and history ==
Statewide, the only other Athens Township is located in Athens County.

== Government ==
The township is governed by a three-member board of trustees, who are elected in November of odd-numbered years to a four-year term beginning on the following January 1. Two are elected in the year after the presidential election and one is elected in the year before it. There is also an elected township fiscal officer, who serves a four-year term beginning on April 1 of the year after the election, which is held in November of the year before the presidential election. Vacancies in the fiscal officership or on the board of trustees are filled by the remaining trustees.
