= East Cadiz, Ohio =

Unincorporated community in Ohio, U.S.

Coordinates: 40°18′13″N 80°56′56″W

East Cadiz is an unincorporated community in Harrison County, in the U.S. state of Ohio.

== History ==
East Cadiz lies east of the city of Cadiz, hence the name. A variant name was Greenough. A post office called Greenough was established in 1893, and remained in operation until 1914.
