= Nottingham Township, Harrison County, Ohio =

Township in Ohio, US

- Township
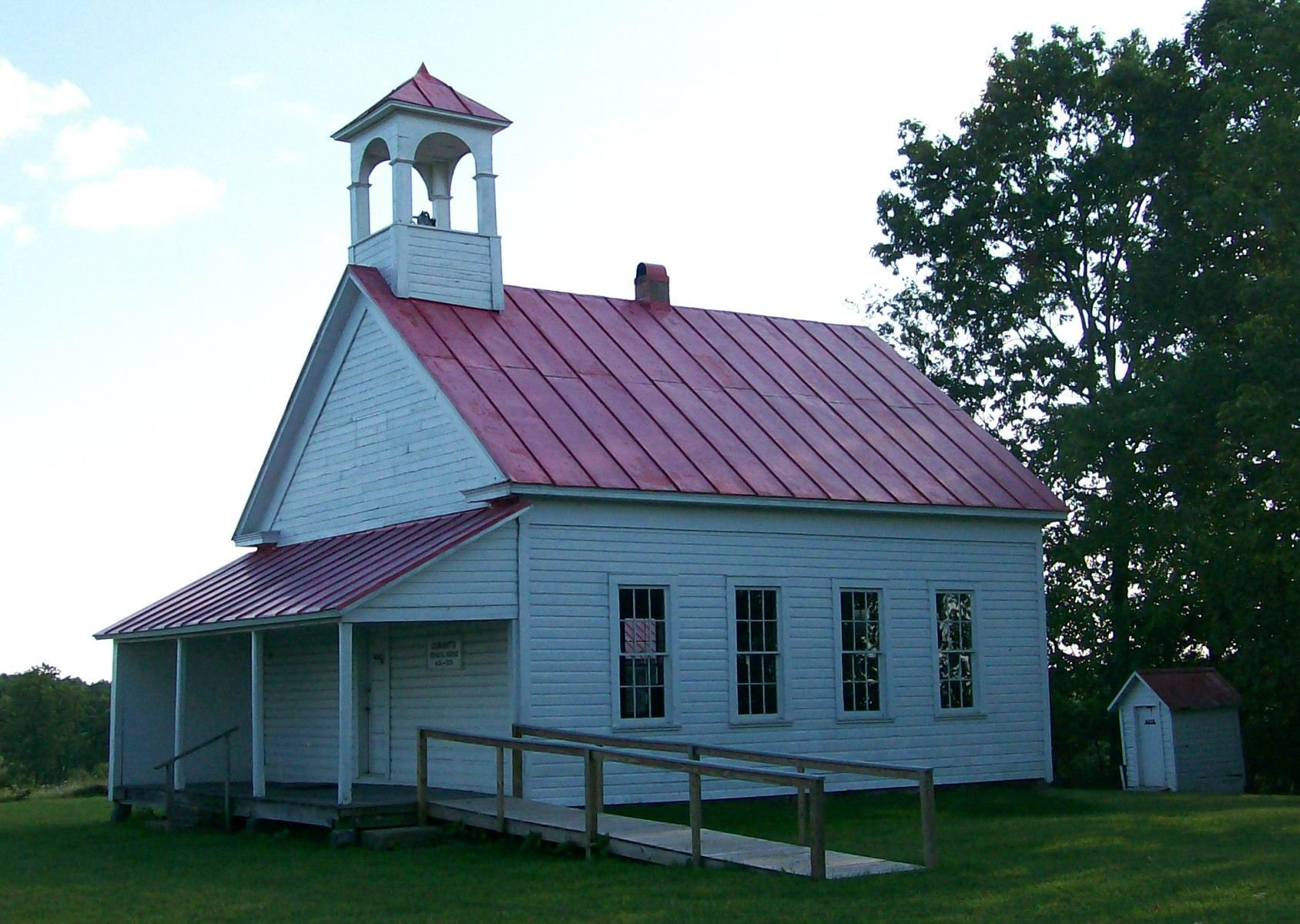
- Ourant's School on Ourant Road

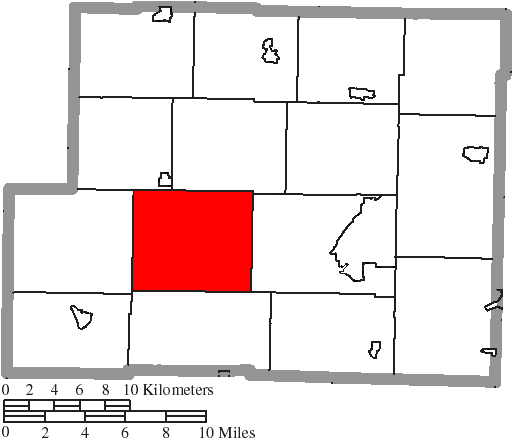
- Location of Nottingham Township in Harrison County
- Coordinates: 40°16′10″N 81°10′51″W
- Country: United States
- State: Ohio
- County: Harrison

Area
  - Total: 29.49 sq mi (76.38 km^{2})
  - Land: 28.20 sq mi (73.03 km^{2})
  - Water: 1.29 sq mi (3.35 km^{2})
- Elevation: 1,099 ft (335 m)

Population (2020)
  - Total: 296
  - Density: 10.5/sq mi (4.05/km^{2})
- Time zone: UTC-5 (Eastern (EST))
  - Summer (DST): UTC-4 (EDT)
- FIPS code: 39-57456
- GNIS feature ID: 1086281

Nottingham Township is one of the fifteen townships of Harrison County, Ohio, United States. As of the 2020 census the population was 296.

== Geography ==
Located in the south central part of the county, it borders the following townships:

- Stock Township - north
- Cadiz Township - east
- Moorefield Township - south
- Franklin Township - west
- Washington Township - northwest

No municipalities are located in Nottingham Township.

== Name and history ==
It is the only Nottingham Township statewide.

== Government ==
The township is governed by a three-member board of trustees, who are elected in November of odd-numbered years to a four-year term beginning on the following January 1. Two are elected in the year after the presidential election and one is elected in the year before it. There is also an elected township fiscal officer, who serves a four-year term beginning on April 1 of the year after the election, which is held in November of the year before the presidential election. Vacancies in the fiscal officership or on the board of trustees are filled by the remaining trustees.
