= Laceyville, Ohio =

Former community in Harrison County, Ohio, US

Coordinates: 40°19′20″N 81°07′54″W

Laceyville is a former community in Harrison County, Ohio, United States.

== History ==
A post office was established at Laceyville in 1850, and remained in operation until being discontinued in 1907. The community was named for Major John S. Lacey.

The town site was permanently submerged when Tappan Lake was created in the 1930s.
