= Green Township, Harrison County, Ohio =

Township in Ohio, US

- Township
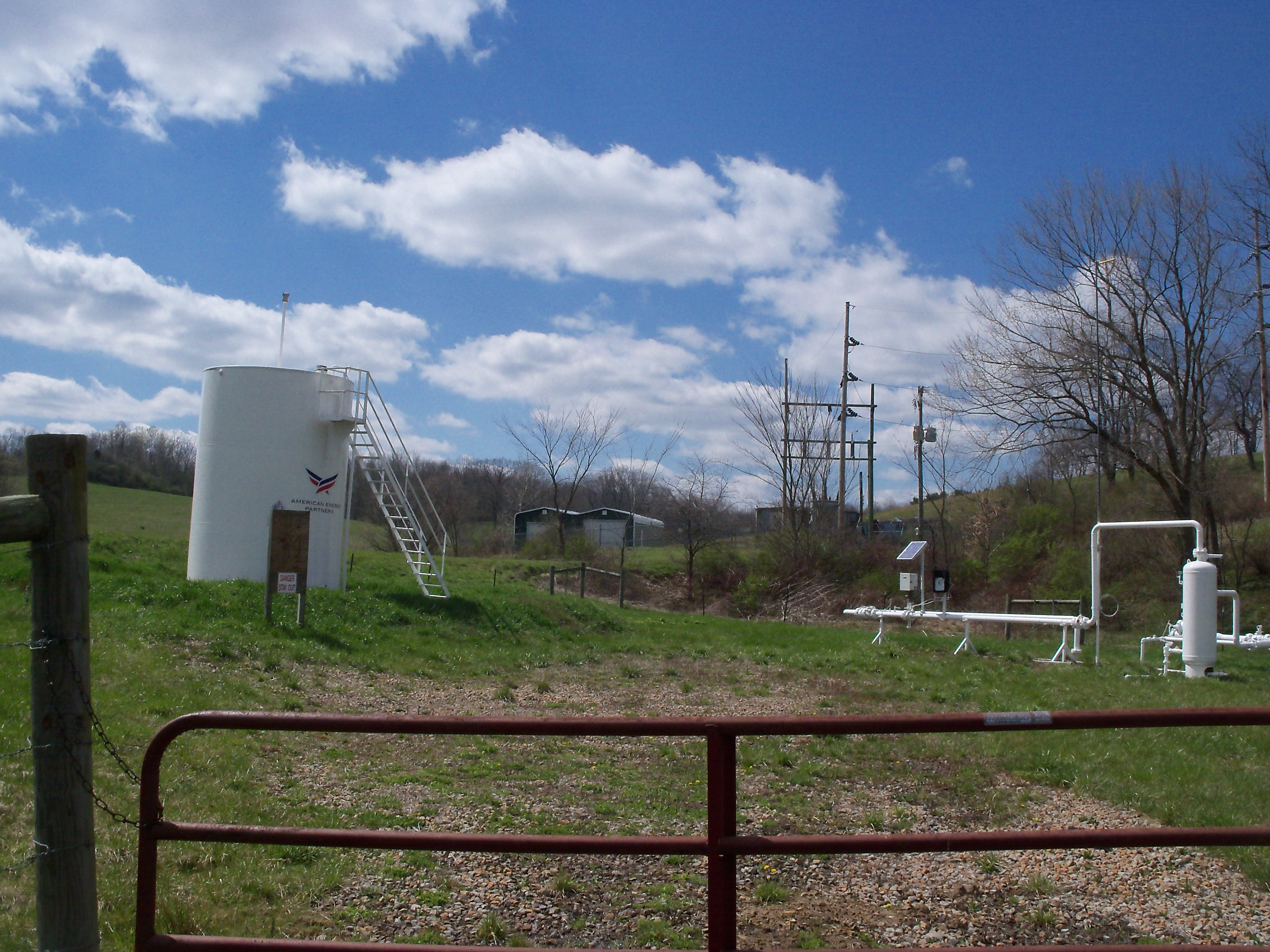
- Utica Shale oil and gas is extracted in Green Township.

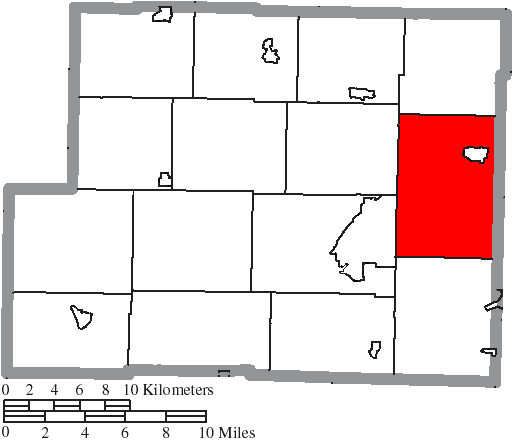
- Location of Green Township in Harrison County
- Coordinates: 40°19′23″N 80°55′24″W
- Country: United States
- State: Ohio
- County: Harrison

Area
  - Total: 35.62 sq mi (92.26 km^{2})
  - Land: 35.14 sq mi (91.02 km^{2})
  - Water: 0.48 sq mi (1.24 km^{2})
- Elevation: 1,198 ft (365 m)

Population (2020)
  - Total: 1,719
  - Density: 48.91/sq mi (18.89/km^{2})
- Time zone: UTC-5 (Eastern (EST))
  - Summer (DST): UTC-4 (EDT)
- FIPS code: 39-31766
- GNIS feature ID: 1086277

Green Township is one of the fifteen townships of Harrison County, Ohio, United States. As of the 2020 census the population was 1,719.

== Geography ==
Located in the eastern part of the county, it borders the following townships:

- German Township - north
- Wayne Township, Jefferson County - northeast
- Smithfield Township, Jefferson County - southeast
- Short Creek Township - south
- Cadiz Township - southwest
- Archer Township - northwest

The village of Hopedale is located in northeastern Green Township, and the unincorporated community of Pittsburgh Junction lies in the western part of the township.

== Name and history ==
It is one of sixteen Green Townships statewide.

== Government ==
The township is governed by a three-member board of trustees, who are elected in November of odd-numbered years to a four-year term beginning on the following January 1. Two are elected in the year after the presidential election and one is elected in the year before it. There is also an elected township fiscal officer, who serves a four-year term beginning on April 1 of the year after the election, which is held in November of the year before the presidential election. Vacancies in the fiscal officership or on the board of trustees are filled by the remaining trustees.
