= German Township, Harrison County, Ohio =

Township in Ohio, US

- Township
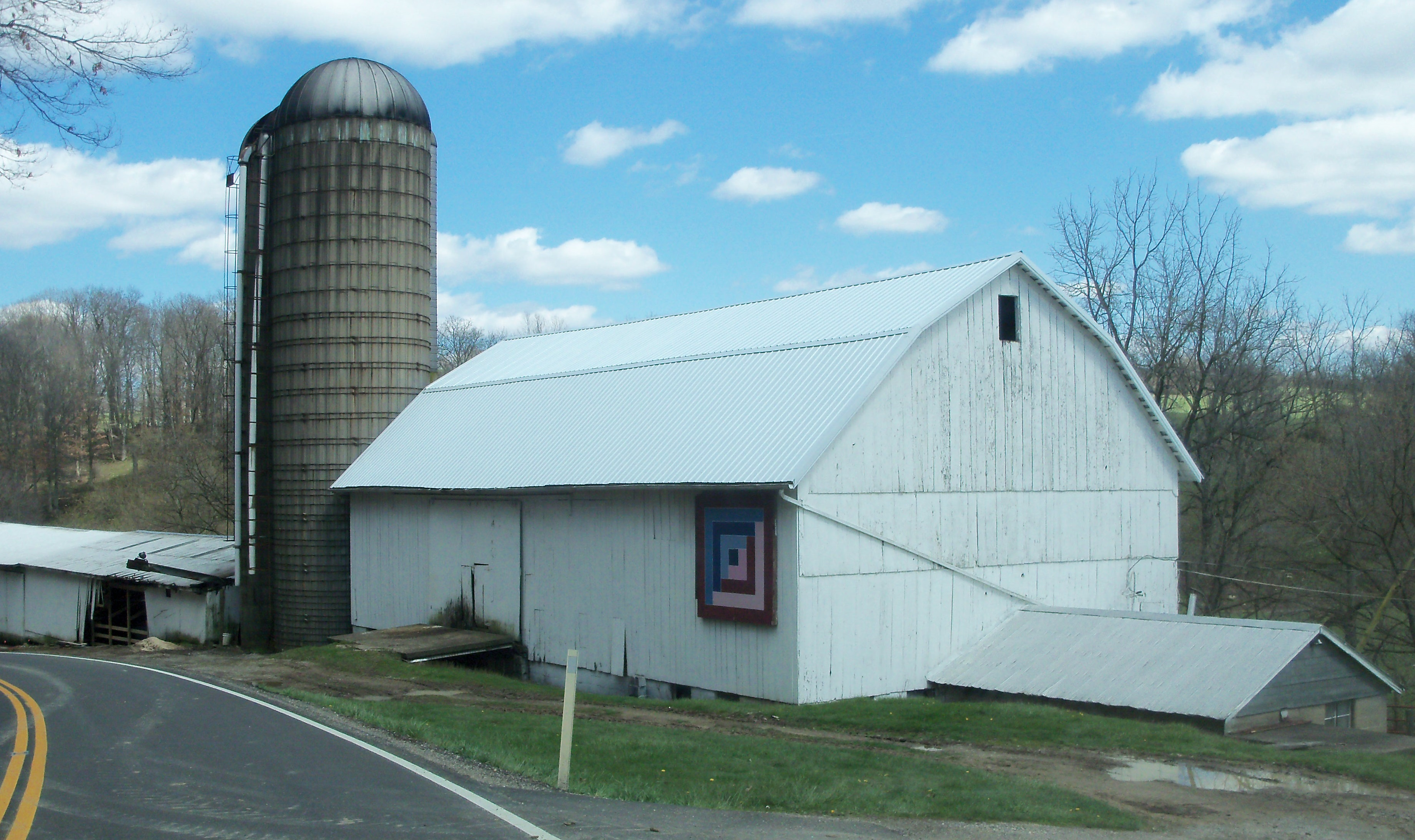
- Barn on State Route 646

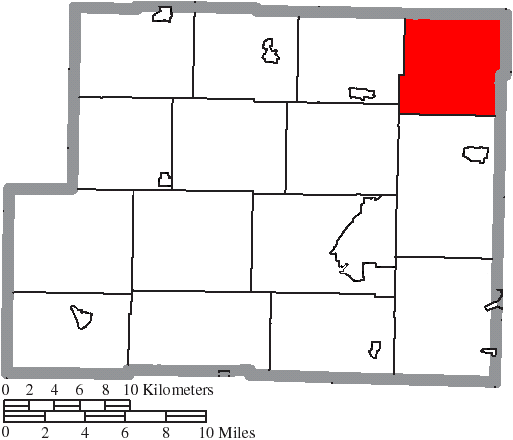
- Location of German Township in Harrison County
- Coordinates: 40°23′29″N 80°54′49″W
- Country: United States
- State: Ohio
- County: Harrison

Area
  - Total: 25.2 sq mi (65.3 km^{2})
  - Land: 25.1 sq mi (65.0 km^{2})
  - Water: 0.12 sq mi (0.3 km^{2})
- Elevation: 1,230 ft (375 m)

Population (2020)
  - Total: 702
  - Density: 28.0/sq mi (10.8/km^{2})
- Time zone: UTC-5 (Eastern (EST))
  - Summer (DST): UTC-4 (EDT)
- FIPS code: 39-29890
- GNIS feature ID: 1086276

German Township is one of the fifteen townships of Harrison County, Ohio, United States. As of the 2020 census the population was 702.

== Geography ==
Located in the northeastern corner of the county, it borders the following townships:

- Springfield Township, Jefferson County - north
- Salem Township, Jefferson County - northeast
- Wayne Township, Jefferson County - southeast
- Green Township - south
- Archer Township - southwest
- Rumley Township - west
- Loudon Township, Carroll County - northwest

No municipalities are located in German Township.

== Name and history ==
It is one of five German Townships statewide.

== Government ==
The township is governed by a three-member board of trustees, who are elected in November of odd-numbered years to a four-year term beginning on the following January 1. Two are elected in the year after the presidential election and one is elected in the year before it. There is also an elected township fiscal officer, who serves a four-year term beginning on April 1 of the year after the election, which is held in November of the year before the presidential election. Vacancies in the fiscal officership or on the board of trustees are filled by the remaining trustees.
