= Germano, Ohio =

Unincorporated community in Ohio, U.S.

Coordinates: 40°24′30″N 80°56′49″W

Germano is an unincorporated community in German Township, Harrison County, Ohio, United States. The community is served by the post office at Jewett, ZIP code 43986. It is located near the source of Jefferson Creek, a tributary of Conotton Creek. Germano is located on State Routes 9 and 646.

Germano was laid out in 1815.

== Education ==
Students attend the Harrison Hills City School District.
