= Moorefield, Ohio =

Unincorporated community in Ohio, U.S.

Coordinates: 40°11′59″N 81°10′15″W

Moorefield is an unincorporated community in Harrison County, in the U.S. state of Ohio.

== History ==
Moorefield was platted in 1815. The community derives its name from Michael Moore, one of the founders. A post office has been in operation at Moorefield since 1819.
