= Harrisville, Ohio =

- Village
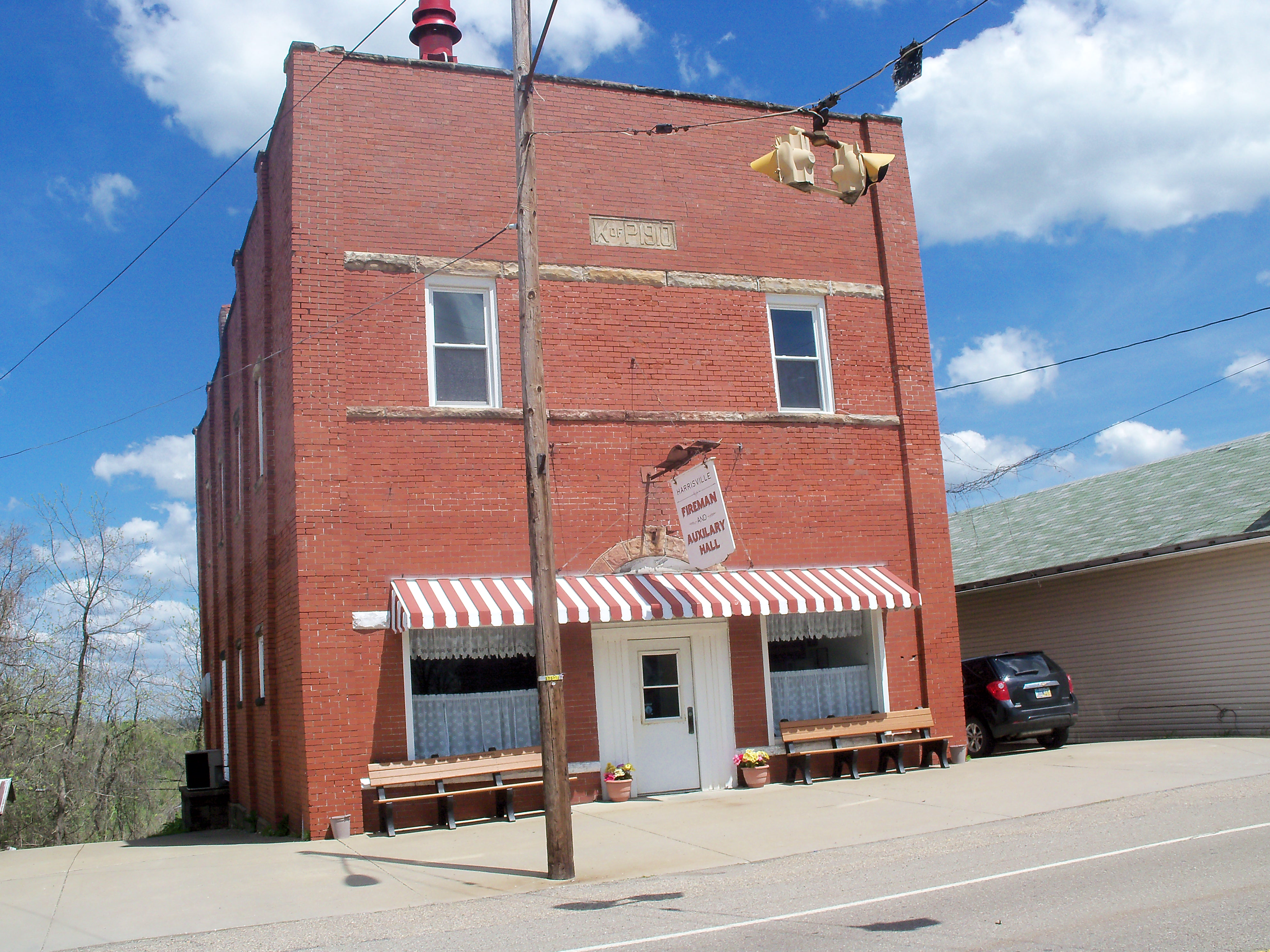
- The Fireman and Auxiliary Hall on U.S. Route 250

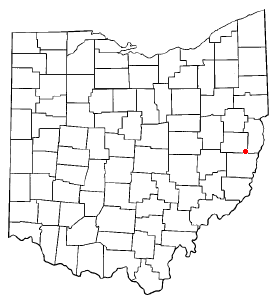
- Location of Harrisville, Ohio

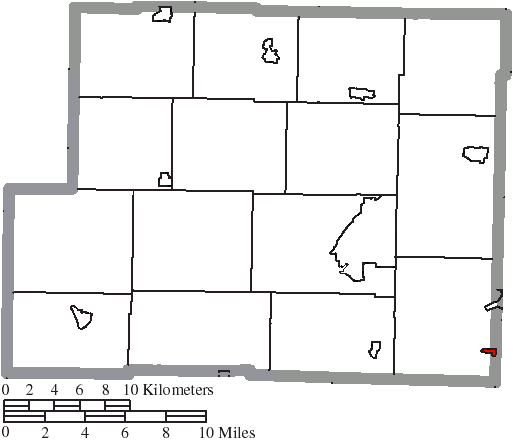
- Location of Harrisville in Harrison County
- Coordinates: 40°10′53″N 80°53′13″W
- Country: United States
- State: Ohio
- County: Harrison
- Township: Short Creek

Area
  - Total: 0.15 sq mi (0.39 km^{2})
  - Land: 0.15 sq mi (0.39 km^{2})
  - Water: 0 sq mi (0.00 km^{2})
- Elevation: 1,247 ft (380 m)

Population (2020)
  - Total: 179
  - Estimate (2023): 173
  - Density: 1,178.8/sq mi (455.12/km^{2})
- Time zone: UTC-5 (Eastern (EST))
  - Summer (DST): UTC-4 (EDT)
- ZIP code: 43974
- Area code: 740
- FIPS code: 39-34090
- GNIS feature ID: 2398255

Harrisville is a village in Short Creek Township, Harrison County, Ohio, United States. The population was 179 at the 2020 census.

== History ==
Harrisville was platted by John Wells, Thomas Gray, Store Hutchinson, and Robert Dutton on October 19, 1814. The plat was filed on January 9, 1815, with John Wells as proprietor. In 1834, local women made one of the first known demands for women's suffrage. A petition signed by thirty-five women called on Congress to abolish slavery in the District of Columbia, and for "immediate enfranchisement of every human being that shall tread this soil."

During Morgan's Raid, a Union victory in the Civil War in 1863, Confederate Brig. Gen. John Hunt Morgan traveled through Moorefield, Harrisville, New Athens, Smithfield, New Alexandria, Wintersville, Two Ridge, Richmond, East Springfield, Bergholz, and Monroeville on his way to defeat at the Battle of Salineville.

== Geography ==
According to the United States Census Bureau, the village has a total area of 0.15 square miles (0.39 km^{2}), all land.

== Demographics ==
Historical population
Census	Pop.	Note	%±
1850	300		—
1860	261		−13.0%
1870	258		−1.1%
1880	318		23.3%
1890	252		−20.8%
1900	256		1.6%
1910	364		42.2%
1920	356		−2.2%
1930	380		6.7%
1940	442		16.3%
1950	420		−5.0%
1960	343		−18.3%
1970	345		0.6%
1980	324		−6.1%
1990	308		−4.9%
2000	259		−15.9%
2010	235		−9.3%
2020	179		−23.8%
2023 (est.)	173	▼	−3.4%
U.S. Decennial Census

=== 2010 census ===
As of the census of 2010, there were 235 people, 99 households, and 66 families living in the village. The population density was 1,566.7 inhabitants per square mile (604.9/km^{2}). There were 120 housing units at an average density of 800.0 per square mile (308.9/km^{2}). The racial makeup of the village was 99.6% White and 0.4% from two or more races. Hispanic or Latino of any race were 0.9% of the population.

There were 99 households, of which 29.3% had children under the age of 18 living with them, 50.5% were married couples living together, 10.1% had a female householder with no husband present, 6.1% had a male householder with no wife present, and 33.3% were non-families. 30.3% of all households were made up of individuals, and 16.1% had someone living alone who was 65 years of age or older. The average household size was 2.37 and the average family size was 2.86.

The median age in the village was 41.2 years. 18.7% of residents were under the age of 18; 13.7% were between the ages of 18 and 24; 22.5% were from 25 to 44; 30.6% were from 45 to 64; and 14.5% were 65 years of age or older. The gender makeup of the village was 51.5% male and 48.5% female.

=== 2000 census ===
As of the census of 2000, there were 259 people, 107 households, and 66 families living in the village. The population density was 1,713.3 inhabitants per square mile (661.5/km^{2}). There were 121 housing units at an average density of 800.4 per square mile (309.0/km^{2}). The racial makeup of the village was 99.61% White and 0.39% Asian.

There were 107 households, out of which 33.6% had children under the age of 18 living with them, 49.5% were married couples living together, 8.4% had a female householder with no husband present, and 38.3% were non-families. 29.0% of all households were made up of individuals, and 15.9% had someone living alone who was 65 years of age or older. The average household size was 2.42 and the average family size was 3.08.

In the village, the population was spread out, with 24.3% under the age of 18, 5.4% from 18 to 24, 34.0% from 25 to 44, 17.8% from 45 to 64, and 18.5% who were 65 years of age or older. The median age was 38 years. For every 100 females there were 103.9 males. For every 100 females age 18 and over, there were 96.0 males.

The median income for a household in the village was $26,750, and the median income for a family was $38,438. Males had a median income of $31,563 versus $16,563 for females. The per capita income for the village was $13,732. About 3.3% of families and 5.7% of the population were below the poverty line, including none of those under the age of eighteen and 10.9% of those 65 or over.
