= North Township, Harrison County, Ohio =

Township in Ohio, US

- Township
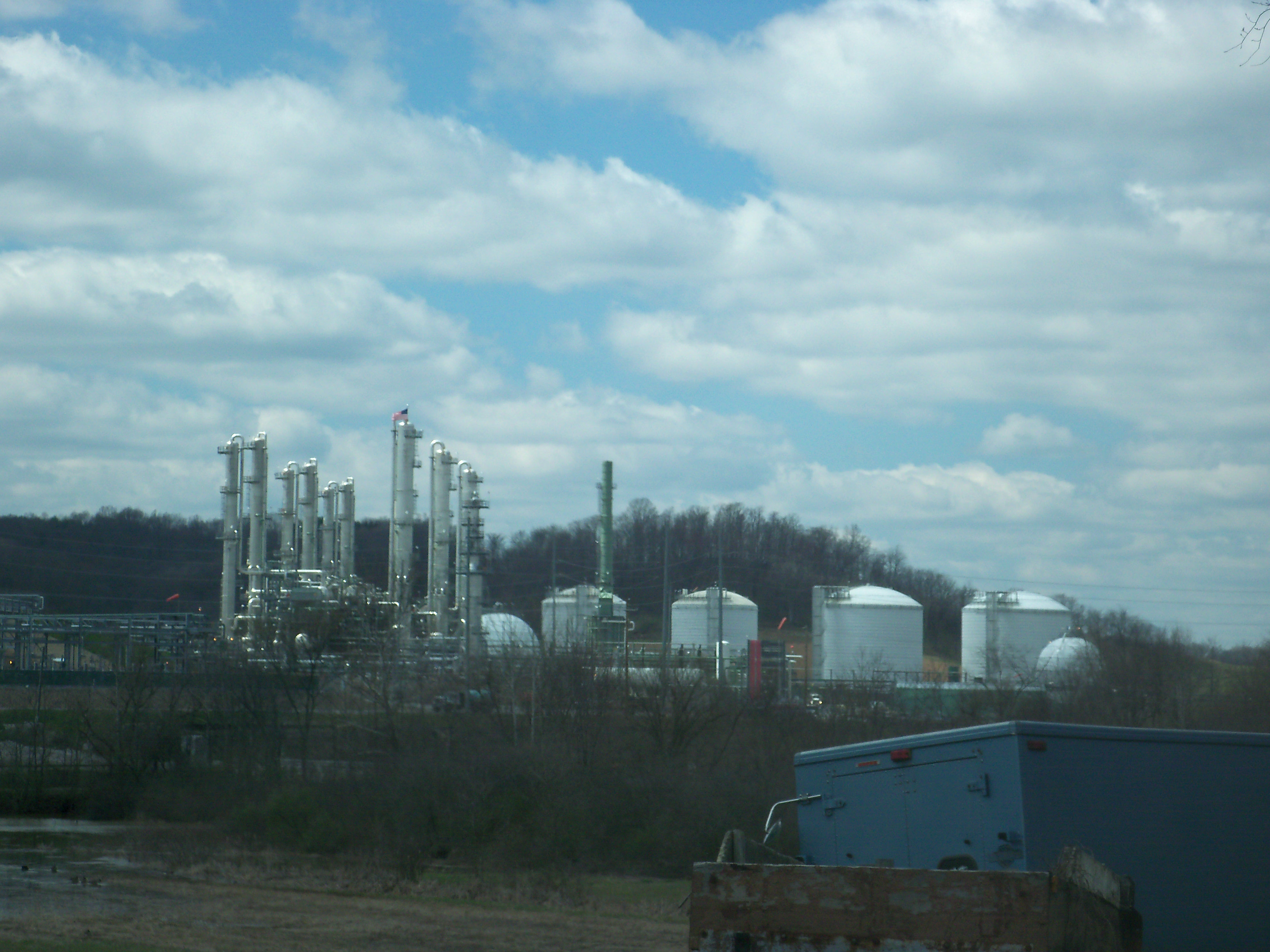
- This large facility west of Scio processes natural gas liquids.

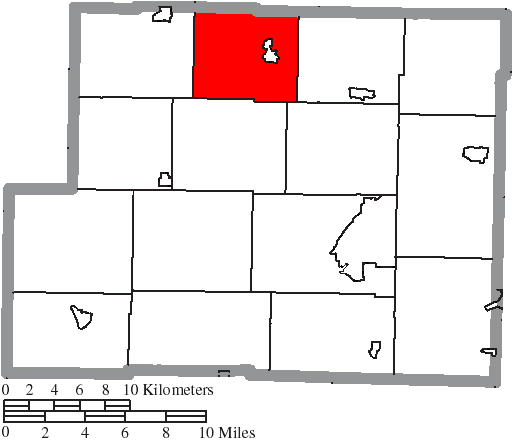
- Location of North Township in Harrison County
- Coordinates: 40°24′21″N 81°6′16″W
- Country: United States
- State: Ohio
- County: Harrison

Area
  - Total: 23.20 sq mi (60.10 km^{2})
  - Land: 23.19 sq mi (60.06 km^{2})
  - Water: 0.015 sq mi (0.04 km^{2})
- Elevation: 1,168 ft (356 m)

Population (2020)
  - Total: 1,562
  - Density: 67.36/sq mi (26.01/km^{2})
- Time zone: UTC-5 (Eastern (EST))
  - Summer (DST): UTC-4 (EDT)
- FIPS code: 39-56084
- GNIS feature ID: 1086280

North Township is one of the fifteen townships of Harrison County, Ohio, United States. As of the 2020 census the population was 1,562.

== Geography ==
Located in the northern part of the county, it borders the following townships:

- Perry Township, Carroll County - north
- Rumley Township - east
- Archer Township - southeast
- Stock Township - south
- Monroe Township - west

The village of Scio is located in central North Township.

== Name and history ==
It is the only North Township statewide.

== Government ==
The township is governed by a three-member board of trustees, who are elected in November of odd-numbered years to a four-year term beginning on the following January 1. Two are elected in the year after the presidential election and one is elected in the year before it. There is also an elected township fiscal officer, who serves a four-year term beginning on April 1 of the year after the election, which is held in November of the year before the presidential election. Vacancies in the fiscal officership or on the board of trustees are filled by the remaining trustees.
