= Rumley Township, Harrison County, Ohio =

Township in Ohio, US

- Township
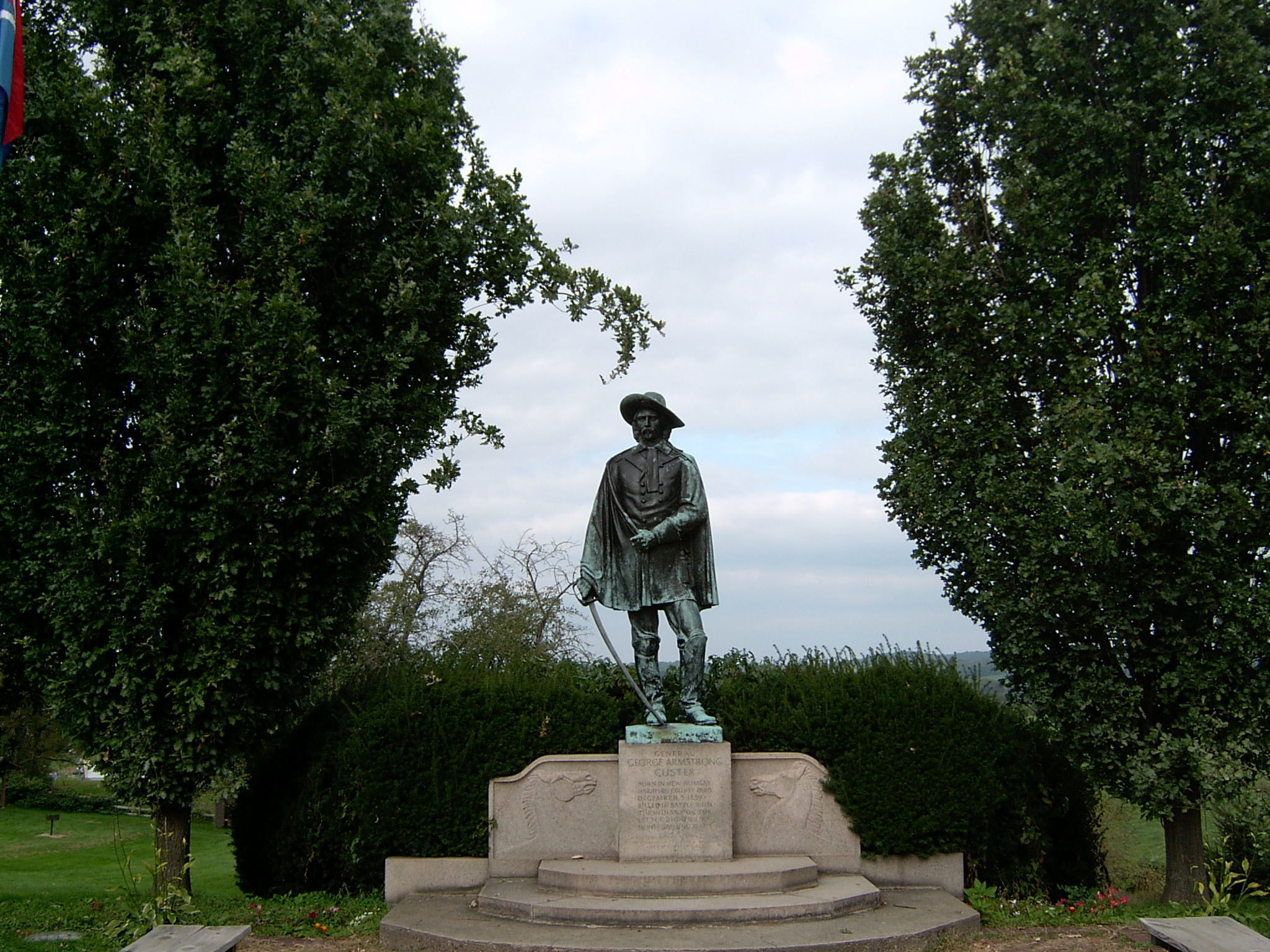
- George Armstrong Custer monument in New Rumley

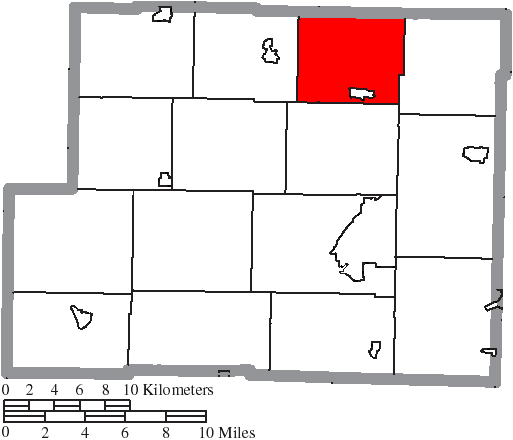
- Location of Rumley Township in Harrison County
- Coordinates: 40°22′46″N 81°0′37″W
- Country: United States
- State: Ohio
- County: Harrison

Area
  - Total: 23.31 sq mi (60.38 km^{2})
  - Land: 23.30 sq mi (60.34 km^{2})
  - Water: 0.019 sq mi (0.05 km^{2})
- Elevation: 1,207 ft (368 m)

Population (2020)
  - Total: 1,275
  - Density: 54.73/sq mi (21.13/km^{2})
- Time zone: UTC-5 (Eastern (EST))
  - Summer (DST): UTC-4 (EDT)
- FIPS code: 39-68994
- GNIS feature ID: 1086282

Rumley Township is one of the fifteen townships of Harrison County, Ohio, United States. As of the 2020 census the population was 1,275.

== Geography ==
Located in the northern part of the county, it borders the following townships:

- Loudon Township, Carroll County - north
- North Township - west
- German Township - east
- Archer Township - south
- Perry Township, Carroll County - northwest

The village of Jewett is located in southern Rumley Township, and the unincorporated community of New Rumley lies in the township's center.

== Name and history ==
It is the only Rumley Township statewide.

== Government ==
The township is governed by a three-member board of trustees, who are elected in November of odd-numbered years to a four-year term beginning on the following January 1. Two are elected in the year after the presidential election and one is elected in the year before it. There is also an elected township fiscal officer, who serves a four-year term beginning on April 1 of the year after the election, which is held in November of the year before the presidential election. Vacancies in the fiscal officership or on the board of trustees are filled by the remaining trustees.
