= New Rumley, Ohio =

Unincorporated community in Ohio, U.S.

Coordinates: 40°24′06″N 81°01′51″W

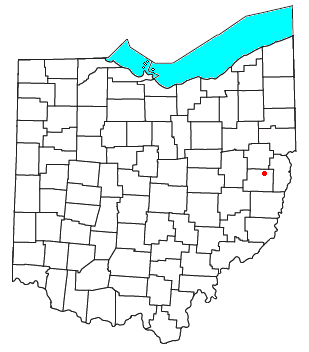
Location of New Rumley, Ohio

New Rumley is an unincorporated community in central Rumley Township, Harrison County, Ohio, United States. It is the birthplace of George Armstrong Custer.

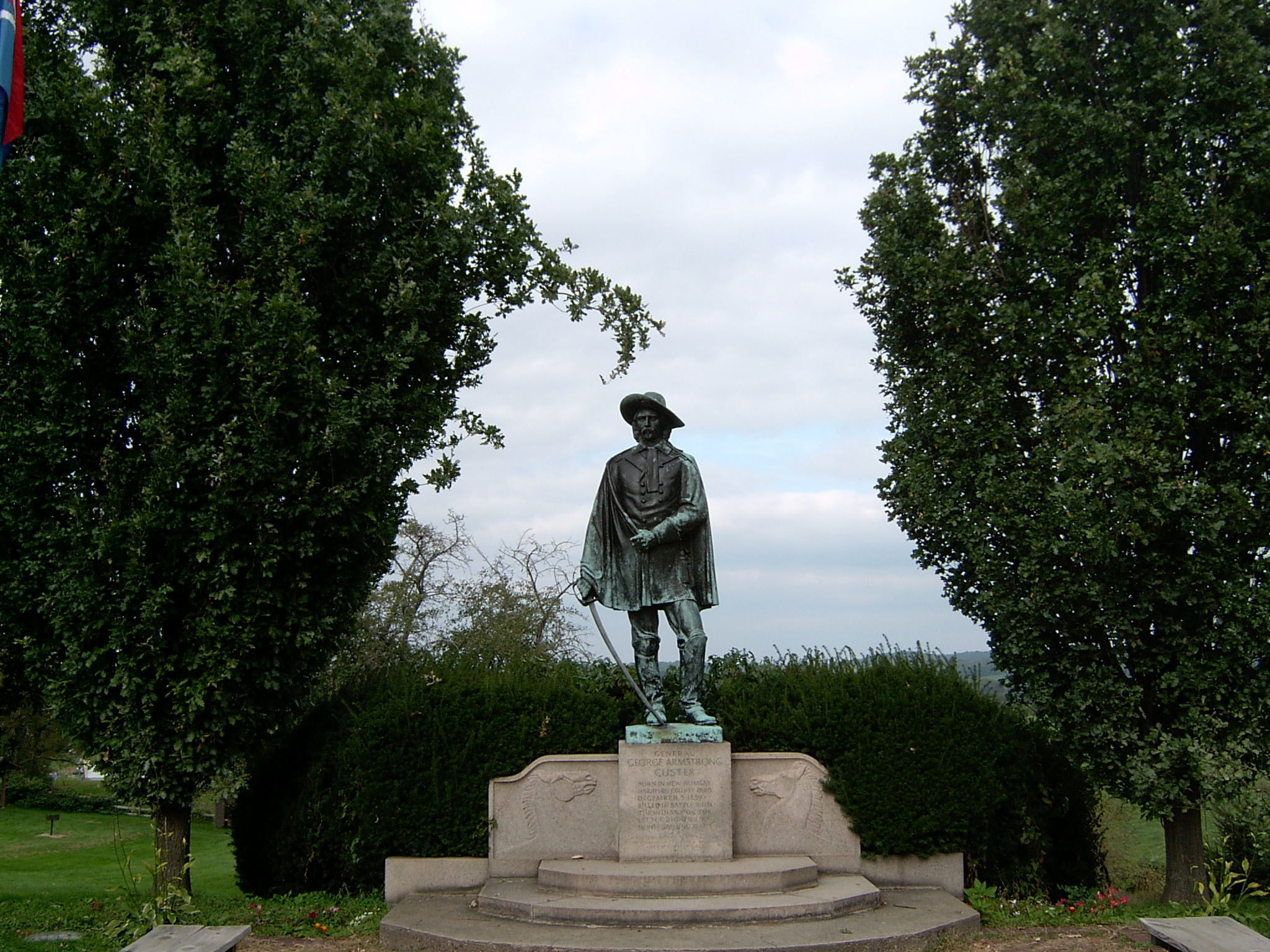
Custer Memorial in New Rumley

The Custer Memorial by Erwin Frey is located along State Route 646 on Rumley's west side. The memorial, consisting of a statue and an exhibit pavilion with information about his life, and a museum operated by the Custer Memorial Association is located at the site of his birthplace, of which only the foundations remain. The memorial is maintained by the Ohio Historical Society.

The community has a post office with the ZIP code 43984. It lies near the villages of Scio and Jewett.

== History ==
New Rumley was platted in 1813. A post office was established at New Rumley in 1820. The post office was discontinued in 2013.
