= Piedmont, Ohio =

Unincorporated community in Ohio, U.S.

Coordinates: 40°11′18″N 81°11′47″W

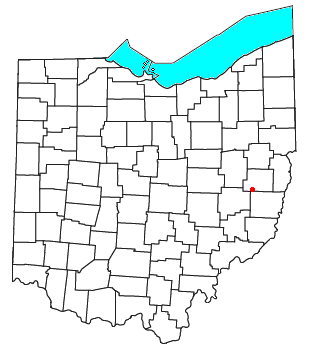
Location of Piedmont, Ohio

Piedmont is an unincorporated community in western Moorefield Township, Harrison County, Ohio, United States. It has a post office with the ZIP code 43983.

Piedmont was originally called Butler, and under the latter name was laid out in 1800.
