= Wayne Township, Jefferson County, Ohio =

Township in Ohio, US

- Township
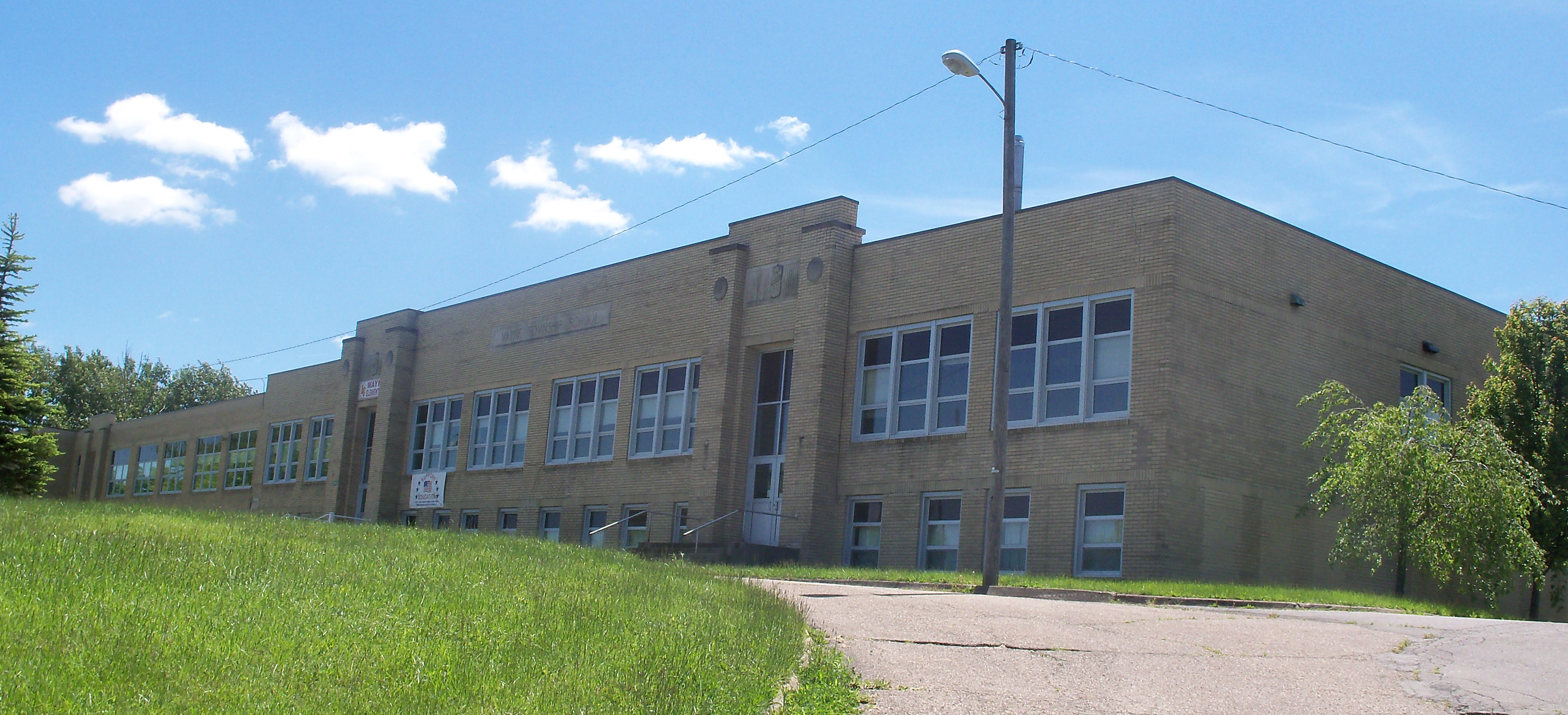
- The former Wayne Elementary School is just west of Bloomingdale

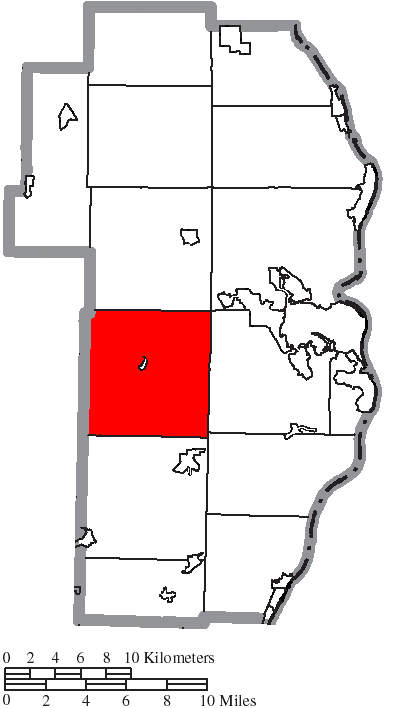
- Location of Wayne Township in Jefferson County
- Coordinates: 40°20′27″N 80°49′7″W
- Country: United States
- State: Ohio
- County: Jefferson

Area
  - Total: 38.7 sq mi (100.3 km^{2})
  - Land: 38.6 sq mi (99.9 km^{2})
  - Water: 0.15 sq mi (0.4 km^{2})
- Elevation: 1,263 ft (385 m)

Population (2020)
  - Total: 2,093
  - Density: 54.3/sq mi (21.0/km^{2})
- Time zone: UTC-5 (Eastern (EST))
  - Summer (DST): UTC-4 (EDT)
- FIPS code: 39-82180
- GNIS feature ID: 1086389

Wayne Township is one of the fourteen townships of Jefferson County, Ohio, United States. The 2020 census found 2,093 people in the township.

== Geography ==
Located in the western part of the county, it borders the following townships:

- Salem Township - north
- Island Creek Township - northeast corner
- Cross Creek Township - east
- Wells Township - southeast
- Smithfield Township - south
- Green Township, Harrison County - southwest
- German Township, Harrison County - northwest

The village of Bloomingdale is located in central Wayne Township.

== Name and history ==
Wayne Township was founded in 1805.

It is one of twenty Wayne Townships statewide.

== Government ==
The township is governed by a three-member board of trustees, who are elected in November of odd-numbered years to a four-year term beginning on the following January 1. Two are elected in the year after the presidential election and one is elected in the year before it. There is also an elected township fiscal officer, who serves a four-year term beginning on April 1 of the year after the election, which is held in November of the year before the presidential election. Vacancies in the fiscal officership or on the board of trustees are filled by the remaining trustees.
