= Hopedale, Ohio =

- Village
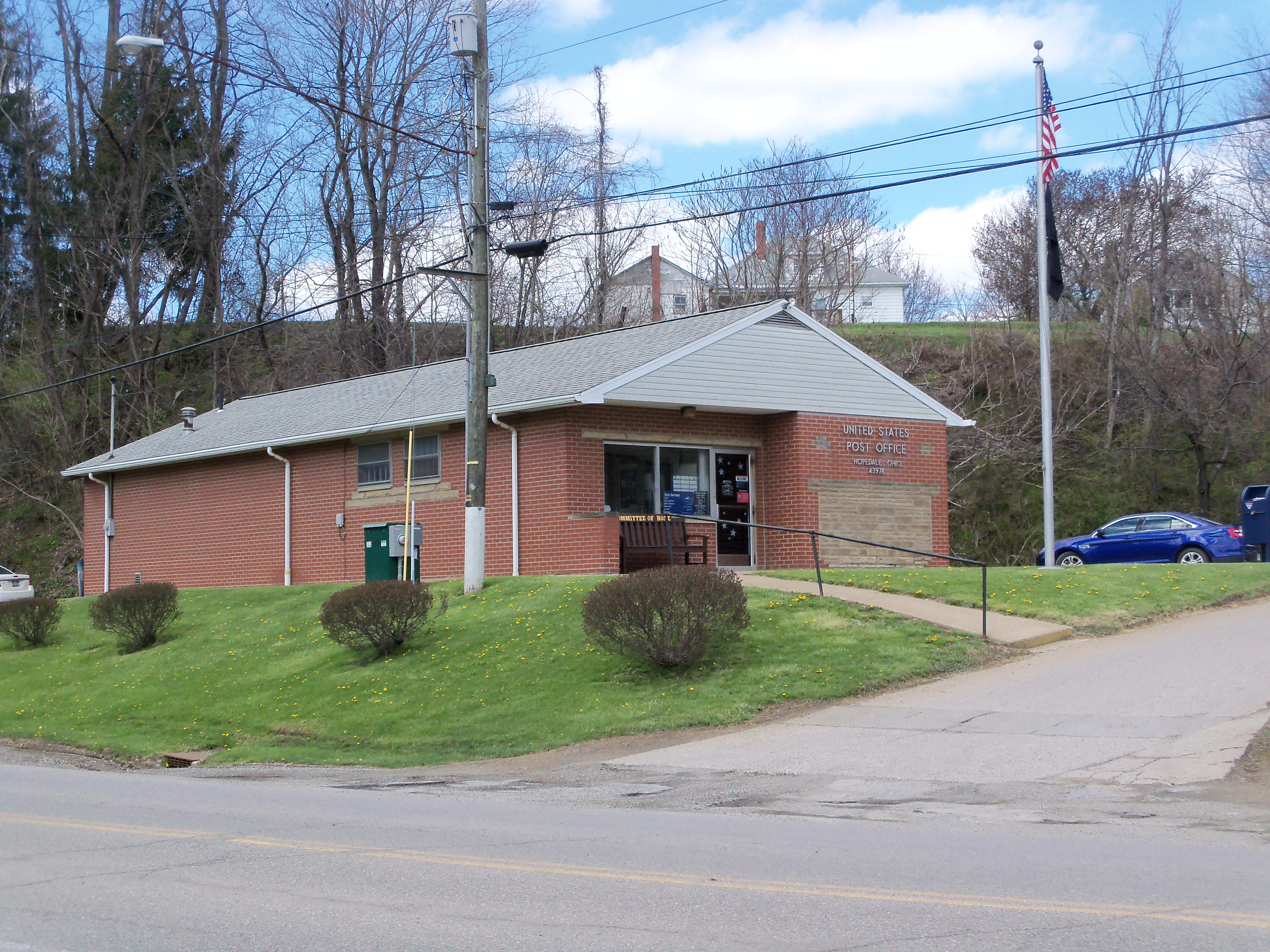
- Hopedale Post Office

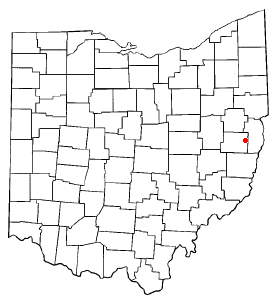
- Location of Hopedale, Ohio

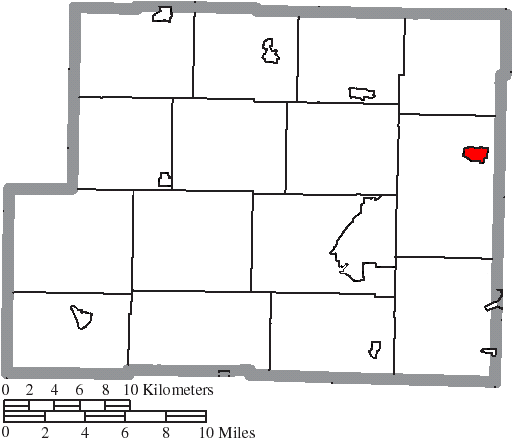
- Location of Hopedale in Harrison County
- Coordinates: 40°19′35″N 80°53′44″W
- Country: United States
- State: Ohio
- County: Harrison
- Township: Green
- Incorporated: April 1, 1860

Government
  - Mayor: Michael Pelegreen, Sr.

Area
  - Total: 1.17 sq mi (3.04 km^{2})
  - Land: 1.17 sq mi (3.04 km^{2})
  - Water: 0 sq mi (0.00 km^{2})
- Elevation: 1,240 ft (380 m)

Population (2020)
  - Total: 920
  - Density: 780/sq mi (303/km^{2})
- Time zone: UTC-5 (Eastern (EST))
  - Summer (DST): UTC-4 (EDT)
- ZIP code: 43976
- Area code: 740
- FIPS code: 39-36260
- GNIS feature ID: 2398540
- Website: www.hopedaleohio.com

Hopedale is a village in Green Township, Harrison County, Ohio, United States. The population was 920 at the 2020 census.

== History ==
Hopedale was platted in 1849. A post office has been in operation at Hopedale since 1850.

== Geography ==
According to the United States Census Bureau, the village has a total area of 1.12 square miles (2.90 km^{2}), all land.

== Demographics ==
Historical population
Census	Pop.	Note	%±
1870	359		—
1880	414		15.3%
1890	424		2.4%
1900	365		−13.9%
1910	391		7.1%
1920	561		43.5%
1930	742		32.3%
1940	901		21.4%
1950	888		−1.4%
1960	932		5.0%
1970	916		−1.7%
1980	857		−6.4%
1990	685		−20.1%
2000	984		43.6%
2010	950		−3.5%
2020	920		−3.2%
U.S. Decennial Census

=== 2010 census ===
As of the census of 2010, there were 950 people, 369 households, and 249 families living in the village. The population density was 848.2 inhabitants per square mile (327.5/km^{2}). There were 401 housing units at an average density of 358.0 per square mile (138.2/km^{2}). The racial makeup of the village was 97.1% White, 0.8% African American, 0.3% Native American, 0.3% Asian, and 1.5% from two or more races. Hispanic or Latino of any race were 0.5% of the population.

There were 369 households, of which 29.0% had children under the age of 18 living with them, 53.1% were married couples living together, 8.4% had a female householder with no husband present, 6.0% had a male householder with no wife present, and 32.5% were non-families. 29.5% of all households were made up of individuals, and 16% had someone living alone who was 65 years of age or older. The average household size was 2.35 and the average family size was 2.88.

The median age in the village was 48 years. 21.6% of residents were under the age of 18; 4.8% were between the ages of 18 and 24; 20.1% were from 25 to 44; 28.3% were from 45 to 64; and 25.3% were 65 years of age or older. The gender makeup of the village was 48.9% male and 51.1% female.

=== 2000 census ===
As of the census of 2000, there were 984 people, 383 households, and 278 families living in the village. The population density was 1,374.8 inhabitants per square mile (530.8/km^{2}). There were 400 housing units at an average density of 558.8 per square mile (215.8/km^{2}). The racial makeup of the village was 98.98% White, 0.61% African American, 0.10% Native American, and 0.30% from two or more races. Hispanic or Latino of any race were 0.51% of the population.

There were 383 households, out of which 28.2% had children under the age of 18 living with them, 62.1% were married couples living together, 8.6% had a female householder with no husband present, and 27.4% were non-families. 23.2% of all households were made up of individuals, and 14.6% had someone living alone who was 65 years of age or older. The average household size was 2.42 and the average family size was 2.83.

In the village, the population was spread out, with 21.3% under the age of 18, 4.7% from 18 to 24, 27.3% from 25 to 44, 22.4% from 45 to 64, and 24.3% who were 65 years of age or older. The median age was 43 years. For every 100 females there were 94.5 males. For every 100 females age 18 and over, there were 84.3 males.

The median income for a household in the village was $34,135, and the median income for a family was $38,558. Males had a median income of $35,263 versus $21,964 for females. The per capita income for the village was $16,536. About 9.8% of families and 11.8% of the population were below the poverty line, including 14.7% of those under age 18 and 8.5% of those age 65 or over.
