= Short Creek Township, Harrison County, Ohio =

Township in Ohio, US

- Township
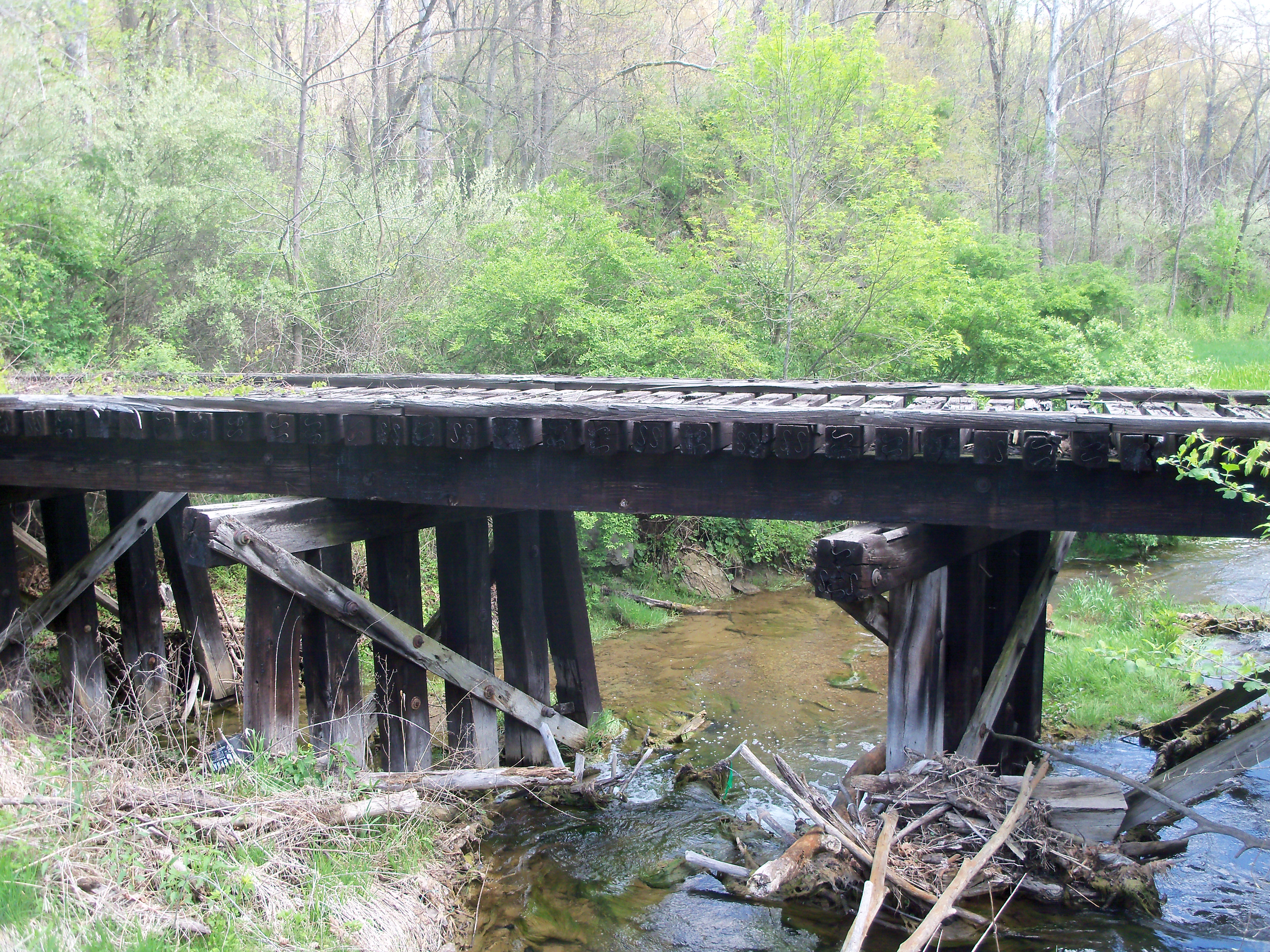
- This old bridge across South Branch Short Creek next to U.S. Route 250 led to the Georgetown Mine.

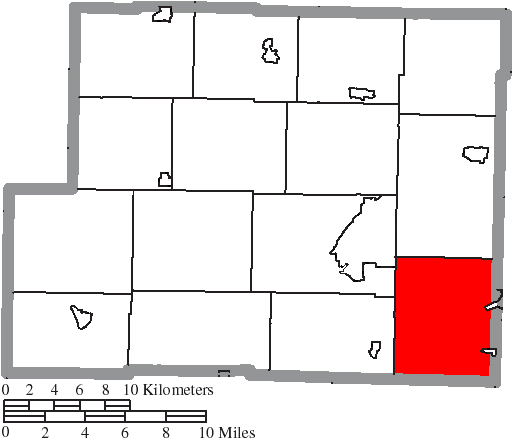
- Location of Short Creek Township in Harrison County
- Coordinates: 40°12′33″N 80°54′38″W
- Country: United States
- State: Ohio
- County: Harrison

Area
  - Total: 30.6 sq mi (79.3 km^{2})
  - Land: 30.1 sq mi (78.0 km^{2})
  - Water: 0.50 sq mi (1.3 km^{2})
- Elevation: 945 ft (288 m)

Population (2020)
  - Total: 1,031
  - Density: 34.2/sq mi (13.2/km^{2})
- Time zone: UTC-5 (Eastern (EST))
  - Summer (DST): UTC-4 (EDT)
- ZIP code: 43907
- Area code: 740
- FIPS code: 39-72361
- GNIS feature ID: 1086283

Short Creek Township is one of the fifteen townships of Harrison County, Ohio, United States. As of the 2020 census the population was 1,031.

== Geography ==
Located in the southeastern corner of the county, it borders the following townships:

- Green Township - north
- Smithfield Township, Jefferson County - northeast
- Mount Pleasant Township, Jefferson County - east
- Colerain Township, Belmont County - southeast corner
- Wheeling Township, Belmont County - south
- Athens Township - southwest
- Cadiz Township - northwest

Two incorporated villages are located in Short Creek Township: Adena in the northeast, and Harrisville in the southeast.

== Name and history ==
The township is named for Short Creek, a local tributary of the Ohio River. It is the only Short Creek Township statewide.

== Government ==
The township is governed by a three-member board of trustees, who are elected in November of odd-numbered years to a four-year term beginning on the following January 1. Two are elected in the year after the presidential election and one is elected in the year before it. There is also an elected township fiscal officer, who serves a four-year term beginning on April 1 of the year after the election, which is held in November of the year before the presidential election. Vacancies in the fiscal officership or on the board of trustees are filled by the remaining trustees.
