= Tappan Lake =

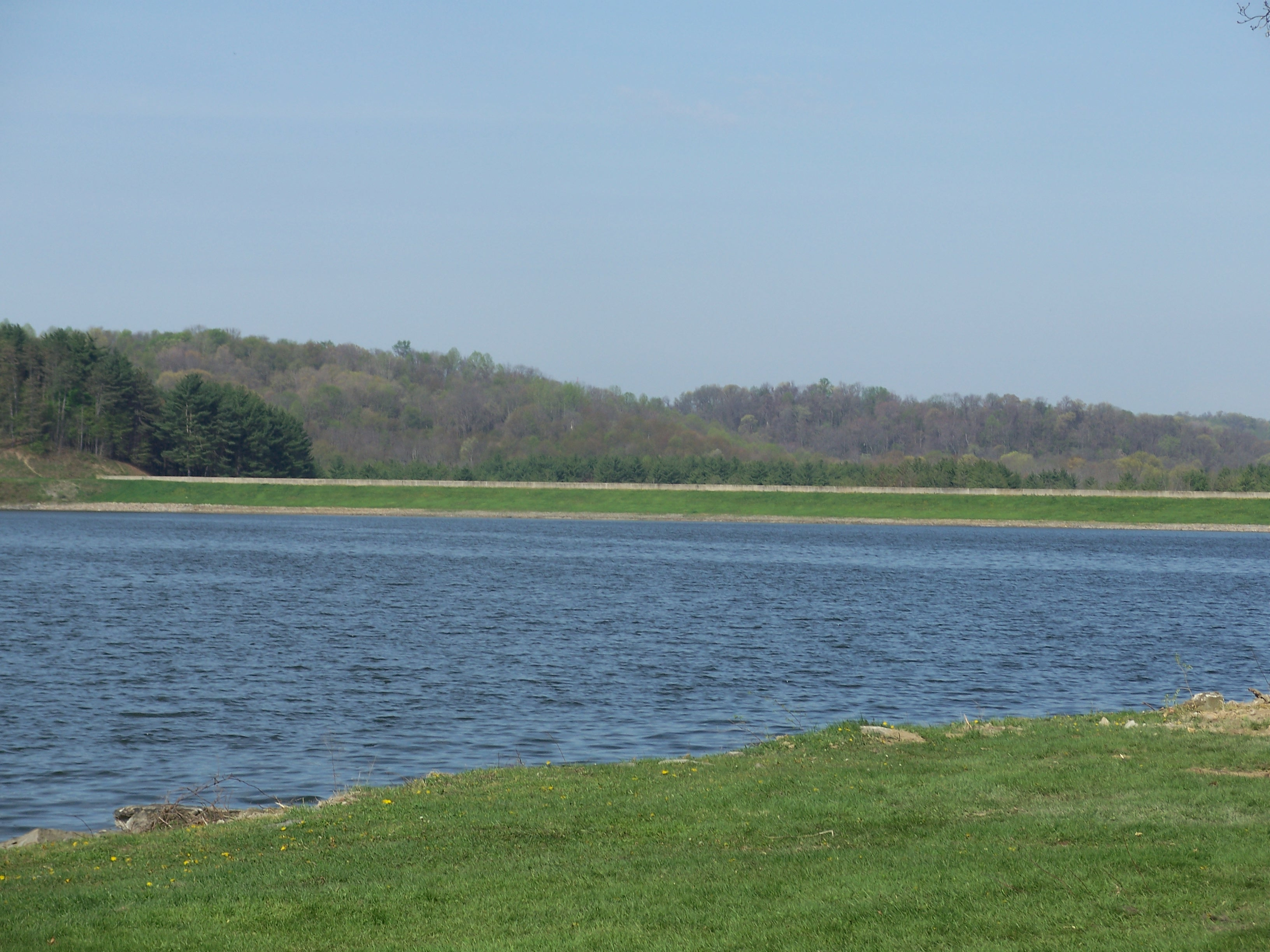

- Location within Ohio Location within the United States
- Location: Harrison County, Ohio, United States
- Coordinates: 40°21′30″N 81°13′34″W
- Type: reservoir
- Basin countries: United States
- Surface area: 2,350 acres (9.5 km^{2})
- Surface elevation: 892 ft (272 m)

Tappan Lake, also known as Tappan Reservoir, is a reservoir in Harrison County, Ohio, United States.

The lake covers 2,350 acres (9.5 km^{2}) of water and 5,000 acres (20 km^{2}) of surrounding land, as part of the Muskingum Watershed Conservancy District. Normal pool elevation is 899.3 ft (274.1 m) above sea level. The lake has a 399 horsepower (298 kW) limit for boats. There are two public launch ramps - one near the roadside rest area on U.S. 250, and the other across from Tappan Marina. A third launch ramp is located inside Tappan Lake Park.

It is located between Cadiz and Dennison. U.S. Route 250 follows Tappan Lake for several miles on a series of causeways built during the construction of the lake in the 1930s.

Tappan Lake took its name from the former community of Tappan, which was inundated with the completion of the lake in 1938. The former town of Laceyville also lies beneath the lake.
