= Moorefield Township, Harrison County, Ohio =

Township in Ohio, US

- Township
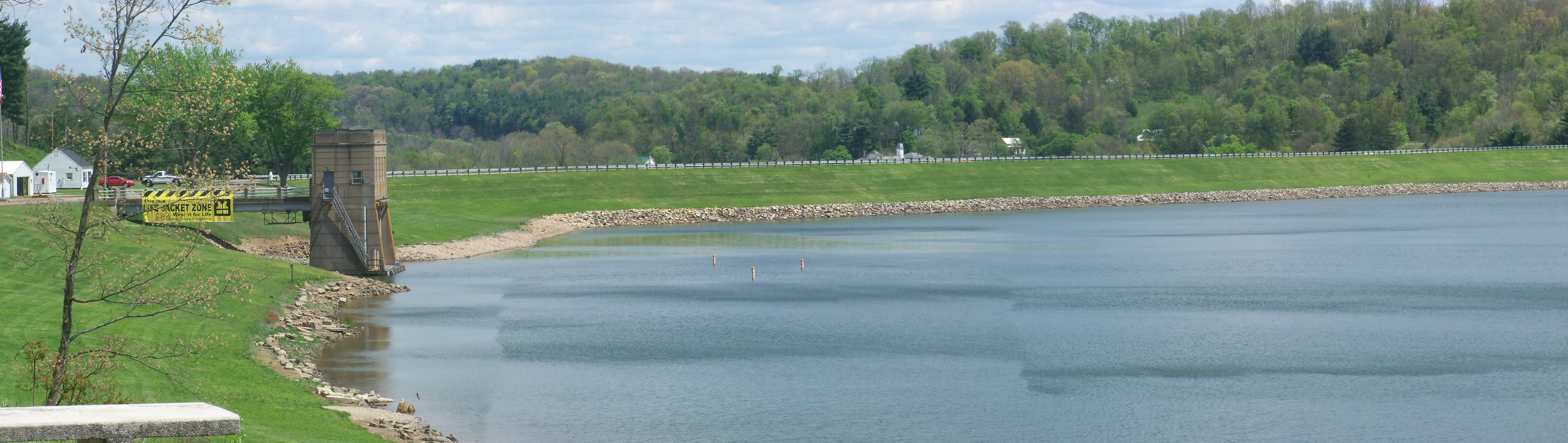
- Piedmont Lake dam is alongside U.S. Route 22.

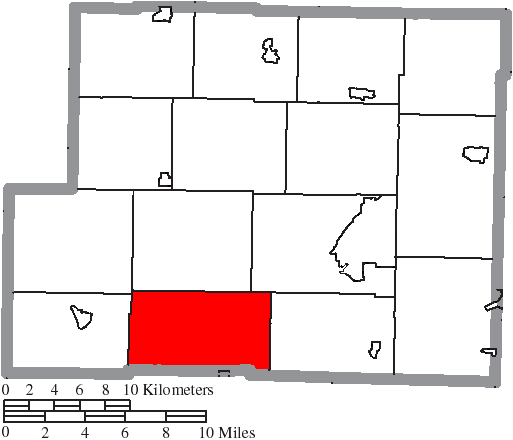
- Location of Moorefield Township in Harrison County
- Coordinates: 40°11′45″N 81°9′40″W
- Country: United States
- State: Ohio
- County: Harrison

Area
  - Total: 27.5 sq mi (71.3 km^{2})
  - Land: 26.9 sq mi (69.6 km^{2})
  - Water: 0.66 sq mi (1.7 km^{2})
- Elevation: 1,099 ft (335 m)

Population (2020)
  - Total: 377
  - Density: 14.0/sq mi (5.42/km^{2})
- Time zone: UTC-5 (Eastern (EST))
  - Summer (DST): UTC-4 (EDT)
- ZIP code: 43907
- Area code: 740
- FIPS code: 39-51940
- GNIS feature ID: 1086279

Moorefield Township is one of the fifteen townships of Harrison County, Ohio, United States. As of the 2020 census the population was 377.

== Geography ==
Located in the southern part of the county, it borders the following townships:

- Nottingham Township - north
- Cadiz Township - northeast
- Athens Township - east
- Flushing Township, Belmont County - south
- Freeport Township - west
- Washington Township - northwest

No municipalities are located in Moorefield Township, although the unincorporated community of Piedmont lies in the western part of the township.

== Name and history ==
Statewide, the only other Moorefield Township is located in Clark County.

== Government ==
The township is governed by a three-member board of trustees, who are elected in November of odd-numbered years to a four-year term beginning on the following January 1. Two are elected in the year after the presidential election and one is elected in the year before it. There is also an elected township fiscal officer, who serves a four-year term beginning on April 1 of the year after the election, which is held in November of the year before the presidential election. Vacancies in the fiscal officership or on the board of trustees are filled by the remaining trustees.
