= Harrison County, Ohio =

County in Ohio, United States

- County
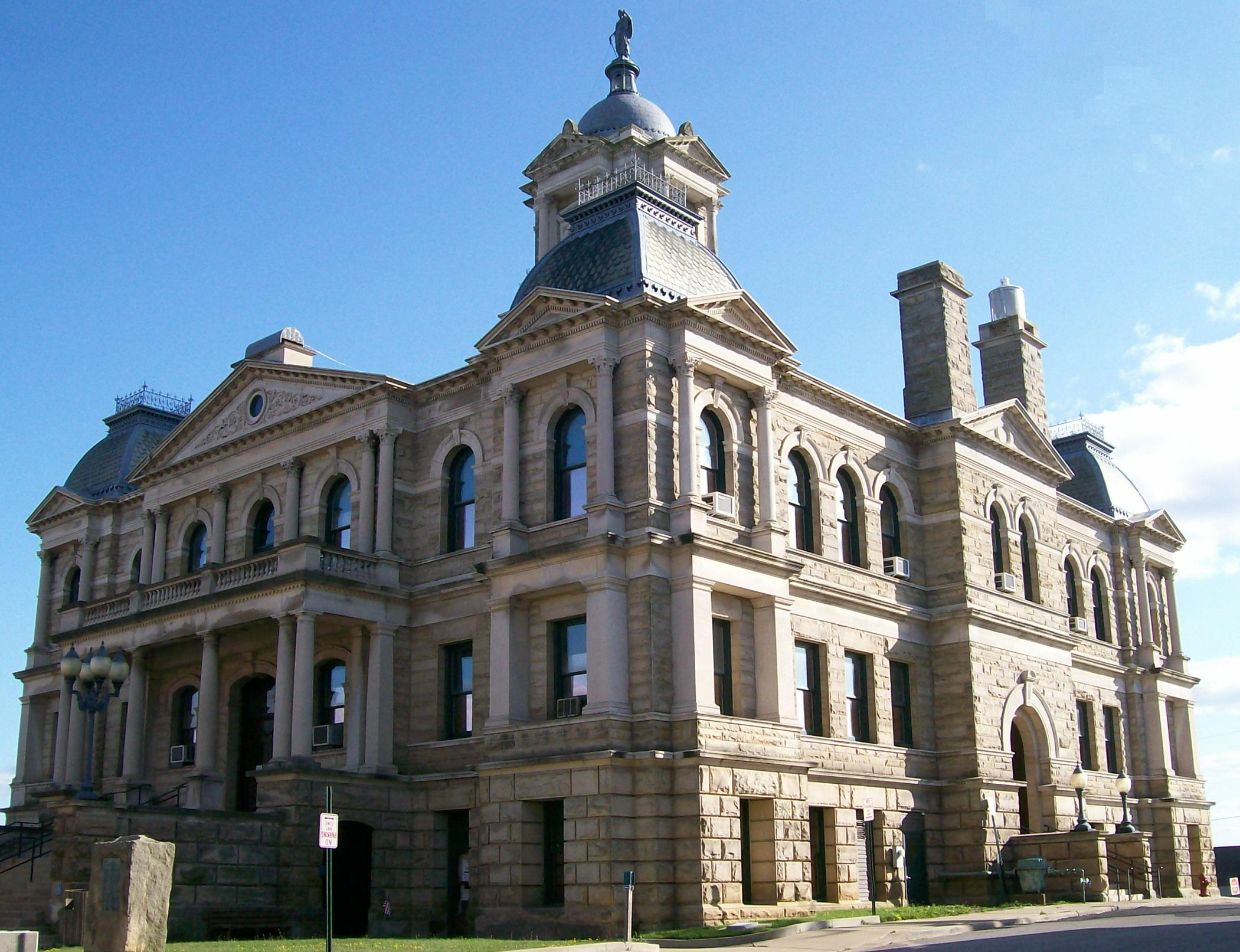
- Harrison County Courthouse

- Flag Seal

- Location within the U.S. state of Ohio
- Coordinates: 40°17′N 81°05′W
- Country: United States
- State: Ohio
- Founded: February 1, 1813
- Named for: William Henry Harrison
- Seat: Cadiz
- Largest village: Cadiz

Area
  - Total: 411 sq mi (1,060 km^{2})
  - Land: 402 sq mi (1,040 km^{2})
  - Water: 8.4 sq mi (22 km^{2}) 2.1%

Population (2020)
  - Total: 14,483
  - Estimate (2025): 14,070 ▼
  - Density: 35/sq mi (14/km^{2})
- Time zone: UTC−5 (Eastern)
  - Summer (DST): UTC−4 (EDT)
- Congressional district: 6th
- Website: www.harrisoncountyohio.gov

Harrison County is a county located in the U.S. state of Ohio. As of the 2020 census, the population was 14,483, making it the fifth-least populous county in Ohio. Its county seat and largest village is Cadiz. The county is named for General William Henry Harrison, who was later president of the United States.

== History ==
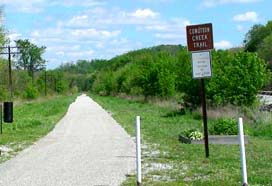
The Conotton Creek Trail begins in Bowerston.

Harrison County was formed from parts of Jefferson and Tuscarawas Counties in 1813. The county was named after General William Henry Harrison, the hero of the battle of Tippecanoe in the War of 1812 (and later the ninth U.S. president).

Oil was discovered near Jewett, Ohio in 1895, and then in the Scio, Ohio area in 1898. However, by 1901, the Scio oil boom had essentially ceased.

== Geography ==
According to the U.S. Census Bureau, the county has a total area of 411 square miles (1,060 km^{2}), of which 402 square miles (1,040 km^{2}) is land and 8.4 square miles (22 km^{2}) (2.1%) is water.

On May 16, 2013, the Chicago Tribune reported that the Utica shale underlying Harrison County showed promise as a tight oil production zone. To produce tight oil in large quantities would require horizontal drilling and fracturing of the shale formation, as was being done in North Dakota and Texas.

=== Adjacent counties ===
- Carroll County (north)
- Jefferson County (east)
- Belmont County (south)
- Guernsey County (southwest)
- Tuscarawas County (west)

=== Conotton Creek Trail ===
The Conotton Creek Trail is a rails-to-trails path that runs along Conotton Creek from Bowerston to Jewett in northern Harrison County, Ohio. The paved multi-use trail is 11.4 miles (18.3 km) long.

== Demographics ==
Historical population
Census	Pop.	Note	%±
1820	14,345		—
1830	20,916		45.8%
1840	20,099		−3.9%
1850	20,157		0.3%
1860	19,110		−5.2%
1870	18,682		−2.2%
1880	20,456		9.5%
1890	20,830		1.8%
1900	20,486		−1.7%
1910	19,076		−6.9%
1920	19,625		2.9%
1930	18,844		−4.0%
1940	20,313		7.8%
1950	19,054		−6.2%
1960	17,995		−5.6%
1970	17,013		−5.5%
1980	18,152		6.7%
1990	16,085		−11.4%
2000	15,856		−1.4%
2010	15,864		0.1%
2020	14,483		−8.7%
2025 (est.)	14,070	▼	−2.9%
U.S. Decennial Census; 1790-1960 1900-1990; 1990-2000 2020

=== 2020 census ===
As of the 2020 census, the county had a population of 14,483. The median age was 46.6 years, with 21.1% of residents under the age of 18 and 23.0% of residents 65 years of age or older. There were 98.7 males for every 100 females, and 97.4 males for every 100 females age 18 and over.

The racial makeup of the county was 92.9% White, 1.7% Black or African American, 0.1% American Indian and Alaska Native, 0.3% Asian, <0.1% Native Hawaiian and Pacific Islander, 0.3% from some other race, and 4.7% from two or more races. Hispanic or Latino residents of any race comprised 0.9% of the population.

<0.1% of residents lived in urban areas, while 100.0% lived in rural areas.

There were 6,032 households in the county, of which 26.3% had children under the age of 18 living in them. Of all households, 49.9% were married-couple households, 19.9% were households with a male householder and no spouse or partner present, and 23.4% were households with a female householder and no spouse or partner present. About 29.4% of all households were made up of individuals and 15.2% had someone living alone who was 65 years of age or older. There were 7,379 housing units, of which 18.3% were vacant. Among occupied housing units, 76.3% were owner-occupied and 23.7% were renter-occupied. The homeowner vacancy rate was 2.4% and the rental vacancy rate was 12.4%.

=== Racial and ethnic composition ===
Harrison County, Ohio - racial and ethnic composition Note: the US Census treats Hispanic/Latino as an ethnic category. This table excludes Latinos from the racial categories and assigns them to a separate category. Hispanics/Latinos may be of any race.
Race / ethnicity (NH = Non-Hispanic)	Pop 1980	Pop 1990	Pop 2000	Pop 2010	Pop 2020	% 1980	% 1990	% 2000	% 2010	% 2020
White alone (NH)	17,588	15,610	15,264	15,169	13,425	96.89%	97.05%	96.27%	95.62%	92.69%
Black or African American alone (NH)	467	388	346	324	234	2.57%	2.41%	2.18%	2.04%	1.62%
Native American or Alaska Native alone (NH)	14	22	12	13	14	0.08%	0.14%	0.08%	0.08%	0.10%
Asian alone (NH)	22	15	16	22	40	0.12%	0.09%	0.10%	0.14%	0.28%
Native Hawaiian or Pacific Islander alone (NH)	x	x	1	1	6	x	x	0.01%	0.01%	0.04%
Other race alone (NH)	7	7	4	12	18	0.04%	0.04%	0.03%	0.08%	0.12%
Mixed-race or multiracial (NH)	x	x	154	244	616	x	x	0.97%	1.54%	4.25%
Hispanic or Latino (any race)	54	43	59	79	130	0.30%	0.27%	0.37%	0.50%	0.90%
Total	18,152	16,085	15,856	15,864	14,483	100.00%	100.00%	100.00%	100.00%	100.00%

=== 2010 census ===
As of the 2010 census, there were 15,864 people, 6,526 households, and 4,452 families living in the county. The population density was 39.4 inhabitants per square mile (15.2/km^{2}). There were 8,170 housing units at an average density of 20.3 units per square mile (7.8 units/km^{2}). The racial makeup of the county was 95.9% white, 2.1% black or African American, 0.1% Asian, 0.1% American Indian, 0.1% from other races, and 1.6% from two or more races. Those of Hispanic or Latino origin made up 0.5% of the population. In terms of ancestry, 20.9% were German, 15.5% were Irish, 9.0% were English, 8.9% were American, and 5.7% were Polish.

Of the 6,526 households, 28.1% had children under the age of 18 living with them, 53.4% were married couples living together, 9.5% had a female householder with no husband present, 31.8% were non-families, and 27.1% of all households were made up of individuals. The average household size was 2.40 and the average family size was 2.88. The median age was 44.4 years.

The median income for a household in the county was $35,363 and the median income for a family was $44,325. Males had a median income of $38,489 versus $24,063 for females. The per capita income for the county was $19,318. About 14.1% of families and 18.4% of the population were below the poverty line, including 26.3% of those under age 18 and 12.6% of those age 65 or over.

=== 2000 census ===
As of the 2000 census, there were 15,856 people, 6,398 households, and 4,516 families living in the county. The population density was 39 people per square mile (15 people/km^{2}). There were 7,680 housing units at an average density of 19 units per square mile (7.3/km^{2}). The racial makeup of the county was 96.49% White, 2.19% Black or African American, 0.08% Native American, 0.11% Asian, 0.01% Pacific Islander, 0.09% from other races, and 1.03% from two or more races. 0.37% of the population were Hispanic or Latino of any race.

There were 6,398 households, out of which 29.1% had children under the age of 18 living with them, 58.5% were married couples living together, 8.8% had a female householder with no husband present, and 29.4% were non-families. 25.6% of all households were made up of individuals, and 13% had someone living alone who was 65 years of age or older. The average household size was 2.44 and the average family size was 2.92.

In the county, the population was spread out, with 23% under the age of 18, 6.9% from 18 to 24, 26.6% from 25 to 44, 25.8% from 45 to 64, and 17.7% who were 65 years of age or older. The median age was 41 years. For every 100 females there were 94.1 males. For every 100 females age 18 and over, there were 89.9 males.

The median income for a household in the county was $30,318, and the median income for a family was $36,646. Males had a median income of $30,485 versus $18,813 for females. The per capita income for the county was $16,479. 13.3% of the population and 11% of families were below the poverty line. 17.5% of those under the age of 18 and 8.4% of those 65 and older were living below the poverty line.

== Politics ==
Harrison County was considered a swing county in presidential elections prior to 2016. The last Democrat to win the county was Bill Clinton in 1996, although Al Gore came within 66 votes in 2000 and Barack Obama came within 189 votes in 2008.

United States presidential election results for Harrison County, Ohio
Year	Republican		Democratic		Third party(ies)	
Year	No.	%	No.	%	No.	%
1856	2,060	56.55%	1,473	40.43%	110	3.02%
1860	2,175	60.00%	759	20.94%	691	19.06%
1864	2,236	58.81%	1,566	41.19%	0	0.00%
1868	2,267	58.32%	1,620	41.68%	0	0.00%
1872	2,303	57.36%	1,695	42.22%	17	0.42%
1876	2,564	55.55%	2,020	43.76%	32	0.69%
1880	2,767	56.53%	2,082	42.53%	46	0.94%
1884	2,765	55.39%	2,077	41.61%	150	3.00%
1888	2,763	54.93%	1,927	38.31%	340	6.76%
1892	2,541	51.60%	2,032	41.27%	351	7.13%
1896	3,151	57.36%	2,245	40.87%	97	1.77%
1900	3,274	57.94%	2,261	40.01%	116	2.05%
1904	3,115	63.40%	1,578	32.12%	220	4.48%
1908	3,069	59.36%	1,961	37.93%	140	2.71%
1912	1,950	42.43%	1,714	37.29%	932	20.28%
1916	2,517	55.76%	1,911	42.33%	86	1.91%
1920	5,053	66.63%	2,473	32.61%	58	0.76%
1924	4,904	65.97%	1,999	26.89%	531	7.14%
1928	6,095	79.40%	1,516	19.75%	65	0.85%
1932	4,759	56.39%	3,512	41.62%	168	1.99%
1936	4,779	47.58%	5,231	52.08%	35	0.35%
1940	5,729	55.69%	4,559	44.31%	0	0.00%
1944	5,194	60.57%	3,381	39.43%	0	0.00%
1948	4,215	54.74%	3,422	44.44%	63	0.82%
1952	5,306	59.48%	3,614	40.52%	0	0.00%
1956	5,444	65.79%	2,831	34.21%	0	0.00%
1960	5,191	58.77%	3,641	41.23%	0	0.00%
1964	2,928	36.21%	5,159	63.79%	0	0.00%
1968	3,532	45.87%	3,594	46.68%	574	7.45%
1972	4,554	64.96%	2,388	34.07%	68	0.97%
1976	3,509	45.68%	4,070	52.99%	102	1.33%
1980	3,639	52.62%	2,848	41.18%	429	6.20%
1984	4,276	55.45%	3,370	43.70%	66	0.86%
1988	3,298	45.48%	3,881	53.52%	73	1.01%
1992	2,289	29.24%	3,830	48.93%	1,708	21.82%
1996	2,310	31.21%	3,721	50.27%	1,371	18.52%
2000	3,417	47.72%	3,351	46.80%	393	5.49%
2004	4,274	52.71%	3,780	46.61%	55	0.68%
2008	3,872	49.53%	3,683	47.12%	262	3.35%
2012	4,019	56.19%	2,950	41.24%	184	2.57%
2016	5,098	71.75%	1,688	23.76%	319	4.49%
2020	5,792	75.58%	1,768	23.07%	103	1.34%
2024	5,484	77.02%	1,559	21.90%	77	1.08%

United States Senate election results for Harrison County, Ohio1
Year	Republican		Democratic		Third party(ies)	
Year	No.	%	No.	%	No.	%
2024	4,891	69.20%	1,857	26.27%	320	4.53%

== Transportation ==
The Harrison County Airport is located two nautical miles (2.3 mi; 3.7 km) south of Cadiz's central business district.

== Communities ==
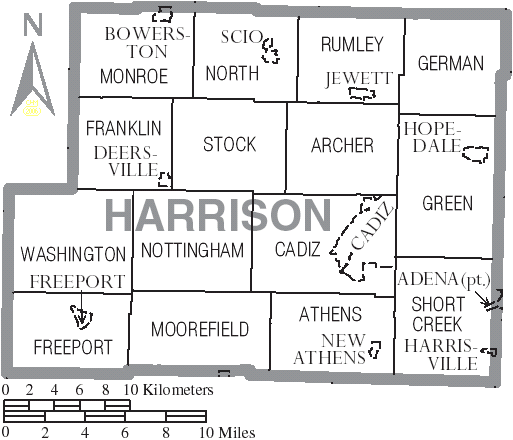
Map of Harrison County, with municipal and township labels

=== Villages ===
- Adena
- Bowerston
- Cadiz (county seat)
- Deersville
- Freeport
- Harrisville
- Hopedale
- Jewett
- New Athens
- Scio

=== Townships ===
- Archer
- Athens
- Cadiz
- Franklin
- Freeport
- German
- Green
- Monroe
- Moorefield
- North
- Nottingham
- Rumley
- Short Creek
- Stock
- Washington

=== Census-designated place ===
- Tippecanoe

=== Unincorporated communities ===
- Brownsville
- Conotton
- East Cadiz
- Georgetown
- Germano
- Laceyville
- Moorefield
- New Rumley
- Piedmont
- Smyrna
- Tappan

== Notable residents ==
- John Bingham - representative to Congress and author of significant portions of the Fourteenth Amendment to the Constitution
- Benjamin Cowen - assistant secretary of the interior, principal political facilitator in establishing Yellowstone National Park and the idea that the use of national parks is for all Americans
- George Custer - served in the American Civil War and was killed in the Battle of Little Big Horn
- Thomas Custer - Medal of Honor recipient, and brother of George Custer
- Clark Gable - actor
- William Henry Holmes - anthropologist, archaeologist, geologist, and museum director
- Edwin Stanton - secretary of war in the Abraham Lincoln administration

== See also ==
- National Register of Historic Places listings in Harrison County, Ohio
- Petroleum industry in Ohio
