= Cream City, Ohio =

- Unincorporated community
- Location within Ohio
- Coordinates: 40°33′52″N 80°43′04″W
- Country: United States
- State: Ohio
- Counties: Jefferson
- Elevation: 699 ft (213 m)
- Time zone: UTC-5 (Eastern (EST))
  - Summer (DST): UTC-4 (EDT)
- ZIP code: 43932
- Area code: 740
- GNIS feature ID: 1048640

Cream City is an unincorporated community located in Saline Township, Jefferson County, Ohio, United States. It is located between Irondale and Hammondsville, along County Road 50, which is also Creek Street within the village.
