= New Somerset, Ohio =

- Unincorporated community
- Location within Ohio
- Coordinates: 40°30′57″N 80°42′21″W
- Country: United States
- State: Ohio
- Counties: Jefferson
- Elevation: 1,207 ft (368 m)
- Time zone: UTC-5 (Eastern (EST))
  - Summer (DST): UTC-4 (EDT)
- ZIP code: 43964
- Area code: 740
- GNIS feature ID: 1062552

New Somerset is an unincorporated community in northern Knox Township, Jefferson County, Ohio, United States. It lies south of Hammondsville along State Route 213.

New Somerset is part of the Weirton–Steubenville, WV-OH Metropolitan Statistical Area.

== History ==
Baltzer Culp was one of the first white settlers in the township, arriving in 1800. He laid out New Somerset in February 1816, making it the oldest community in the township. It was originally laid out with lots measuring 60 by 150 feet (18 by 46 m) and streets 50 feet (15 m) wide. The first church was established in 1836 by Rev. Joshua Monroe at the north end of the community, and a second in 1840. A post office called New Somerset was established on April 10, 1851, and the community had a population of 77 in 1870, the largest it ever grew. The community slowly faded over time, and the post office was ultimately discontinued on December 14, 1907.

== Geography ==
New Somerset is located approximately 5 miles (8.0 km) south of Hammondsville, 15 miles (24 km) north of Steubenville, and about 3 miles (4.8 km) east of Holt. It is a little over 1 mile (1.6 km) southeast of the Yellow Creek, a small tributary of the Ohio River, which itself is located 4 miles (6.4 km) to the east of New Somerset.
