= Parfitt =

Parfitt may refer to:

- Andy Parfitt (born 1958), British businessman
- Bill Parfitt, British businessman
- Clarence Parfitt (born 1944), Bermudian and Scottish cricketer
- Chris Parfitt, American guitarist
- Cyril Parfitt (1914–2011), British artist
- David Parfitt (born 1958), film producer and actor
- Fred Parfitt (1869–1953), Welsh rugby player
- Harold Parfitt (Panama Canal) (1921–2006), Governor of the Panama Canal Zone, 1975-1979
- Harold Parfitt (Scouting) (1881–?)
- Jade Parfitt (born 1978), British model and presenter
- Judy Parfitt (born 1935), English actress
- Peter Parfitt (born 1936), English cricketer
- Richard Parfitt, Welsh musician
- Rick Parfitt (1948–2016), English musician
- Robin Parfitt (1946–2006), English educator
- Thomas Parfitt (1911–1984), bishop of Madagascar
- Tudor Parfitt (born 1944), British historian, broadcaster and adventurer

== See also ==
- Parfit
- Parfait
- Parlett
