= Olszeski Town, Ohio =

- Unincorporated community
- Location within Ohio
- Coordinates: 40°11′40″N 80°47′19″W
- Country: United States
- State: Ohio
- Counties: Jefferson
- Elevation: 761 ft (232 m)
- Time zone: UTC-5 (Eastern (EST))
  - Summer (DST): UTC-4 (EDT)
- ZIP code: 43917
- Area code: 740
- GNIS feature ID: 1057900

Olszeski Town (previously also known as Mount Pleasant) is an unincorporated community in Mount Pleasant Township, Jefferson County, Ohio, United States. It is located between Dillonvale and Dunglen along County Route 7 and Short Creek.
