= W. H. Sammis Power Plant =

Coal-fired power station in Jefferson County, Ohio

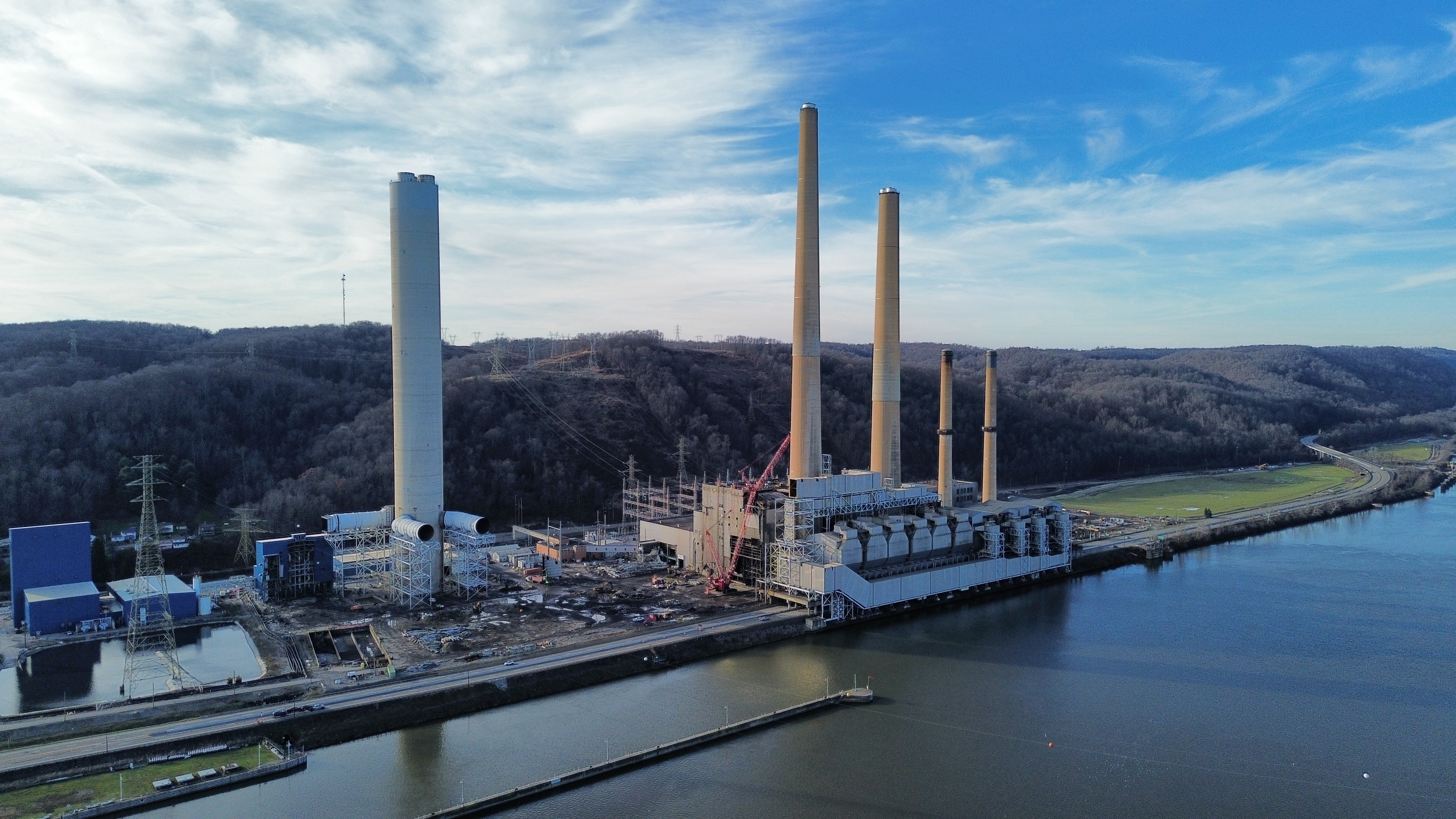
- Sammis Power Plant undergoing decommissioning in December 2024
- Country: United States
- Location: Stratton, Jefferson County, Ohio
- Coordinates: 40°31′48″N 80°37′51″W
- Status: Retired (2023)
- Construction began: 1956
- Commission date: Units 1–2: 1960; Units 3–4: 1962; Unit 5: 1967; Unit 6: 1969; Unit 7: 1971
- Decommission date: Units 1–4: May 31, 2020; Units 5–7: May 3, 2023 Diesel Peaking Units: May 3, 2023
- Owners: Ohio Edison, FirstEnergy, Energy Harbor
- Operator: Energy Harbor
- Employees: ~450

Thermal power station
- Primary fuel: Coal; Fuel Oil
- Chimneys: 5

Power generation
- Units operational: Units 1-4: 4 x 180 MW; Unit 5: 300MW; Units 6-7: 2 x 600MW; Diesel Peaking Units: 12.5MW (5x 2.5MW)
- Make and model: Units 1-2: General Electric; Units 3-7: Westinghouse
- Nameplate capacity: 2,233 MW

External links
- Commons: Related media on Commons

The W. H. Sammis Power Plant was a 2.23-gigawatt (2,233 MW) coal power plant in Stratton, Jefferson County, Ohio. The plant was operated by Energy Harbor. It began operations in 1960.

== History ==
Ohio Edison broke ground for W.H. Sammis in May 1956. The plan originally called for the construction of two, 170 MW units. In September 1956, Ohio Edison announced they would double the facility with two additional units also at 170 MW each. The first four units of Sammis were finished between 1960 and 1962 at cost of $118 million. It was dedicated in 1960 for Ohio Edison president and CEO, Walter H. Sammis. Unit 5 was completed in 1967. Unit 6 began operations in 1969 at a cost of $75 million. The unit had an operating capacity of 625 MW. During construction of Unit 6, its stator, constructed by Westinghouse, was featured on the cover in a March 1967 issue of Forbes. Unit 7, with an operating capacity of 650 MW, began operations in 1971. Unit 7's chimney had a height of 1,001 feet (305 m).

The power plant includes a four-lane tunnel for State Route 7, constructed in 1982 at a cost of $27 million. The road goes under the baghouse structure. FirstEnergy assumed operations of Sammis after the former operator, Ohio Edison merged with Centerior in 1997.

Due to low wholesale power prices in 2012 exacerbated by the supply of natural gas, FirstEnergy temporarily idled Sammis.

FirstEnergy announced in July 2016 that it would retire its four oldest units of Sammis in 2020 due to increasing costs and market forces. Only 1,500 MW from three units would remain generating electricity. FirstEnergy Solutions had announced in August 2018 that they will shut down the three remaining units at Sammis by June 2022. FirstEnergy Solutions blamed the wholesale market system, which PJM Interconnection operates on, for not relying on coal and nuclear plants. Murray Energy, a supplier of coal for Sammis, floated the possibility of buying the plant and to continue operating it. Ultimately, the retirements of the final three units were rescinded in July 2019 when the State of Ohio passed and signed into law a subsidy to support FirstEnergy Solutions' Perry Nuclear Generating Station and Davis–Besse Nuclear Power Station. However, the bill itself was a part of a public corruption scheme revealed by the United States Department of Justice (DOJ) in July 2020.

Energy Harbor announced in March 2022 that it would close Units 5, 6, and 7 by June 2023. The plants then officially closed a month earlier than expected on May 3, 2023.

== Environmental mitigation ==
Sammis was subjected to a suit by the Environmental Protection Agency (EPA) for violating the Clean Air Act in 1978. The EPA charged that Ohio Edison was emitting 50 times more pollution than allotted at Sammis. Ohio Edison reached a settlement with the EPA to implement pollution controls. To resolve the persistent pollution issues raised by the EPA, Ohio Edison constructed a $445 million structure for electrostatic precipitators on top of tunnel over State Route 7. Sammis was again the subject of another Clean Air Act case by the EPA filed in 1999. To satisfy the EPA's request to reduce air pollution, FirstEnergy commissioned a $1.8 billion construction project in 2005. Construction was designed and managed by Bechtel. The plant was retrofitted with selective catalytic reduction (SCR) systems and scrubbers by Babcock & Wilcox to reduce sulfur dioxide (SO_{2}) and nitrogen oxide (NO_{x}) emissions by 95% and 90% respectively. A new 850 feet (260 m) chimney for the flue-gas desulfurization (FGD) process was constructed to support the scrubbers. The project was completed in 2010.

== See also ==
- List of largest power stations in the United States
- List of power stations in Ohio
