= Jackson Heights, Ohio =

Jackson Heights, Ohio may refer to:

- Jackson Heights, Jackson County, Ohio
- Jackson Heights, Jefferson County, Ohio
