= Cross Creek Township =

Cross Creek Township may refer to the following townships in the United States:

- Cross Creek Township, Ohio
- Cross Creek Township, Washington County, Pennsylvania
