= Shady Glen, Ohio =

- Unincorporated community
- Location within Ohio
- Coordinates: 40°28′48″N 80°38′23″W
- Country: United States
- State: Ohio
- Counties: Jefferson
- Elevation: 1,047 ft (319 m)
- Time zone: UTC-5 (Eastern (EST))
  - Summer (DST): UTC-4 (EDT)
- ZIP code: 43964
- Area code: 740
- GNIS feature ID: 1046108

Shady Glen is an unincorporated community in Knox Township, Jefferson County, Ohio, United States. It is located west of Calumet along the John F. Kennedy Highway (County Route 47) at its intersection with Brandywine Road (Township Road 244).
