= McIntyre, Ohio =

- Unincorporated community
- Location within Ohio
- Coordinates: 40°18′24″N 80°46′52″W
- Country: United States
- State: Ohio
- Counties: Jefferson
- Elevation: 1,135 ft (346 m)
- Time zone: UTC-5 (Eastern (EST))
  - Summer (DST): UTC-4 (EDT)
- ZIP code: 43910
- Area code: 740
- GNIS feature ID: 1048959

McIntyre is an unincorporated community in Wayne Township, Jefferson County, Ohio, United States. It is located southeast of Bloomingdale and just east of Chandler along Township Road 191.
