= Newell, Ohio =

- Unincorporated community
- Location within Ohio
- Coordinates: 40°15′37″N 80°50′10″W
- Country: United States
- State: Ohio
- Counties: Jefferson
- Elevation: 991 ft (302 m)
- Time zone: UTC-5 (Eastern (EST))
  - Summer (DST): UTC-4 (EDT)
- ZIP code: 43901
- Area code: 740
- GNIS feature ID: 1049012

Newell is an unincorporated community in Smithfield Township, Jefferson County, Ohio, United States. It is located west of Smithfield and just northwest of Piney Fork at the intersection of Piney Fork Road (County Route 11) and Newell Road (Township Route 134).
