= Panhandle (disambiguation) =

A panhandle is a geographic term for an elongated protrusion of a geopolitical entity.

Panhandle may also refer to:

== Places in North America ==
=== The United States ===
- Alaskan Panhandle
- Alabama Panhandle
- Connecticut Panhandle
- Florida Panhandle
- Idaho Panhandle
  - Idaho Panhandle National Forests
- Maryland Panhandle
- Nebraska Panhandle
- Oklahoma Panhandle
- Panhandle (San Francisco), a park in San Francisco, California
- Panhandle, Ohio
- Panhandle, Texas
  - Texas Panhandle
- Eastern Panhandle of West Virginia
- Northern Panhandle of West Virginia

=== Canada ===
- Madawaska County, New Brunswick, also known as the "New Brunswick Panhandle"

== Other uses ==
- Panhandle (film), a 1948 film
- Panhandle Pete, a character from the game Adventures in the Magic Kingdom
- Panhandle (TV series), a television series
- Columbus Panhandles, a former National Football league team
- Begging, which is sometimes referred to as "panhandling"
