= Fernwood Park =

Fernwood Park may refer to:

- Fernwood Park Historic District, in Monroe County, New York
- Fernwood Park Housing Project, in Fernwood, Chicago
  - Fernwood Park race riot at the Fernwood Park Housing Project

== See also ==
- Fernwood (disambiguation)
