= Warrenton =

Warrenton may refer to the following places:

== South Africa ==
- Warrenton, Northern Cape, a town

== United States ==
- Warrenton, Georgia, a city
- Warrenton, Indiana, an extinct town
- Warrenton, Gibson County, Indiana, an unincorporated town
- Warrenton, Mississippi, an unincorporated community
- Warrenton, Missouri, a city
  - Warrenton High School (Missouri), a school located in Warrenton, Missouri
- Warrenton, North Carolina, a town
- Warrenton, Ohio, an unincorporated community
- Warrenton, Oregon, a town
- Warrenton, Texas, an unincorporated community
- Warrenton, Virginia, a town
  - Warrenton Training Center, a Central Intelligence Agency communications facility
