= Jackson Heights (disambiguation) =

Jackson Heights may refer to:

== Places ==
Canada

- Jackson Heights, Edmonton, Alberta

United States

- Jackson Heights, Tampa, Florida
- Jackson Heights, Queens, New York
- Jackson Heights, Jackson County, Ohio
- Jackson Heights, Jefferson County, Ohio

== Other uses ==
- Jackson Heights (band)
- Jackson Heights (TV series), a Pakistani drama serial

== See also ==
- 82nd Street–Jackson Heights station, a subway station in New York City
- Jackson Heights–Roosevelt Avenue/74th Street station, a subway station complex in New York City
