= Deandale, Ohio =

- Unincorporated community
- Location within Ohio
- Coordinates: 40°18′33″N 80°36′59″W
- Country: United States
- State: Ohio
- Counties: Jefferson
- Elevation: 676 ft (206 m)
- Time zone: UTC-5 (Eastern (EST))
  - Summer (DST): UTC-4 (EDT)
- ZIP code: 43938
- Area code: 740
- GNIS feature ID: 1048652

Deandale is an unincorporated community in Steubenville Township, Jefferson County, Ohio, United States. It is located about 1 mile (1.6 km) south of Mingo Junction along Ohio State Route 7.

Located along the Ohio River, Deandale was described as a hamlet in 1910. The Ohio Valley Brass and Iron Company built a foundry there in 1911.
