= Costonia, Ohio =

Unincorporated community in Ohio, U.S.

Coordinates: 40°25′37″N 80°37′04″W

Costonia is an unincorporated community in Jefferson County, in the U.S. state of Ohio.

== History ==
A post office called Costonia was established in 1897, and remained in operation until 1937. Besides the post office, Costonia had a country store.
