= Parlett =

Parlett is an English surname. Notable people with the surname include:

- Blake Parlett (born 1989), Canadian ice hockey player
- David Parlett (born 1939), games scholar, historian, and translator
- Reg Parlett (1904–1991), English comic book artist

== See also ==
- Parlett, Ohio, an unincorporated community
- Parlet, band
