= Fernwood =

Fernwood may refer to:

== Places ==
Canada

- Fernwood, Greater Victoria, a neighbourhood of Victoria, British Columbia
- Fernwood, Halifax, a Gothic Revival–style villa designated as a National Historic Site of Canada

South Africa

- Fernwood, a suburb in Somerset West

United Kingdom

- Fernwood, Nottinghamshire, a parish in Newark and Sherwood District

United States of America

- Fernwood, California (disambiguation), multiple locations
- Fernwood, Idaho
- Fernwood, Chicago, Illinois
- Fernwood, Mississippi
- Fernwood Botanical Garden and Nature Preserve, Niles, Michigan
- Fernwood, New Jersey
- Fernwood, Ohio

== Other uses ==
- Fernwood Publishing, a book publishing company specialising in books about left-wing politics
- Fernwood 2Nite, a comedic television program from 1977
