= Grandview Heights, Jefferson County, Ohio =

Grandview Heights, Ohio
- Unincorporated community
- Location within Ohio
- Coordinates: 40°10′14″N 80°42′33″W
- Country: United States
- State: Ohio
- Counties: Jefferson
- Elevation: 1,096 ft (334 m)
- Time zone: UTC-5 (Eastern (EST))
  - Summer (DST): UTC-4 (EDT)
- ZIP code: 43943
- Area code: 740
- GNIS feature ID: 1084623

Grandview Heights is an unincorporated community in Warren Township, Jefferson County, Ohio, United States. It is located just west of Tiltonsville on Jackson Heights Road (Township Road 109A).
