= Ohio State Route 213 =

State highway in Jefferson County, Ohio, US

State Route 213

Route information
- Maintained by ODOT
- Length: 18.61 mi (29.95 km)
- Existed: 1924–present

Major junctions
- South end: SR 7 near Steubenville
- SR 152 in Knox Township
- North end: SR 7 near Wellsville

Location
- Country: United States
- State: Ohio
- Counties: Jefferson

Highway system
- Ohio State Highway System; Interstate; US; State; Scenic
← SR 212	→ SR 214

State Route 213 (SR 213) is a north–south state highway located in the eastern part of the U.S. state of Ohio. The highway's southern terminus is at an interchange that doubles as the northern split of the concurrency of U.S. Route 22 and State Route 7 just north of the city limits of Steubenville. State Route 213's northern terminus is also at State Route 7, this time approximately 1 mile (1.6 km) south of the village of Wellsville, Ohio.

== Route description ==
All of State Route 213 is nestled within the northeastern quadrant of Jefferson County. There is no portion of this highway that is included as a part of the National Highway System.

== History ==
SR 213 was designated in 1924, routed along the same alignment within Jefferson County that it maintains at this point in history. No major changes have taken place to the highway's routing since it was established.

== Major intersections ==
The entire route is in Jefferson County.

Location	mi	km	Destinations	Notes
Island Creek Township	0.00	0.00	SR 7 to US 22 east – Steubenville	
Island Creek Township	0.05	0.080	To US 22 west / Alter Avenue – Cadiz	
Knox Township	8.83	14.21	SR 152 north – Empire	Southern end of SR 152 concurrency
Knox Township	9.70	15.61	SR 152 south – Richmond	Southern end of SR 152 concurrency
Saline Township	18.61	29.95	SR 7 – East Liverpool	
1.000 mi = 1.609 km; 1.000 km = 0.621 mi: Concurrency terminus
