= Pottery Addition, Ohio =

- Census-designated place
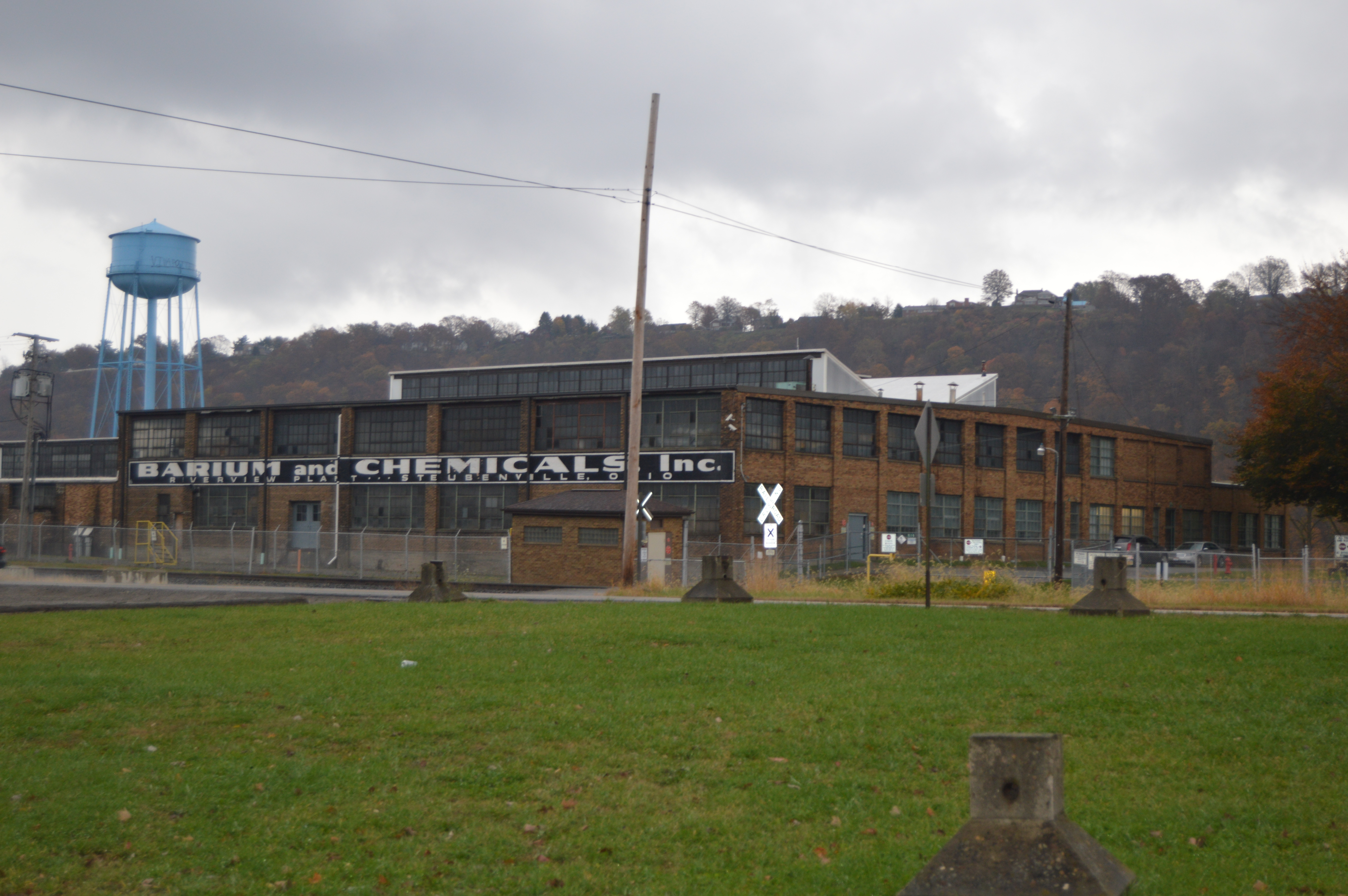
- Steubenville Pottery Company buildings on Old State Route 7

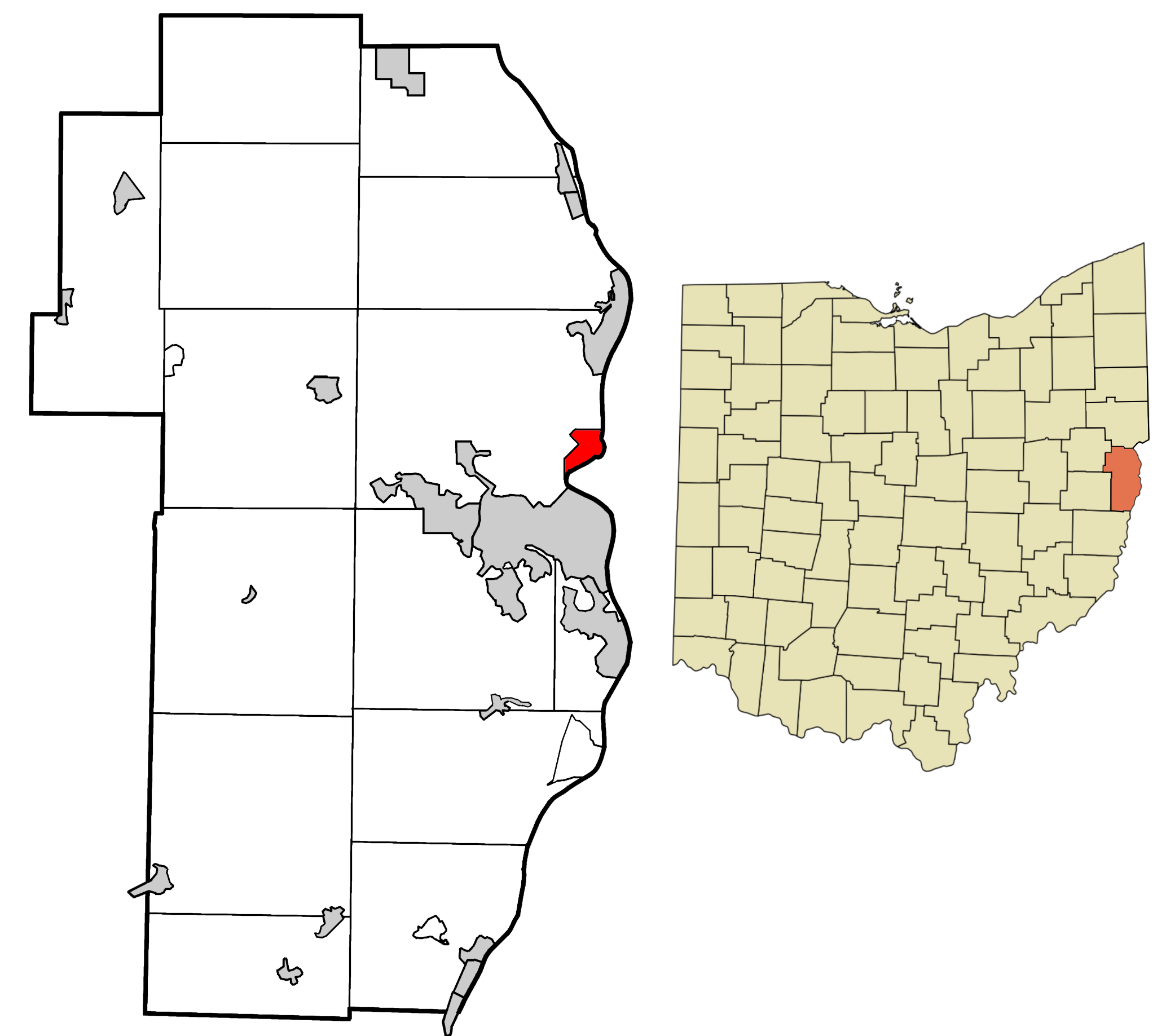
- Location of Pottery Addition in Jefferson County and in the state of Ohio
- Coordinates: 40°24′06″N 80°37′38″W
- Country: United States
- State: Ohio
- County: Jefferson
- Township: Island Creek

Area
  - Total: 1.09 sq mi (2.83 km^{2})
  - Land: 0.85 sq mi (2.19 km^{2})
  - Water: 0.25 sq mi (0.64 km^{2})
- Elevation: 689 ft (210 m)

Population (2020)
  - Total: 258
  - Density: 305/sq mi (117.7/km^{2})
- Time zone: UTC-5 (Eastern (EST))
  - Summer (DST): UTC-4 (EDT)
- Area codes: 740 & 220
- GNIS feature ID: 2628954
- FIPS code: 39-64472

Pottery Addition is a census-designated place (CDP) in Jefferson County, Ohio, United States. Its population was 258 as of the 2020 census. The community is located along the Ohio River and is served by Ohio State Route 7.

== Geography ==
Pottery Addition is in eastern Jefferson County, in the southeast corner of Island Creek Township. It is bordered to the east by the Ohio River, which serves as the border between Jefferson County, Ohio, and Hancock County, West Virginia. Weirton, West Virginia, is directly across the river. The southern tip of Pottery Addition touches the border of Steubenville, the Jefferson county seat. State Route 7, a four-lane freeway which runs through the community, leads north (upriver) 5 miles (8 km) to Toronto and south 4 miles (6 km) to the center of Steubenville.

According to the U.S. Census Bureau, the CDP has an area of 1.093 square miles (2.83 km^{2}); 0.908 square miles (2.35 km^{2}) of its area is land, and 0.185 square miles (0.48 km^{2}) is water.

== Demographics ==
Historical population
Census	Pop.	Note	%±
2020	258		—
U.S. Decennial Census
