= Herrick, Ohio =

Extinct town in Ohio, U.S.

Coordinates: 40°12′35″N 80°49′50″W

Herrick is an extinct town in Jefferson County, in the U.S. state of Ohio. The GNIS classifies it as a populated place.

== History ==
A post office called Herrick was established in 1904, and remained in operation until 1930. Herrick was originally a mining community and the O'Neal Coal Mining Company operated there.
