= Osage, Ohio =

Unincorporated community in Ohio, U.S.

Coordinates: 40°28′28″N 80°43′19″W

Osage is an unincorporated community in Jefferson County, in the U.S. state of Ohio.

== History ==
A post office called Osage was established in 1890, and remained in operation until 1909. Besides the post office, Osage had a Lutheran church.
