= Weems, Ohio =

Unincorporated community in Ohio, U.S.

Coordinates: 40°17′10″N 80°45′15″W

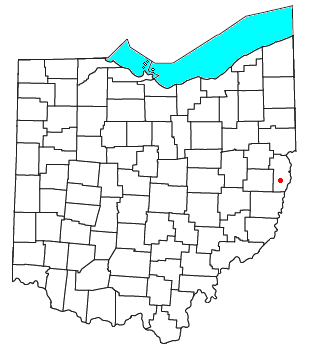
Location of Weems, Ohio

Weems, also known as Smithfield Station, is a small unincorporated community in northwestern Wells Township, Jefferson County, Ohio, United States. The town began with a post office and butcher shop. The town still claims an active community church today. It is located near State Route 151.

Weems is part of the Weirton–Steubenville, WV-OH Metropolitan Statistical Area.

Public education in the community of Weems is provided by the Buckeye Local School District.
