= Pravo, Ohio =

Unincorporated community in Ohio, U.S.

Coordinates: 40°31′09″N 80°49′57″W

Pravo is an unincorporated community in Jefferson County, in the U.S. state of Ohio.

== History ==
A post office called Pravo was established in 1892, and remained in operation until 1907. Besides the post office, Pravo had a Methodist Episcopal church.
