= Robyville, Ohio =

- Unincorporated community
- Location within Ohio
- Coordinates: 40°12′25″N 80°52′45″W
- Country: United States
- State: Ohio
- Counties: Jefferson
- Elevation: 932 ft (284 m)
- Time zone: UTC-5 (Eastern (EST))
  - Summer (DST): UTC-4 (EDT)
- ZIP code: 43901
- Area code: 740
- GNIS feature ID: 1049127

Robyville is an unincorporated community in Smithfield Township, Jefferson County, Ohio, United States. It is located southwest of Adena on Hanna Avenue.

Robyville was a company town for the Roby Coal Company, which operated multiple large mines nearby. The Robyville Post Office was established on August 15, 1902 and discontinued on August 31, 1928. Mail service is now handled through the Adena branch.
