= Alikanna, Ohio =

Unincorporated community in Ohio, U.S.

Coordinates: 40°23′15″N 80°38′09″W

Alikanna is an unincorporated community in Jefferson County, in the U.S. state of Ohio.

== History ==
Alikanna had its start in 1873 when an iron works was built there. A post office called Alikanna was established in 1889, and was discontinued in 1893. The community's name is an amalgamation of Alexander and Anna, the names of two early settlers.
