= Bradley, Ohio =

Unincorporated community in Ohio, U.S.

Coordinates: 40°14′49″N 80°46′32″W

Bradley is an unincorporated community in Jefferson County, in the U.S. state of Ohio.

== History ==
Bradley had its start as a mining community. A post office called Bradley was established in 1904, and remained in operation until 1964. Besides the post office, Bradley had a country store.
