= Deyarmonville, Ohio =

Unincorporated community in Ohio, U.S.

Coordinates: 40°12′42″N 80°45′41″W

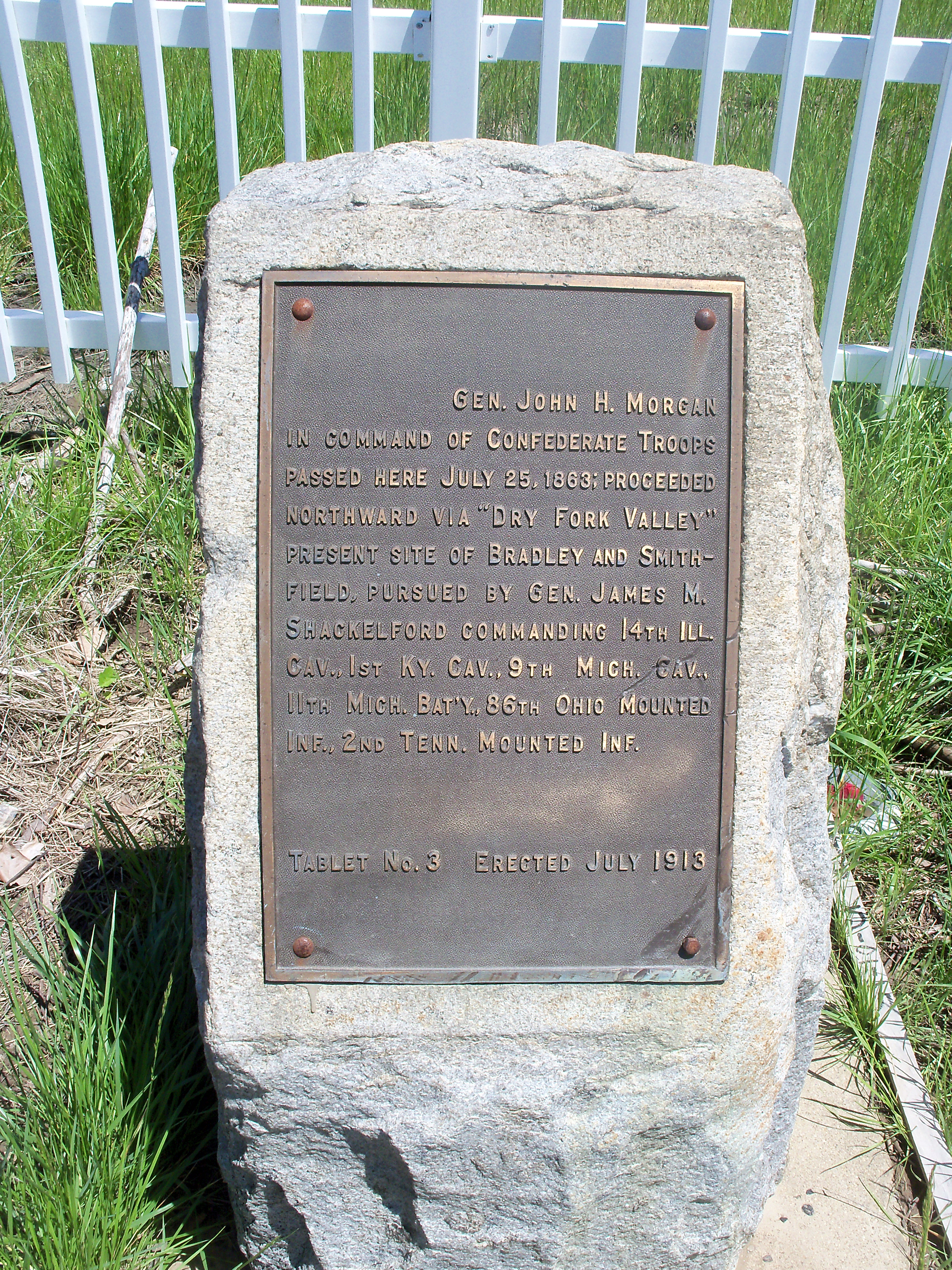
Confederate General John Hunt Morgan passed through here on Morgan's Raid in 1863.

Deyarmonville is an unincorporated community in Jefferson County, in the U.S. state of Ohio.

Deyarmonville once had a one-room schoolhouse.
