= Reeds Mill, Ohio =

Unincorporated community in Ohio, U.S.

Coordinates: 40°21′36″N 80°44′54″W

Location of Reeds Mill within Ohio

Reeds Mill is an unincorporated community in Jefferson County, in the U.S. state of Ohio.

== History ==
A post office called Reeds Mills was established in 1879, and remained in operation until 1933. The namesake Reed's Mill was a gristmill operated by Joseph Reed on Cedar Lick.
