= Stratton, Ohio =

- Village
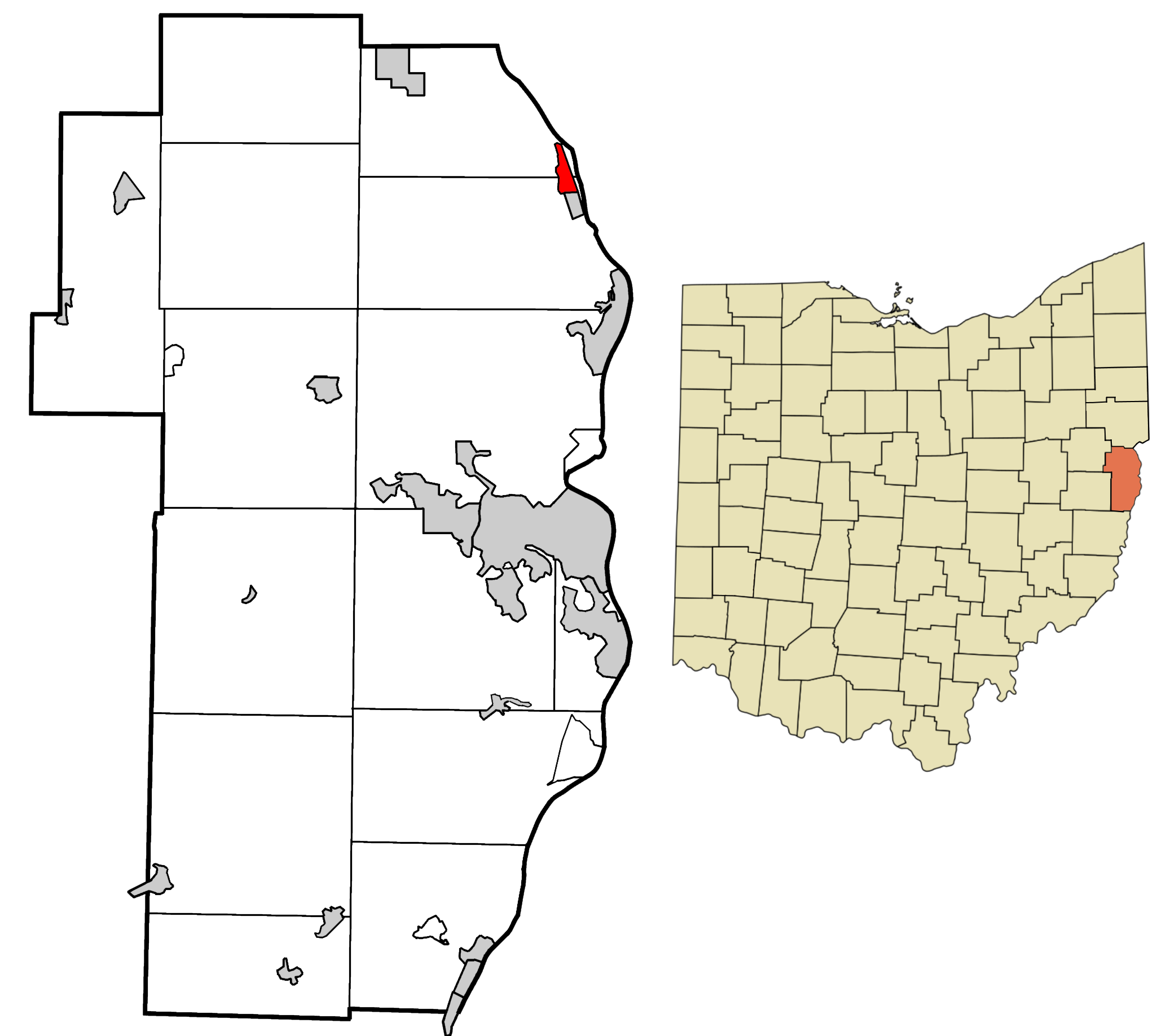
- Location of Stratton in Jefferson County, Ohio

- Location within Ohio Location within the United States
- Coordinates: 40°31′23″N 80°37′46″W
- Country: United States
- State: Ohio
- County: Jefferson
- Townships: Knox, Saline

Area
  - Total: 0.54 sq mi (1.39 km^{2})
  - Land: 0.54 sq mi (1.39 km^{2})
  - Water: 0 sq mi (0.00 km^{2})
- Elevation: 696 ft (212 m)

Population (2020)
  - Total: 267
  - Density: 498/sq mi (192.1/km^{2})
- Time zone: UTC-5 (Eastern (EST))
  - Summer (DST): UTC-4 (EDT)
- ZIP code: 43961
- Area code: 740
- FIPS code: 39-75000
- GNIS feature ID: 2399917

Stratton is a village in Jefferson County, Ohio, United States, along the Ohio River. The population was 267 at the 2020 census. It is part of the Weirton–Steubenville metropolitan area.

== History ==
Stratton gained international attention in 2002 when it lost before the United States Supreme Court in the matter of Watchtower Society v. Village of Stratton, a case in which a town ordinance's provisions making it a misdemeanor to engage in door-to-door advocacy without first registering with town officials and receiving a permit violates the First Amendment as it applies to religious proselytizing, anonymous political speech and the distribution of handbills.

== Geography ==
According to the United States Census Bureau, the village has a total area of 0.54 square miles (1.40 km^{2}), all land.

== Demographics ==
Historical population
| Census | Pop. | Note | %± |
|---|---|---|---|
| 1920 | 593 | | — |
| 1930 | 791 | | 33.4% |
| 1940 | 579 | | −26.8% |
| 1950 | 467 | | −19.3% |
| 1960 | 311 | | −33.4% |
| 1970 | 386 | | 24.1% |
| 1980 | 356 | | −7.8% |
| 1990 | 278 | | −21.9% |
| 2000 | 277 | | −0.4% |
| 2010 | 294 | | 6.1% |
| 2020 | 267 | | −9.2% |
U.S. Decennial Census

=== 2010 census ===
As of the census of 2010, there were 294 people, 145 households, and 76 families living in the village. The population density was 544.4 inhabitants per square mile (210.2/km^{2}). There were 151 housing units at an average density of 279.6 per square mile (108.0/km^{2}). The racial makeup of the village was 99.0% White and 1.0% from two or more races. Hispanic or Latino of any race were 1.4% of the population.

There were 145 households, of which 24.1% had children under the age of 18 living with them, 36.6% were married couples living together, 10.3% had a female householder with no husband present, 5.5% had a male householder with no wife present, and 47.6% were non-families. 45.5% of all households were made up of individuals, and 19.3% had someone living alone who was 65 years of age or older. The average household size was 2.03 and the average family size was 2.87.

The median age in the village was 49.5 years. 20.1% of residents were under the age of 18; 5.8% were between the ages of 18 and 24; 17.6% were from 25 to 44; 30.6% were from 45 to 64; and 25.9% were 65 years of age or older. The gender makeup of the village was 46.9% male and 53.1% female.

=== 2000 census ===
As of the census of 2000, there were 277 people, 140 households, and 75 families living in the village. The population density was 521.0 inhabitants per square mile (201.2/km^{2}). There were 146 housing units at an average density of 274.6 per square mile (106.0/km^{2}). The racial makeup of the village was 97.83% White, 0.36% African American and 1.81% Asian. Hispanic or Latino of any race were 0.36% of the population.

There were 140 households, out of which 18.6% had children under the age of 18 living with them, 37.9% were married couples living together, 12.1% had a female householder with no husband present, and 46.4% were non-families. 44.3% of all households were made up of individuals, and 22.1% had someone living alone who was 65 years of age or older. The average household size was 1.98 and the average family size was 2.75.

In the village, the population was spread out, with 17.7% under the age of 18, 6.5% from 18 to 24, 26.4% from 25 to 44, 27.1% from 45 to 64, and 22.4% who were 65 years of age or older. The median age was 45 years. For every 100 females, there were 83.4 males. For every 100 females age 18 and over, there were 82.4 males.

The median income for a household in the village was $25,179, and the median income for a family was $36,875. Males had a median income of $32,813 versus $17,250 for females. The per capita income for the village was $16,967. About 5.9% of families and 7.6% of the population were below the poverty line, including 13.7% of those under the age of eighteen and 2.6% of those 65 or over.

== Economy ==
A major local employer was the W. H. Sammis Power Plant, a 2.23-gigawatt (2,233 MW) coal power plant along the Ohio River. The first units of the plant began operating in 1960. The plant closed in 2023.

== Education ==
Public education in the village of Stratton is provided by the Edison Local School District. Campuses serving the village include Stanton Elementary School (Preschool-Grade 8) and Edison High School (Grades 9-12).

== See also ==
- List of cities and towns along the Ohio River
