= Middleburg, Jefferson County, Ohio =

Unincorporated community in Jefferson County, Ohio

Middleburg
- Unincorporated community
- Location of Middleburg in Ohio
- Coordinates: 40°27′17″N 80°52′49″W
- Country: United States
- State: Ohio
- County: Jefferson County

Middleburg is an unincorporated community in Jefferson County, in the U.S. state of Ohio.
