= Georges Run, Ohio =

Unincorporated community in Ohio, U.S.

Coordinates: 40°18′02″N 80°37′31″W

Georges Run is an unincorporated community in Jefferson County, in the U.S. state of Ohio.

== History ==
A post office called Georges Run was established in 1904, and remained in operation until 1907. The community took its name from nearby Georges Run creek.
