= Ramsey, Ohio =

Unincorporated community in Ohio, U.S.

Coordinates: 40°11′34″N 80°50′00″W

Ramsey is an unincorporated community in Jefferson County, in the U.S. state of Ohio.

== History ==
A post office called Ramsey was established in 1904, and remained in operation until 1928. Besides the post office, Ramsey had a country store.
