= Port Homer, Ohio =

Unincorporated community in Ohio, U.S.

Coordinates: 40°32′38″N 80°38′24″W

Port Homer is an unincorporated community in Jefferson County, in the U.S. state of Ohio.

== History ==
A post office called Port Homer was established in 1841, and remained in operation until 1943. The community was named for Homer Wallace, the son of an early settler.
