= Jefferson County Christian School =

Location
- 125 Fernwood Road; Wintersville, (Jefferson County), Ohio; United States; 40°22′24″N 80°41′57″W

Information
- Type: Private, Coeducational
- Religious affiliations: Christian, Non-denominational
- Established: 1978
- School board: Katie Anderson(President)
- Administrator: Scott Abercrombie
- Principal: Julie Lewis
- Color: Purple
- Athletics conference: SWCAC
- Mascot: Royal Lion
- Website: myjccs.org

Jefferson County Christian School (established in 1978) is a private Christian school located in Wintersville, Ohio. It is a non-denominational Christian school.

== About ==
Jefferson County Christian School (JCCS) includes classes from Pre-K up to the 12th grade. JCCS has been graduating classes since 1997. At JCCS students are given ample opportunity to grow in many different aspects of Christian life, from early learning, all the way to High School with the annual spring musical to varsity athletics. Its competitive sports program has brought teams to 6 championship games (4 girls & 2 boys) in the past year.

JCCS is currently administered by Mrs. Lori Jarrett and various teachers and volunteers.

== Athletics ==
Jefferson County Christian School competes in the SWCAC.

- Fall Sports
- Boys
- Varsity Soccer
- Junior High Basketball
- Junior Varsity Basketball
- Varsity Basketball
- Girls
- Junior High Volleyball
- Junior Varsity Volleyball
- Varsity Volleyball
- Junior High Basketball
- Junior Varsity Basketball
- Varsity Basketball
- Co-Ed
- Junior High Soccer
- Spring Sports
- Boys
- Varsity Baseball
- Girls
- Varsity Softball

== School Events ==
- High School Spring Musical
- Baltimore, MD Trip
- Washington, DC Trip
- New York City Trip

=== High School Spring Musical ===
The JCCS High School has put on a spring musical for 18 years. JCCS has performed Cinderella, Fiddler on the Roof, Beauty and the Beast, Charlie Brown, Pirates of Penzance, Annie, and many more fantastic musicals.

== Student Organizations and Clubs ==
- French Club
- Community Outreach Team
- Chapel Worship Team
- Drama Club
- Performing Arts
- Yearbook Committee
- High School Officers (Council)
