= Wells Township, Jefferson County, Ohio =

Township in Ohio, US

- Township
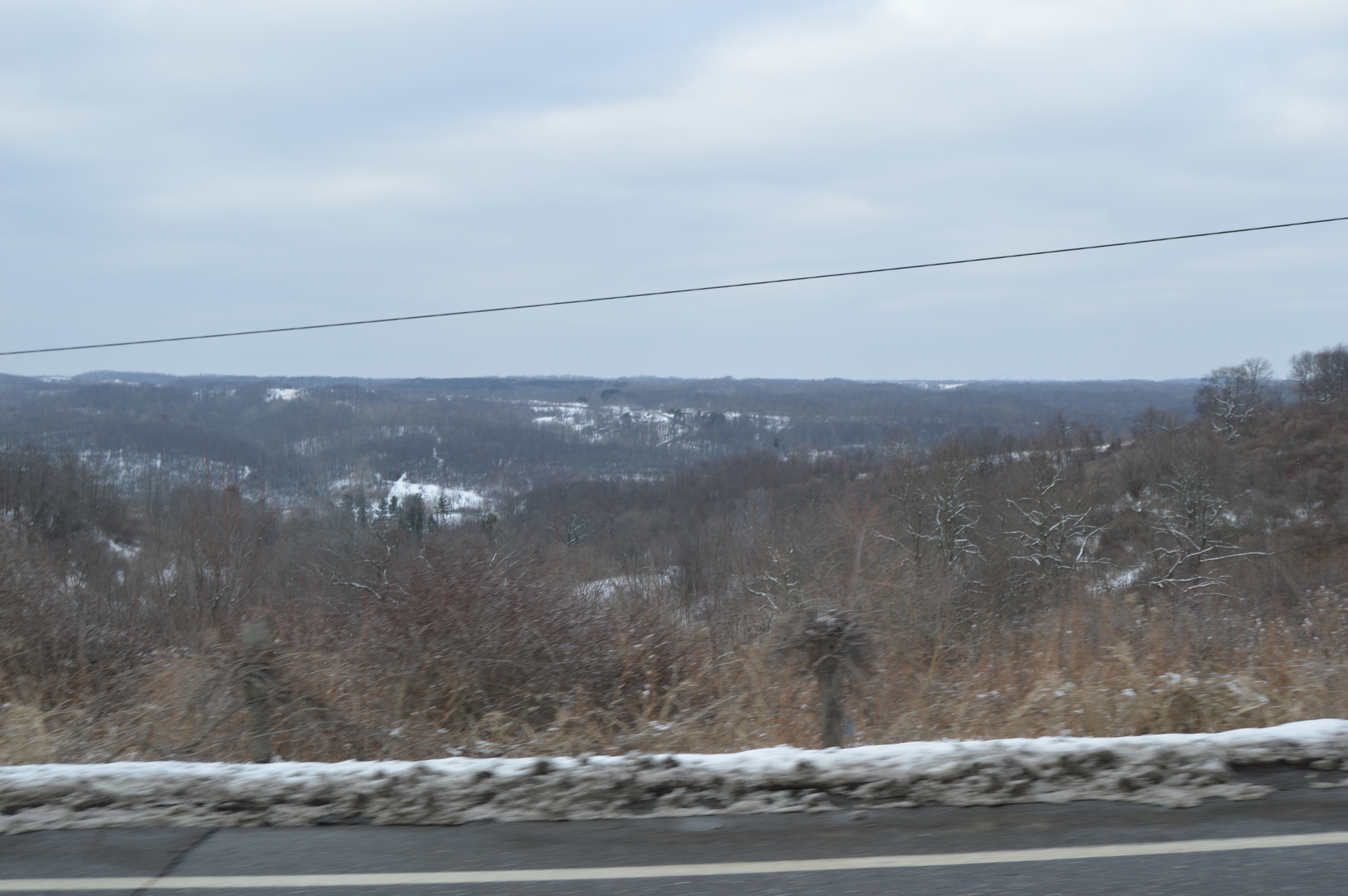
- Hills east of Smithfield on State Route 151

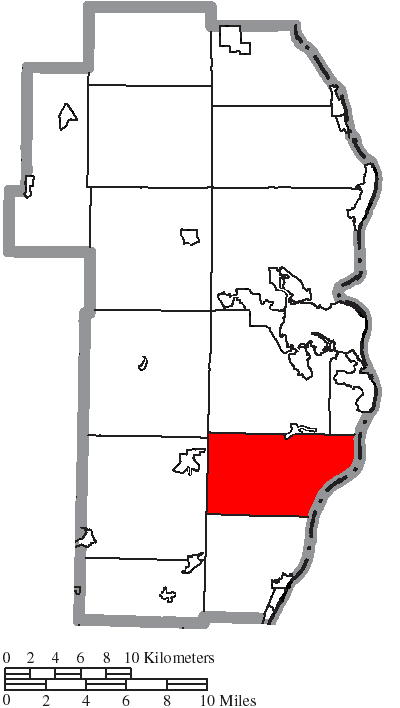
- Location of Wells Township in Jefferson County
- Coordinates: 40°15′43″N 80°39′45″W
- Country: United States
- State: Ohio
- County: Jefferson

Area
  - Total: 27.1 sq mi (70.2 km^{2})
  - Land: 27.1 sq mi (70.1 km^{2})
  - Water: 0 sq mi (0.0 km^{2})
- Elevation: 920 ft (280 m)

Population (2020)
  - Total: 2,491
  - Density: 92.0/sq mi (35.5/km^{2})
- Time zone: UTC-5 (Eastern (EST))
  - Summer (DST): UTC-4 (EDT)
- FIPS code: 39-82698
- GNIS feature ID: 1086390
- Website: https://www.wellstownshipohio.com/

Wells Township is one of the fourteen townships of Jefferson County, Ohio, United States. The 2020 census found 2,491 people in the township.

== Geography ==
Located in the southeastern part of the county along the Ohio River, it borders the following townships:

- Cross Creek Township - north
- Steubenville Township - northeast
- Warren Township - south
- Smithfield Township - west
- Wayne Township - northwest

Brooke County, West Virginia lies across the Ohio River to the east.

Part of the village of New Alexandria is located in northern Wells Township. As well, two unincorporated communities lie in Wells Township: Brilliant in the east, and Weems in the northwest.

== Name and history ==
Wells Township was founded in 1823. It was named for Bezaleel Wells, a founder of Steubenville.

It is the only Wells Township statewide.

== Government ==
The township is governed by a three-member board of trustees, who are elected in November of odd-numbered years to a four-year term beginning on the following January 1. Two are elected in the year after the presidential election and one is elected in the year before it. There is also an elected township fiscal officer, who serves a four-year term beginning on April 1 of the year after the election, which is held in November of the year before the presidential election. Vacancies in the fiscal officership or on the board of trustees are filled by the remaining trustees.
