= Fairplay, Ohio =

Fairplay
- Unincorporated community
- Coordinates: 40°21′46″N 80°48′55″W
- Country: United States
- State: Ohio
- County: Jefferson

Fairplay is an unincorporated community in Jefferson County, in the U.S. state of Ohio.

== History ==
Fairplay was originally called Bloomfield Station. A post office called Fair Play was established in 1860, and remained in operation until 1918.
