= Edison High School (Richmond, Ohio) =

Location
- 9890 State Route 152 North; Richmond, Ohio 43944; United States; 40°26′55″N 80°44′48″W

Information
- Type: Public
- Motto: Embracing Excellence
- Opened: 1939
- School district: Edison Local School District
- CEEB code: 364385
- Principal: Matt Morrison
- Grades: 9-12
- Average class size: 21
- Student to teacher ratio: 20:1
- Campus type: Fringe Rural
- Colors: Silver and black
- Slogan: “Our Black and Silver will always Bare”
- Fight song: Edison Fight Song
- Athletics conference: Ohio Valley Athletic Conference
- Mascot: Eddie the Wildcat
- Team name: Wildcats
- Rival: Indian Creek
- Newspaper: The Paw Print
- Yearbook: Back When…
- Website: edisonwildcats.org/homepage/schools/high-school-junior-high/

Edison High School is a public high school near Richmond, Ohio, United States. It is the only secondary school in the Edison Local School District, covering students from the villages of Amsterdam, Bergholz, Empire, Irondale, Richmond, and Stratton, as well as most unincorporated areas in northern Jefferson County. Athletic teams compete as the Edison Wildcats in the Ohio High School Athletic Association as a member of the Ohio Valley Athletic Conference.

== History ==
The school was formed in the 1980s as Edison South High School from the merger of three existing high schools; the Jefferson Union High School (Yellow Jackets), Stanton High School (Raiders), and Springfield High School (Tigers), represented by a mural on campus. Later, it was merged with Edison North High School in Hammondsville.

== Athletics ==
Edison High School fields athletic teams in football, basketball, track, cross country, volleyball, golf, baseball, soccer, softball, swimming, and wrestling.
