= Gould, Ohio =

Unincorporated community in Ohio, U.S.

Coordinates: 40°19′03″N 80°39′12″W

Gould is an unincorporated community in Jefferson County, in the U.S. state of Ohio.

== History ==
A post office called Gould was established in 1881, and was discontinued in 1884. Besides the post office, Gould had a railroad depot called Gould's Station.
