= Circle Green, Ohio =

Unincorporated community in Ohio, U.S.

Coordinates: 40°29′04″N 80°52′32″W

Circle Green is an unincorporated community in Jefferson County, Ohio, United States.

== History ==
The Circle Green post office closed in 1907. Besides the post office, Circle Green had a Methodist Episcopal church, established in 1809.
