= Emerson, Ohio =

Unincorporated community in Ohio, U.S.

Coordinates: 40°10′39″N 80°49′22″W

Emerson is an unincorporated community in Jefferson County, in the U.S. state of Ohio. Emerson is generally considered as the area stretching from the border of Mount Pleasant, Ohio, to the intersection of Route 250 and Route 150. It extends further to where Jefferson and Belmont 5 converge in Pleasant Grove, Ohio, along Route 250. Finally, it reaches the point where Township Road 128 branches off, connecting to both Route 250 and Pinewood Drive, which continues into Harrisville, Ohio.

== History ==
Emerson was originally called Trenton, and under the latter name was laid out around 1815. A post office called Emerson was established in 1882, and remained in operation until 1932. Besides the post office, Emerson had its own schoolhouse.
