= York, Jefferson County, Ohio =

Unincorporated community in Ohio, U.S.

Coordinates: 40°15′29″N 80°51′52″W

York is an unincorporated community in Jefferson County, in the U.S. state of Ohio.

== History ==
York was laid out in 1815. A post office was established at York in the 1830s.
