= Edison Local School District (Jefferson County) =

School district in Ohio

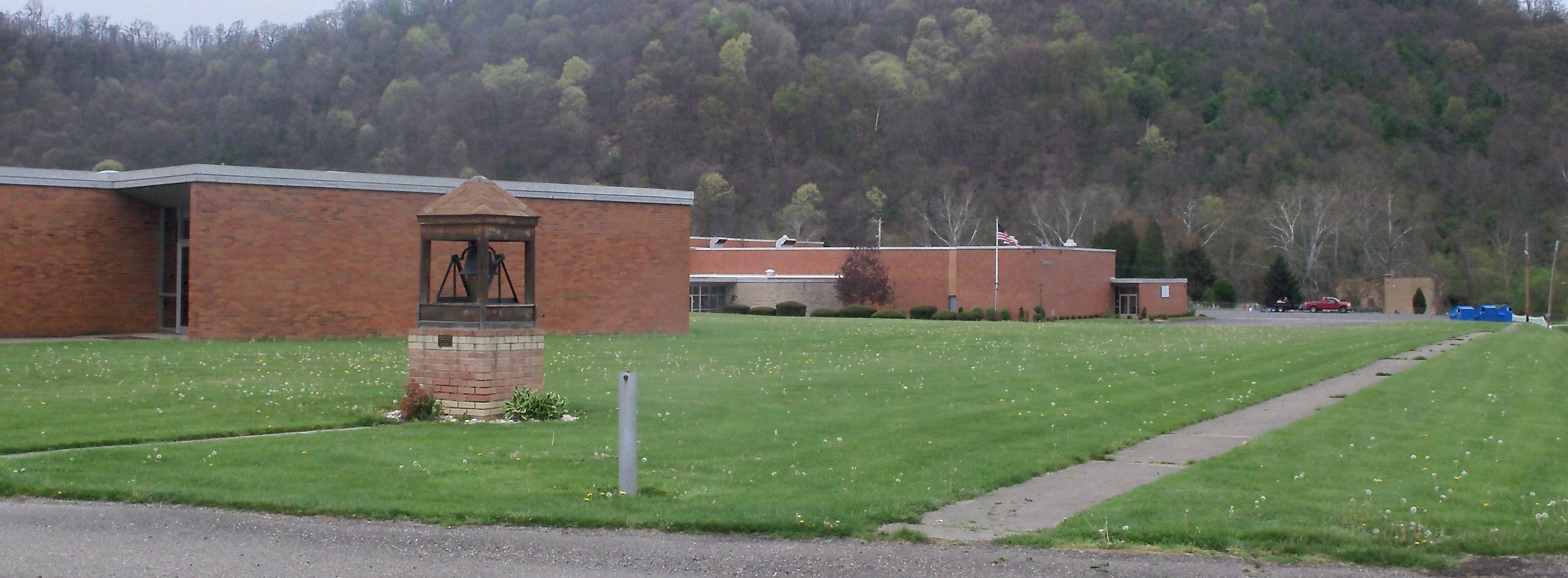
Stanton Elementary in Hammondsville

The Edison Local School District is a public school district based in the community of Hammondsville, Ohio, United States.

The district serves the villages of Amsterdam, Bergholz, Empire, Irondale, Richmond, and Stratton as well as unincorporated areas in northern Jefferson County.

== Schools ==
- Edison High School (grades 7 - 12)
- John Gregg Elementary School (pre-school - grade 6)
- Stanton Elementary School (pre-school - grade 6)

== See also ==
- List of school districts in Ohio
