= New Alexandria, Ohio =

- Village
- Welcome sign near west entrance of the village

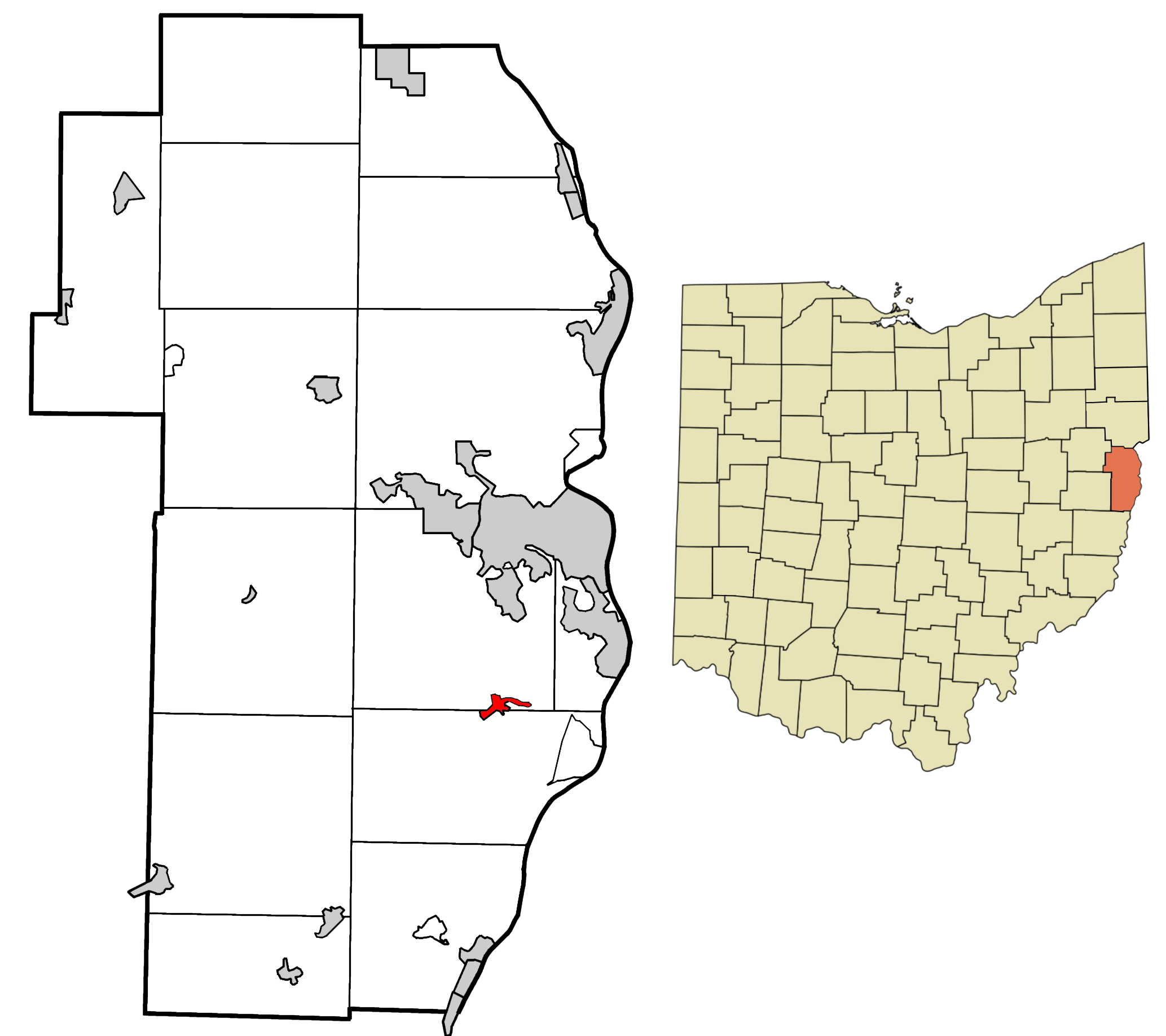
- Location of New Alexandria in Jefferson County, Ohio

- Location within Ohio Location within the United States
- Coordinates: 40°17′30″N 80°40′30″W
- Country: United States
- State: Ohio
- County: Jefferson
- Townships: Cross Creek, Wells

Area
  - Total: 0.37 sq mi (0.95 km^{2})
  - Land: 0.37 sq mi (0.95 km^{2})
  - Water: 0 sq mi (0.00 km^{2})
- Elevation: 1,224 ft (373 m)

Population (2020)
  - Total: 232
  - Density: 632/sq mi (244.2/km^{2})
- Time zone: UTC-5 (Eastern (EST))
  - Summer (DST): UTC-4 (EDT)
- ZIP code: 43938
- Area code: 740
- FIPS code: 39-54012
- GNIS feature ID: 2399450

New Alexandria is a village in Jefferson County, Ohio, United States. The population was 232 at the 2020 census. It is part of the Weirton–Steubenville metropolitan area.

== History ==
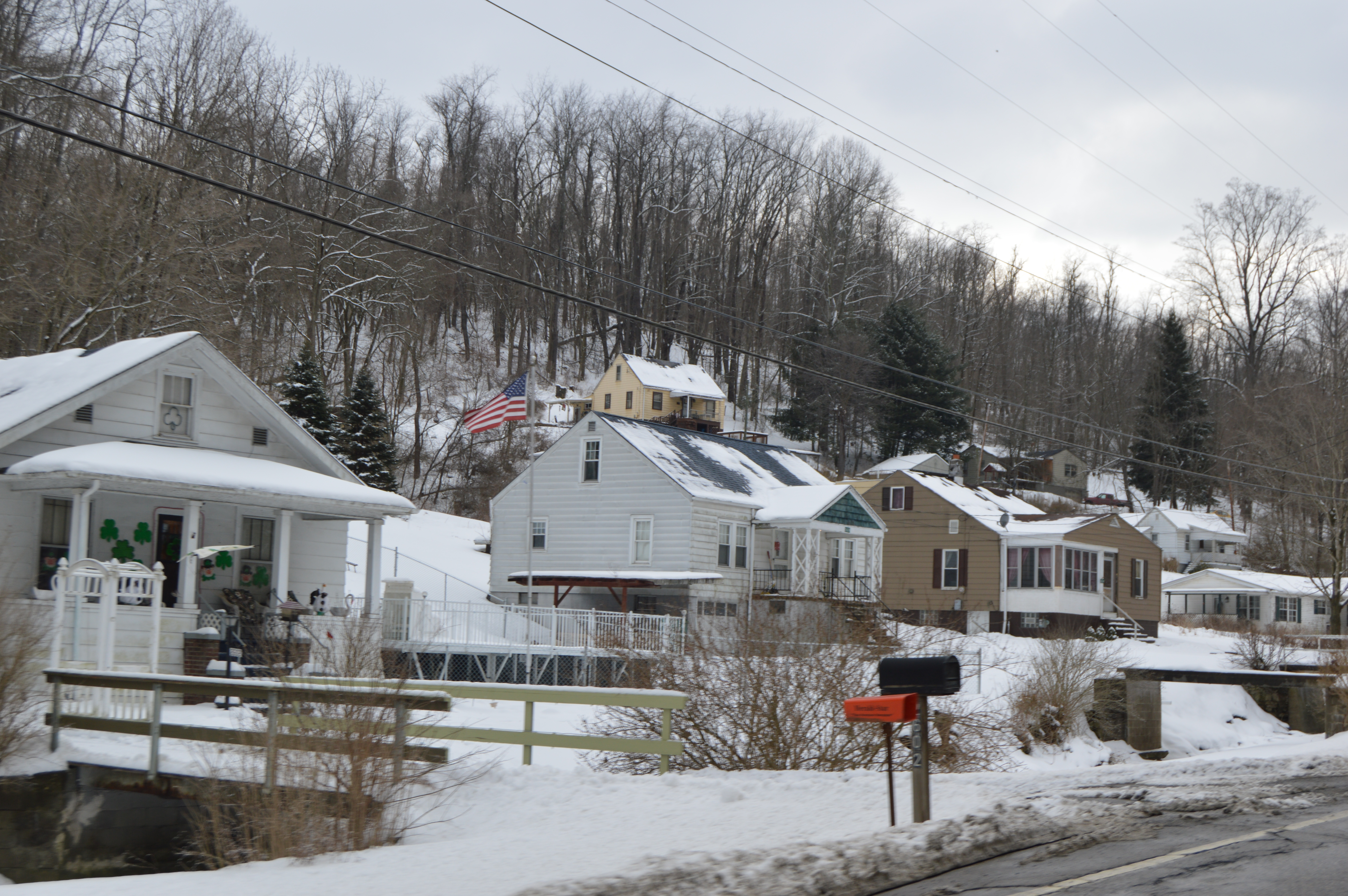
Houses on Ohio State Route 151

New Alexandria derives its name from the former proprietor, Alexander Smith, who laid out the town in 1831. Prior to this, the area was known as "Tempo" by the surrounding local community, derived from either a temperance hotel that was kept there by Matthew Thompson as far back as 1820, or the village Tempo, County Fermanagh, Ireland where Thompson grew up.

There was a small collection of houses prior to Smith laying out the village. Thomson also started the first store and was the first postmaster of the village. In 1831, Smith opened a hotel and store in the newly organized area. Being distant from any rail or water transportation the village grew at a slow rate, it did however have a fairly large area of local trade with the rural community surrounding it. The village was incorporated in 1871 and has been the home of several small businesses, churches, clubs, a cemetery, a post office, a community park, a school and a volunteer fire department over the years.

Confederate general John Hunt Morgan traveled through New Alexandria during the 1863 Morgan's Raid on his way to defeat at the Battle of Salineville in the American Civil War.

== Geography ==
New Alexandria is situated on the south side of Cross Creek township, Wells Township line making its southern boundary. According to the United States Census Bureau, the village has a total area of 0.37 square miles (0.96 km^{2}), all land.

== Demographics ==
Historical population
| Census | Pop. | Note | %± |
|---|---|---|---|
| 1850 | 198 | | — |
| 1860 | 228 | | 15.2% |
| 1870 | 167 | | −26.8% |
| 1880 | 175 | | 4.8% |
| 1890 | 122 | | −30.3% |
| 1900 | 148 | | 21.3% |
| 1910 | 185 | | 25.0% |
| 1920 | 141 | | −23.8% |
| 1930 | 241 | | 70.9% |
| 1940 | 328 | | 36.1% |
| 1950 | 383 | | 16.8% |
| 1960 | 396 | | 3.4% |
| 1970 | 425 | | 7.3% |
| 1980 | 410 | | −3.5% |
| 1990 | 257 | | −37.3% |
| 2000 | 222 | | −13.6% |
| 2010 | 272 | | 22.5% |
| 2020 | 232 | | −14.7% |
U.S. Decennial Census

=== 2010 census ===
As of the census of 2010, there were 272 people, 107 households, and 74 families living in the village. The population density was 735.1 inhabitants per square mile (283.8/km^{2}). There were 116 housing units at an average density of 313.5 per square mile (121.0/km^{2}). The racial makeup of the village was 97.1% White, 1.5% African American, and 1.5% from two or more races.

There were 107 households, of which 26.2% had children under the age of 18 living with them, 57.0% were married couples living together, 6.5% had a female householder with no husband present, 5.6% had a male householder with no wife present, and 30.8% were non-families. 22.4% of all households were made up of individuals, and 12.1% had someone living alone who was 65 years of age or older. The average household size was 2.54 and the average family size was 3.00.

The median age in the village was 45.7 years. 21% of residents were under the age of 18; 4% were between the ages of 18 and 24; 24.2% were from 25 to 44; 32% were from 45 to 64; and 18.8% were 65 years of age or older. The gender makeup of the village was 53.3% male and 46.7% female.

=== 2000 census ===
As of the census of 2000, there were 222 people, 90 households, and 70 families living in the village. The population density was 614.7 inhabitants per square mile (237.3/km^{2}). There were 98 housing units at an average density of 271.3 per square mile (104.7/km^{2}). The racial makeup of the village was 98.20% White, and 1.80% from two or more races.

There were 90 households, out of which 28.9% had children under the age of 18 living with them, 64.4% were married couples living together, 12.2% had a female householder with no husband present, and 22.2% were non-families. 20.0% of all households were made up of individuals, and 11.1% had someone living alone who was 65 years of age or older. The average household size was 2.47 and the average family size was 2.79.

In the village, the population was spread out, with 17.1% under the age of 18, 9.0% from 18 to 24, 23.9% from 25 to 44, 31.1% from 45 to 64, and 18.9% who were 65 years of age or older. The median age was 45 years. For every 100 females there were 88.1 males. For every 100 females age 18 and over, there were 82.2 males.

The median income for a household in the village was $31,250, and the median income for a family was $31,250. Males had a median income of $42,500 versus $18,750 for females. The per capita income for the village was $15,184. About 13.6% of families and 15.8% of the population were below the poverty line, including 23.8% of those under the age of eighteen and 11.4% of those 65 or over.

== Education ==
Public education for the village of New Alexandria is provided by the Buckeye Local School District.
