= Chandler, Ohio =

- Unincorporated community
- Location within Ohio
- Coordinates: 40°18′28″N 80°48′15″W
- Country: United States
- State: Ohio
- Counties: Jefferson
- Elevation: 1,020 ft (310 m)
- Time zone: UTC-5 (Eastern (EST))
  - Summer (DST): UTC-4 (EDT)
- ZIP code: 43910
- Area code: 740
- GNIS feature ID: 1060949

Chandler is an unincorporated community in Wayne Township, Jefferson County, Ohio, United States. It is located south of Bloomingdale at the intersection of Bloomingdale-Smithfield-Chandler Road and County Road 24.

The Chandler Post Office was established on April 16, 1921 and discontinued December 31, 1932. Mail service is now handled through the Bloomingdale branch. As of 1949, the Pittsburgh and West Virginia Railway was operating a freight terminal here.
