= Piney Fork, Ohio =

Unincorporated community in Ohio, U.S.

Coordinates: 40°15′17″N 80°49′37″W

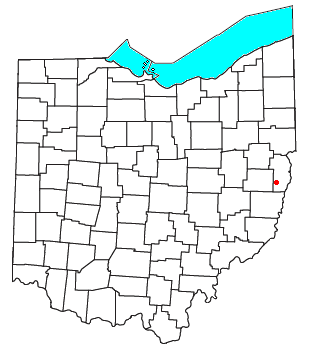
Location of Piney Fork, Ohio

Piney Fork is an unincorporated community in central Smithfield Township, Jefferson County, Ohio, United States.1063420 The stream of Piney Fork flows southeast past the community; it meets Short Creek in far western Warren Township, and Short Creek in turn meets the Ohio River at Rayland.

Piney Fork is part of the Weirton–Steubenville, WV-OH Metropolitan Statistical Area.

A Presbyterian church was built at Piney Fork in 1800. A post office called Piney Fork operated from 1902 to 2012.

Piney Fork used to be a thriving small town with a dentist, a doctor, a school, a few churches, and some bars until the coal mine shut down. Most people have moved on from Piney Fork because the businesses have left.

== Education ==
Public education in the community of Piney Fork is provided by the Buckeye Local School District.
