= Warrenton, Ohio =

Unincorporated community in Ohio, U.S.

Coordinates: 40°11′31″N 80°40′48″W

Warrenton is an unincorporated community in Jefferson County, in the U.S. state of Ohio.

== History ==
Warrenton was platted in 1805. A post office called Warrenton was established in 1806, and remained in operation until 1911.
