= Dunglen, Ohio =

Unincorporated community in Ohio, U.S.

Coordinates: 40°11′43″N 80°47′58″W

Dunglen is an unincorporated community in Jefferson County, in the U.S. state of Ohio.

== History ==
A post office called Dunglen was established in 1903. Dunglen was originally a mining community.
