= Panhandle, Ohio =

- Unincorporated community
- Location within Ohio
- Coordinates: 40°21′31″N 80°52′07″W
- Country: United States
- State: Ohio
- Counties: Jefferson
- Elevation: 997 ft (304 m)
- Time zone: UTC-5 (Eastern (EST))
  - Summer (DST): UTC-4 (EDT)
- ZIP code: 43910
- Area code: 740
- GNIS feature ID: 1062930

Panhandle is an unincorporated community in Wayne Township, Jefferson County, Ohio, United States. It is located northwest of Bloomingdale and just west of Unionport at the intersection of Carman Road and Township Road 201.

The Panhandle Post Office was established on August 16, 1911, and discontinued on October 15, 1923. Mail service is now handled through the Unionport branch.
