= Cross Creek Township, Ohio =

Township in Ohio, US

Cross Creek Township, Jefferson County, Ohio
- Township
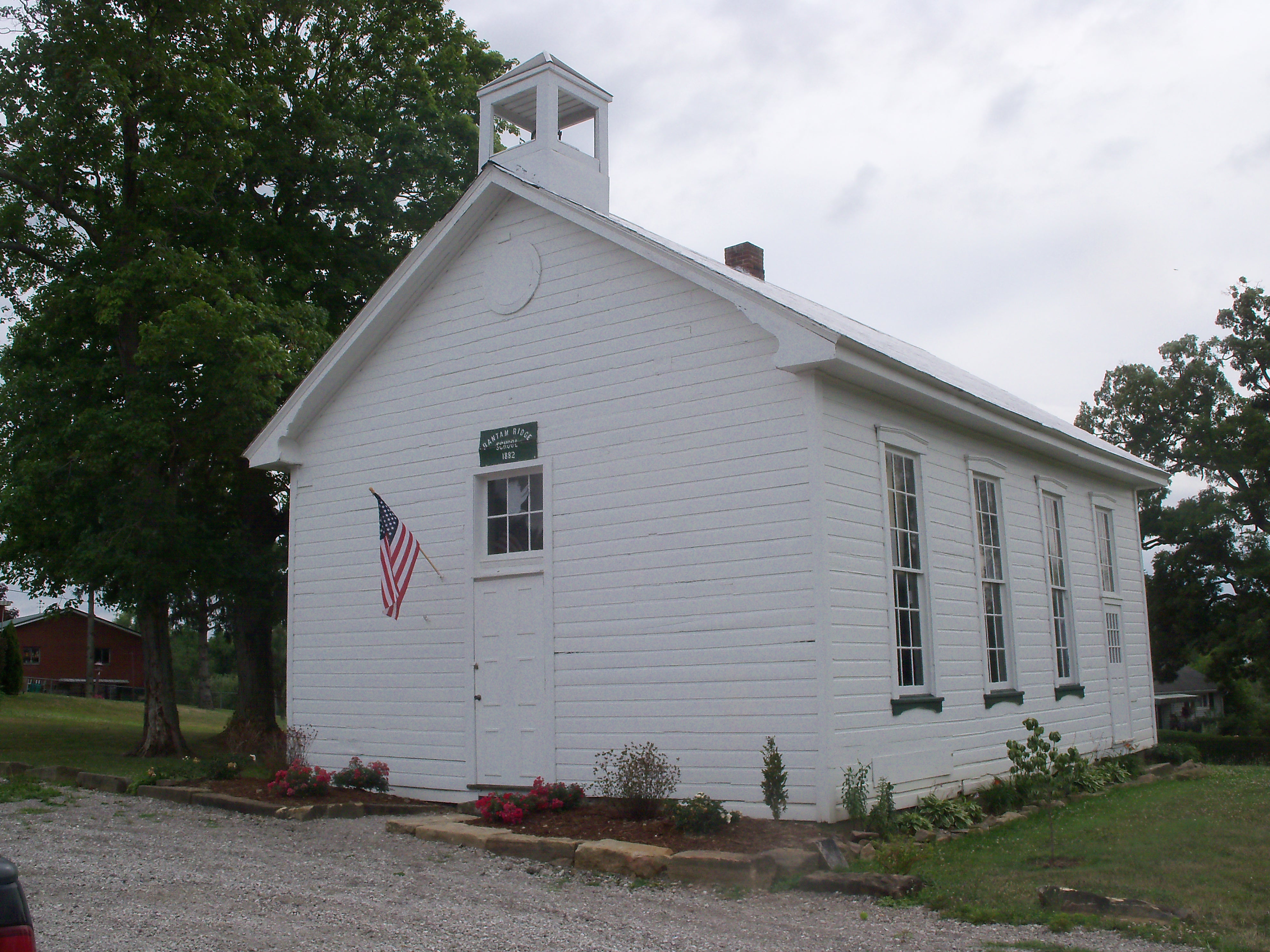
- Historic schoolhouse in Cross Creek Township

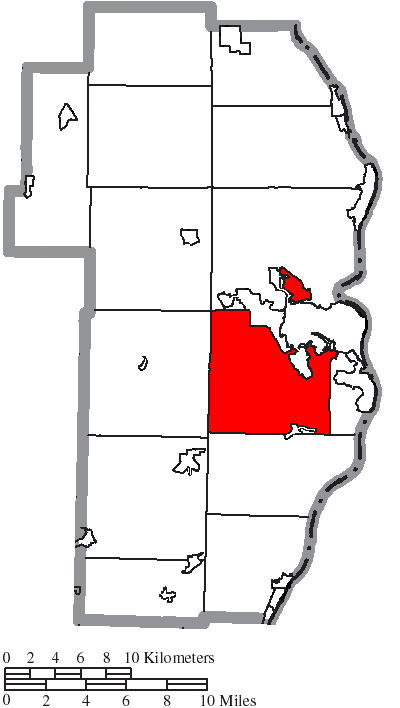
- Location of Cross Creek Township in Jefferson County
- Coordinates: 40°20′53″N 80°41′59″W
- Country: United States
- State: Ohio
- County: Jefferson

Area
  - Total: 32.6 sq mi (84.4 km^{2})
  - Land: 32.6 sq mi (84.4 km^{2})
  - Water: 0 sq mi (0.0 km^{2})
- Elevation: 1,145 ft (349 m)

Population (2020)
  - Total: 7,870
  - Density: 242/sq mi (93.2/km^{2})
- Time zone: UTC-5 (Eastern (EST))
  - Summer (DST): UTC-4 (EDT)
- FIPS code: 39-19484
- GNIS feature ID: 1086377

Cross Creek Township is one of the fourteen townships of Jefferson County, Ohio, United States. The 2020 census recorded 7,870 people in the township.

== Geography ==
Located in the central part of the county, it borders the following townships and city:

- Island Creek Township - north
- Salem Township - northwest corner
- Steubenville - northeast
- Steubenville Township - east
- Wayne Township - west
- Wells Township - south

Northeastern Cross Creek Township is occupied by parts of the city of Steubenville, the county seat of Jefferson County. Villages in the township include part of New Alexandria in the south and part of Wintersville in the north.

== Name and history ==
Cross Creek Township was founded in 1806.

It is the only Cross Creek Township statewide.

Cross Creek Township is named after the Cross Creek Watershed, which flows through western Washington County to the Ohio River in West Virginia.

== Government ==
The township is governed by a three-member board of trustees, who are elected in November of odd-numbered years to a four-year term beginning on the following January 1. Two are elected in the year after the presidential election and one is elected in the year before it. There is also an elected township fiscal officer, who serves a four-year term beginning on April 1 of the year after the election, which is held in November of the year before the presidential election. Vacancies in the fiscal officership or on the board of trustees are filled by the remaining trustees.
