= Fernwood, Ohio =

Unincorporated community in Ohio, U.S.

Coordinates: 40°20′03″N 80°42′27″W

Fernwood is an unincorporated community in Jefferson County, in the U.S. state of Ohio.

== History ==
A post office called Fernwood was established in 1883, and remained in operation until 1929. Besides the post office, Fernwood had a Methodist Episcopal Church.
