= Parlett, Ohio =

Community in Jefferson County, Ohio, US

- Unincorporated community
- Location within Ohio
- Coordinates: 40°18′27″N 80°51′46″W
- Country: United States
- State: Ohio
- Counties: Jefferson
- Elevation: 1,168 ft (356 m)
- Time zone: UTC-5 (Eastern (EST))
  - Summer (DST): UTC-4 (EDT)
- ZIP code: 43907
- Area code: 740
- GNIS feature ID: 1049062

Parlett is an unincorporated community in Wayne Township, Jefferson County, Ohio, United States. It is located southeast of Hopedale and just east of Cherry Valley at the intersection of Ohio State Route 151 and Township Road 142A.

== History ==
In 1909, a coal mine called the Wabash Mine was owned by the Wabash Coal Company of Cleveland, with 76 employees. By 1915, the mine had been renamed the Netta Mine and had transferred ownership to the Netta Coal Company, also of Cleveland, with 84 employees working. The Wabash Railroad maintained a station in Parlett for loading the coal. In 1921, there was a 300-short-ton (270 t) steam shovel operating at the mine that had "been there for a considerable time", owned by the Wayne Coal Company.

The Parlett Post Office was established on March 26, 1906, and discontinued on January 14, 1928. Mail service is now handled through the Cadiz branch.
