= Hammondsville, Ohio =

- Unincorporated community
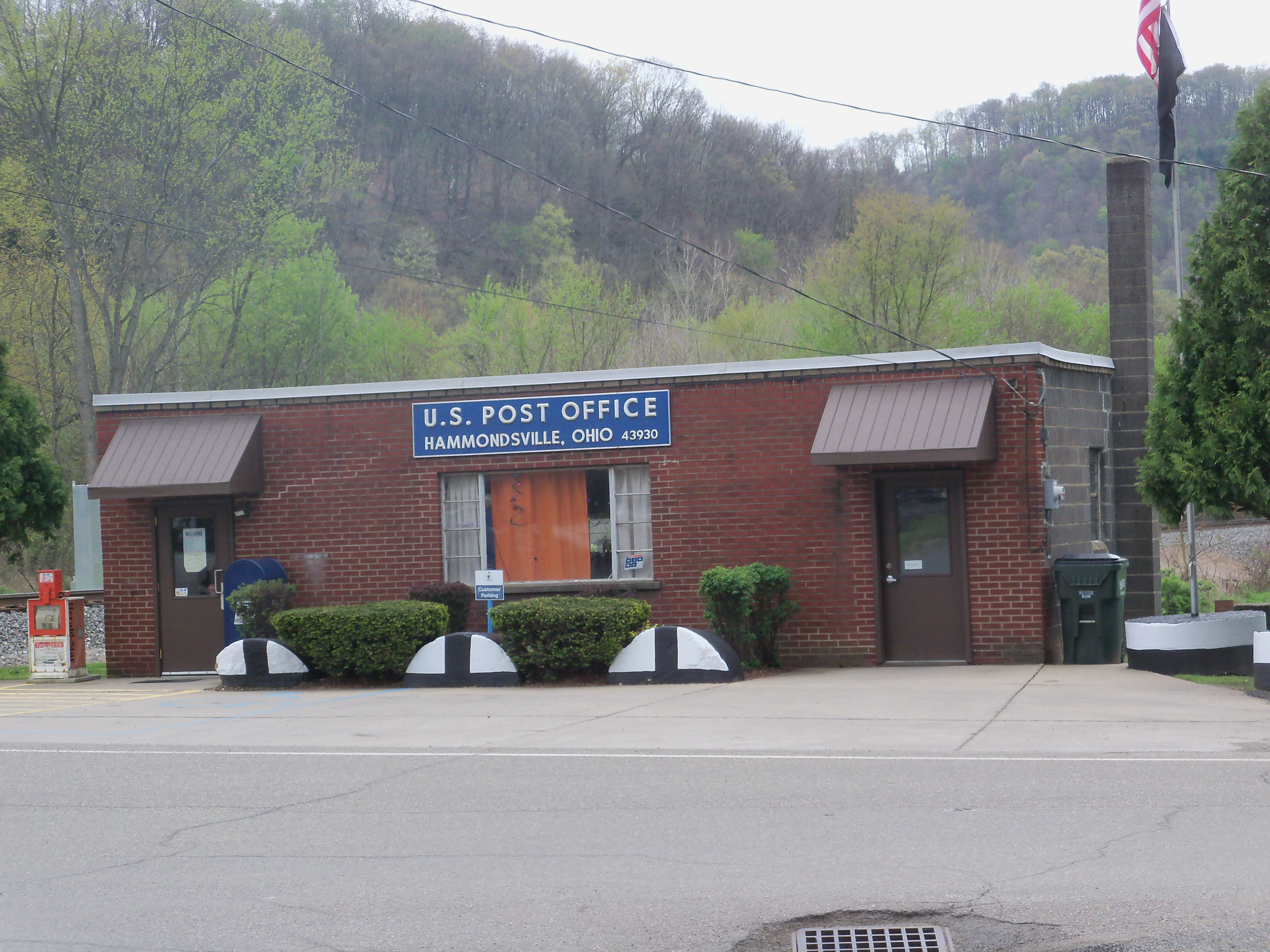
- Hammondsville Post Office on Ohio State Route 213

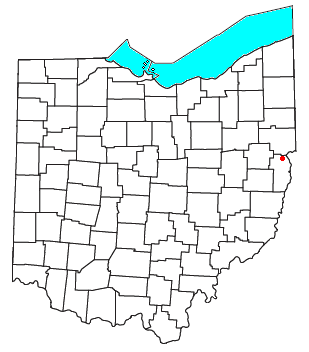
- Location of Hammondsville in the state of Ohio
- Country: United States
- State: Ohio
- County: Jefferson
- Townships: Saline
- Elevation: 689 ft (210 m)
- Time zone: UTC-5 (Eastern (EST))
  - Summer (DST): UTC-4 (EDT)
- ZIP code: 43930
- Area code: 740
- GNIS feature ID: 1064786

Hammondsville is an unincorporated community in central Saline Township, Jefferson County, Ohio, United States. It is part of the Weirton–Steubenville metropolitan area. It lies along Ohio State Route 213.

== History ==
Hammondsville was laid out in 1852 and named for Charles Hammond, the original owner of the town site. A post office has been in operation at Hammondsville since 1852. Hammondsville was originally a mining community and the Hammondsville Mining and Coal Company operated there.

== Education ==
Hammondsville is part of the Edison Local School District. Campuses serving the community include Stanton Elementary School (Preschool–Grade 8) and Edison High School (grades 9–12).

== Notable people ==
- Bevo Francis, basketball player, one of the most prolific scorers in college basketball history
