= Irondale, Ohio =

- Village
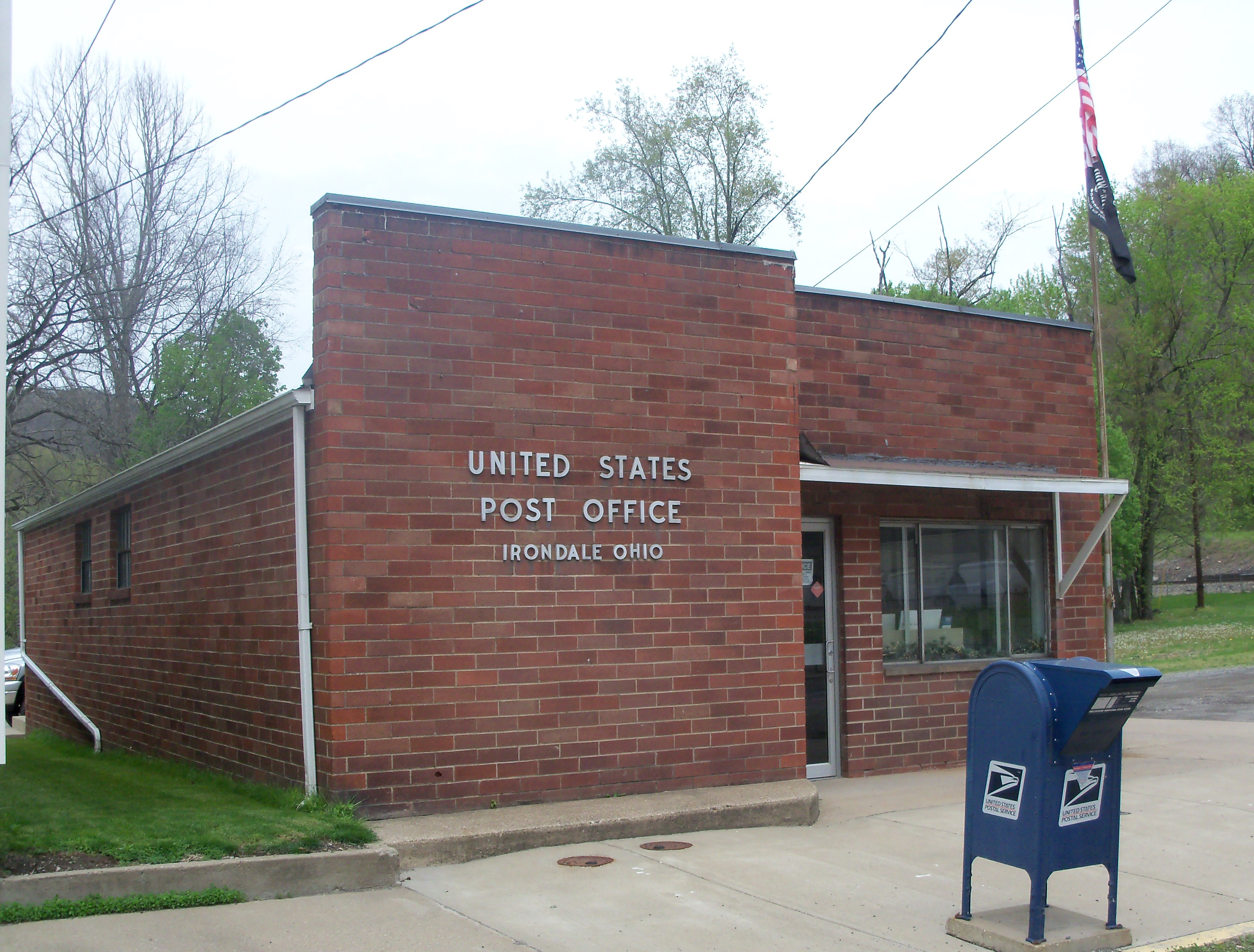
- Irondale Post Office sits near Yellow Creek

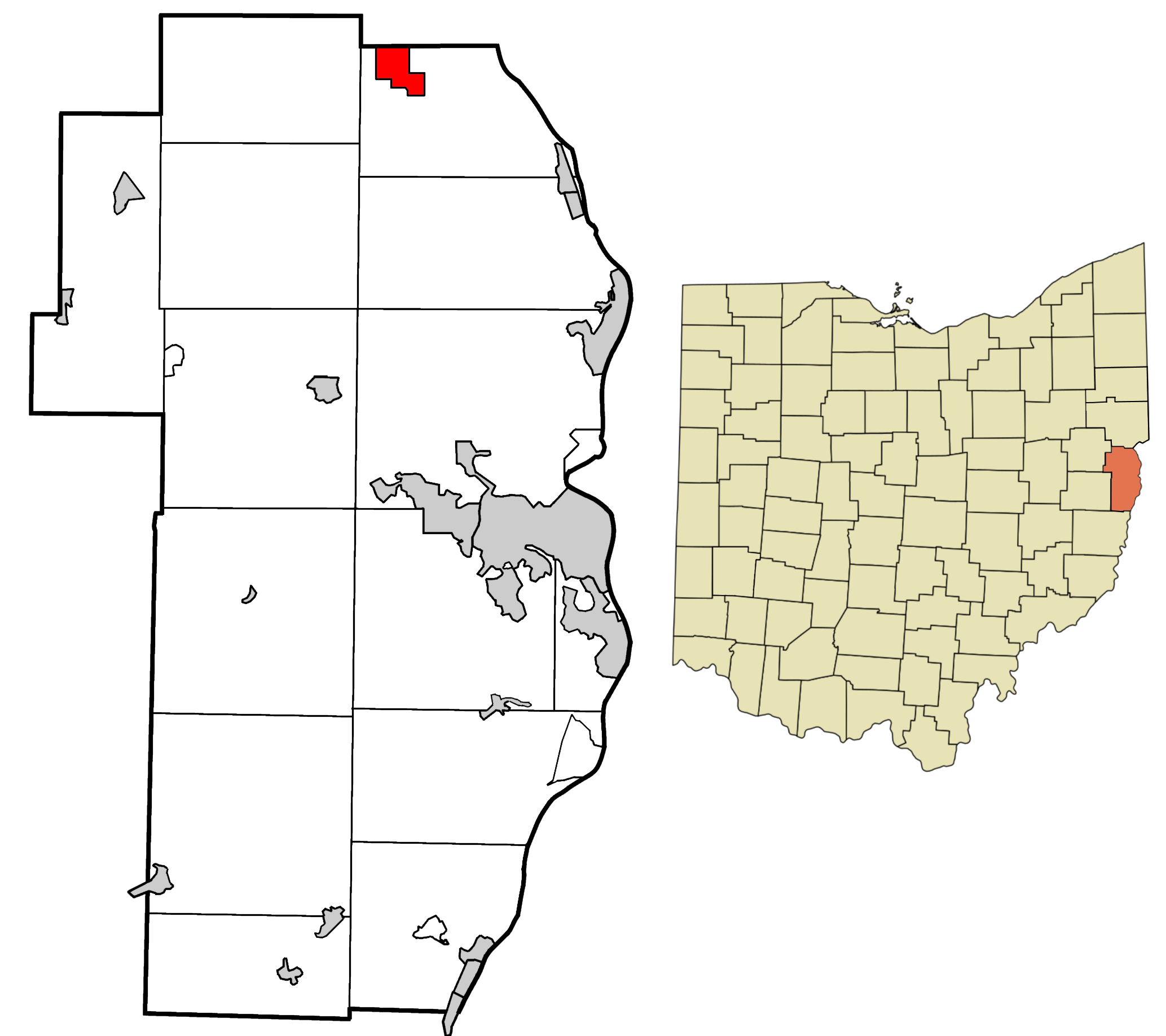
- Location of Irondale in Jefferson County, Ohio

- Location within Ohio Location within the United States
- Coordinates: 40°34′22″N 80°43′33″W
- Country: United States
- State: Ohio
- County: Jefferson
- Township: Saline

Area
  - Total: 1.47 sq mi (3.82 km^{2})
  - Land: 1.45 sq mi (3.75 km^{2})
  - Water: 0.027 sq mi (0.07 km^{2})
- Elevation: 719 ft (219 m)

Population (2020)
  - Total: 326
  - Density: 224.9/sq mi (86.85/km^{2})
- Time zone: UTC-5 (Eastern (EST))
  - Summer (DST): UTC-4 (EDT)
- ZIP code: 43932
- Area code: 330
- FIPS code: 39-37422
- GNIS feature ID: 2398274

Irondale is a village in Jefferson County, Ohio, United States. The population was 326 at the 2020 census. It is part of the Weirton–Steubenville metropolitan area.

== History ==
Irondale was originally known as Pottsdale, for Samuel Potts, who started a salt operation at Yellow Creek circa 1806. In 1869 Morgan & Hunter laid out the original plat of what was then called Hunterville which later was changed to Irondale after the discovery of iron ore and other minerals used in the manufacture of tin. Coal mining began at the settlement in 1861. A blast furnace was built later to supply iron to the tin mill which gave the town its new name, Irondale. The first commercially successful tin mill in the United States operated in Irondale in the 1880s.

== Geography ==
According to the United States Census Bureau, the village has a total area of 1.48 square miles (3.83 km^{2}), of which 1.45 square miles (3.76 km^{2}) is land and 0.03 square miles (0.08 km^{2}) is water.

== Demographics ==
Historical population
Census	Pop.	Note	%±
1870	751		—
1880	399		−46.9%
1890	694		73.9%
1950	775		—
1960	705		−9.0%
1970	602		−14.6%
1980	535		−11.1%
1990	382		−28.6%
2000	418		9.4%
2010	387		−7.4%
2020	326		−15.8%
U.S. Decennial Census

=== 2010 census ===
As of the census of 2010, there were 387 people, 142 households, and 104 families living in the village. The population density was 266.9 inhabitants per square mile (103.1/km^{2}). There were 165 housing units at an average density of 113.8 per square mile (43.9/km^{2}). The racial makeup of the village was 99.7% White and 0.3% African American.

There were 142 households, of which 37.3% had children under the age of 18 living with them, 51.4% were married couples living together, 14.8% had a female householder with no husband present, 7.0% had a male householder with no wife present, and 26.8% were non-families. 23.2% of all households were made up of individuals, and 7.7% had someone living alone who was 65 years of age or older. The average household size was 2.73 and the average family size was 3.19.

The median age in the village was 36.1 years. 28.4% of residents were under the age of 18; 7.1% were between the ages of 18 and 24; 26.1% were from 25 to 44; 26.9% were from 45 to 64; and 11.6% were 65 years of age or older. The gender makeup of the village was 53.0% male and 47.0% female.

=== 2000 census ===
As of the census of 2000, there were 418 people, 154 households, and 111 families living in the village. The population density was 298.5 inhabitants per square mile (115.3/km^{2}). There were 167 housing units at an average density of 119.2 per square mile (46.0/km^{2}). The racial makeup of the village was 95.69% White, 2.87% African American, 0.48% Native American, 0.24% Asian, 0.24% from other races, and 0.48% from two or more races. Hispanic or Latino of any race were 1.20% of the population.

There were 154 households, out of which 39.0% had children under the age of 18 living with them, 55.8% were married couples living together, 9.7% had a female householder with no husband present, and 27.9% were non-families. 24.7% of all households were made up of individuals, and 13.6% had someone living alone who was 65 years of age or older. The average household size was 2.71 and the average family size was 3.24.

In the village, the population was spread out, with 28.9% under the age of 18, 9.6% from 18 to 24, 28.9% from 25 to 44, 17.7% from 45 to 64, and 14.8% who were 65 years of age or older. The median age was 35 years. For every 100 females there were 104.9 males. For every 100 females age 18 and over, there were 99.3 males.

The median income for a household in the village was $27,344, and the median income for a family was $30,469. Males had a median income of $25,417 versus $26,250 for females. The per capita income for the village was $12,147. About 16.2% of families and 20.5% of the population were below the poverty line, including 26.5% of those under age 18 and 8.7% of those age 65 or over.

== Education ==
Public education in the village of Irondale is provided by the Edison Local School District. Campuses serving the village include Stanton Elementary School (Preschool-Grade 8) and Edison High School (Grades 9-12).
