= Jefferson County, Ohio =

County in Ohio, United States

- County
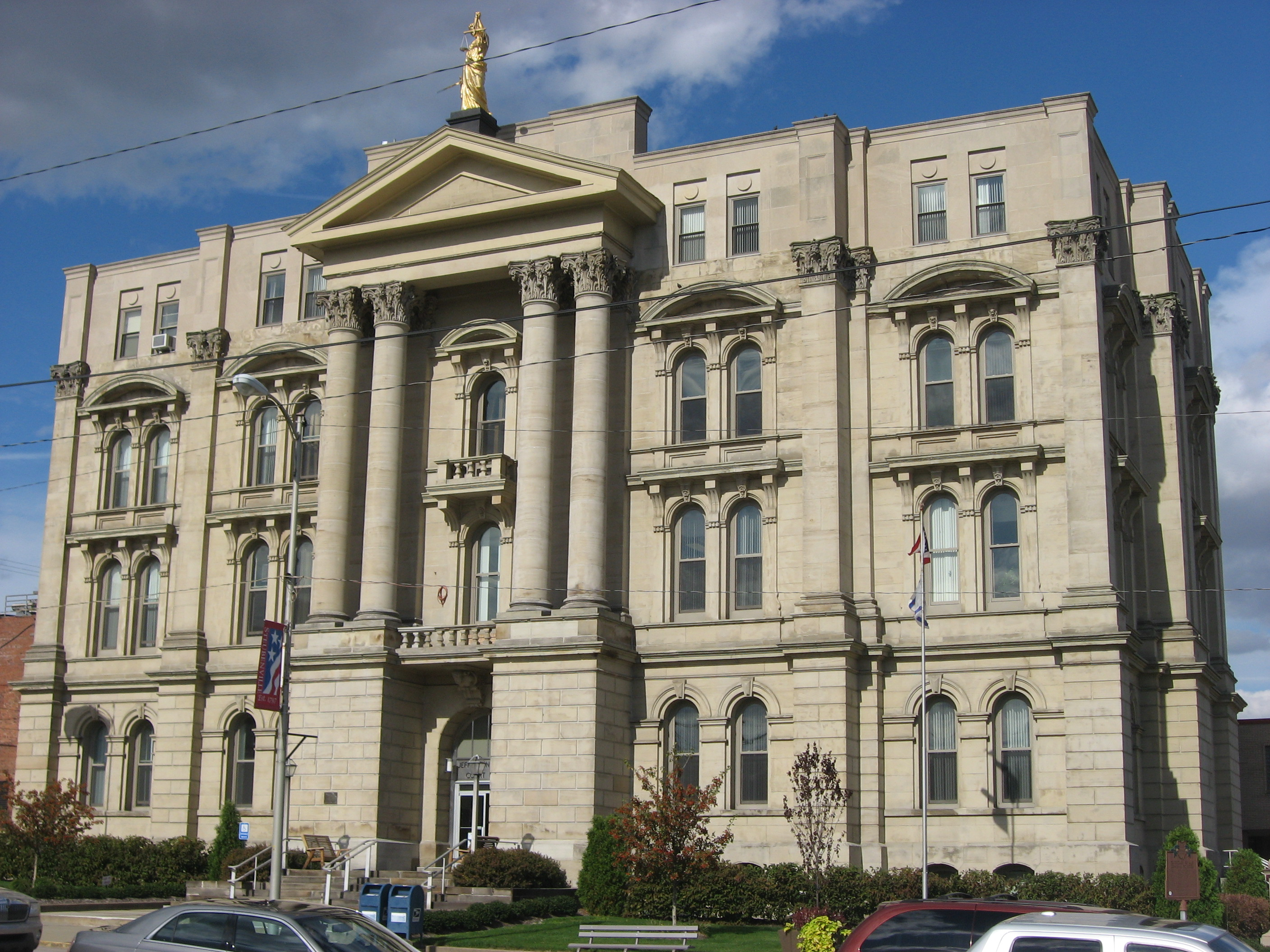
- Jefferson County Courthouse

- Flag Seal

- Location within the U.S. state of Ohio
- Coordinates: 40°23′N 80°46′W
- Country: United States
- State: Ohio
- Founded: July 29, 1797
- Named for: Thomas Jefferson
- Seat: Steubenville
- Largest city: Steubenville

Area
  - Total: 411 sq mi (1,060 km^{2})
  - Land: 408 sq mi (1,060 km^{2})
  - Water: 2.6 sq mi (6.7 km^{2}) 0.6%

Population (2020)
  - Total: 65,249
  - Estimate (2025): 63,597 ▼
  - Density: 160/sq mi (62/km^{2})
- Time zone: UTC−5 (Eastern)
  - Summer (DST): UTC−4 (EDT)
- Congressional district: 6th
- Website: jeffersoncountyoh.com

Jefferson County is located in the U.S. state of Ohio. As of the 2020 census, the population was 65,249. Its county seat and largest city is Steubenville. The county is named for U.S. Founding Father Thomas Jefferson, who was vice president at the time of its creation. Jefferson County is part of the Weirton–Steubenville metropolitan area, which is also included in the Pittsburgh–New Castle–Weirton combined statistical area.

== History ==
Jefferson County was organized on July 29, 1797, by proclamation of Governor Arthur St. Clair, six years before Ohio was granted statehood. Its boundaries were originally quite large, including all of northeastern Ohio east of the Cuyahoga River, but it was divided and redrawn several times before assuming its present-day boundaries in 1833, after the formation of neighboring Carroll County.

In 1786, the United States built Fort Steuben to protect the government surveyors mapping the land west of the Ohio River. When the surveyors completed their task a few years later, the fort was abandoned. In the meantime, settlers had built homes around the fort; they named their settlement La Belle. When the county was created in 1797, La Belle was selected as the County seat. The town was subsequently renamed Steubenville, in honor of the abandoned fort.

During the first half of the 19th century, Steubenville was primarily a port town, and the rest of the county consisted of small villages and farms. However, in 1856, Frazier, Kilgore and Company erected a rolling mill (the forerunner of steel mills) and the Steubenville Coal and Mining Company sank a coal shaft, resulting in Jefferson County becoming one of the leading centers of the new Industrial Revolution.

== Geography ==
According to the U.S. Census Bureau, the county has a total area of 411 square miles (1,060 km^{2}), of which 408 square miles (1,060 km^{2}) is land and 2.6 square miles (6.7 km^{2}) (0.6%) is water.

=== Adjacent counties ===
- Columbiana County (north)
- Hancock County, West Virginia (northeast)
- Brooke County, West Virginia (east)
- Ohio County, West Virginia (southeast)
- Belmont County (south)
- Harrison County (southwest)
- Carroll County (northwest)

== Demographics ==
Historical population
Census	Pop.	Note	%±
1800	8,766		—
1810	17,260		96.9%
1820	18,531		7.4%
1830	22,489		21.4%
1840	25,030		11.3%
1850	29,133		16.4%
1860	26,115		−10.4%
1870	29,188		11.8%
1880	33,018		13.1%
1890	39,415		19.4%
1900	44,357		12.5%
1910	65,423		47.5%
1920	77,580		18.6%
1930	88,307		13.8%
1940	98,129		11.1%
1950	96,495		−1.7%
1960	99,201		2.8%
1970	96,193		−3.0%
1980	91,564		−4.8%
1990	80,298		−12.3%
2000	73,894		−8.0%
2010	69,709		−5.7%
2020	65,249		−6.4%
2025 (est.)	63,597	▼	−2.5%
U.S. Decennial Census; 1790–1960 1900–1990; 1990–2000 2020

=== 2020 census ===
As of the 2020 census, the county had a population of 65,249, a median age of 44.6 years, 19.4% of residents under the age of 18, and 22.1% of residents 65 years of age or older. For every 100 females there were 94.8 males, and for every 100 females age 18 and over there were 92.4 males age 18 and over.

The racial makeup of the county was 87.3% White, 5.7% Black or African American, 0.2% American Indian and Alaska Native, 0.5% Asian, 0.1% Native Hawaiian and Pacific Islander, 0.7% from some other race, and 5.6% from two or more races. Hispanic or Latino residents of any race comprised 1.8% of the population.

60.7% of residents lived in urban areas, while 39.3% lived in rural areas.

There were 27,464 households in the county, of which 24.8% had children under the age of 18 living in them. Of all households, 42.7% were married-couple households, 20.3% were households with a male householder and no spouse or partner present, and 29.1% were households with a female householder and no spouse or partner present. About 32.3% of all households were made up of individuals and 15.3% had someone living alone who was 65 years of age or older.

There were 31,125 housing units, of which 11.8% were vacant. Among occupied housing units, 70.1% were owner-occupied and 29.9% were renter-occupied. The homeowner vacancy rate was 1.6% and the rental vacancy rate was 9.6%.

=== Racial and ethnic composition ===
Jefferson County, Ohio – Racial and ethnic composition Note: the US Census treats Hispanic/Latino as an ethnic category. This table excludes Latinos from the racial categories and assigns them to a separate category. Hispanics/Latinos may be of any race.
Race / ethnicity (NH = Non-Hispanic)	Pop 1980	Pop 1990	Pop 2000	Pop 2010	Pop 2020	% 1980	% 1990	% 2000	% 2010	% 2020
White alone (NH)	85,557	74,941	68,049	63,519	56,545	93.44%	93.33%	92.09%	91.12%	86.66%
Black or African American alone (NH)	5,039	4,484	4,192	3,856	3,619	5.50%	5.58%	5.67%	5.53%	5.55%
Native American or Alaska Native alone (NH)	114	156	135	88	109	0.12%	0.19%	0.18%	0.13%	0.17%
Asian alone (NH)	236	252	245	284	338	0.26%	0.31%	0.33%	0.41%	0.52%
Native Hawaiian or Pacific Islander alone (NH)	x	x	13	8	29	x	x	0.02%	0.01%	0.04%
Other race alone (NH)	128	39	88	66	244	0.14%	0.05%	0.12%	0.09%	0.37%
Mixed race or Multiracial (NH)	x	x	713	1,115	3,206	x	x	0.96%	1.60%	4.91%
Hispanic or Latino (any race)	490	426	459	773	1,159	0.54%	0.53%	0.62%	1.11%	1.78%
Total	91,564	80,298	73,894	69,709	65,249	100.00%	100.00%	100.00%	100.00%	100.00%

=== 2010 census ===
As of the 2010 United States census, there were 69,709 people, 29,109 households, and 18,713 families living in the county. The population density was 170.7 inhabitants per square mile (65.9/km^{2}). There were 32,826 housing units at an average density of 80.4 units per square mile (31.0 units/km^{2}). The racial makeup of the county was 91.9% white, 5.6% black or African American, 0.4% Asian, 0.1% American Indian, 0.2% from other races, and 1.7% from two or more races. Those of Hispanic or Latino origin made up 1.1% of the population. In terms of ancestry, 20.0% were German, 17.1% were Irish, 12.9% were Italian, 9.1% were English, 8.3% were Polish, and 4.6% were American.

Of the 29,109 households, 26.4% had children under the age of 18 living with them, 47.0% were married couples living together, 12.4% had a female householder with no husband present, 35.7% were non-families, and 30.5% of all households were made up of individuals. The average household size was 2.32 and the average family size was 2.86. The median age was 43.9 years.

The median income for a household in the county was $37,527 and the median income for a family was $47,901. Males had a median income of $43,601 versus $27,965 for females. The per capita income for the county was $20,470. About 12.4% of families and 17.7% of the population were below the poverty line, including 29.5% of those under age 18 and 7.7% of those age 65 or over.

=== 2000 census ===
As of the census of 2000, there were 73,894 people, 30,417 households, and 20,592 families living in the county. The population density was 180 inhabitants per square mile (69/km^{2}). There were 33,291 housing units at an average density of 81 units per square mile (31/km^{2}). The racial makeup of the county was 92.49% White, 5.68% Black or African American, 0.20% Native American, 0.33% Asian, 0.02% Pacific Islander, 0.25% from other races, and 1.03% from two or more races. 0.62% of the population were Hispanic or Latino of any race. 96.5% spoke English, 1.1% Spanish and 1.0% Italian as their first language.

There were 30,417 households, out of which 26.70% had children under the age of 18 living with them, 52.30% were married couples living together, 11.60% had a female householder with no husband present, and 32.30% were non-families. 28.50% of all households were made up of individuals, and 14.40% had someone living alone who was 65 years of age or older. The average household size was 2.36 and the average family size was 2.88.

In the county, the population was spread out, with 21.40% under the age of 18, 8.50% from 18 to 24, 25.60% from 25 to 44, 25.90% from 45 to 64, and 18.60% who were 65 years of age or older. The median age was 42 years. For every 100 females there were 91.20 males. For every 100 females age 18 and over, there were 87.50 males.

The median income for a household in the county was $30,853, and the median income for a family was $38,807. Males had a median income of $35,785 versus $20,375 for females. The per capita income for the county was $16,476. About 11.40% of families and 15.10% of the population were below the poverty line, including 22.30% of those under age 18 and 8.90% of those age 65 or over.

== Government and politics ==
Ohio law defines a structure for county government. Jefferson County has three-member board of county commissioners, a sheriff, coroner, auditor, treasurer, clerk of the court of common pleas prosecutor, engineer, and recorder. Jefferson County is represented as part of Ohio's 96th state house district and Ohio's 30th senatorial district. It is also included in the Ohio Seventh District Court of Appeals. Federally, it is part of Ohio's 6th congressional district.

Like many Appalachian counties, Jefferson County was a Democratic Party stronghold in the 20th century. However, since the turn of the 21st century, it has become much more competitive and even moved towards the Republican Party during the Democratic years of 2008 and 2012. In 2012, Mitt Romney became the first Republican candidate to win the county since it voted for Richard Nixon in the landslide 1972 presidential election. The county voted for Donald Trump by large margins in 2016, 2020, and 2024.

United States presidential election results for Jefferson County, Ohio
Year	Republican		Democratic		Third party(ies)	
Year	No.	%	No.	%	No.	%
1856	2,424	51.86%	1,991	42.60%	259	5.54%
1860	2,682	57.96%	1,163	25.14%	782	16.90%
1864	3,407	66.32%	1,730	33.68%	0	0.00%
1868	3,394	61.59%	2,117	38.41%	0	0.00%
1872	3,776	63.78%	2,102	35.51%	42	0.71%
1876	4,067	57.84%	2,922	41.56%	42	0.60%
1880	4,434	59.41%	2,945	39.46%	85	1.14%
1884	4,834	58.09%	3,283	39.45%	204	2.45%
1888	5,106	58.08%	3,293	37.46%	392	4.46%
1892	4,793	53.28%	3,493	38.83%	710	7.89%
1896	6,185	60.61%	3,824	37.48%	195	1.91%
1900	6,470	62.25%	3,575	34.40%	348	3.35%
1904	7,337	69.11%	2,600	24.49%	680	6.40%
1908	7,310	57.21%	4,882	38.21%	585	4.58%
1912	4,777	41.85%	3,171	27.78%	3,467	30.37%
1916	6,658	53.19%	5,250	41.94%	609	4.87%
1920	13,038	59.76%	8,064	36.96%	714	3.27%
1924	14,929	67.97%	3,840	17.48%	3,194	14.54%
1928	19,175	68.09%	8,711	30.93%	275	0.98%
1932	14,179	44.95%	16,066	50.93%	1,299	4.12%
1936	13,044	31.87%	27,472	67.11%	419	1.02%
1940	16,578	35.97%	29,514	64.03%	0	0.00%
1944	15,496	38.43%	24,827	61.57%	0	0.00%
1948	14,230	37.05%	23,725	61.77%	454	1.18%
1952	19,569	41.58%	27,499	58.42%	0	0.00%
1956	22,162	50.52%	21,703	49.48%	0	0.00%
1960	21,186	44.01%	26,955	55.99%	0	0.00%
1964	11,784	26.29%	33,039	73.71%	0	0.00%
1968	12,949	33.53%	21,917	56.76%	3,749	9.71%
1972	21,531	56.25%	16,198	42.32%	545	1.42%
1976	14,839	39.23%	22,318	59.00%	668	1.77%
1980	15,777	40.99%	20,382	52.95%	2,332	6.06%
1984	17,105	42.47%	22,832	56.69%	340	0.84%
1988	14,141	38.73%	22,095	60.52%	273	0.75%
1992	10,764	27.74%	20,978	54.07%	7,056	18.19%
1996	10,212	29.49%	19,402	56.04%	5,009	14.47%
2000	15,038	43.42%	17,488	50.49%	2,110	6.09%
2004	17,185	47.25%	19,024	52.30%	163	0.45%
2008	17,559	48.68%	17,635	48.89%	877	2.43%
2012	17,034	51.34%	15,385	46.37%	758	2.28%
2016	21,117	65.15%	9,675	29.85%	1,619	5.00%
2020	22,828	68.30%	10,018	29.98%	575	1.72%
2024	22,317	71.03%	8,592	27.35%	508	1.62%

United States Senate election results for Jefferson County, Ohio
Year	Republican		Democratic		Third party(ies)	
Year	No.	%	No.	%	No.	%
2024	19,795	64.25%	9,819	31.87%	1,196	3.88%
2026	13,049	59.12%	7,680	34.80%	1,343	6.08%

== Transportation ==
Commercial air service is available at nearby Pittsburgh International Airport to the east via U.S. Route 22. The county is served by two general aviation fields, the Jefferson County Airpark and the Eddie Dew Memorial Airpark. Ohio Route 7 is the main north–south highway through the county.

=== Major highways ===
- US 22
- US 250
- SR 7
- SR 43
- SR 150
- SR 151
- SR 152
- SR 164
- SR 213
- SR 646
- SR 647

== Education ==
=== Colleges and universities ===
- Franciscan University of Steubenville
- Youngstown State University Steubenville

=== Community, junior, and technical colleges ===
- Trinity Health System School of Nursing

=== Public school districts ===
- Buckeye Local School District
- Edison Local School District
- Indian Creek Local School District
- Steubenville City School District
- Toronto City School District

==== High schools ====
- Buckeye Local High School
- Catholic Central High School
- Edison High School
- Indian Creek High School
- Jefferson County Christian School
- Steubenville High School
- Toronto High School

== Communities ==
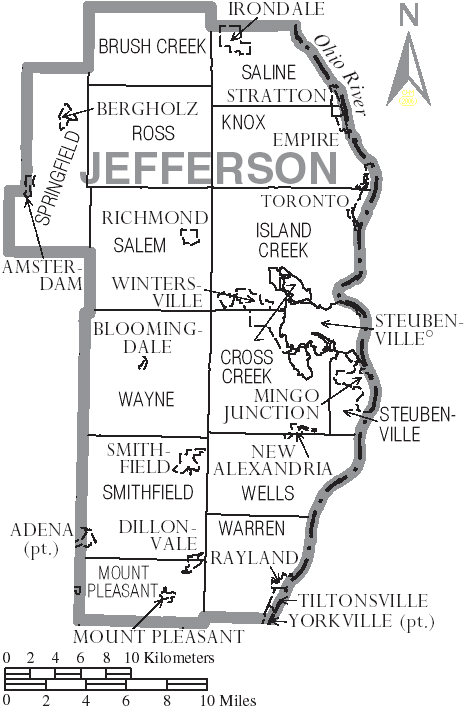
Map of Jefferson County, Ohio with Municipal and Township Labels

=== Cities ===
- Steubenville (county seat)
- Toronto

=== Villages ===
- Adena
- Amsterdam
- Bergholz
- Bloomingdale
- Dillonvale
- Empire
- Irondale
- Mingo Junction
- Mount Pleasant
- New Alexandria
- Rayland
- Richmond
- Stratton
- Tiltonsville
- Wintersville
- Yorkville

=== Townships ===
- Brush Creek
- Cross Creek
- Island Creek
- Knox
- Mount Pleasant
- Ross
- Salem
- Saline
- Smithfield
- Springfield
- Steubenville
- Warren
- Wayne
- Wells

=== Census-designated places ===
- Brilliant
- Connorville
- East Springfield
- Pottery Addition

=== Unincorporated communities ===
- Alikanna
- Altamont
- Annapolis
- Belvedere
- Bradley
- Broadacre
- Calumet
- Chandler
- Circle Green
- Costonia
- Cream City
- Deandale
- Deyarmonville
- Dunglen
- Emerson
- Fairplay
- Fernwood
- Georges Run
- Gould
- Grandview Heights
- Greentown
- Hammondsville
- Herrick
- Holt
- Hopewell
- Jackson Heights
- Knoxville
- McConnelsville
- McIntyre
- Middleburg
- Monroeville
- New Somerset
- Newell
- Olszeski Town
- Osage
- Panhandle
- Parlett
- Piney Fork
- Port Homer
- Pravo
- Ramsey
- Reeds Mill
- Robyville
- Rush Run
- Shady Glen
- Smithfield (former village)
- Unionport
- Warrenton
- Wolf Run
- Weems
- Yellow Creek
- York

=== Historical community ===
Carpenter's Fort, or Carpenter's Station as it was sometimes called, was established in the summer of 1781 when John Carpenter built a fortified house above the mouth of Short Creek on the Ohio side of the Ohio River in Coshocton County, but now in Jefferson County, Ohio, near Rayland, Ohio.

=== Population ranking ===
The population ranking of the following table is based on the 2010 census of Jefferson County.

* majority of municipality in Harrison County
** minority of municipality in Belmont County
† county seat

Rank	City/Town/etc.	Population (2010 Census)	Municipal type
1	† Steubenville	18,659	City
2	Toronto	5,091	City
3	Wintersville	3,924	Village
4	Mingo Junction	3,454	Village
5	Tiltonsville	1,372	Village
6	Yorkville**	1,079	Village
7	Smithfield	869	Village
8	Adena*	759	Village
9	Dillonvale	665	Village
10	Bergholz	664	Village
11	Amsterdam	511	Village
12	Mount Pleasant	478	Village
13	Richmond	481	Village
14	Rayland	417	Village
15	Irondale	387	Village
16	Empire	299	Village
17	Stratton	294	Village
18	Pottery Addition	293	CDP
19	New Alexandria	272	Village
20	Bloomingdale	202	Village

== See also ==
- National Register of Historic Places listings in Jefferson County, Ohio
