= Calumet, Ohio =

- Unincorporated community
- Location within Ohio
- Coordinates: 40°28′55″N 80°36′24″W
- Country: United States
- State: Ohio
- Counties: Jefferson
- Elevation: 692 ft (211 m)
- Time zone: UTC-5 (Eastern (EST))
  - Summer (DST): UTC-4 (EDT)
- ZIP code: 43964
- Area code: 740
- GNIS feature ID: 1065548

Calumet (previously also known as Elliotsville) is an unincorporated community in Knox Township, Jefferson County, Ohio, United States. It is located just north of Toronto between Ohio State Route 7 and the Ohio River. North 4th Street and North River Avenue both run continuously from Toronto to Calumet.

== History ==
Prior to about 1880, the community was known as Elliotsville. Calumet Station was a stop on the Cleveland and Pittsburgh Railroad as of 1910. The Calumet Post Office was established on January 20, 1873. The Name was changed to Elliotsville Post Office on January 13, 1874, and back to Calumet Post Office on July 9, 1874. The branch was ultimately discontinued on April 30, 1908. A sewer pipe and fire clay factory was built here in November 1870, with extensive upgrades in 1894. Originally operating as the Calumet Sewer Pipe Firebrick and Terracotta Works until 1878, then as the Calumet Fire Clay Company until 1900, becoming the American Sewer Pipe Company and later part of the National Fireproofing Company in 1907. In 1880, it was one of the largest factories of its kind along the Ohio River, producing a large variety of products and making about $90,000 annually. Besides the railroad buildings and the factory, there was a general store (owned by then Postmaster James L. Elliot) and a number of houses.
