= Saline Township, Jefferson County, Ohio =

Township in Ohio, US

- Township
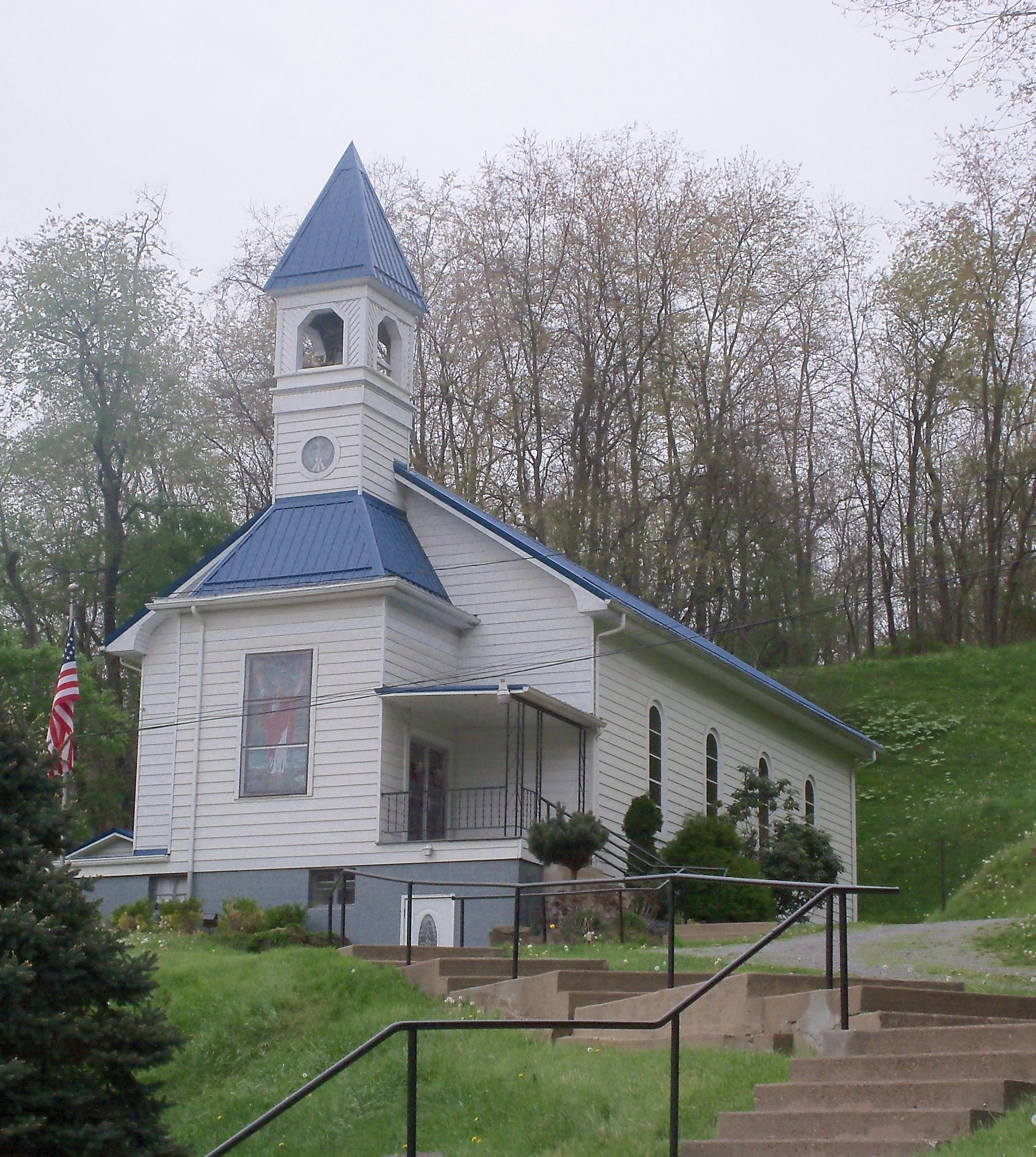
- United Methodist Church in Hammondsville

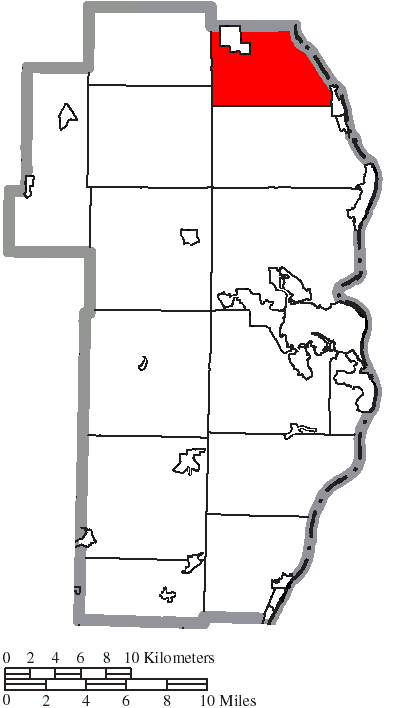
- Location of Saline Township in Jefferson County
- Coordinates: 40°33′22″N 80°42′19″W
- Country: United States
- State: Ohio
- County: Jefferson

Area
  - Total: 21.5 sq mi (55.7 km^{2})
  - Land: 21.1 sq mi (54.6 km^{2})
  - Water: 0.42 sq mi (1.1 km^{2})
- Elevation: 686 ft (209 m)

Population (2020)
  - Total: 1,171
  - Density: 55.5/sq mi (21.4/km^{2})
- Time zone: UTC-5 (Eastern (EST))
  - Summer (DST): UTC-4 (EDT)
- FIPS code: 39-70086
- GNIS feature ID: 1086383

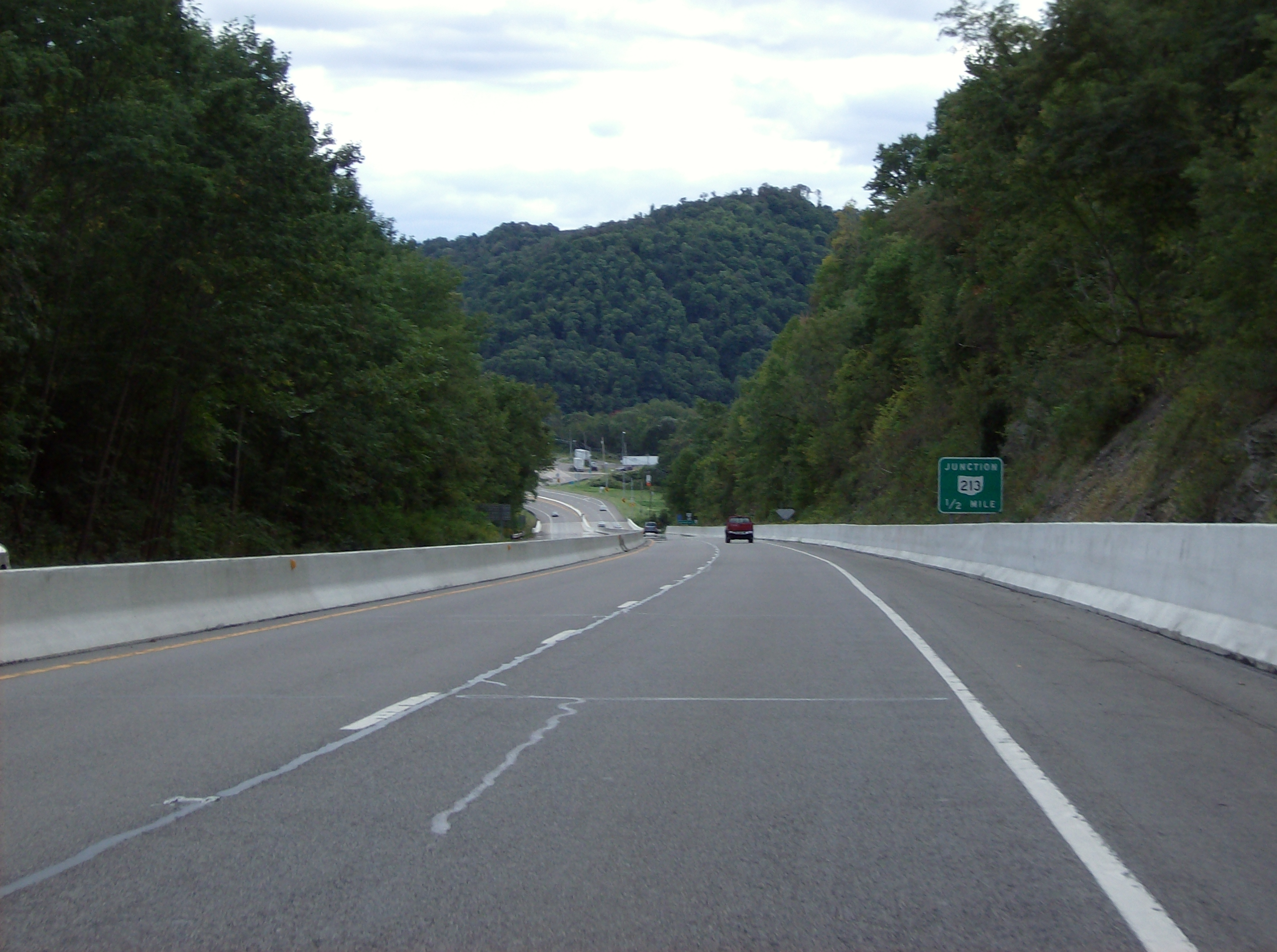
State Route 7 travels through Saline Township

Saline Township is one of the fourteen townships of Jefferson County, Ohio, United States. The 2020 census found 1,171 people in the township.

== Geography ==
Located in the northeastern corner of the county along the Ohio River, it borders the following townships:

- Yellow Creek Township, Columbiana County - north
- Knox Township - south
- Ross Township - southwest
- Brush Creek Township - northwest

Hancock County, West Virginia lies across the Ohio River to the east.

Two villages are located in Saline Township: Irondale in the northwest and part of Stratton in the southeast along the Ohio River. In addition, the unincorporated community of Hammondsville lies in the center of the township.

== Name and history ==
The name of Saline Township is derived from the salinity of its salt wells.

It is the only Saline Township statewide.

== Government ==
The township is governed by a three-member board of trustees, who are elected in November of odd-numbered years to a four-year term beginning on the following January 1. Two are elected in the year after the presidential election and one is elected in the year before it. There is also an elected township fiscal officer, who serves a four-year term beginning on April 1 of the year after the election, which is held in November of the year before the presidential election. Vacancies in the fiscal officership or on the board of trustees are filled by the remaining trustees.
