= Cannabis in Ohio =

Ohio's Cannabis Universal Symbol

Cannabis in Ohio is legal for recreational use. Issue 2, a ballot measure to legalize recreational use, passed by a 57–43 margin on November 7, 2023. Possession and personal cultivation of cannabis became legal on December 7, 2023. The first licensed sales started on August 6, 2024. Prior to legalization, Ohio decriminalized possession of up to 100 grams in 1975, with several of the state's major cities later enacting further reforms.

Medical use was legalized in 2016 through a bill passed by the state legislature. The first licensed sales of medical cannabis began on January 16, 2019.

== Decriminalization (1975) ==
On August 22, 1975, Governor James Rhodes signed a bill decriminalizing cannabis, making Ohio the sixth state to do so.

Under Ohio law, the possession of up to 100 grams (3 1/2 oz) of marijuana is a "minor misdemeanor" which carries a maximum fine of $150. Possession of more than 100 grams (3 1/2 oz) but less than 200 grams (7 oz) of marijuana is a misdemeanor punishable by up to thirty days in jail and a $250 fine.

The FBI's Uniform Crime Reports report that in 2013, 17,000 arrests for marijuana possession were made in Ohio. A 2013 report by the ACLU found that in Ohio, African Americans were 4.1 times more likely than Caucasians to be arrested for marijuana possession.

== Issue 3: Failed recreational use initiative (2015) ==
In 2015, a ballot measure to legalize recreational use of cannabis was defeated on the November ballot. The measure, which appeared on the ballot as Issue 3, would have: (a) legalized the use and sale of cannabis by persons age 21 and older; (b) allowed the commercial-scale cultivation of cannabis, but only at ten pre-designated sites chosen by the measure's sponsors; (c) allowed persons age 21 and older to possess of up to 1 ounce of commercially-purchased cannabis and up to 8 ounces of home-cultivated cannabis; and (d) allowed home cultivation of up to four flowering cannabis plants for Ohioans who held a $50 license. The initiative was sponsored by a group of investors that included boy band singer Nick Lachey, NBA Hall of Famer Oscar Robertson, NFL defensive end Frostee Rucker, and fashion designer Nanette Lepore.

Support for Issue 3 was weaker than overall support for legalization, as the measure was criticized for its plan to create a monopoly of cannabis producers. The initiative failed to receive the endorsement of the Drug Policy Alliance and Marijuana Policy Project, and received only a "tepid endorsement" from NORML. Issue 3 was defeated by a 65–35 margin on November 3, 2015.

== Legalization of medical cannabis (2016) ==
On June 8, 2016, Governor John Kasich signed House Bill 523 to legalize the medical use of cannabis in Ohio. The bill, sponsored by Representative Stephen Huffman, was approved by an 18-15 vote in the Senate and a 67-29 vote in the House.

The bill set up a rulemaking process under which a "state-run or licensed system of growing facilities, testing labs, physician certification, patient registration, processors, and retail dispensaries" was established. It also required the number of dispensaries needed in each dispensary district to be re-evaluated every two years based on the distribution and number of patients. The system was required to be fully operational by September 2018, with the Ohio Department of Commerce to make rules for cultivators by May 6, 2017, to issue rules and regulations for cultivators, and the remainder of rules to be promulgated by October 2017. In the interim, patients with one of 21 qualifying conditions were permitted to go to Michigan or another state with legalized medical cannabis, legally acquire cannabis there, and bring it back to Ohio for use in accordance with Ohio law.

The state announced the awarding of the first 56 dispensary licenses on June 4, 2018, and the first licensed sales of cannabis at dispensaries occurred on January 16, 2019. As of September 2021, Ohio had 58 medical cannabis dispensaries, only 9 of which were owned by persons of color. The Ohio Board of Pharmacy announced in September 2021 another 73 planned licenses would be awarded via lottery, in part to allow equity of access. As of September 2021, Ohio had licensed 20 cultivators to grow up to 25,000 square feet of cannabis and 15 to grow up to 3,000 square feet. As of July 2021, there were 125,000 registered medical cannabis patients in Ohio, and by December 2023 the number had grown to 410,565.

The twenty-one qualifying conditions listed in the bill were: AIDS/HIV, Alzheimer's disease, amyotrophic lateral sclerosis (ALS), cancer, chronic traumatic encephalopathy (CTE), Crohn's disease, epilepsy (or other seizure disorder), fibromyalgia, glaucoma, hepatitis C, inflammatory bowel disease, multiple sclerosis, "pain that is either chronic and severe or intractable," Parkinson's disease, post-traumatic stress disorder, sickle cell anemia, spinal cord disease or injury, Tourette's syndrome, traumatic brain injury, ulcerative colitis, and "any other disease or condition added by the state medical board." Home cultivation and ingestion by way of smoking are prohibited under the law, which permits use only in edible, oil, vapor, patch, tincture, or plant matter form.

== "Smoke a joint, lose your license" repealed (2016) ==
Senate Bill 204 was signed into law by Governor Kasich on June 13, 2016. It repealed a requirement in state law that possession of cannabis or any other illegal drug be punished with a mandatory six month driver's license suspension (instead, the bill made the suspensions optional). The policy was originally enacted in the early 1990s in response to the passage of the Solomon–Lautenberg amendment at the federal level. Senate Bill 204 was sponsored by Republican State Senator Bill Seitz, passing with only two opposing votes in the House and unanimously in the Senate.

== Issue 2: Recreational use legalized (2023) ==
In July 2021, a group seeking to legalize cannabis for recreational use, known as the Coalition to Regulate Marijuana Like Alcohol, submitted 1,000 signatures to the Ohio Attorney General, seeking to qualify an initiated statute for the 2022 ballot. After receiving approval to proceed in August, the campaign submitted 206,943 signatures for approval in December 2021 and an additional 29,918 signatures in January 2022. In January 2022, the state certified that 136,729 valid signatures had been submitted (of a required 132,887) to force the state legislature to consider the measure. After the legislature failed to pass the proposal, the petitioners were required to collect an additional 124,000 valid signatures in order to place the proposal on the November ballot. However, in May 2022, the campaign announced that it had reached a settlement with the state to abandon the effort for 2022 (due to a technicality that could prevent it from appearing on the ballot) while also allowing all of the signatures that had already been submitted to go towards putting the proposal on the 2023 ballot. On August 16, 2023, after the campaign submitted an additional 127,772 valid signatures, the Ohio Secretary of State announced that the measure would appear on the 2023 ballot.

The initiative appeared as Issue 2 on the November 7, 2023 ballot, and was approved by voters by a 57–43 margin. It makes the following changes to Ohio law:

- Legalizes the possession of up to 2.5 ounces of cannabis and 15 grams (1/2 oz) of concentrate for adults 21 and over.
- Allows the cultivation of six plants for personal use, with a maximum of 12 plants per home.
- Allows the sale of cannabis at licensed dispensaries, with a 10 percent sales tax imposed.
- Divides tax revenue up between social equity and jobs programs (36 percent), localities that allow dispensaries to operate (36 percent), education and substance abuse programs (25 percent), and administrative costs (3 percent).

Possession and personal cultivation of cannabis became legal on the initiative effective date, December 7, 2023. The first licenses for growers, processors, and dispensaries must be issued within 9 months of the effective date. Leading up to and following the initiative's passage, top Republican leaders in Ohio indicated the possibility of making changes to some of the initiative's provisions.

The first licensed sales of recreational cannabis started on August 6, 2024.

== Municipal reforms ==
In September 2015, Toledo residents voted by a 70–30 margin to depenalize misdemeanor cannabis offenses, with no fines and no jail time for possession or cultivation of under 200 grams (7 oz), possession of hashish under 10 grams (1/3 oz), possession of paraphernalia, and gifts of under 20 grams (2/3 oz). Some provisions of the ordinance were later struck down in court, however.

In November 2018, Dayton residents voted by a 73–27 margin to approve an advisory referendum urging city leaders to decriminalize cannabis. City commissioners then voted unanimously in January to eliminate all penalties for possession of up to 100 grams (3 1/2 oz).

In June 2019, Cincinnati City Council voted 5–3 to eliminate all penalties for possession of up to 100 grams (3 1/2 oz) of cannabis except in cases of public use.

In July 2019, Columbus City Council voted unanimously to reduce the penalty to a $10 fine for possession of up to 100 grams (3 1/2 oz) and a $25 fine for between 100 and 200 grams (3 1/2 and 7 oz). Possession of paraphernalia was also reduced to a $10 fine.

In January 2020, Cleveland City Council voted 15–2 to eliminate penalties for possession of up to 200 grams (7 oz) of cannabis.

Other jurisdictions in Ohio that have approved decriminalization ordinances include Bellaire (2016), Logan (2016), Newark (2016), Roseville (2016), Athens (2017), Fremont (2018), Norwood (2018), Oregon (2018), Windham (2018), Bremen (2019), Nelsonville (2019), Northwood (2019), Plymouth (2020), Adena (2020), Glouster (2020), Jacksonville (2020), Trimble (2020), Martins Ferry (2021), Murray City (2021), New Lexington (2021), New Straitsville (2021), Rayland (2021), Tiltonsville (2021), Yorkville (2021), Fostoria (2022), Forest Park (2022), Corning (2022), Hemlock (2022), Kent (2022), Laurelville (2022), Rushville (2022), Shawnee (2022), and Helena (2023).

== See also ==
- Ohio NORML
