= Buckeye Local School District (Jefferson County) =

School district in Ohio

Address
- 6899 State Route 150 Dillonvale, Ohio, 43917; United States

District information
- Grades: Pre-school - 12
- Superintendent: Coy Sudvary
- Enrollment: 2,174

Other information
- Telephone: (740) 769-7395
- Fax: (740) 769-2361
- Website: Buckeye Local School District

Buckeye Local School District is a public school district based in Dillonvale, Ohio, United States. The school district includes all of Mount Pleasant, Smithfield, Warren, and Wells townships in southern Jefferson County as well as very small portions of Cross Creek, Steubenville, and Wayne townships in central Jefferson County. A portion of Short Creek Township in southeastern Harrison County and Pease Township in northeastern Belmont County also lie within the district.

Nine incorporated villages are served by Buckeye Local Schools: Adena, Dillonvale, Harrisville, Mount Pleasant, New Alexandria, Rayland, Smithfield, Tiltonsville, and Yorkville. Notable unincorporated communities in the district include Brilliant, Connorville, Greentown, Hopewell, Piney Fork, and Weems.

== New middle school ==
As of the 2024-2025 School year the two Buckeye Local Jr. High Schools, North Middle School and South-West Middle School, have combined to make a new Jr. High. This Jr. High (grades 6-8) takes up the 1st floor of the high school building, while grades 9-12 occupy the upper floor.

== Schools ==
=== High school ===
- Grades 9-12
  - Buckeye Local High School

=== Middle school ===
- Grades 6-8
  - Buckeye Local Junior High

=== Elementary schools ===
- Preschool-Grade 5
  - North Elementary School
  - South Elementary School
  - West Elementary School

=== Former schools ===
- Warren Consolidated High School in Tiltonsville

== See also ==
- List of school districts in Ohio
