= Connorville, Ohio =

- Census-designated place
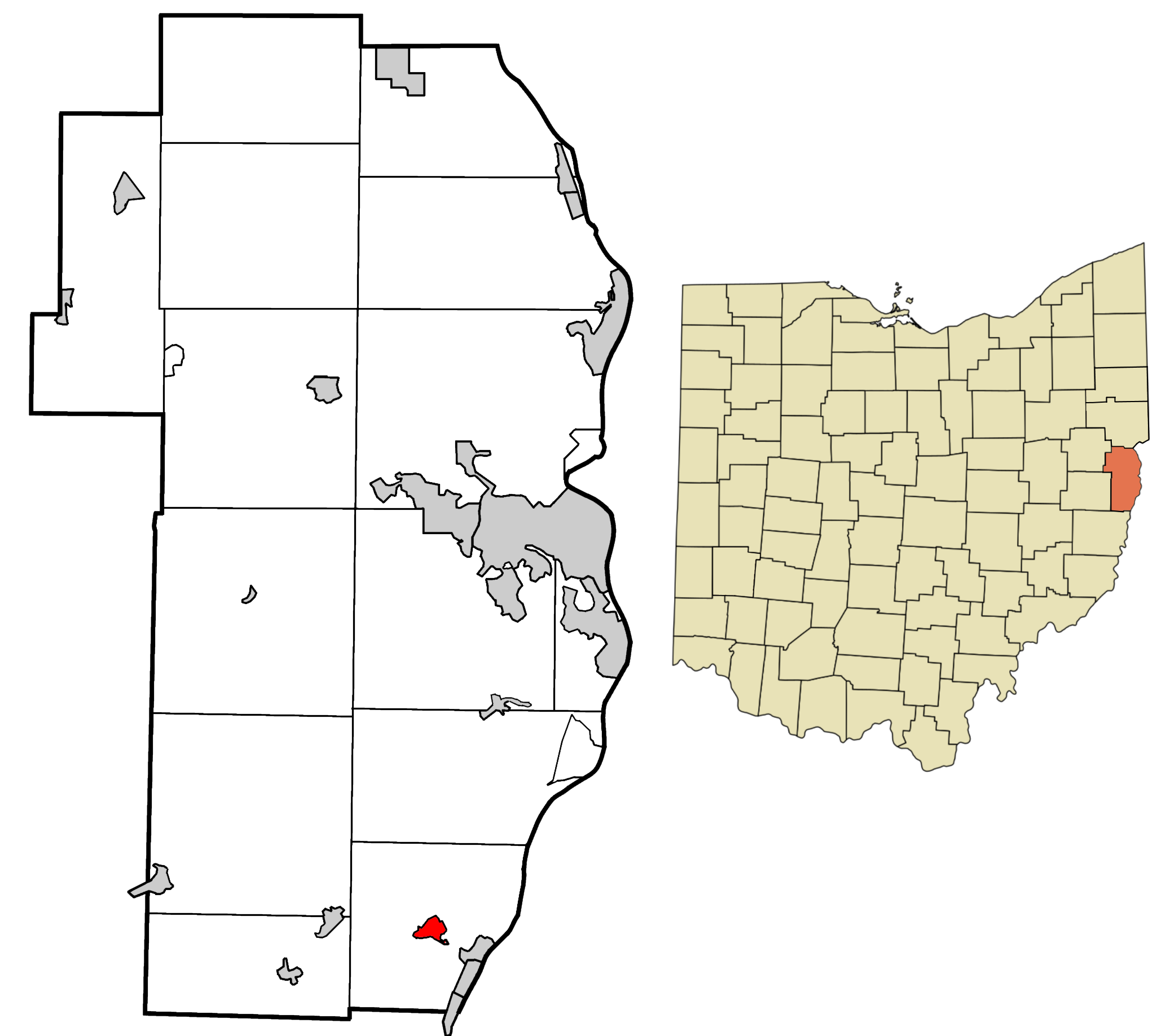
- Location of Connorville in Jefferson County and in the state of Ohio
- Coordinates: 40°11′37″N 80°43′03″W
- Country: United States
- State: Ohio
- County: Jefferson
- Township: Warren

Area
  - Total: 0.42 sq mi (1.08 km^{2})
  - Land: 0.42 sq mi (1.08 km^{2})
  - Water: 0 sq mi (0.00 km^{2})
- Elevation: 666 ft (203 m)

Population (2020)
  - Total: 160
  - Density: 382.4/sq mi (147.63/km^{2})
- Time zone: UTC-5 (Eastern (EST))
  - Summer (DST): UTC-4 (EDT)
- Area code: 740
- FIPS code: 39-18420
- GNIS Feature ID: 2628877

Connorville is an unincorporated community and census-designated place in southern Jefferson County, Ohio, United States. The population was 160 at the 2020 census. It is part of the Weirton–Steubenville metropolitan area.

== History ==
Connorville originally had a coal mine employing 60 men. A post office called Connorville was established in 1899, and remained in operation until 1958. Besides the post office, Connorville had a country store. The community was first listed as a census-designated place prior to the 2020 census.

== Geography ==
Connorville is in southern Jefferson County, in the center of Warren Township. Ohio State Route 150 runs along the southern side of the community, leading east 1.5 miles (2.4 km) to Rayland and west 5 miles (8 km) to Dillonvale. Connorville is in the valley of Short Creek, which flows east to the Ohio River at Rayland.

== Demographics ==
Historical population
Census	Pop.	Note	%±
2020	160		—
U.S. Decennial Census

== Education ==
Public education in Connorville is provided by the Buckeye Local School District. The campus of Buckeye Local High School is located in Connorville, although it has a Rayland mailing address. The current schools serving Connorville are:

- Buckeye South Elementary School – grades K-6
- Buckeye Local Junior High School – grades 7-8
- Buckeye Local High School – grades 9-12
