= Ohio State Route 150 =

State highway in Jefferson County, Ohio, US

State Route 150

Route information
- Maintained by ODOT
- Length: 13.30 mi (21.40 km)
- Existed: 1924–present

Major junctions
- West end: US 250 near Harrisville
- East end: SR 7 in Rayland

Location
- Country: United States
- State: Ohio
- Counties: Jefferson

Highway system
- Ohio State Highway System; Interstate; US; State; Scenic
← SR 149	→ SR 151

State Route 150 (SR 150) is an east–west state highway in the eastern portion of Ohio, a U.S. state. The western terminus of State Route 150 is at a T-intersection U.S. Route 250 approximately 1.50 miles (2.41 km) southeast of Harrisville. Its eastern terminus is in the village of Rayland at a parclo AB-2 interchange with State Route 7, with all of the ramps on the northeastern side of the interchange.

== Route description ==
State Route 150 runs entirely within the southern part of Jefferson County. No section of this highway is included as a part of the National Highway System, a network of highways deemed most important for the nation's economy, mobility and defense.

Ohio Department of Transportation (ODOT) is proposing a project to improve the intersection of State Route 150 and Market Street in the Village of Mount Pleasant, widening the State Route 150 to increase the turning radius. Estimated construction cost is $440,000 and is expected to begin in the summer of 2025.

== History ==
When established in 1924, State Route 150 was routed along the southern Jefferson County alignment that it maintains to this day. There have been no changes of major significance to State Route 150 since its inception.

== Major intersections ==
The entire route is in Jefferson County.

Location	mi	km	Destinations	Notes
Mount Pleasant Township	0.00	0.00	US 250 – Bridgeport, Cadiz	
Mount Pleasant	3.85	6.20	SR 647 south (Union Street) / Concord Street – Martins Ferry	Northern terminus of SR 647
Dillonvale	6.83	10.99	SR 152 north – Smithfield	Southern terminus of SR 152
Warren Township	13.30	21.40	SR 7	Interchange
1.000 mi = 1.609 km; 1.000 km = 0.621 mi

== State Route 150A ==
State Route 150A (SR 150A, OH 150A) is a short alternate route of State Route 150. Running just 0.43 miles in length, State Route 150A begins at State Route 150 when it travels under the State Route 7 bridge in Rayland. State Route 150A travels north until it intersects and becomes the on-ramp for State Route 7 northbound.
