= Greentown, Jefferson County, Ohio =

Unincorporated community in Ohio, U.S.

Coordinates: 40°15′05″N 80°46′06″W

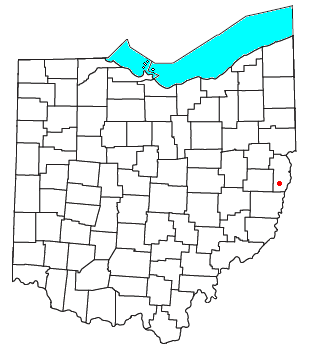
Location of Greentown in Jefferson County, Ohio

Greentown is an unincorporated community in eastern Smithfield Township, Jefferson County, Ohio, United States. It lies approximately 2 miles (3.2 km) south of Smithfield, on a small road. Part of the Dry Fork of Short Creek, a stream that meets the Ohio River at Rayland, flows past the community. It is located 11.7 miles (18.8 km) southwest of Steubenville, the county seat of Jefferson County. The community is part of the Weirton–Steubenville, WV-OH Metropolitan Statistical Area.

== Education ==
Public education in the community of Greentown is provided by the Buckeye Local School District.
