= Hodgen's Cemetery Mound =

Archaeological site in Ohio, United States

- U.S. National Register of Historic Places
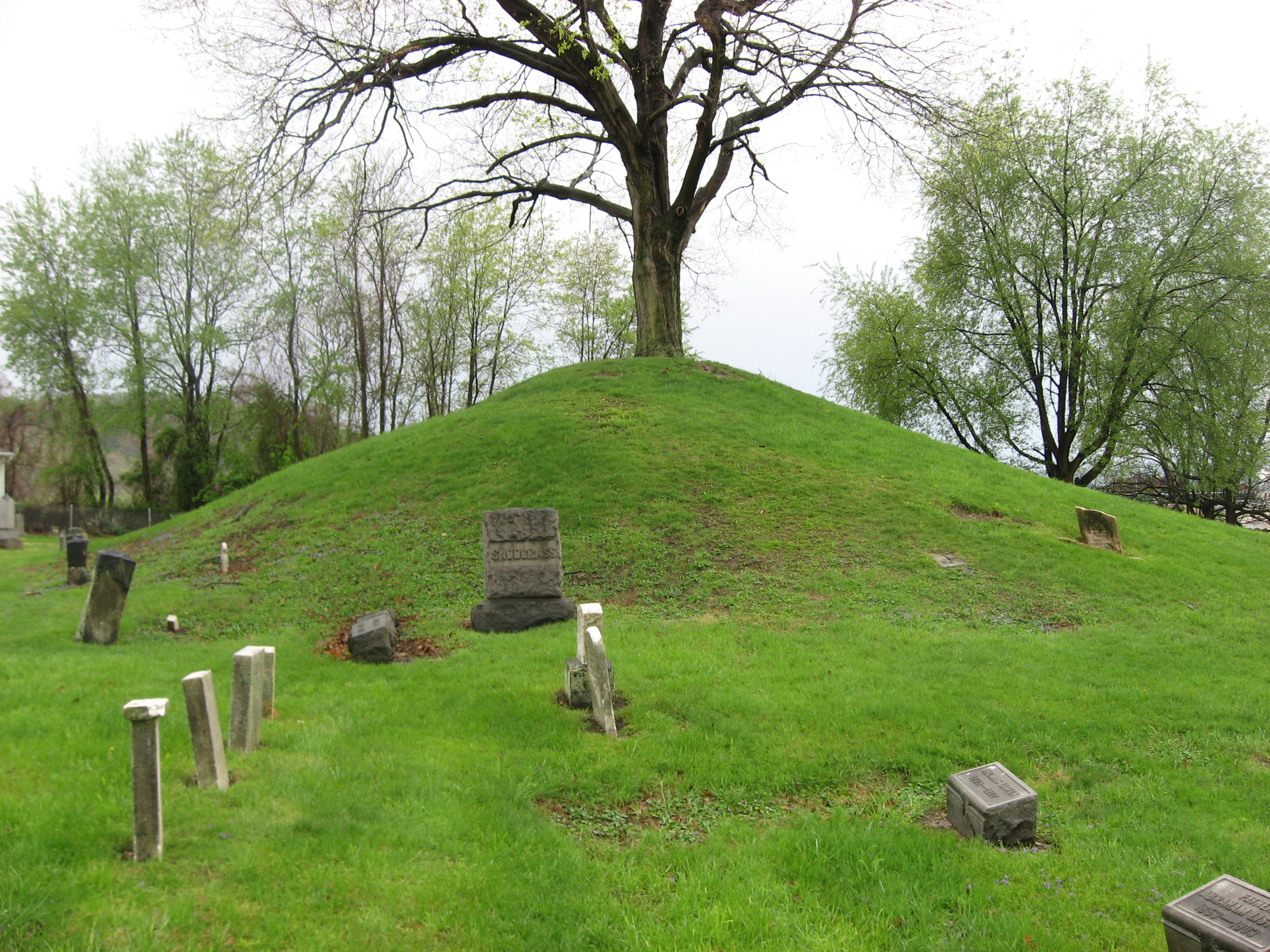
- Eastern side of the mound

- Location within Ohio Location within the United States
- Location: In Hodgen's Cemetery, off Walden Avenue
- Nearest city: Tiltonsville
- Coordinates: 40°10′28″N 80°41′41″W
- Area: 1 acre (0.40 ha)
- NRHP reference No.: 75001443
- Added to NRHP: September 25, 1975

The Hodgen's Cemetery Mound is a Native American mound in the far eastern part of the U.S. state of Ohio. Located in the village of Tiltonsville along the Ohio River shoreline of Jefferson County, the mound is a prehistoric earthwork and archaeological site, and it has been named a historic site.

During the nineteenth century, white residents of the village of Tiltonsville founded a cemetery around a small hill on the northern side of their village. A round, cone-shaped knoll with a tree growing from its top, the hill is surrounded by gravestones as old as the 1870s. At some point since that time, erosion of the hillside revealed human bones, including a skull with evidence of artificial cranial deformation. This practice was common among the prehistoric Adena culture; consequently, the bones allowed archaeologists to determine that the hill was a burial mound built by the Adena, who are believed to have inhabited the area at some point between 500 BC and AD 500.

Although the Hodgen's Cemetery Mound has never been excavated, it is a significant archaeological site — disproportionately large numbers of Adena burials with cranial deformation were societal élites who were typically buried with significant grave goods, and the intact state of the mound means that its original contents are likely to remain in their place. The mound has been disturbed by the digging of modern graves into its southwestern side, but the graves have not deformed the mound's general conical shape significantly.

In 1975, the Hodgen's Cemetery Mound was listed on the National Register of Historic Places, qualifying because of its archaeological value in the local area. It is one of two Jefferson County archaeological sites on the Register, along with the Speedway Mound in nearby Rayland.
