= Connorville =

Connorville may refer to:

- Connorville, Michigan
- Connorville, Ohio, an unincorporated community in Jefferson County
