= Greentown =

Greentown may refer to:

- Greentown, Indiana, town in Howard County, Indiana, United States
- Greentown, Ohio, census-designated place in Stark County, Ohio, United States
- Greentown, Jefferson County, Ohio, unincorporated community in Jefferson County, Ohio, United States
- Greentown, Pennsylvania
- Greentown China, a property developer headquartered in Hangzhou, China
- Hangzhou Greentown F.C., Chinese football club
