= Ohio State Route 647 =

State highway in eastern Ohio, US

State Route 647

Route information
- Maintained by ODOT
- Length: 9.96 mi (16.03 km)
- Existed: 1939–present

Major junctions
- West end: SR 7 in Martins Ferry
- East end: SR 150 in Mount Pleasant

Location
- Country: United States
- State: Ohio
- Counties: Belmont, Jefferson

Highway system
- Ohio State Highway System; Interstate; US; State; Scenic
← SR 646	→ SR 650

State Route 647 (SR 647) is a state highway in eastern Ohio connecting the city of Martins Ferry with the village of Mount Pleasant. 9.96 miles (16.03 km) in length, its southern terminus is at SR 7 and its northern terminus is at SR 150.

== Route description ==
SR 647 begins at a signalized intersection with the four-lane divided SR 7 in the city of Martins Ferry, near the Ohio River. Hanover Street continues southeast across a railroad towards the industrial sections of the city. SR 647 and Hanover Street head northwest into downtown Martins Ferry. The state highway briefly follows North 6th Street for about two blocks before turning left onto Carlisle Street. The route slowly climbs in elevation through the developed part of the city but as it exits the downtown residential neighborhood, the route heads up the side of a hill at a steeper slope and includes some hairpin turns. As it exits the city limits, SR 647 heads through hilly terrain and occasionally passes homes as it travels northwest. Upon entering the community of Morningview, the route turns north and then east briefly as it winds its way into a valley. After passing County Road 2 (former Ohio State Route 798), it turns north again and exits Belmont County for Jefferson County. This part of the route ascends in a narrow valley towards Mount Pleasant. At the top of the hill, the route curves west and enters the village limits on Union Street. After traveling 0.4 miles (0.64 km) through Mount Pleasant, the highway ends at the intersection of Union and Concord Streets; this intersection has SR 150 entering from the west and exiting to the north.

== History ==
The route was first designated a state highway in 1939 on the same alignment as it runs today. All of the road was gravel-paved at the time of its inclusion to the state highway system. By 1950, the entire route was asphalt-paved.

== Major intersections ==
County	Location	mi	km	Destinations	Notes
Belmont	Martins Ferry	0.00	0.00	SR 7	
Jefferson	Mount Pleasant	9.96	16.03	SR 150 (Union Street / Concord Street) – Cadiz, Dillonvale	
1.000 mi = 1.609 km; 1.000 km = 0.621 mi
