= Rush Run, Ohio =

Unincorporated community in Ohio, US

Coordinates: 40.23167°N 80.68056°W

Rush Run is an unincorporated community in Warren Township, Jefferson County, Ohio, United States. It is mainly around the area of Rush Run Road also known as County Road 17. It is named for David Rush who settled in that area in 1798.

== History ==
An early settler in that area - James Maxwell who built a cabin near Rush Run in 1772. Maxwell was cousin to Ebenezer Zane, fled to this area to avoid prosecution for a murder. He was later proven innocent. Maxwell lived in the area for two years but returned to Virginia because of the increasing threat of American Indian uprisings. He returned to Rush Run in 1780 with his young wife, Sally.

In 1910 Rush Run coal mines #1, 2 and 3 had a 5 foot #8 coal seam had a daily output of 2000 tons. There is no active mining in the area at this time.

A length of nearby Ohio State Route 7 bears the name of Hall of Fame baseball player Bill Mazeroski.

== Education ==
There was once a school in the area but now, public education in Rush Run is provided by the Buckeye Local School District.

== Churches ==
There are three churches in the Rush Run area: The Rush Run United Methodist Church (no longer affiliated with the Methodist organization) is right along County Road 17. The Hopewell Methodist Church, and the Rush Run Community Chapel, an independent congregation.

It is home to the nearby Hopewell United Methodist Church and cemetery. This site is recorded in 1785 by The American General Butler who refers to "The Sect called Methodists. In 1787 Circuit rider George Callahan preached the first Methodist sermon of record in the Northwest Territory. in 1798 the First Methodist Church in Eastern Ohio was built at Hopewell. In 1803 the first ordination in Ohio, of record, Bishop Francis Asbury ordained Rev. John Wrinshall on September 10, 1803 in Hopewell Church. In 1803 the First Methodist Meeting house in eastern Ohio was consecrated here by Bishop Francis Asbury September,11. The log church became too small by the growing congregation and was replaced in 1844 by a brick structure. The Ohio Conference cane was carved from logs from the original structure. The cane is presented to the oldest United Methodist minister in a ceremony at Annual Conference.

== Gallery ==
An 1856 map of the area

An 1871 map of the area

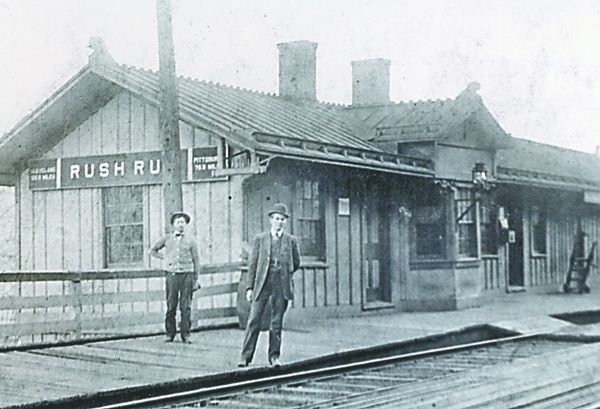
Railroad Depot - 1917

== See also ==
- List of cities and towns along the Ohio River
