= Charley Riffle =

American football player (1918–2002)

- Riffle at Notre Dame, 1938

Profile
- Position: Guard

Personal information
- Born: January 6, 1918; Dillonvale, Ohio, U.S.
- Died: February 28, 2002 (aged 84); Sun City West, Arizona, U.S.
- Listed height: 6 ft 0 in (1.83 m)
- Listed weight: 212 lb (96 kg)

Career information
- High school: Warren G. Harding (OH)
- College: Notre Dame

Career history
- Cleveland Rams (1944); New York Yankees (1946–1948)
- Stats at Pro Football Reference

Charles Francis Riffle (January 6, 1918 – February 28, 2002), also known as Chuck Riffle, was an American football player and coach. He played for Notre Dame from 1937 to 1939. He played professional football in the National Football League for the Cleveland Rams in 1944. While serving in the Navy, he played for the 1945 Fleet City Bluejackets football team. After the war, he played in the All-America Football Conference for the New York Yankees from 1946 to 1948.

== Early life ==
Riffle was born in Dillonville, Ohio, in 1918. He attended Warren G. Harding High School in Warren, Ohio.

== Notre Dame ==
Riffle played college football for Notre Dame as a fullback in 1937 and at right guard in 1938 and 1939. He missed most of the 1938 season with a broken leg.

== High school coach ==
After graduating from Notre Dame, Riffle coached football and basketball at Vincentian High School in Albany, New York, from 1940 to 1941 and at La Salle Institute in Troy, New York, from 1942 to 1943.

== Professional football and Fleet City ==
Riffle played for the Cleveland Rams in the National Football League during the 1944 NFL season. He appeared in eight games for the Rams, one of them as a starter.

In 1945, Riffle served in the United States Navy. He played for the 1945 Fleet City Bluejackets football team that compiled an 11–0–1 record.

After the war, Riffle played three seasons for the New York Yankees of the All-America Football Conference from 1946 to 1948. He appeared in 42 games for the Yankees 17 as a starter.

== Later life ==
In 1949, Riffle was hired as the head football coach at his alma mater, Warren G. Harding High School in Warren, Ohio. In eight years as the school's head coach, he compiled a 50-33-1 record.

He died in 2002 in Sun City West, Arizona.
