= Ohio NORML =

- Logo
- Parent organization: National Organization for the Reform of Marijuana Laws (NORML)
- Website: ohionorml.org

Ohio NORML is the National Organization for the Reform of Marijuana Laws affiliate for the U.S. state of Ohio.

In 2015, the chapter's leader, Rob Ryan, was removed from his position for supporting ResponsibleOhio's effort to legalize marijuana.

The organization gave Ohio Governor Mike DeWine an "F" grade, citing DeWine's opposition to the legalization of cannabis "despite the recent enactment of legalization in nearby states."

== See also ==
- Cannabis in Ohio
- List of cannabis organizations
