= Samuel Grimshaw =

- Born: March 2, 1840; Smithfield, Ohio
- Died: November 9, 1918 (aged 78)
- Burial place: Holton, Kansas
- Military career
- Allegiance: United States of America
- Branch: United States Army
- Rank: Private
- Units: Company B, 52nd Ohio Volunteer Infantry Regiment
- Conflicts: American Civil War
- Awards: Medal of Honor

Samuel Grimshaw (March 2, 1840 - November 9, 1918) was an American soldier who fought in the American Civil War. Grimshaw received his country's highest award for bravery during combat, the Medal of Honor. Grimshaw's medal was won for his actions in Atlanta, Georgia, when he threw away a lit shell that had fallen near his company on August 6, 1864. He was honored with the award on April 5, 1894.

Grimshaw was born in Jefferson County, Ohio, entered service in Smithfield, Ohio, and was buried in Holton, Kansas.

== Medal of Honor citation ==
The President of the United States of America, in the name of Congress, takes pleasure in presenting the Medal of Honor to Private Samuel Grimshaw, United States Army, for extraordinary heroism on 6 August 1864, while serving with Company B, 52d Ohio Infantry, in action at Atlanta, Georgia. Private Grimshaw saved the lives of some of his comrades, and greatly imperiled his own by picking up and throwing away a lighted shell which had fallen in the midst of the company.

== See also ==
- List of American Civil War Medal of Honor recipients: G–L
