= Buckeye Local High School =

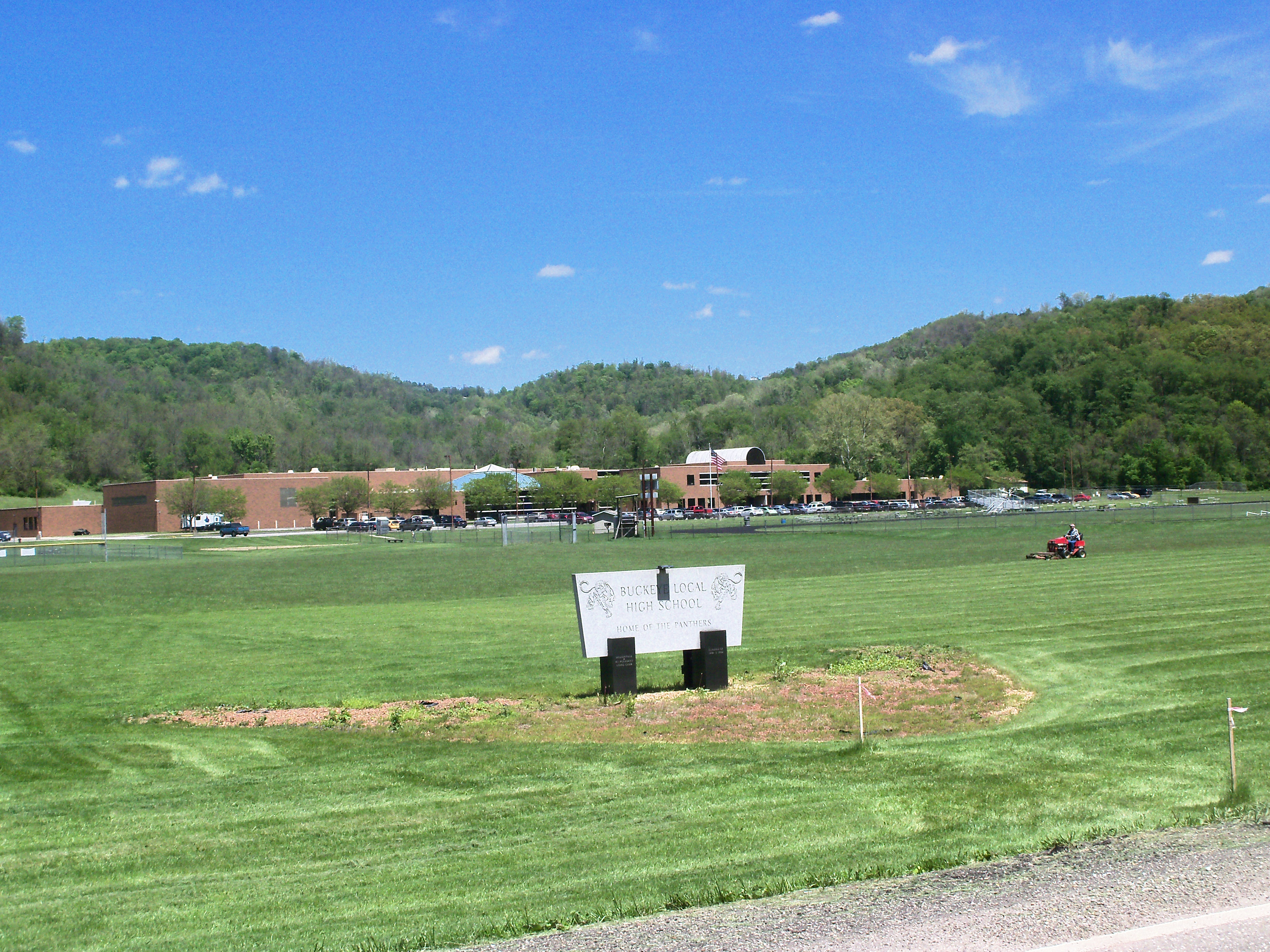

Location
- 10692 State Route 150; Rayland, Ohio 43943; United States; 40°11′37″N 80°43′9″W

Information
- Type: Public high school
- Established: 1990
- School district: Buckeye Local School District
- Superintendent: Coy Sudvary
- CEEB code: 364985
- Principal: Lucas Parsons
- Teaching staff: 28.00 (FTE)
- Grades: 9-12
- Student to teacher ratio: 12.82
- Campus type: Fringe Rural
- Colors: Navy and Silver
- Athletics conference: Ohio Valley Athletic Conference
- Mascot: Panther
- Team name: Panthers
- Rival: Martins Ferry Purple Riders
- Athletic Director: Jeffery Patrick
- Website: blhs.buckeyelocal.net

Buckeye Local High School is a public high school in Connorville, Ohio, United States, near Rayland. It is the only secondary school in the Buckeye Local School District. Athletic teams compete as the Buckeye Local Panthers in the Ohio High School Athletic Association as a member of the Ohio Valley Athletic Conference.

Since 2010, the Buckeye Local Junior High School, grades 6-8 (as of the 2024-2025 school year), occupy the lower floor of the high school building. Grades 9-12, occupying the upper floor, are administered separately.

== History ==
Buckeye Local High School was established by the Buckeye Local School District by the consolidation of the three existing high schools in the district: Buckeye North, Buckeye South, and Buckeye West, all in southern Jefferson County. The new high school opened in the fall of 1990.

== Athletics ==
=== OHSAA State Championships ===
- Boys Baseball* – 1932, 1942
- Boys Basketball** - 1943

*Titles won by Tiltonsville High School prior to consolidation.
**Title won by Yorkville High School prior to consolidation.

=== OVAC Conference Championships ===
- Baseball - 2004
- Girls Basketball - 1992
- Boys Cross Country - 1998, 2003, 2004, 2005
- Girls Cross Country - 1997, 1998, 2007
- Football - 1991, 1994, 2003, 2009
- Softball - 1999, 2012, 2013
- Girls Track - 2007
- Wrestling - 1996, 1997, 2004

== Notable alumni ==
- Stan Boroski** - former MLB player for the Milwaukee Brewers and Kansas City Royals, current bullpen coach for the Tampa Bay Rays
- Dino Gaudio** - former men's college basketball coach
- Bill Mazeroski* - former MLB player for the Pittsburgh Pirates, Baseball Hall of Fame inductee

*Attended Warren Consolidated High School prior to consolidation into Buckeye Local High School.
**Attended Buckeye South High School prior to consolidation into Buckeye Local High School.
