= Yorkville, Ohio =

- Village
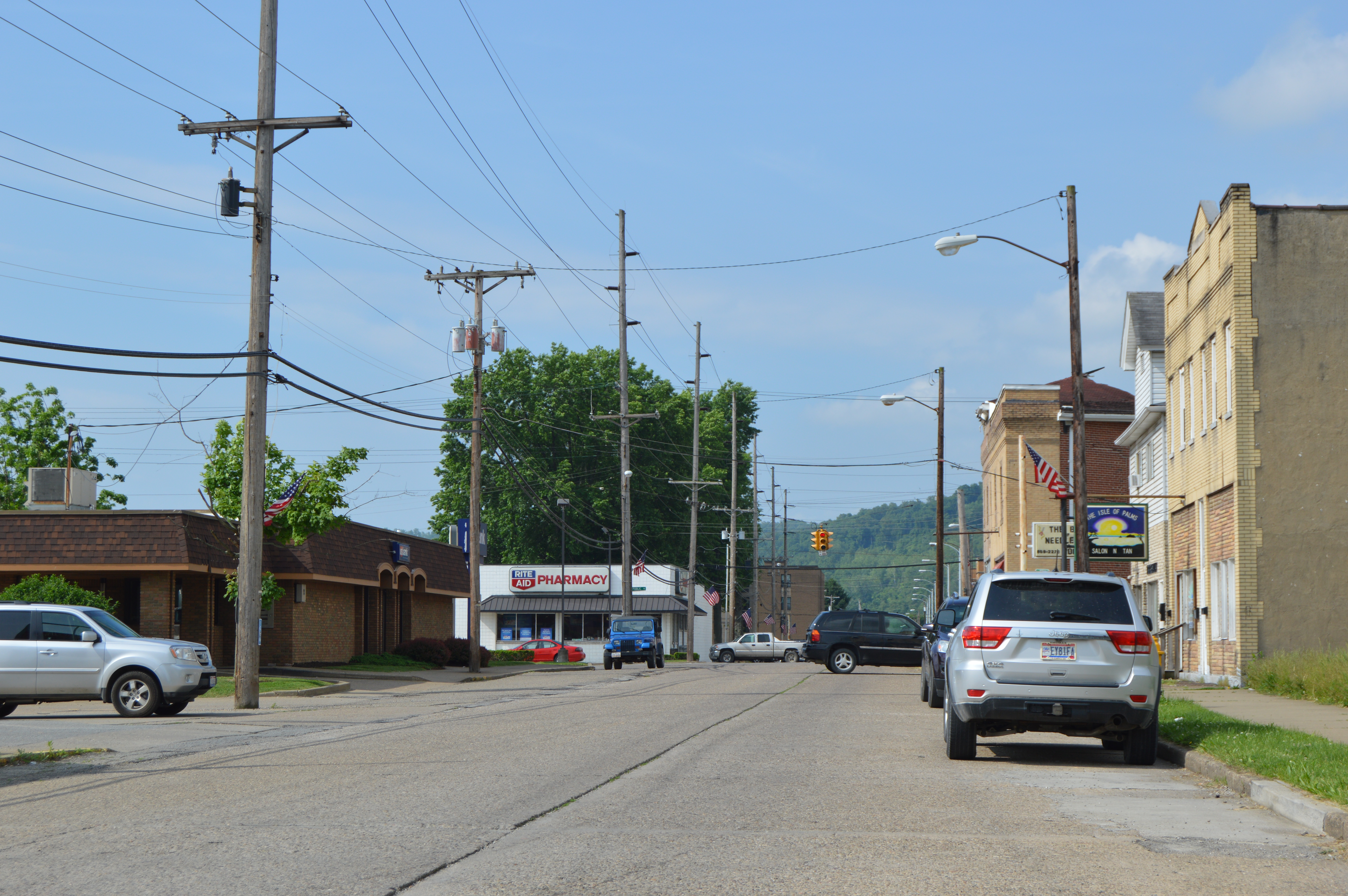
- Business district

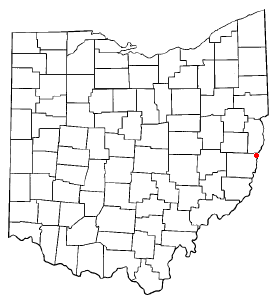
- Location of Yorkville, Ohio

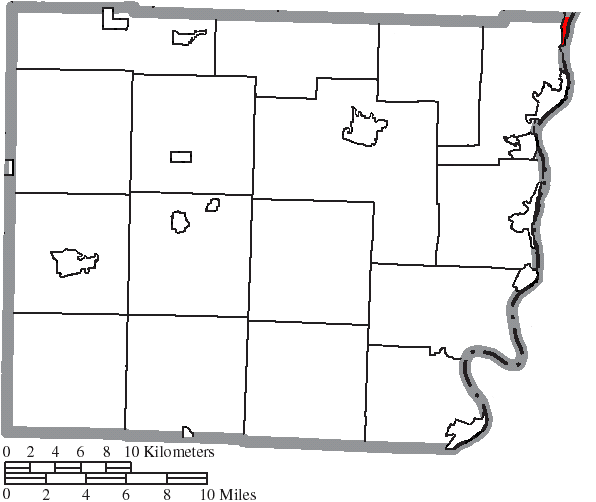
- Location of Yorkville in Belmont County
- Coordinates: 40°09′10″N 80°42′28″W
- Country: United States
- State: Ohio
- Counties: Belmont, Jefferson
- Townships: Warren, Pease

Government
  - Mayor: Dana Brown

Area
  - Total: 0.60 sq mi (1.55 km^{2})
  - Land: 0.59 sq mi (1.53 km^{2})
  - Water: 0.0077 sq mi (0.02 km^{2})
- Elevation: 676 ft (206 m)

Population (2020)
  - Total: 968
  - Density: 1,634/sq mi (630.9/km^{2})
- Time zone: UTC-5 (Eastern (EST))
  - Summer (DST): UTC-4 (EDT)
- ZIP code: 43971
- Area code: 740
- FIPS code: 39-87178
- GNIS feature ID: 2399754

Yorkville is a village in Belmont and Jefferson counties in the U.S. state of Ohio. The population was 968 at the 2020 census. Yorkville lies within two Metropolitan Statistical Areas; the Belmont County portion is part of the Wheeling metropolitan area, while the Jefferson County portion is part of the Weirton–Steubenville metropolitan area.

== History ==
A post office called Yorkville was established in 1867. Yorkville was originally a mining community.

== Geography ==
Yorkville is located along the Ohio River.

According to the United States Census Bureau, the village has a total area of 0.60 square miles (1.55 km^{2}), all land.

== Demographics ==
Historical population
Census	Pop.	Note	%±
1920	1,754		—
1930	1,963		11.9%
1940	1,961		−0.1%
1950	1,854		−5.5%
1960	1,801		−2.9%
1970	1,656		−8.1%
1980	1,447		−12.6%
1990	1,246		−13.9%
2000	1,230		−1.3%
2010	1,079		−12.3%
2020	968		−10.3%
U.S. Decennial Census

=== 2010 census ===
As of the 2010 census, there were 1,079 people, 498 households, and 291 families living in the village. The population density was 1,798.3 inhabitants per square mile (694.3/km^{2}). There were 570 housing units at an average density of 950.0 per square mile (366.8/km^{2}). The racial makeup of the village was 98.1% White, 1.4% African American, 0.1% Native American, and 0.4% from two or more races. Hispanic or Latino of any race were 0.1% of the population.

There were 498 households, of which 23.5% had children under the age of 18 living with them, 40.2% were married couples living together, 13.1% had a female householder with no husband present, 5.2% had a male householder with no wife present, and 41.6% were non-families. 36.1% of all households were made up of individuals, and 15.6% had someone living alone who was 65 years of age or older. The average household size was 2.11 and the average family size was 2.69.

The median age in the village was 46.4 years. 17% of residents were under the age of 18; 8.6% were between the ages of 18 and 24; 22.6% were from 25 to 44; 29.8% were from 45 to 64; and 22.1% were 65 years of age or older. The gender makeup of the village was 47.5% male and 52.5% female.

=== 2000 census ===
As of the 2000 census, there were 1,230 people, 534 households, and 330 families living in the village. The population density was 2,013.0 inhabitants per square mile (777.2/km^{2}). There were 600 housing units at an average density of 981.9 per square mile (379.1/km^{2}). The racial makeup of the village was 97.07% White, 1.63% African American, 0.33% from other races, and 0.98% from two or more races. Hispanic or Latino of any race were 0.33% of the population.

There were 534 households, out of which 27.9% had children under the age of 18 living with them, 45.7% were married couples living together, 13.1% had a female householder with no husband present, and 38.2% were non-families. 33.3% of all households were made up of individuals, and 18.5% had someone living alone who was 65 years of age or older. The average household size was 2.25 and the average family size was 2.88.

In the village, the population was spread out, with 22.8% under the age of 18, 9.0% from 18 to 24, 23.0% from 25 to 44, 19.8% from 45 to 64, and 25.4% who were 65 years of age or older. The median age was 41 years. For every 100 females, there were 94.3 males. For every 100 females age 18 and over, there were 83.8 males.

The median income for a household in the village was $29,583, and the median income for a family was $37,250. Males had a median income of $31,063 versus $20,909 for females. The per capita income for the village was $15,957. About 7.4% of families and 10.0% of the population were below the poverty line, including 16.9% of those under age 18 and 4.3% of those age 65 or over.

== Education ==
Public education in the village of Yorkville is provided by the Buckeye Local School District.

== Climate ==
The climate in this area is characterized by relatively high temperatures and evenly distributed precipitation throughout the year. According to the Köppen Climate Classification system, Yorkville has a Humid subtropical climate, abbreviated "Cfa" on climate maps.

Climate data for Yorkville, Ohio
Month	Jan	Feb	Mar	Apr	May	Jun	Jul	Aug	Sep	Oct	Nov	Dec	Year
Mean daily maximum °C (°F)	3 (37)	4 (40)	9 (49)	17 (62)	22 (71)	26 (79)	28 (83)	28 (82)	24 (76)	18 (64)	12 (53)	5 (41)	16 (61)
Daily mean °C (°F)	−1 (30)	0 (32)	4 (40)	11 (51)	16 (60)	21 (69)	23 (74)	23 (73)	19 (66)	12 (54)	7 (44)	1 (34)	11 (52)
Mean daily minimum °C (°F)	−6 (22)	−4 (24)	−1 (30)	4 (40)	10 (50)	16 (60)	18 (64)	17 (63)	13 (56)	7 (45)	2 (35)	−3 (27)	6 (43)
Average precipitation mm (inches)	61 (2.4)	61 (2.4)	89 (3.5)	89 (3.5)	100 (4)	91 (3.6)	100 (4.1)	94 (3.7)	79 (3.1)	64 (2.5)	76 (3)	71 (2.8)	980 (38.5)
Source: Weatherbase

== See also ==
- List of cities and towns along the Ohio River
