= Mount Pleasant Township, Jefferson County, Ohio =

Township in Ohio, US

- Township
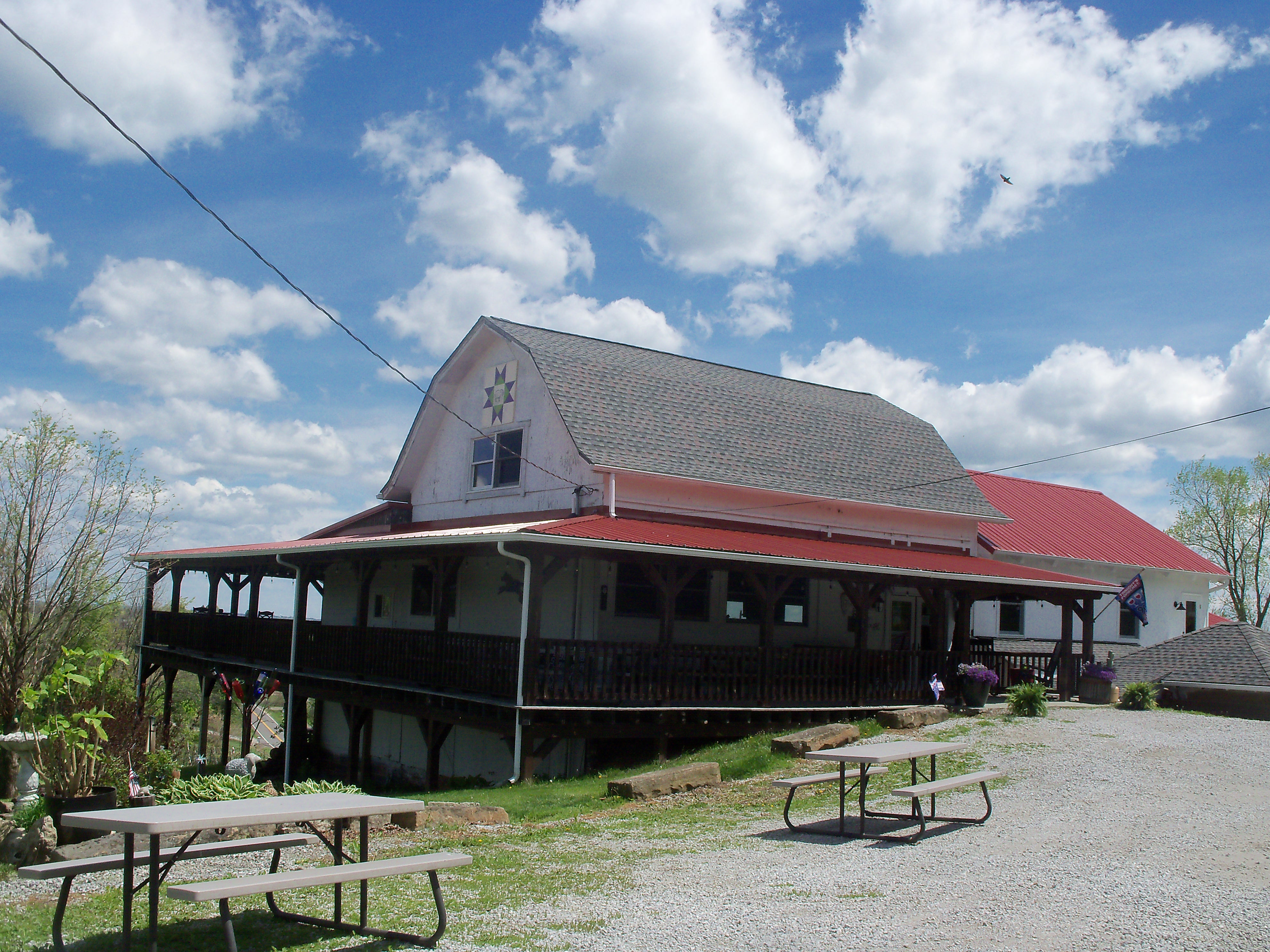
- Black Sheep Vineyard at the corner of Routes 150 and 250

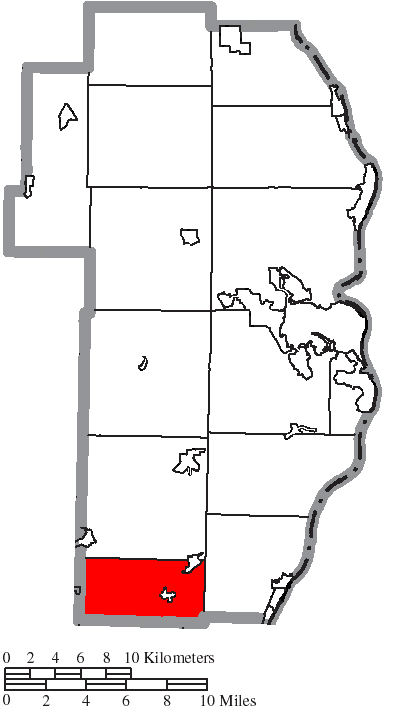
- Location of Mount Pleasant Township in Jefferson County
- Coordinates: 40°11′16″N 80°47′32″W
- Country: United States
- State: Ohio
- County: Jefferson

Area
  - Total: 19.1 sq mi (49.5 km^{2})
  - Land: 19.1 sq mi (49.5 km^{2})
  - Water: 0.039 sq mi (0.1 km^{2})
- Elevation: 948 ft (289 m)

Population (2020)
  - Total: 2,191
  - Density: 115/sq mi (44.3/km^{2})
- Time zone: UTC-5 (Eastern (EST))
  - Summer (DST): UTC-4 (EDT)
- ZIP code: 43939
- Area code: 740
- FIPS code: 39-52990
- GNIS feature ID: 1086380

Mount Pleasant Township is one of the fourteen townships of Jefferson County, Ohio, United States. The 2020 census found 2,191 people in the township.

== Geography ==
Located in the southwestern corner of the county, it borders the following townships:

- Smithfield Township - north
- Warren Township - east
- Pease Township, Belmont County - southeast
- Colerain Township, Belmont County - south
- Wheeling Township, Belmont County - southwest corner
- Short Creek Township, Harrison County - west

Two villages are located in Mount Pleasant Township: Mount Pleasant in the center, and part of Dillonvale in the northeast.

== Name and history ==
Mount Pleasant Township was founded in 1807. It was named from the village of Mount Pleasant contained within its borders.

It is the only Mount Pleasant Township statewide.

== Government ==
The township is governed by a three-member board of trustees, who are elected in November of odd-numbered years to a four-year term beginning on the following January 1. Two are elected in the year after the presidential election and one is elected in the year before it. There is also an elected township fiscal officer, who serves a four-year term beginning on April 1 of the year after the election, which is held in November of the year before the presidential election. Vacancies in the fiscal officership or on the board of trustees are filled by the remaining trustees.
