= Adena, Ohio =

Village in Jefferson County, Ohio, US

- Village
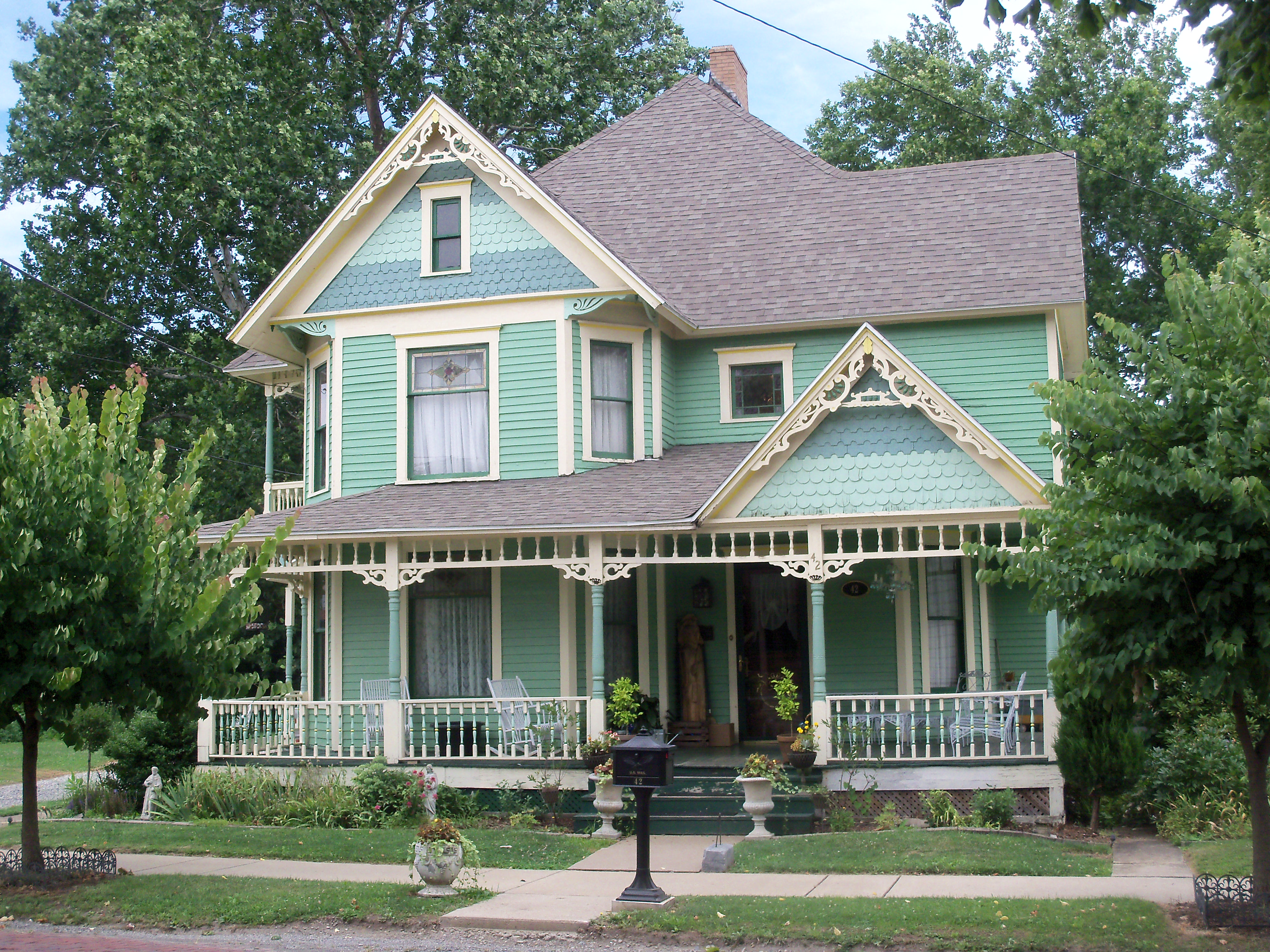
- Ann E. Lewis Bernhard House

- Seal

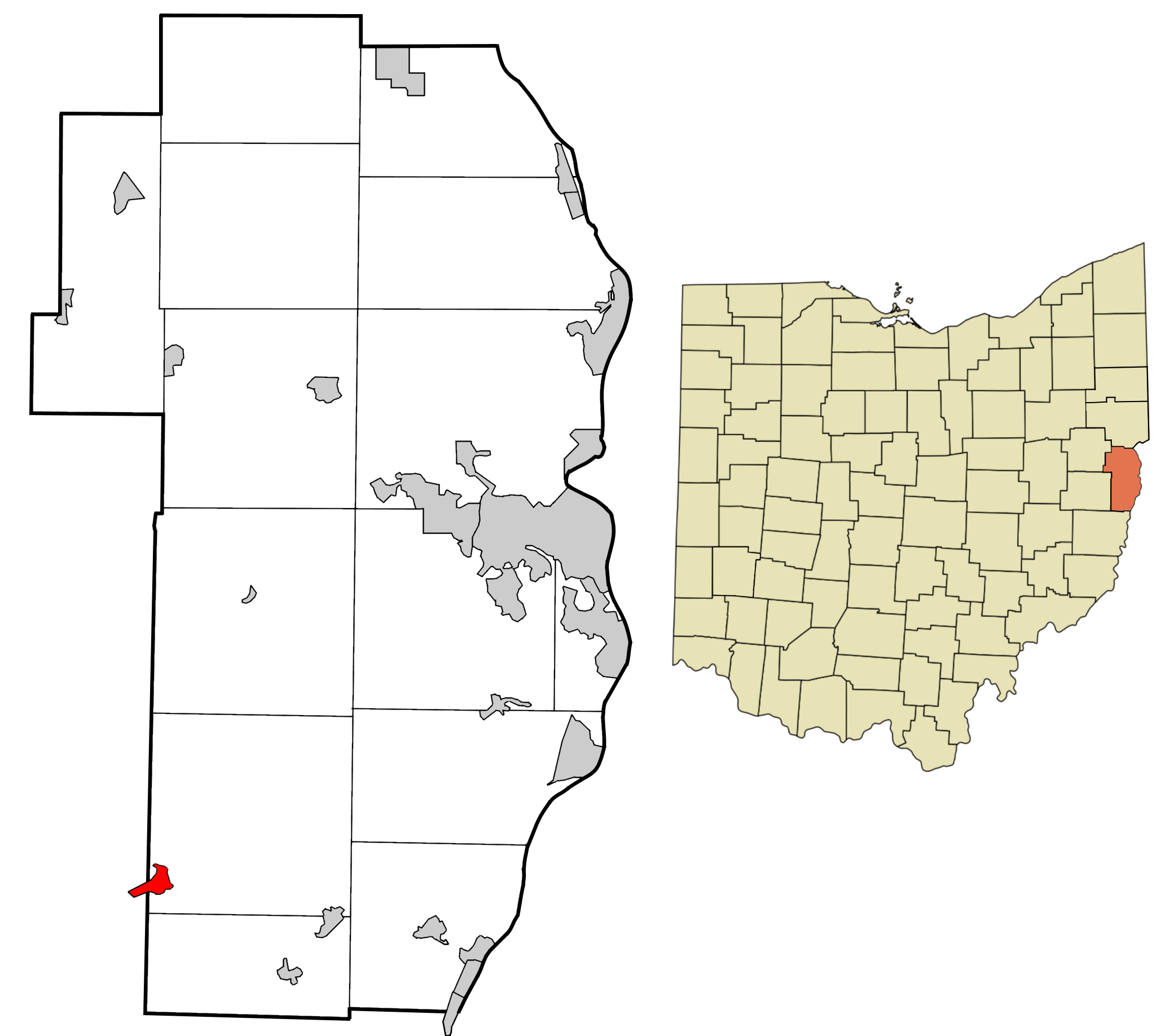
- Location of Adena in Jefferson County, Ohio

- Location within Ohio Location within the United States
- Coordinates: 40°13′02″N 80°52′28″W
- Country: United States
- State: Ohio
- Counties: Jefferson, Harrison
- Townships: Smithfield, Short Creek

Area
  - Total: 0.54 sq mi (1.39 km^{2})
  - Land: 0.54 sq mi (1.39 km^{2})
  - Water: 0 sq mi (0.00 km^{2})
- Elevation: 869 ft (265 m)

Population (2020)
  - Total: 664
  - Estimate (2023): 646
  - Density: 1,236.2/sq mi (477.29/km^{2})
- Time zone: UTC-5 (Eastern (EST))
  - Summer (DST): UTC-4 (EDT)
- ZIP code: 43901
- Area code: 740
- FIPS code: 39-00464
- GNIS feature ID: 2397916
- Website: villageofadena.com

Adena (/əˈdiːnə/ ə-DEEN-ə) is a village in Jefferson and Harrison counties in the U.S. state of Ohio. The population was 664 at the 2020 census. It is part of the Weirton–Steubenville metropolitan area.

== History ==
When the village was being established, Ohio General Assembly member John McLaughlin (1803-1816) suggested to name it after Adena Mansion, then Governor Thomas Worthington's home and estate in Chillicothe, Ohio. A post office called Adena was established in 1855 with Peter Hixon as the first Postmaster, although there was no mail route yet at the time. After a mail route was established, John Bendell was appointed as the first acting Postmaster. The post office is still in operation.

== Geography ==
According to the United States Census Bureau, the village has a total area of 0.54 square miles (1.40 km^{2}), all land.

== Demographics ==
Historical population
Census	Pop.	Note	%±
1880	45		—
1910	570		—
1920	724		27.0%
1930	1,286		77.6%
1940	1,703		32.4%
1950	1,517		−10.9%
1960	1,317		−13.2%
1970	1,134		−13.9%
1980	1,062		−6.3%
1990	842		−20.7%
2000	815		−3.2%
2010	759		−6.9%
2020	664		−12.5%
2023 (est.)	646	▼	−2.7%
U.S. Decennial Census

=== 2010 census ===
As of the census of 2010, there were 759 people, 319 households, and 220 families living in the village. The population density was 1,405.6 inhabitants per square mile (542.7/km^{2}). There were 359 housing units at an average density of 664.8 per square mile (256.7/km^{2}). The racial makeup of the village was 97.9% White, 0.3% African American, 0.1% Pacific Islander, and 1.7% from two or more races. Hispanic or Latino of any race were 0.4% of the population.

There were 319 households, of which 29.8% had children under the age of 18 living with them, 51.7% were married couples living together, 10.3% had a female householder with no husband present, 6.9% had a male householder with no wife present, and 31.0% were non-families. 27.9% of all households were made up of individuals, and 15.7% had someone living alone who was 65 years of age or older. The average household size was 2.38 and the average family size was 2.83.

The median age in the village was 43.9 years. 21.6% of residents were under the age of 18; 7.5% were between the ages of 18 and 24; 22% were from 25 to 44; 29.1% were from 45 to 64; and 19.8% were 65 years of age or older. The gender makeup of the village was 47.8% male and 52.2% female.

=== 2000 census ===
As of the census of 2000, there were 815 people, 348 households, and 243 families living in the village. The population density was 1,514.9 inhabitants per square mile (584.9/km^{2}). There were 389 housing units at an average density of 723.1 per square mile (279.2/km^{2}). The racial makeup of the village was 98.28% White, 1.23% African American, 0.12% Asian, and 0.37% from two or more races.

There were 348 households, out of which 25.0% had children under the age of 18 living with them, 56.9% were married couples living together, 9.5% had a female householder with no husband present, and 29.9% were non-families. 27.9% of all households were made up of individuals, and 16.7% had someone living alone who was 65 years of age or older. The average household size was 2.34 and the average family size was 2.85.

In the village, the population was spread out, with 19.4% under the age of 18, 7.7% from 18 to 24, 26.3% from 25 to 44, 26.6% from 45 to 64, and 20.0% who were 65 years of age or older. The median age was 43 years. For every 100 females there were 91.3 males. For every 100 females age 18 and over, there were 86.6 males.

The median income for a household in the village was $25,341, and the median income for a family was $30,156. Males had a median income of $30,313 versus $17,679 for females. The per capita income for the village was $14,941. About 16.9% of families and 20.6% of the population were below the poverty line, including 30.2% of those under age 18 and 14.4% of those age 65 or over.

== Education ==
Public education in the village of Adena is provided by the Buckeye Local School District. Adena has a public library, a branch of the Public Library of Steubenville and Jefferson County.

== Notable people ==
- Jerry W. Krupinski, member of the Ohio House of Representatives from 1987–2000
- Jim Moscrip, National Football League player
