= Tiltonsville, Ohio =

- Village
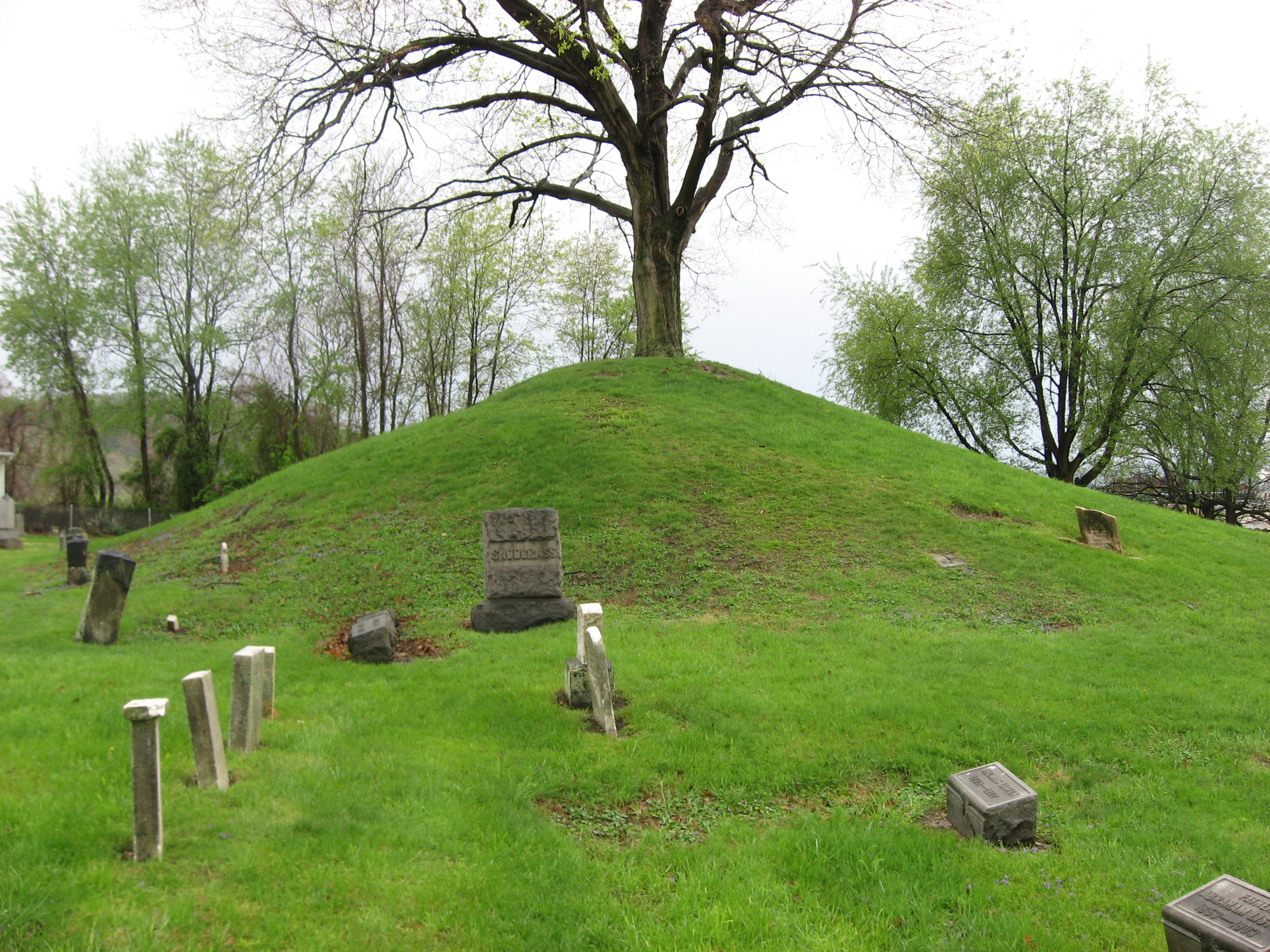
- Hodgen's Cemetery Mound

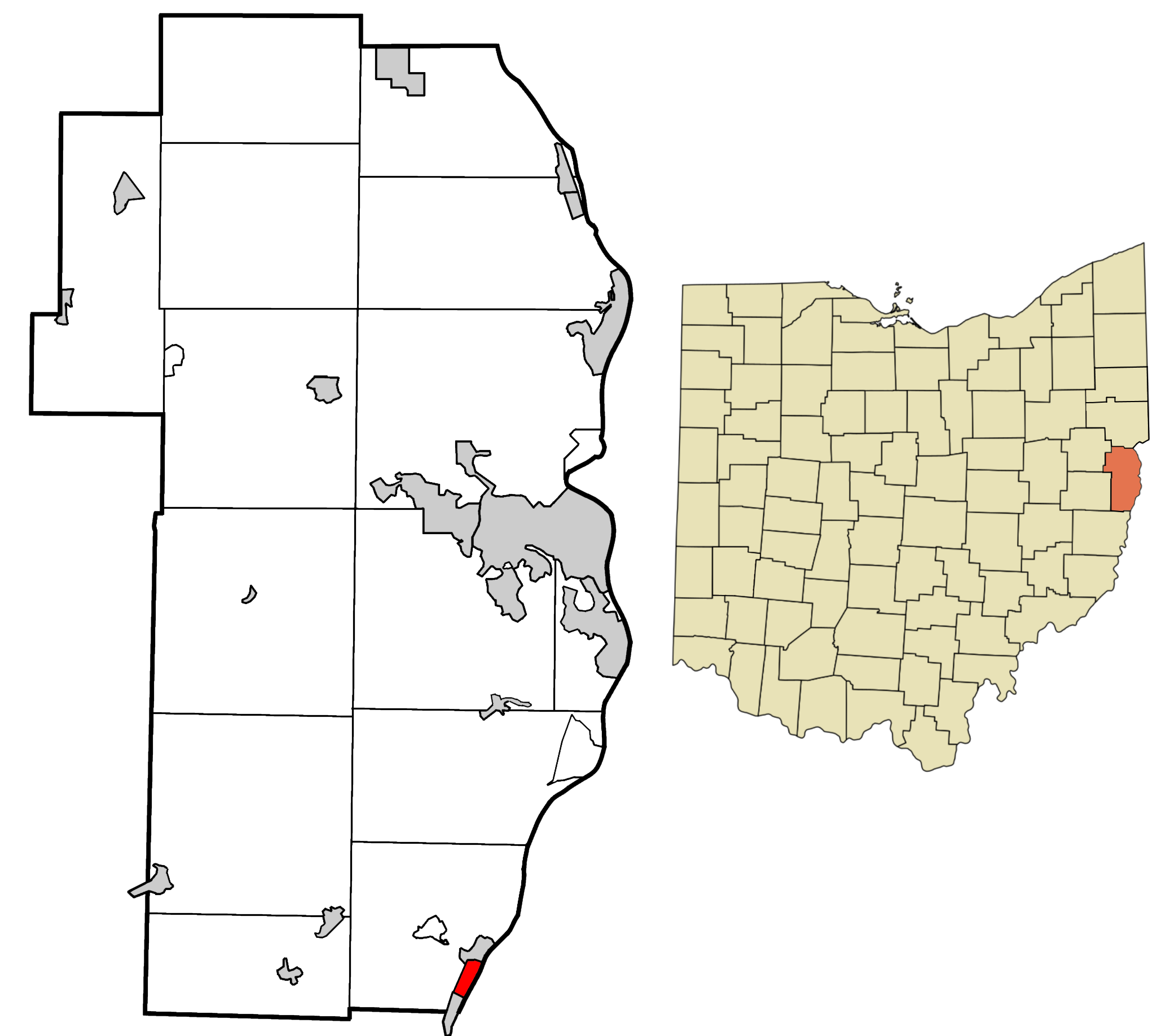
- Location of Tiltonsville in Jefferson County, Ohio

- Location within Ohio Location within the United States
- Coordinates: 40°10′20″N 80°41′50″W
- Country: United States
- State: Ohio
- County: Jefferson
- Township: Warren

Area
  - Total: 0.56 sq mi (1.44 km^{2})
  - Land: 0.53 sq mi (1.36 km^{2})
  - Water: 0.031 sq mi (0.08 km^{2})
- Elevation: 666 ft (203 m)

Population (2020)
  - Total: 1,259
  - Density: 2,400.7/sq mi (926.92/km^{2})
- Time zone: UTC-5 (Eastern (EST))
  - Summer (DST): UTC-4 (EDT)
- ZIP code: 43963
- Area code: 740
- FIPS code: 39-76806
- GNIS feature ID: 2399983

Tiltonsville is a village in Jefferson County, Ohio, United States, along the Ohio River. The population was 1,259 at the 2020 census. It is a part of the Weirton–Steubenville metropolitan area.

== History ==
Tiltonsville was laid out in 1806 by John Tilton, and named for him. He purchased this land and full Section No. 22 from the United States at a land auction in Pittsburgh on November 25, 1796. Tilton paid $3,623.76 for 900 acres of land – half at the time of purchase and the balance on November 18, 1797; his deed by patents dated November 20, 1797, and it is signed by President John Adams. A post office called Tiltonville was established in 1852, and the name was changed to Tiltonsville in 1875.

Tiltonsville is the location of the Hodgen's Cemetery Mound, a burial mound built by the prehistoric Adena culture.

== Geography ==
According to the United States Census Bureau, the village has a total area of 0.56 square miles (1.45 km^{2}), of which 0.53 square miles (1.37 km^{2}) is land and 0.03 square miles (0.08 km^{2}) is water.

== Demographics ==
Historical population
Census	Pop.	Note	%±
1900	308		—
1910	366		18.8%
1920	1,694		362.8%
1930	2,242		32.3%
1940	2,360		5.3%
1950	2,202		−6.7%
1960	2,454		11.4%
1970	2,123		−13.5%
1980	1,750		−17.6%
1990	1,517		−13.3%
2000	1,329		−12.4%
2010	1,372		3.2%
2020	1,259		−8.2%
U.S. Decennial Census

=== 2010 census ===
As of the census of 2010, there were 1,372 people, 605 households, and 365 families living in the village. The population density was 2,588.7 inhabitants per square mile (999.5/km^{2}). There were 685 housing units at an average density of 1,292.5 per square mile (499.0/km^{2}). The racial makeup of the village was 97.6% White, 0.6% African American, 0.1% Native American, 0.1% Asian, 0.1% Pacific Islander, 0.2% from other races, and 1.4% from two or more races. Hispanic or Latino of any race were 0.7% of the population.

There were 605 households, of which 22.3% had children under the age of 18 living with them, 42.8% were married couples living together, 12.4% had a female householder with no husband present, 5.1% had a male householder with no wife present, and 39.7% were non-families. 32.6% of all households were made up of individuals, and 17.1% had someone living alone who was 65 years of age or older. The average household size was 2.27 and the average family size was 2.82.

The median age in the village was 44.3 years. 18.4% of residents were under the age of 18; 7.5% were between the ages of 18 and 24; 25% were from 25 to 44; 30% were from 45 to 64; and 19.1% were 65 years of age or older. The gender makeup of the village was 46.2% male and 53.8% female.

=== 2000 census ===
As of the census of 2000, there were 1,329 people, 609 households, and 386 families living in the village. The population density was 2,392.2 inhabitants per square mile (923.6/km^{2}). There were 685 housing units at an average density of 1,233.0 per square mile (476.1/km^{2}). The racial makeup of the village was 98.95% White, 0.23% from other races, and 0.83% from two or more races. Hispanic or Latino of any race were 0.30% of the population.

There were 609 households, out of which 23.8% had children under the age of 18 living with them, 47.9% were married couples living together, 11.7% had a female householder with no husband present, and 36.5% were non-families. 33.5% of all households were made up of individuals, and 20.2% had someone living alone who was 65 years of age or older. The average household size was 2.18 and the average family size was 2.76.

In the village, the population was spread out, with 18.8% under the age of 18, 7.4% from 18 to 24, 22.0% from 25 to 44, 26.4% from 45 to 64, and 25.4% who were 65 years of age or older. The median age was 46 years. For every 100 females, there were 82.1 males. For every 100 females age 18 and over, there were 81.6 males.

The median income for a household in the village was $28,929, and the median income for a family was $36,691. Males had a median income of $32,167 versus $20,972 for females. The per capita income for the village was $16,052. About 12.3% of families and 13.9% of the population were below the poverty line, including 20.6% of those under age 18 and 11.2% of those age 65 or over.

== Education ==
Public education in the village of Tiltonsville is provided by the Buckeye Local School District. Tiltonsville has a public library, a branch of the Public Library of Steubenville and Jefferson County.

== Popular culture ==
The Ohio Valley poet James Wright mentions Tiltonsville in his poem, "Autumn Begins in Martins Ferry, Ohio".

== See also ==
- List of cities and towns along the Ohio River
