= Smithfield Township, Jefferson County, Ohio =

Township in Ohio, US

- Township
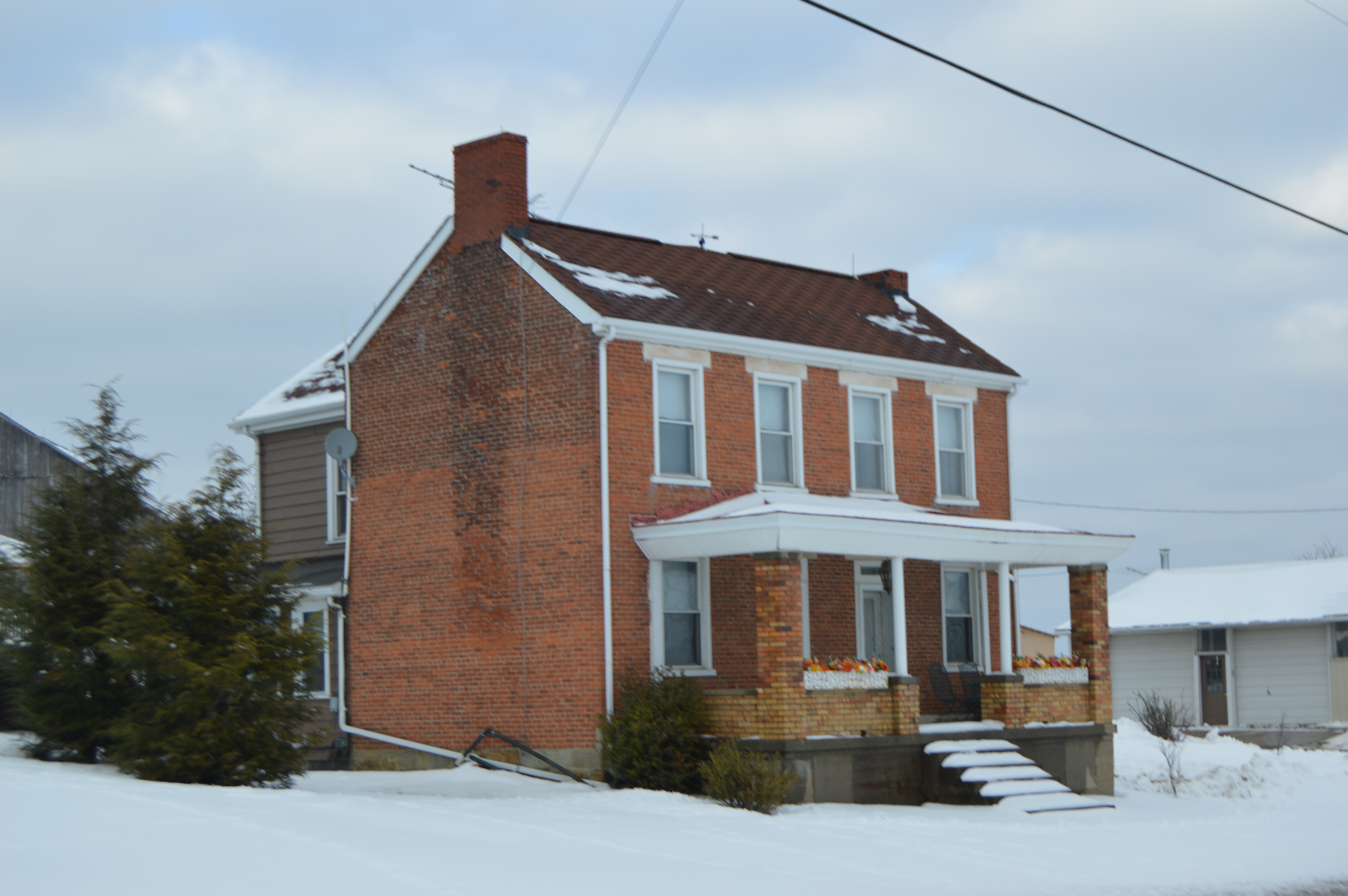
- Township farmstead in winter

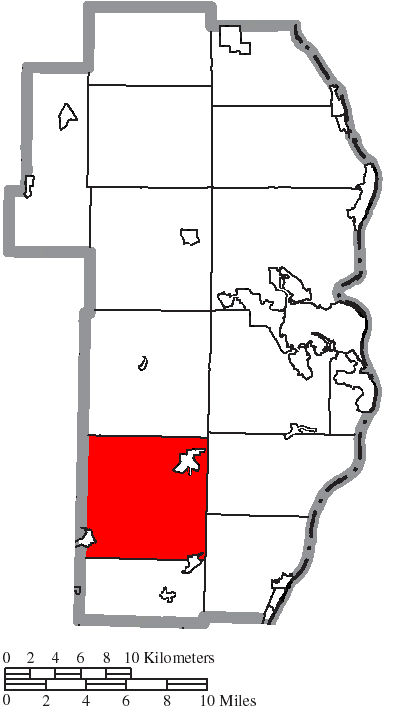
- Location of Smithfield Township in Jefferson County
- Coordinates: 40°14′45″N 80°49′8″W
- Country: United States
- State: Ohio
- County: Jefferson

Area
  - Total: 37.7 sq mi (97.6 km^{2})
  - Land: 37.5 sq mi (97.2 km^{2})
  - Water: 0.15 sq mi (0.4 km^{2})
- Elevation: 971 ft (296 m)

Population (2020)
  - Total: 3,011
  - Density: 80.2/sq mi (31.0/km^{2})
- Time zone: UTC-5 (Eastern (EST))
  - Summer (DST): UTC-4 (EDT)
- ZIP code: 43948
- Area code: 740
- FIPS code: 39-72767
- GNIS feature ID: 1086384

Smithfield Township is one of the fourteen townships of Jefferson County, Ohio, United States. The 2020 census found 3,011 people in the township.

== Geography ==
Located in the southwestern part of the county, it borders the following townships:

- Wayne Township - north
- Wells Township - northeast
- Warren Township - southeast
- Mount Pleasant Township - south
- Short Creek Township, Harrison County - southwest
- Green Township, Harrison County - northwest

Several populated places are located in Smithfield Township:

- Part of the village of Adena, in the southwest
- Part of the village of Dillonvale, in the southeast
- The village of Smithfield, in the northeast
- The unincorporated community of Greentown, in the east
- The unincorporated community of Piney Fork, in the center

== Name and history ==
Smithfield Township was founded in 1805. It takes its name from the village of Smithfield, which predates its establishment.

It is the only Smithfield Township statewide.

== Government ==
The township is governed by a three-member board of trustees, who are elected in November of odd-numbered years to a four-year term beginning on the following January 1. Two are elected in the year after the presidential election and one is elected in the year before it. There is also an elected township fiscal officer, who serves a four-year term beginning on April 1 of the year after the election, which is held in November of the year before the presidential election. Vacancies in the fiscal officership or on the board of trustees are filled by the remaining trustees.
