= Warren Township, Jefferson County, Ohio =

Township in Ohio, US

- Township
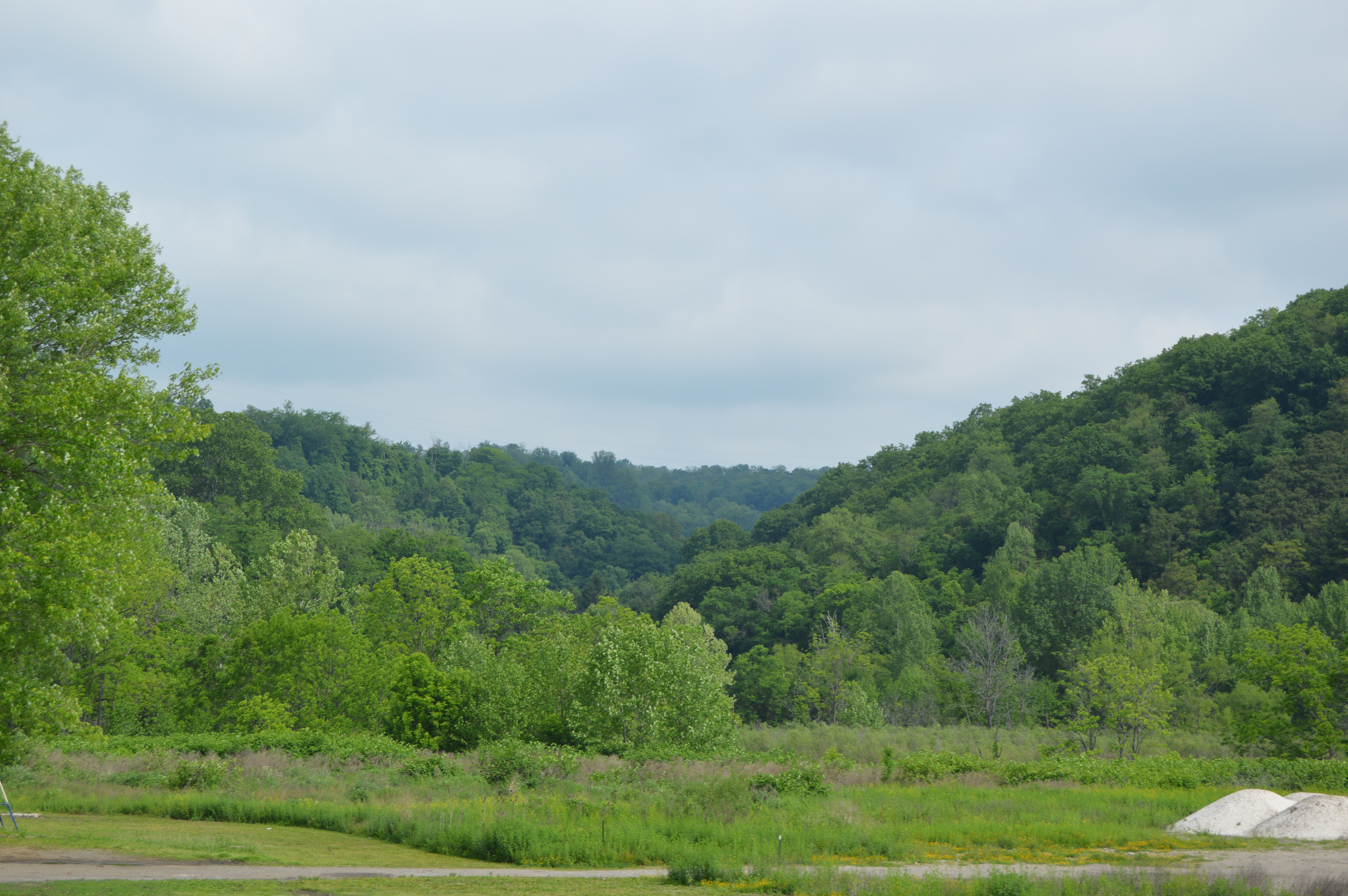
- Wooded hills west of Rayland

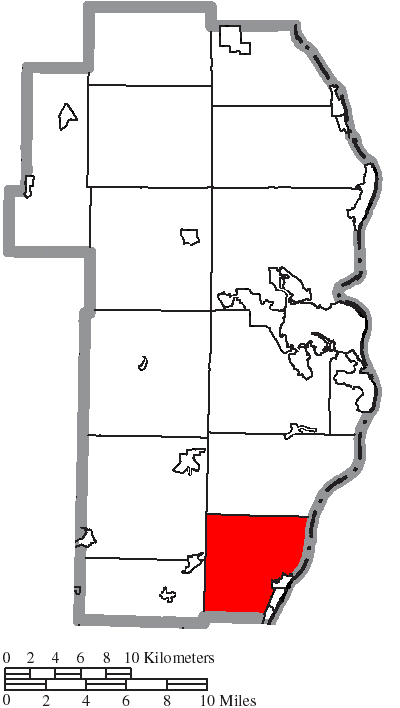
- Location of Warren Township in Jefferson County
- Coordinates: 40°11′4″N 80°42′16″W
- Country: United States
- State: Ohio
- County: Jefferson

Area
  - Total: 23.2 sq mi (60.2 km^{2})
  - Land: 23.2 sq mi (60.2 km^{2})
  - Water: 0 sq mi (0.0 km^{2})
- Elevation: 790 ft (240 m)

Population (2020)
  - Total: 3,832
  - Density: 165/sq mi (63.7/km^{2})
- Time zone: UTC-5 (Eastern (EST))
  - Summer (DST): UTC-4 (EDT)
- FIPS code: 39-80878
- GNIS feature ID: 1086388

Warren Township is one of the fourteen townships of Jefferson County, Ohio, United States. The 2020 census found 3,832 people in the township.

== Geography ==
Located in the southeastern corner of the county along the Ohio River, it borders the following townships:

- Wells Township - north
- Pease Township, Belmont County - south
- Mount Pleasant Township - southwest
- Smithfield Township - northwest

West Virginia lies across the Ohio River to the east: Brooke County to the northeast, and Ohio County to the southeast.

Three villages are located along the Ohio River in southeastern Warren Township:

- Part of Yorkville, farthest downstream
- Tiltonsville, in the middle
- Rayland, farthest upstream

Three unincorporated communities:

- Connorville (a census-designated place), in the center of the township
- Hopewell, in the northern part of the township
- Rush Run, along the Ohio River

== Name and history ==
Warren Township was founded in 1802.

It is one of five Warren Townships statewide.

== Government ==
The township is governed by a three-member board of trustees, who are elected in November of odd-numbered years to a four-year term beginning on the following January 1. Two are elected in the year after the presidential election and one is elected in the year before it. There is also an elected township fiscal officer, who serves a four-year term beginning on April 1 of the year after the election, which is held in November of the year before the presidential election. Vacancies in the fiscal officership or on the board of trustees are filled by the remaining trustees.
