= Smithfield, Ohio =

- Unincorporated place
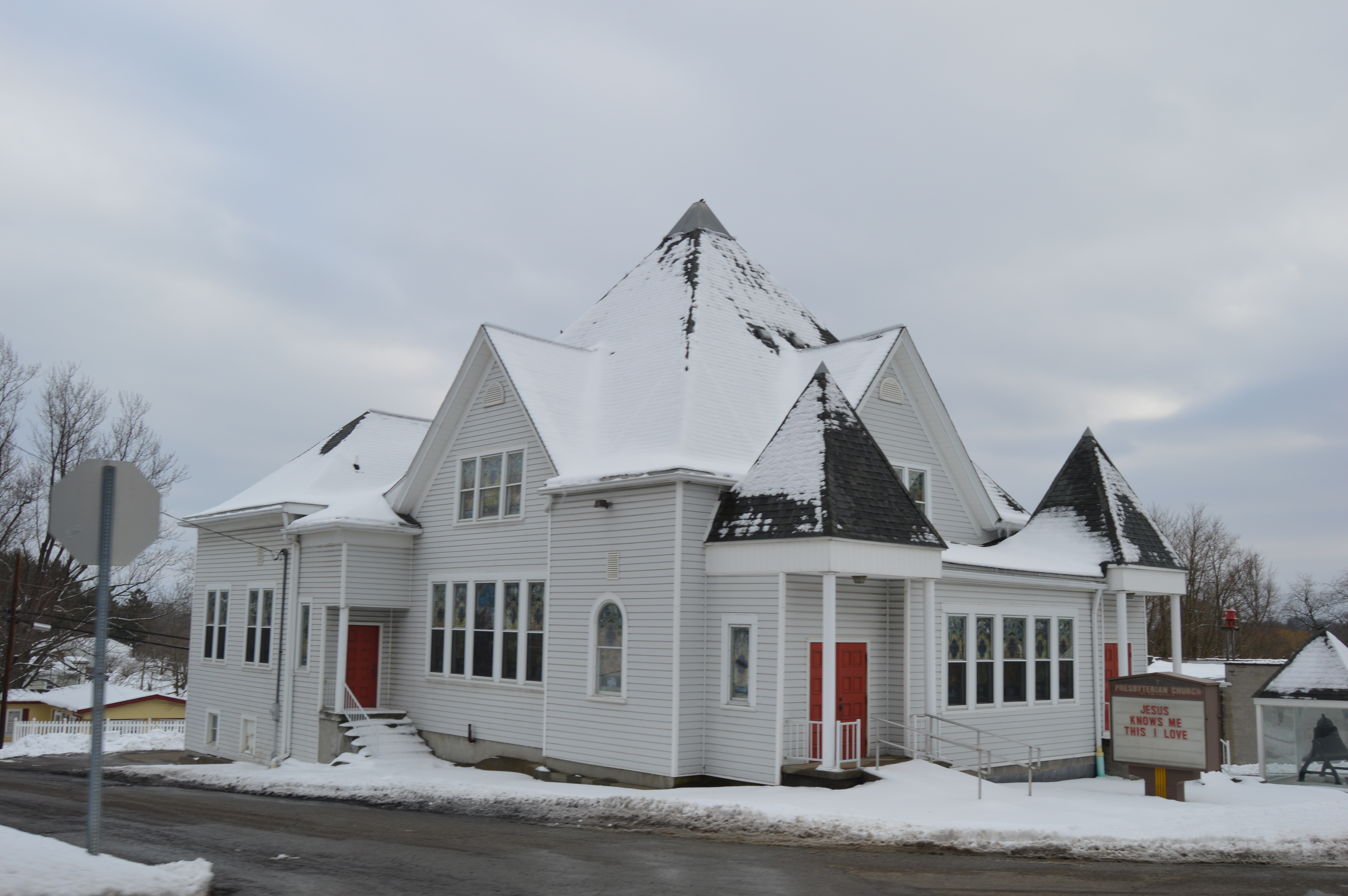
- Smithfield Presbyterian Church

- Location within Ohio Location within the United States
- Coordinates: 40°16′18″N 80°46′38″W
- Country: United States
- State: Ohio
- County: Jefferson
- Township: Smithfield
- Platted: 1803
- Dissolved: November 5, 2019

Area
  - Total: 0.95 sq mi (2.45 km^{2})
  - Land: 0.95 sq mi (2.45 km^{2})
  - Water: 0 sq mi (0.00 km^{2})
- Elevation: 1,253 ft (382 m)

Population (2010)
  - Total: 869
  - Estimate (2019): 790
  - Density: 836/sq mi (322.6/km^{2})
- Time zone: UTC-5 (Eastern (EST))
  - Summer (DST): UTC-4 (EDT)
- ZIP code: 43948
- Area code: 740
- FIPS code: 39-72760
- GNIS feature ID: 2806430

Smithfield is an unincorporated community in Jefferson County, Ohio, United States. The population was 869 at the 2010 census. It is part of the Weirton–Steubenville metropolitan area. Formerly an incorporated village, Smithfield voted to dissolve itself in 2019.

== History ==
Smithfield was platted in 1803. A post office called Smithfield has been in operation since 1814.

Confederate general John Hunt Morgan traveled through Smithfield during the 1863 Morgan's Raid on his way to defeat at the Battle of Salineville in the American Civil War.

Due to its location above the eastern Ohio River floodplain, the Wabash Pittsburgh Terminal Railway was constructed through Smithfield by George Jay Gould in the early 1900s. From 1908 to 1964, it was operated by the Pittsburgh and West Virginia Railway. Smithfield had a local rail yard largely built to service the extensive coal fields surrounding the town. The Smithfield Station passenger and freight depot, located on Weems Road (CR-25) just east of the village center, was demolished in 2015. The railroad line passed Smithfield between the Hunter and Oliver tunnels.

In 2016, Smithfield survived an initiative to dissolve the village into surrounding Smithfield Township. However, Smithfield voted to dissolve itself in November 2019.

== Geography ==
According to the United States Census Bureau, the village has a total area of 0.95 square miles (2.46 km^{2}), all land.

== Demographics ==
Historical population
Census	Pop.	Note	%±
1820	243		—
1830	386		58.8%
1850	425		—
1870	515		—
1880	559		8.5%
1890	639		14.3%
1900	503		−21.3%
1910	589		17.1%
1920	620		5.3%
1930	1,023		65.0%
1940	1,169		14.3%
1950	1,255		7.4%
1960	1,312		4.5%
1970	1,245		−5.1%
1980	1,308		5.1%
1990	722		−44.8%
2000	867		20.1%
2010	869		0.2%
U.S. Decennial Census

=== 2010 census ===
As of the census of 2010, there were 869 people, 362 households, and 234 families living in the village. The population density was 914.7 inhabitants per square mile (353.2/km^{2}). There were 437 housing units at an average density of 460.0 per square mile (177.6/km^{2}). The racial makeup of the village was 86.7% White, 11.3% African American, 0.1% Pacific Islander, 0.3% from other races, and 1.6% from two or more races. Hispanic or Latino of any race were 1.2% of the population.

There were 362 households, of which 28.7% had children under the age of 18 living with them, 48.3% were married couples living together, 10.2% had a female householder with no husband present, 6.1% had a male householder with no wife present, and 35.4% were non-families. 30.9% of all households were made up of individuals, and 14.6% had someone living alone who was 65 years of age or older. The average household size was 2.35 and the average family size was 2.90.

The median age in the village was 42.9 years. 22.4% of residents were under the age of 18; 7.2% were between the ages of 18 and 24; 23.3% were from 25 to 44; 29.8% were from 45 to 64; and 17.3% were 65 years of age or older. The gender makeup of the village was 47.5% male and 52.5% female.

=== 2000 census ===
As of the census of 2000, there were 867 people, 358 households, and 230 families living in the village. The population density was 904.5 inhabitants per square mile (349.2/km^{2}). There were 405 housing units at an average density of 422.5 per square mile (163.1/km^{2}). The racial makeup of the village was 86.97% White, 9.80% African American, 0.12% Native American, 0.35% from other races, and 2.77% from two or more races. Hispanic or Latino of any race were 0.23% of the population.

There were 358 households, out of which 27.4% had children under the age of 18 living with them, 48.9% were married couples living together, 11.5% had a female householder with no husband present, and 35.5% were non-families. 32.1% of all households were made up of individuals, and 15.6% had someone living alone who was 65 years of age or older. The average household size was 2.34 and the average family size was 2.90.

In the village, the population was spread out, with 24.1% under the age of 18, 6.0% from 18 to 24, 26.1% from 25 to 44, 24.0% from 45 to 64, and 19.8% who were 65 years of age or older. The median age was 40 years. For every 100 females there were 90.5 males. For every 100 females age 18 and over, there were 82.8 males.

The median income for a household in the village was $25,179, and the median income for a family was $30,833. Males had a median income of $33,500 versus $17,813 for females. The per capita income for the village was $13,734. About 21.4% of families and 28.8% of the population were below the poverty line, including 37.0% of those under age 18 and 19.1% of those age 65 or over.

== Education ==
Public education in the village of Smithfield is provided by the Buckeye Local School District.

== Notable people ==
- John Domenick, member of the Ohio House of Representatives
- Samuel Grimshaw, Medal Of Honor recipient
- William Sharon, United States Senator from Nevada
- James Sutherland, Wisconsin State Senator
- W. E. Clyde Todd, Ornithologist
