= Dillonvale, Jefferson County, Ohio =

Dillonvale, Ohio
- Village
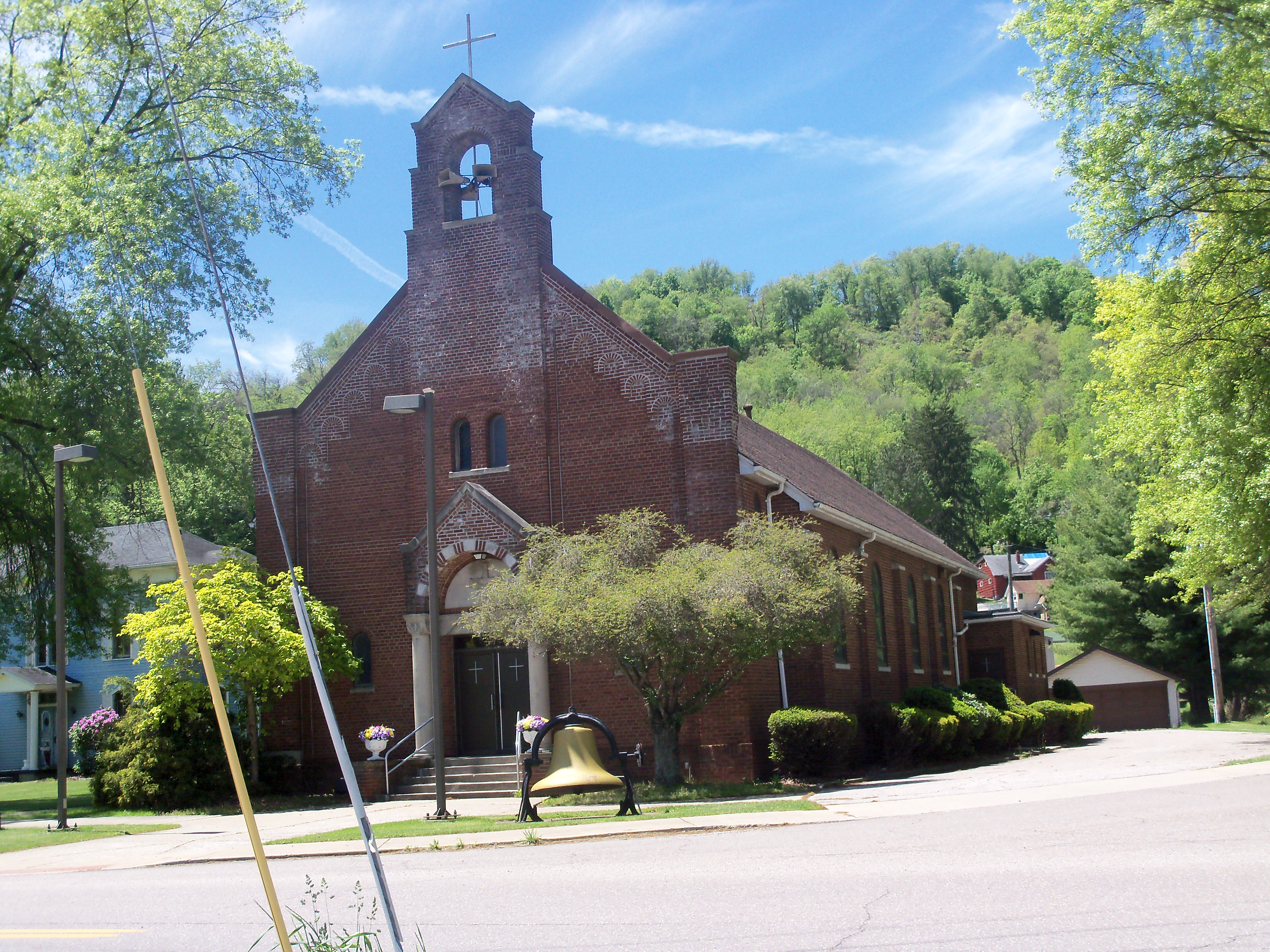
- Saint Adalbert Roman Catholic Church on the corner of State Routes 150 and 152

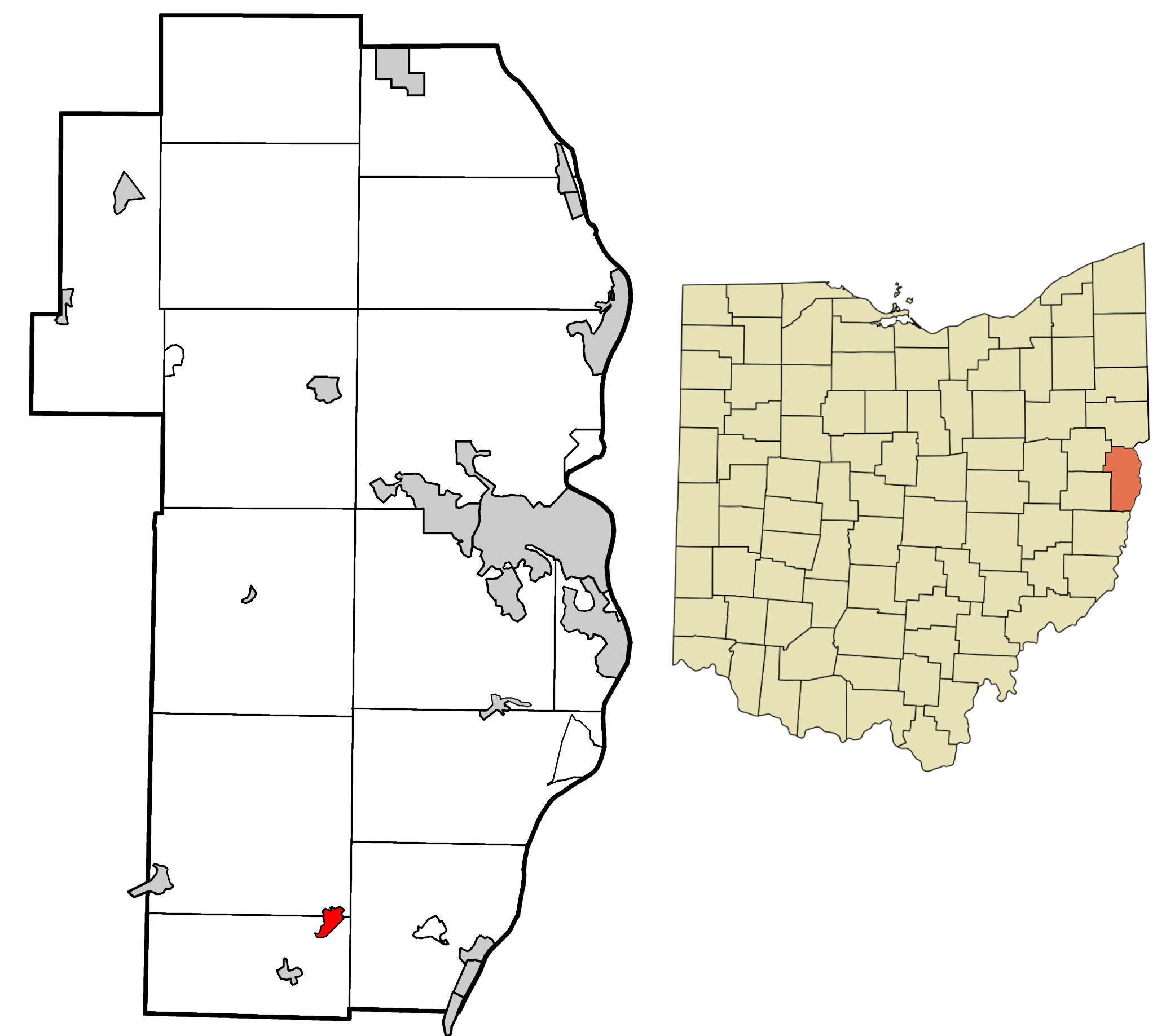
- Location of Dillonvale in Jefferson County, Ohio

- Location within Ohio Location within the United States
- Coordinates: 40°11′55″N 80°46′32″W
- Country: United States
- State: Ohio
- County: Jefferson
- Townships: Mount Pleasant, Smithfield

Area
  - Total: 0.39 sq mi (1.02 km^{2})
  - Land: 0.39 sq mi (1.00 km^{2})
  - Water: 0.0077 sq mi (0.02 km^{2})
- Elevation: 774 ft (236 m)

Population (2020)
  - Total: 589
  - Estimate (2023): 599
  - Density: 1,525.4/sq mi (588.96/km^{2})
- Time zone: UTC-5 (Eastern (EST))
  - Summer (DST): UTC-4 (EDT)
- ZIP code: 43917
- Area code: 740
- FIPS code: 39-22022
- GNIS feature ID: 2398726

Dillonvale is a village in Jefferson County, Ohio, United States. The population was 589 at the 2020 census. It is part of the Weirton–Steubenville metropolitan area.

== History ==
Dillonvale was originally known as Annadelphia, and under the latter name was laid out in 1816. Nothing much became of the town until the Wheeling and Lake Erie Railway was built through that territory in 1889, at which time a new plat was made and the new names of Dillon, and later Dillonvale, were adopted.

== Geography ==
According to the United States Census Bureau, the village has a total area of 0.40 square miles (1.04 km^{2}), of which 0.39 square miles (1.01 km^{2}) is land and 0.01 square miles (0.03 km^{2}) is water.

== Demographics ==
Historical population
Census	Pop.	Note	%±
1910	1,519		—
1920	1,643		8.2%
1930	1,434		−12.7%
1940	1,652		15.2%
1950	1,407		−14.8%
1960	1,232		−12.4%
1970	1,095		−11.1%
1980	912		−16.7%
1990	857		−6.0%
2000	781		−8.9%
2010	665		−14.9%
2020	589		−11.4%
2023 (est.)	599		1.7%
U.S. Decennial Census

=== 2010 census ===
As of the census of 2010, there were 665 people, 294 households, and 187 families living in the village. The population density was 1,705.1 inhabitants per square mile (658.3/km^{2}). There were 357 housing units at an average density of 915.4 per square mile (353.4/km^{2}). The racial makeup of the village was 98.0% White, 0.9% African American, 0.2% Native American, 0.2% from other races, and 0.8% from two or more races. Hispanic or Latino of any race were 0.2% of the population.

There were 294 households, of which 26.5% had children under the age of 18 living with them, 43.5% were married couples living together, 14.6% had a female householder with no husband present, 5.4% had a male householder with no wife present, and 36.4% were non-families. 31.3% of all households were made up of individuals, and 18.4% had someone living alone who was 65 years of age or older. The average household size was 2.23 and the average family size was 2.78.

The median age in the village was 43.4 years. 20.2% of residents were under the age of 18; 8.1% were between the ages of 18 and 24; 23.7% were from 25 to 44; 27.7% were from 45 to 64; and 20.5% were 65 years of age or older. The gender makeup of the village was 47.2% male and 52.8% female.

=== 2000 census ===
As of the census of 2000, there were 781 people, 339 households, and 234 families living in the village. The population density was 1,889.6 inhabitants per square mile (729.6/km^{2}). There were 392 housing units at an average density of 948.4 per square mile (366.2/km^{2}). The racial makeup of the village was 98.46% White, 0.51% African American, 0.13% Asian, and 0.90% from two or more races.

There were 339 households, out of which 25.7% had children under the age of 18 living with them, 48.1% were married couples living together, 13.9% had a female householder with no husband present, and 30.7% were non-families. 28.6% of all households were made up of individuals, and 18.0% had someone living alone who was 65 years of age or older. The average household size was 2.30 and the average family size was 2.74.

In the village, the population was spread out, with 20.2% under the age of 18, 7.6% from 18 to 24, 25.1% from 25 to 44, 22.0% from 45 to 64, and 25.1% who were 65 years of age or older. The median age was 43 years. For every 100 females there were 87.7 males. For every 100 females age 18 and over, there were 83.8 males.

The median income for a household in the village was $28,636, and the median income for a family was $34,625. Males had a median income of $29,500 versus $19,615 for females. The per capita income for the village was $14,446. About 8.5% of families and 11.9% of the population were below the poverty line, including 13.2% of those under age 18 and 10.3% of those age 65 or over.

== Education ==
Public education in the village of Dillonvale is provided by the Buckeye Local School District. Dillonvale has a public library, a branch of the Public Library of Steubenville and Jefferson County.
