= Rayland, Ohio =

- Village
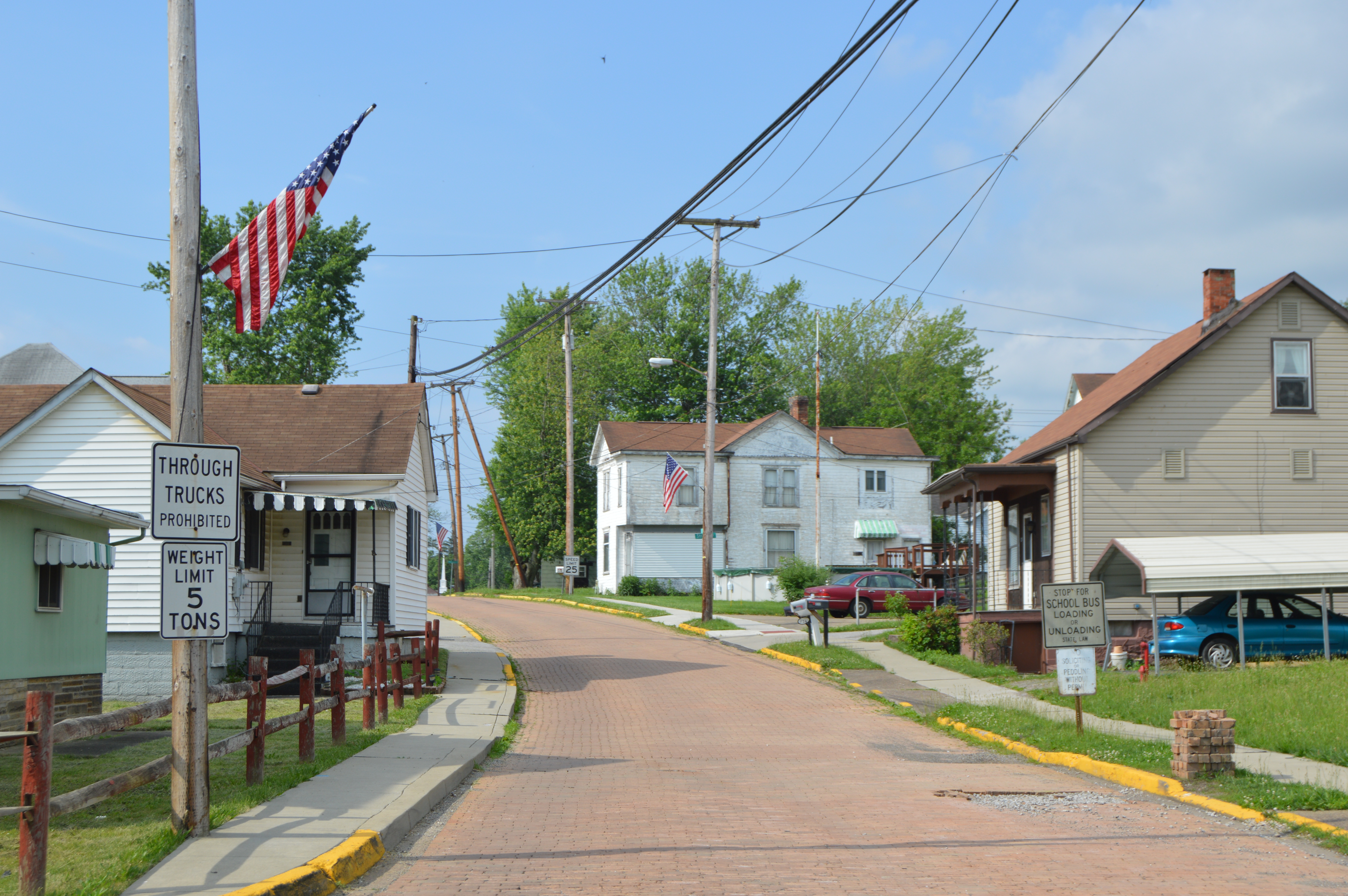
- Northern end of Main Street

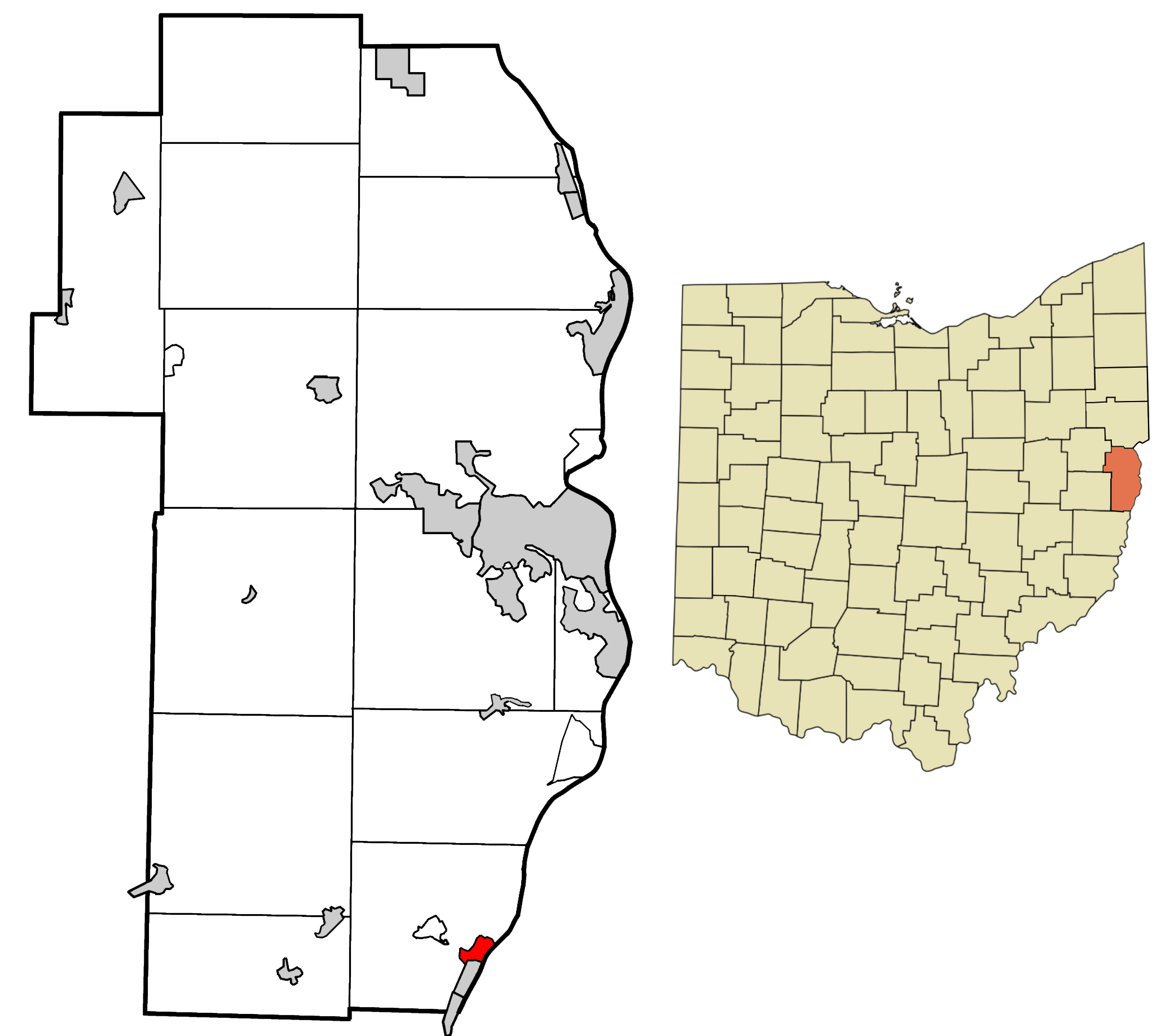
- Location of Rayland in Jefferson County, Ohio

- Location within Ohio Location within the United States
- Coordinates: 40°11′03″N 80°41′28″W
- Country: United States
- State: Ohio
- County: Jefferson
- Township: Warren

Area
  - Total: 0.50 sq mi (1.29 km^{2})
  - Land: 0.47 sq mi (1.22 km^{2})
  - Water: 0.027 sq mi (0.07 km^{2})
- Elevation: 673 ft (205 m)

Population (2020)
  - Total: 395
  - Density: 839/sq mi (324/km^{2})
- Time zone: UTC-5 (Eastern (EST))
  - Summer (DST): UTC-4 (EDT)
- ZIP code: 43943
- Area code: 740
- FIPS code: 39-65662
- GNIS feature ID: 2399048

Rayland is a village in southeastern Jefferson County, Ohio, United States, along the Ohio River. The population was 395 at the 2020 census. It is part of the Weirton–Steubenville metropolitan area.

== History ==
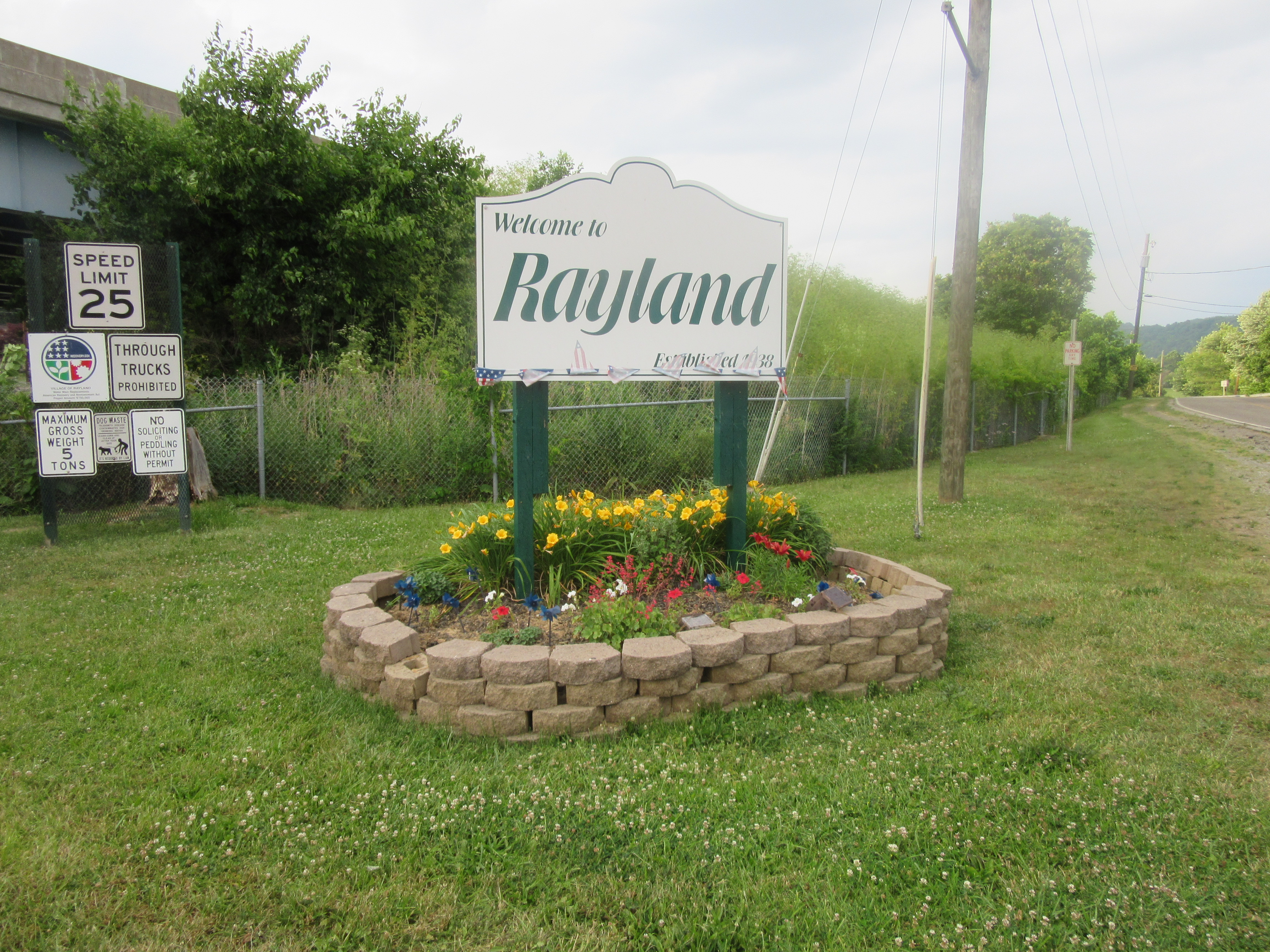
Welcome sign at southern end of village

Rayland was originally called Portland Station. A post office called Portland Station was established in 1871 giving the village its name. The village name was changed to Rayland in 1928. Rayland incorporated as a village in 1938. Rayland was once of the largest port towns on the river during its heyday as Portland Station.

The Stringer Stone House, also known as the John B. Bayless House, was a historic stone mansion located at 224 Warren Avenue in Rayland, Ohio. The house was added to the National Register of Historic Places on July 10, 1974. It was destroyed by fire in 1982. The house was built in 1836 by John Brown Bayless, an abolitionist from Maryland. The interior was decorated with murals by an Italian artist, including a waterfall beside the stairs, William Penn's treaty with the Indians, a castle in England, and a gristmill and mill workers. In 1860 it was purchased by Jefferson D. Stringer. Rutherford B. Hayes visited it in 1876, during his term as governor of Ohio.

Bayless constructed a three-and-a-half-story building out of gray sandstone. Much about the design was unusual: he placed the main entrances on the second story, the stone chimneys on each end consisted of attached pairs, and the house faced away from the road. The largest exception to the house's almost complete stone construction was a small wooden porch surrounding the front entrance; it was accessed by a set of stone steps.

== Geography ==
According to the United States Census Bureau, the village has a total area of 0.50 square miles (1.29 km^{2}), of which 0.47 square miles (1.22 km^{2}) is land and 0.03 square miles (0.08 km^{2}) is water.

== Demographics ==
Historical population
Census	Pop.	Note	%±
1940	681		—
1950	726		6.6%
1960	694		−4.4%
1970	617		−11.1%
1980	566		−8.3%
1990	490		−13.4%
2000	434		−11.4%
2010	417		−3.9%
2020	395		−5.3%
U.S. Decennial Census

=== 2020 census ===
As of the census of 2020, there were 389 people, 173 households, and 112 families living in the village. The population density was 887.2 inhabitants per square mile (342.5/km^{2}). There were 188 housing units at an average density of 400.0 per square mile (154.4/km^{2}). The racial makeup of the village was 99.01% White, 0.9% African American, 0.0% Native American, 0.0% from other races, and 0.0% from two or more races.

There were 173 households, of which 30.1% had children under the age of 18 living with them, 48.0% were married couples living together, 14.5% had a female householder with no husband present, 6.9% had a male householder with no wife present, and 30.6% were non-families. 23.1% of all households were made up of individuals, and 8.7% had someone living alone who was 65 years of age or older. The average household size was 2.41 and the average family size was 2.79.

The median age in the village was 43.7 years. 22.8% of residents were under the age of 18; 4.1% were between the ages of 18 and 24; 25.1% were from 25 to 44; 30% were from 45 to 64; and 18% were 65 years of age or older. The gender makeup of the village was 48.9% male and 51.1% female.

=== 2000 census ===
As of the census of 2000, there were 434 people, 175 households, and 134 families living in the village. The population density was 998.9 inhabitants per square mile (385.7/km^{2}). There were 198 housing units at an average density of 455.7 per square mile (175.9/km^{2}). The racial makeup of the village was 98.9% White, 1.1% African American, 0.0% Asian, 0.0% from other races, and 0.0% from two or more races. Hispanic or Latino of any race were 0.0% of the population.

There were 175 households, out of which 26.9% had children under the age of 18 living with them, 57.1% were married couples living together, 14.3% had a female householder with no husband present, and 23.4% were non-families. 20.6% of all households were made up of individuals, and 13.7% had someone living alone who was 65 years of age or older. The average household size was 2.48 and the average family size was 2.84.

In the village, the population was spread out, with 22.1% under the age of 18, 7.8% from 18 to 24, 23.3% from 25 to 44, 23.0% from 45 to 64, and 23.7% who were 65 years of age or older. The median age was 43 years. For every 100 females, there were 80.8 males. For every 100 females age 18 and over, there were 87.8 males.

The median income for a household in the village was $35,300, and the median income for a family was $77,000. Males had a median income of $40,500 versus $17,531 for females. The per capita income for the village was $14,382. About 17.1% of families and 23.3% of the population were below the poverty line, including 40.0% of those under age 18 and 9.6% of those age 65 or over.

== Education ==
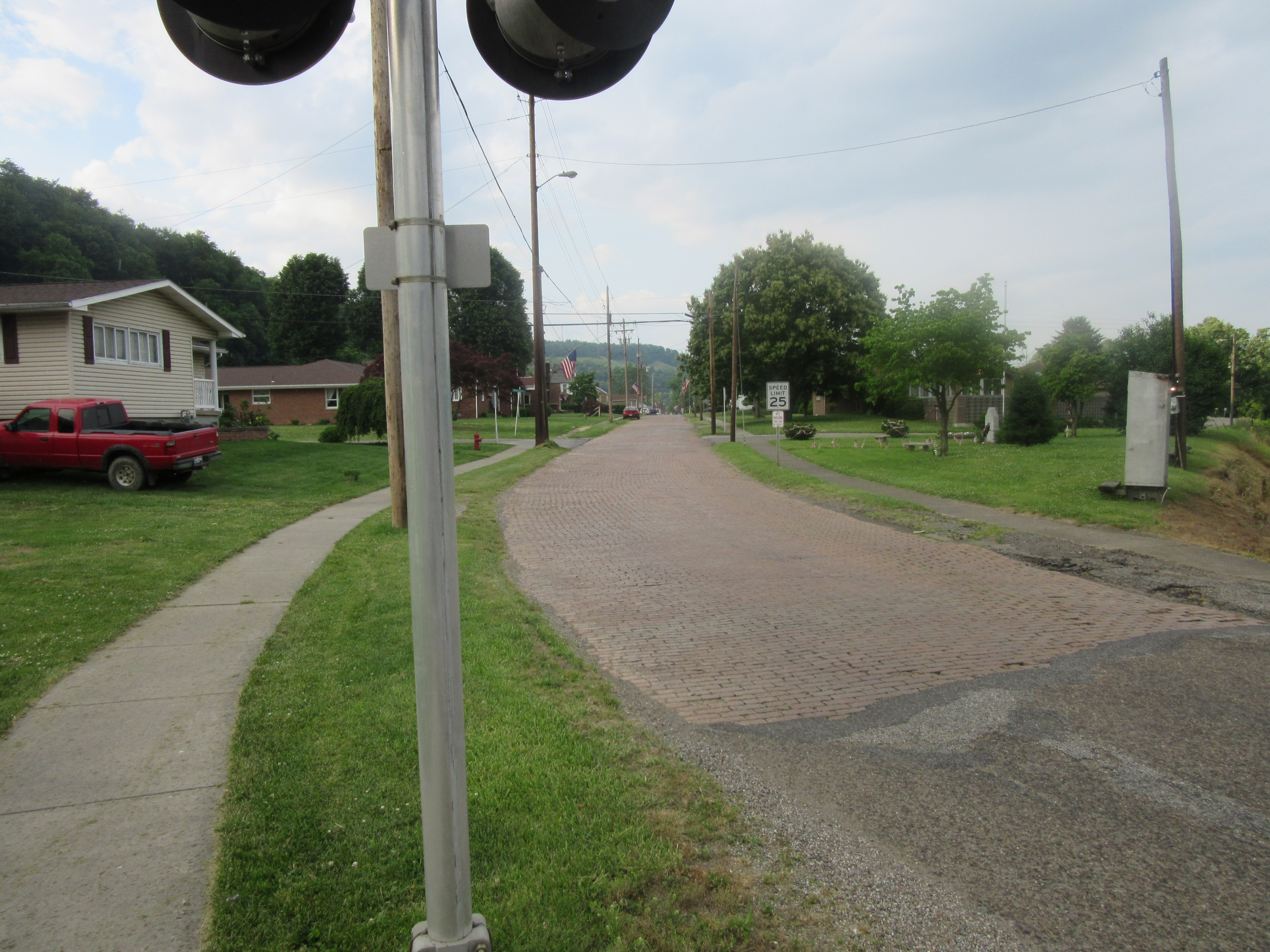
South end of Main Street in Rayland

Public education in the village of Rayland is provided by the Buckeye Local School District. The current schools serving Rayland are:

- Buckeye South Elementary School – grades K-5 (located in nearby Tiltonsville)
- Buckeye Local Junior High School – grades 6–8 (located in nearby Connorville)
- Buckeye Local High School – grades 9–12 (located in nearby Connorville)

== Notable person ==
- Bill Mazeroski, Major League Baseball Hall of Fame second baseman for the Pittsburgh Pirates

== See also ==
- List of cities and towns along the Ohio River
