= National Register of Historic Places listings in Jefferson County, Ohio =

Location of Jefferson County in Ohio

This is a list of the National Register of Historic Places listings in Jefferson County, Ohio.

This is intended to be a complete list of the properties on the National Register of Historic Places in Jefferson County, Ohio, United States. The locations of National Register properties for which the latitude and longitude coordinates are included below, may be seen in an online map.

There are 26 properties and districts listed on the National Register in the county, including two National Historic Landmarks. Another two properties were once listed but have been removed.

This National Park Service list is complete through NPS recent listings posted February 27, 2026.

== Current listings ==
	Name on the Register	Image	Date listed	Location	City or town	Description
1	Bantam Ridge School	Bantam Ridge School	October 1, 1981 (#81000442)	Bantam Ridge Rd., southwest of Wintersville; 40°21′34″N 80°43′52″W	Cross Creek Township	
2	Ann E. Lewis Bernhard House	Ann E. Lewis Bernhard House	April 28, 2005 (#05000342)	42 E. Main St. 40°13′06″N 80°52′20″W	Adena	
3	Carnegie Library of Steubenville	Carnegie Library of Steubenville	September 16, 1992 (#92001160)	407 S. 4th St. 40°21′19″N 80°37′06″W	Steubenville	
4	Central High School	Central High School	March 17, 1987 (#87000471)	110 Steuben Ave. 40°19′11″N 80°36′31″W	Mingo Junction	
5	Central Public School	Central Public School	March 17, 1987 (#87000472)	109 Saint Clair Ave. 40°19′09″N 80°36′29″W	Mingo Junction	
6	Commercial Street Historic District	Commercial Street Historic District	March 17, 1987 (#87000468)	Roughly Commercial St. between McLister and Highland Aves., May, and railroad tracks 40°19′14″N 80°36′24″W	Mingo Junction	
7	Federal Land Office	Federal Land Office	April 3, 1973 (#73001482)	Corner of 3rd and Adams St. 40°21′29″N 80°36′51″W	Steubenville	Moved onto grounds of Fort Steuben
8	First Methodist Episcopal-Holy Trinity Greek Orthodox Church	First Methodist Episcopal-Holy Trinity Greek Orthodox Church	March 2, 2006 (#06000093)	300 S. 4th St. 40°21′23″N 80°37′00″W	Steubenville	
9	Friends Meetinghouse	Friends Meetinghouse	November 10, 1970 (#70000504)	Near State Route 150; 40°10′25″N 80°48′10″W	Mount Pleasant	
10	Hamilton-Ickes House	Hamilton-Ickes House	November 26, 1980 (#80003106)	North of Adena on State Route 10; 40°13′47″N 80°52′00″W	Smithfield Township	
11	Hodgen's Cemetery Mound	Hodgen's Cemetery Mound	September 25, 1975 (#75001443)	In Hodgen's Cemetery, off Walden Ave. 40°10′28″N 80°41′41″W	Tiltonsville	
12	Independent School District No. 2 Building	Independent School District No. 2 Building	July 10, 1986 (#86001569)	64520 State Route 213, north of Steubenville; 40°25′05″N 80°39′26″W	Island Creek Township	
13	Benjamin Lundy House	Benjamin Lundy House	May 30, 1974 (#74001537)	Union and Market Sts. 40°10′29″N 80°48′13″W	Mount Pleasant	
14	Market Street Bridge	Market Street Bridge	March 21, 2019 (#100003517)	West Virginia Route 2 spur and Market Street; 40°21′32″N 80°36′41″W	Steubenville	Extends into Brooke County, West Virginia
15	Market Street Section, Retaining Wall and Water Trough	Market Street Section, Retaining Wall and Water Trough	October 8, 1992 (#92001353)	Old Market St. between Market St. off ramp and Lawson Ave. 40°21′47″N 80°37′26″W	Steubenville	
16	Mount Pleasant Historic District	Mount Pleasant Historic District	June 28, 1974 (#74001536)	Roughly bounded by Union Street alleys, Cemetery St., and Market St. 40°10′28″N 80°47′55″W	Mount Pleasant	
17	North End Neighborhood Historic District	North End Neighborhood Historic District	October 1, 1991 (#91001486)	Roughly N. 4th St. from Dock St. to Franklin Ave. and the eastern side of the junction of Franklin and N. 5th St. 40°22′09″N 80°36′37″W	Steubenville	
18	North Hill Historic District	North Hill Historic District	March 17, 1987 (#87000469)	Bounded by Logan, George, Western, and alley west of Logan Ave. 40°19′36″N 80°36′34″W	Mingo Junction	
19	Speedway Mound	Speedway Mound	September 5, 1975 (#75001444)	Old State Route 7 at Warrenton; 40°11′29″N 80°40′35″W	Warren Township	Located above the speedway in Warrenton
20	Steubenville Commercial Historic District	Steubenville Commercial Historic District	August 21, 1986 (#86001877)	Roughly bounded by Washington, Court and 3rd, Market, and 8th and Commercial Sts. 40°21′38″N 80°36′54″W	Steubenville	
21	Steubenville Institutional and Ecclesiastical Historic District		March 6, 2026 (#100012787)	220, 227, 235, 301 N 4th Street, 255 & 301 N 5th Street, 417, 423, & 515 North Street; 40°21′46″N 80°36′52″W	Steubenville	
22	Steubenville Pottery Company Buildings	Steubenville Pottery Company Buildings	July 31, 1995 (#92001034)	County Road 44 southwest of its junction with State Route 7, north of Steubenville; 40°24′04″N 80°37′24″W	Island Creek Township	
23	Steubenville YMCA Building	Steubenville YMCA Building	June 1, 1982 (#82003601)	214 N. 4th St. 40°21′44″N 80°36′51″W	Steubenville	
24	Stringer Stone House	Stringer Stone House	July 10, 1974 (#74001538)	224 Main St., corner of Main and Warren St. 40°11′16″N 80°41′20″W	Rayland	
25	Toronto World War I Monument	Toronto World War I Monument	October 7, 2004 (#04001116)	208 Market St. at 3rd St. 40°27′56″N 80°35′59″W	Toronto	
26	Union Cemetery-Beatty Park	Union Cemetery-Beatty Park	February 27, 1987 (#86003507)	1720 W. Market St. and Lincoln Ave. 40°22′06″N 80°37′59″W	Steubenville	

== Former listings ==
	Name on the Register	Image	Date listed	Date removed	Location	City or town	Description
1	Ohio Valley Clay Company	Ohio Valley Clay Company	August 10, 1979 (#79001868)	January 31, 1995	Washington and Water Sts; 40°21′38″N 80°36′41″W	Steubenville	
2	Smithfield School	Smithfield School	October 16, 1981 (#81000440)	May 5, 1983	High St.	Smithfield	

== See also ==
- List of National Historic Landmarks in Ohio
- Listings in neighboring counties: Belmont, Brooke (WV), Carroll, Columbiana, Hancock (WV), Harrison, Ohio (WV)
- National Register of Historic Places listings in Ohio
