= Jonathan T. Updegraff =

American politician

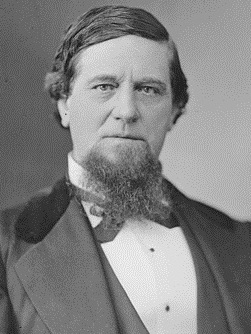

Member of the U.S. House of Representatives from Ohio
- In office March 4, 1879 – November 30, 1882
- Preceded by: James Monroe
- Succeeded by: Joseph D. Taylor
- Constituency: 18th district (1879–1881); 16th district (1881–1882)

Member of the Ohio Senate from the 22nd district
- In office January 1, 1872 – January 4, 1874
- Preceded by: Jared Dunbar
- Succeeded by: J. K. Rukenbrod

Personal details
- Born: Jonathan Taylor Updegraff; May 13, 1822 Mount Pleasant, Ohio, US
- Died: November 30, 1882 (aged 60) Mount Pleasant, Ohio, US
- Resting place: Short Creek Cemetery in Mount Pleasant
- Party: Republican
- Education: Franklin College, University of Pennsylvania at Philadelphia

Jonathan Taylor Updegraff (May 13, 1822 – November 30, 1882) was an American medical doctor, abolitionist and politician who served as a U.S. representative from Ohio from 1879 to 1882.

== Biography ==
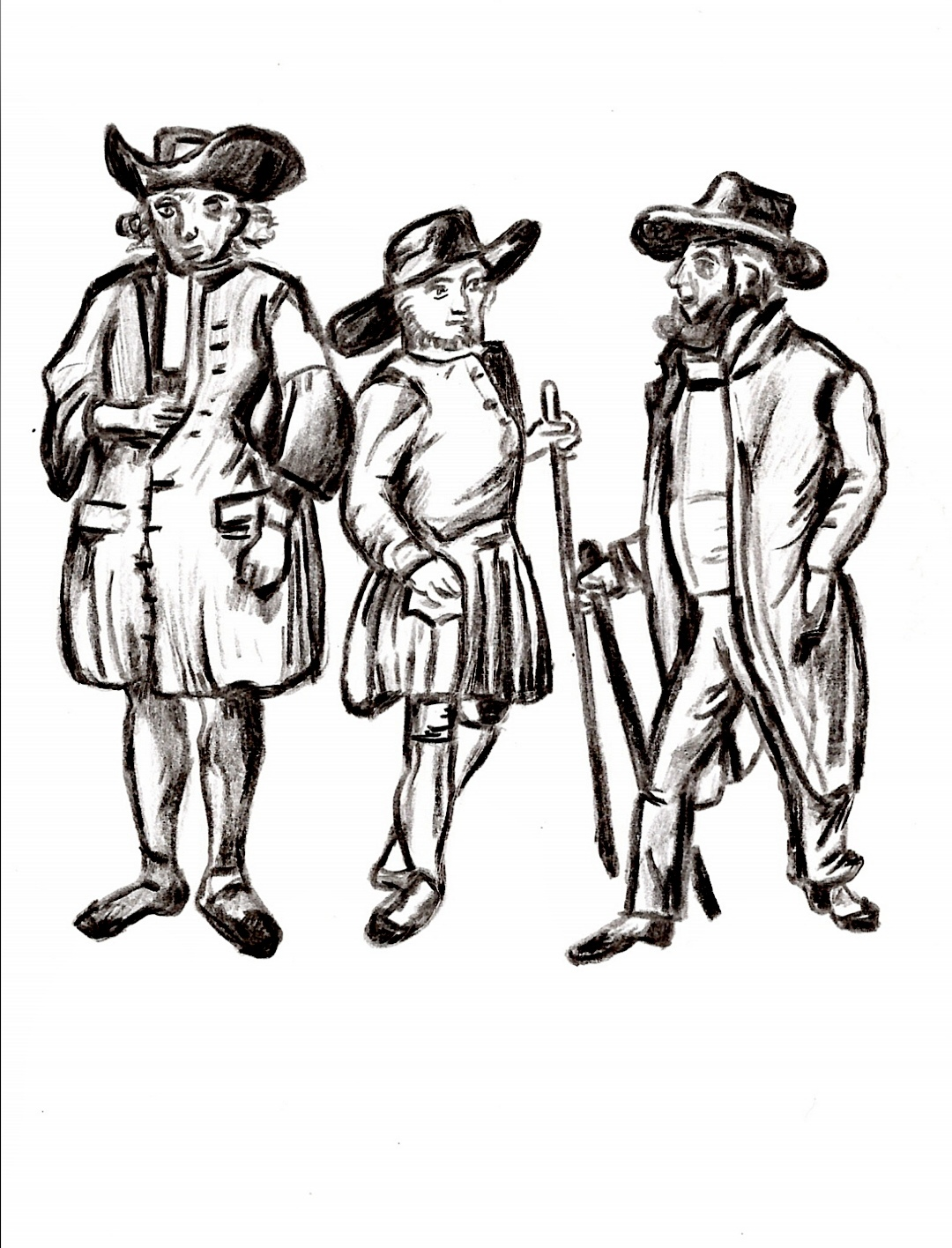
Three important members of the Op den Graeff family who were involved in the anti slavery movement and abolitionism. Left to right - Abraham op den Graeff (1649–1731), Derick op den Graeff (1646–1697) and David Benjamin Updegraff (1789–1864); sketch by Matthias Laurenz Gräff (2023)

Born near Mount Pleasant, Ohio, a descendant of the German and Dutch Op den Graeff family, Jonathan was the son of David Benjamin Updegraff, a Quaker minister, and grandson of Nathan Updegraff, a delegate to Ohio's first constitutional convention. He was also a direct descendant of Herman op den Graeff, mennonite leader of Krefeld, and his grandson Abraham op den Graeff, one of the founders of Germantown and in 1688 signer of the first protest against slavery in colonial America.

Jonathan attended private schools and Franklin College. He studied medicine. He was graduated from the University of Pennsylvania at Philadelphia in 1845 and later from medical schools in Edinburgh and Paris.

Although he practiced his profession, he devoted a large share of his time to agricultural pursuits. He served as a surgeon in the Union Army during the Civil War. He served in the State senate in 1872 and 1873, and as a Presidential elector for Grant/Wilson in 1872. He served as delegate to the Republican State convention in 1873 and to the 1876 Republican National Convention.

=== Congress ===
Updegraff was elected as a Republican to the Forty-sixth and Forty-seventh Congresses and served from March 4, 1879, until his death in Mount Pleasant, Ohio, November 30, 1882. More than 2000 people viewed his corpse at the Friends Meetinghouse. He served as chairman of the Committee on Education and Labor (Forty-seventh Congress). Updegraff had been reelected to the Forty-eighth Congress prior to his death, and his position was filled by Joseph D. Taylor.

=== Death and burial ===
He was initially interred in Updegraff Cemetery, near Mount Pleasant, Ohio but was later reinterred in Short Creek Cemetery, west of Mount Pleasant, in 1926.

=== Legacy ===
The house built by Updegraff in 1856 remains in Mount Pleasant.

In public station, whether in State or national affairs, he was respected and honored; in private life, beloved by a large and influential circle of friends. He was simple in habits and tastes, strong in his friendships, tender and devoted in his family relations, generous and confiding in his nature, firm and unyielding in his convictions of duty. He hated shams and despised pretensions, and his simple nature esteemed candor and sincerity above everything else. He regarded any labor or sacrifice for principle a religious duty, and he would go out of his way to help a friend.

— William McKinley, February 6, 1883

=== Coat of arms ===
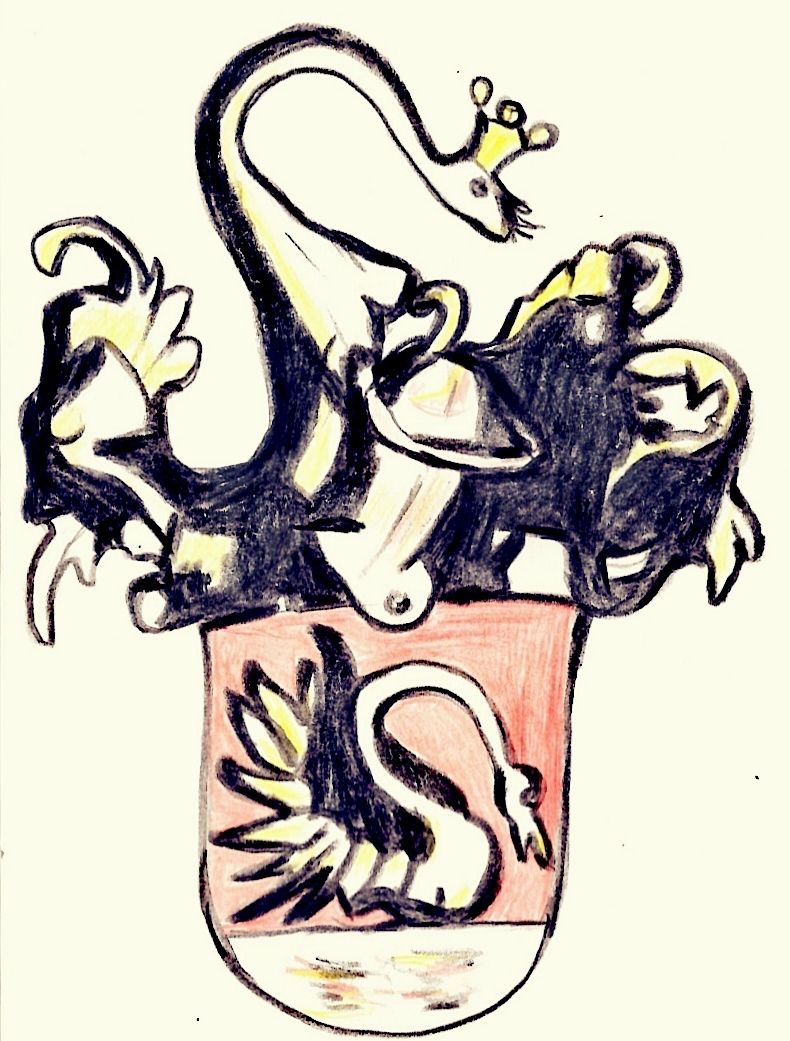
Possible, but not proven coat of arms Op den Graeff as descendants of Herman op den Graeff (Heraldic representation by Matthias Laurenz Gräff based on the Krefeld Op den Graeff stained glass window from 1630, which may depict the “Lohengrin swan” of the Kleve coat of arms in one window)

There is a reference about the Op den Graeff glass paintings of Krefeld with a description of Herman op den Graeffs possible, but not proven coat of arms was found in the estate of W. Niepoth (op den Graeff folder) in the archives of the city of Krefeld, who noted a letter dated November 17, 1935 from Richard Wolfferts to Dr Risler: Saw the Coat of Arms glass pane in the old museum: 'Herman op den Graeff und Grietgen syn housfrau' or the like. Coat of Arms - In the sign a silver swan in blue. Helmet decoration (I think): Swan growing.

== See also ==
- List of members of the United States Congress who died in office (1790–1899)

U.S. House of Representatives
Preceded by James Monroe	Member of the U.S. House of Representatives from Ohio's 18th congressional district 1879-1881	Succeeded by Addison S. McClure
Preceded by William McKinley	Member of the U.S. House of Representatives from Ohio's 16th congressional district 1881-1882	Succeeded by Joseph D. Taylor
