= Benjamin Lundy House =

United States historic place

- U.S. National Register of Historic Places
- U.S. National Historic Landmark
- U.S. National Historic Landmark District – Contributing property
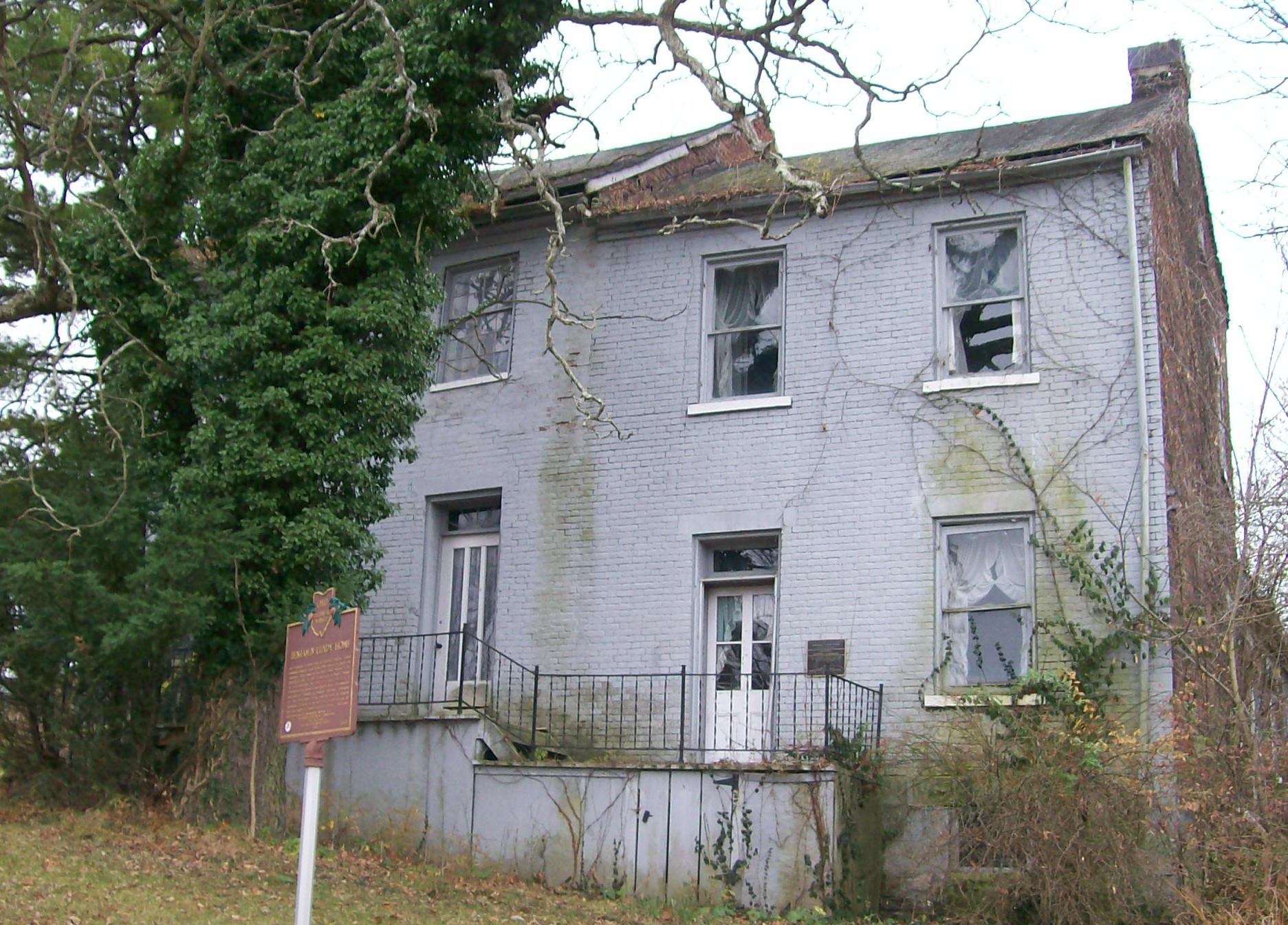
- Front of the house, 2009

- Location within Ohio Location within the United States
- Location: Union and Market Sts., Mount Pleasant, Ohio
- Coordinates: 40°10′29″N 80°48′13″W
- Area: less than one acre
- Built: c. 1812
- Part of: Mount Pleasant Historic District (ID74001536)
- NRHP reference No.: 74001537

Significant dates
- Added to NRHP: May 30, 1974
- Designated NHL: May 30, 1974
- Designated NHLDCP: June 28, 1974

The Benjamin Lundy House is a historic house at Union and Market Streets in Mount Pleasant, Ohio. It was home in 1820 to abolitionist Benjamin Lundy (1789–1839), where he established the influential anti-slavery newspaper The Genius of Universal Emancipation, one of the first anti-slavery publications in the United States. It was designated a National Historic Landmark in May 1974, and was included in the Mount Pleasant Historic District later the same year.

== Description and history ==
The Benjamin Lundy House stands at the western end of Mount Pleasant's Union Street, its principal thoroughfare. It is on the south side of the street, at an angle, on a lot between Market Street and County Road 104. It is a 2 1/2-story brick building, with a gabled roof. Its main section is three bays wide, with the entrance in the right most bay, with a recessed two-bay extension on the right side. A single-story wood-frame ell with clapboarded exterior extends to the left.

The house (either one of its duplex units, or both) was built in 1812 or 1813, and was for one year the home of Benjamin Lundy, one of the early organizing forces in the movement for the abolition of slavery in the United States. During his year of residency here, Lundy began publishing The Genius of Universal Emancipation, the first dedicated anti-slavery publication of its type. The house belonged to Dr. Isaac Parker, a leader of the local abolitionist community, from 1815 to 1843. The building is known to have served as a station on the Underground Railroad, and is one of the few known instances of a place where a free produce movement store operated. These stores refused products and profits that were based in any way on slave labor.

In late 2009 the three-story house stood in extreme disrepair. It was acquired in 2015 by the Ohio History Connection, a preservation organization that has stabilized its condition and plans to restore it.

== See also ==
- List of National Historic Landmarks in Ohio
- National Register of Historic Places listings in Jefferson County, Ohio
