= Manumission Intelligencier =

American abolitionist newspaper

- Type: Weekly newspaper, then monthly
- Founder: Elihu Embree
- Founded: 1819; 206 years ago
- Ceased publication: 1820
- Political alignment: Abolitionist
- Language: English
- City: Jonesborough, Tennessee
- Country: United States

The Manumission Intelligencier was an abolitionist newspaper founded by Elihu Embree, a Quaker, in 1819. It was later renamed The Emancipator.

== History ==
In 1819, after securing the approval and cooperation of the Manumission Society of Tennessee, of which he was an active member, Embree began the publication of a weekly anti-slavery paper at Jonesborough, Tennessee, under the name of the Manumission Intelligencier, the first issue of which appeared in March. Very little is known concerning this paper. Of the fifty or more issues that were published, less than a dozen copies are known to have survived to the twentieth century.

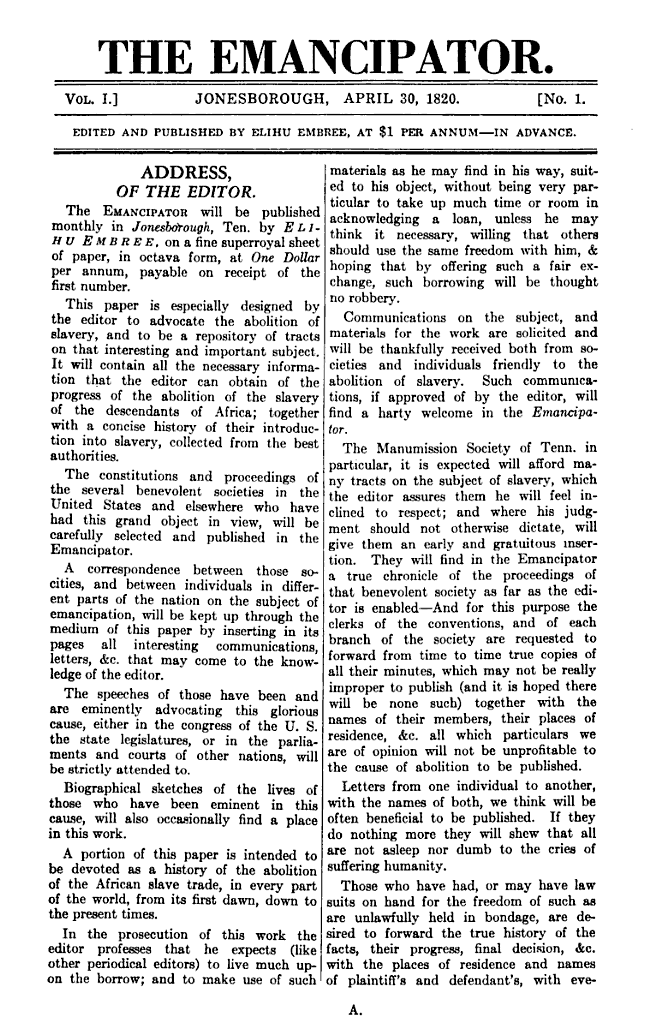
The first issue of The Emancipator

In April 1820, the paper switched from a weekly to a monthly format and changed its name to The Emancipator, though it remained under the same editorship. The object of the paper as set forth in an address to the general public in the first issue was to "advocate the abolition of slavery, and to be a repository of tracts on that interesting and important subject." In the paper, slavery and slaveholders were condemned in the strongest terms, and the evils of the system of slavery were forcefully pointed out.

Despite being an outspoken abolition paper published in a slave state, The Emancipator achieved remarkable popularity. At the time of Embree's early death it could boast of 2,000 paying subscribers, which was probably as large as that of any newspaper in either Tennessee or Kentucky. This was likely due to the strong anti-slavery sentiment that prevailed in East Tennessee at the time. On the other hand, the paper also encountered considerable opposition, both from those who supported slavery and those who condemned anti-slavery agitation.

The Emancipator had an existence of only eight months due to the death of Embree, aged 38, on December 4, 1820, from "bilious fever". A full collection of the journal, comprising one hundred and twelve pages, was reprinted in 1932 by B. H. Murphy.

The holdings of the paper were sold to another Quaker, Benjamin Lundy, and the publication was renamed The Genius of Universal Emancipation.

== Extant holdings, reprints, and digital facsimiles ==
- The Emancipator (Jonesborough, Tennessee, 1820)
  - Available free online: Vol. 1 no. 1 — Vol. 1 no. 7

Benjamin Harrison Murphy (1889–1878) (1932 re-print); OCLC 1019811804, 191233606, 173718223; 82972841
Benjamin Harrison Murphy (1889–1878) (1932 re-print; 1970 Chicago: Library of American Resources; Library Resources, Inc., microfilm); OCLC 11110026
Benjamin Harrison Murphy (1889–1878) (1932 re-print; 1970 Chicago: Library of American Resources; Library Resources, Inc., microfiche); OCLC 433665821
Embreeville Publications (1995 re-print); OCLC 430322644

== See also ==
- The Emancipator (newspaper)
- Abolitionist publications
