= Elizabeth Margaret Chandler =

American poet

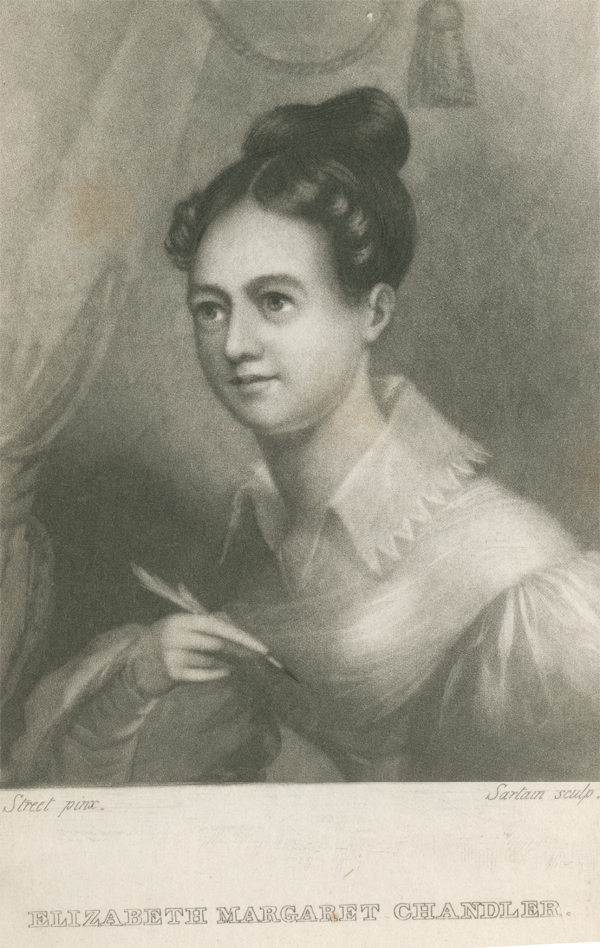
- Elizabeth Margaret Chandler, The Poetical Works (pub. 1836) - frontispiece
- Born: December 24, 1807; Centre, Delaware, U.S.
- Died: November 2, 1834 (aged 26); Michigan, U.S.
- Occupations: Writer and Poet

Elizabeth Margaret Chandler (December 24, 1807 – November 2, 1834) was an American poet and writer from Pennsylvania and Michigan. She became the first female writer in the United States to make the abolition of slavery her principal theme.

== Early life and education ==
Chandler was born in Centre, Delaware, on Christmas Eve, 1807 to Thomas Chandler (1773–1817) and Margaret Evans (1778–1808). She had two older brothers, William Guest Chandler (1804–1873) and Thomas Chandler (1806–?). They were members of the Religious Society of Friends (or Quakers), and they lived the strict, orderly and disciplined life of a Quaker family.

By the time she was nine years old both her parents had died. She and her brothers were living with their grandmother, Elizabeth Guest Evans (1744–1827), in Philadelphia, Pennsylvania. Elizabeth attended a Quaker school and there embraced the Quaker view of antislavery. Elizabeth started writing poems at a very early age. She left school when she was about twelve or thirteen (sources differ), but continued to read and write with a passion.

== Career ==
At the early age of sixteen, Elizabeth Chandler's romantic verses on nature were first published. In 1825, when she was eighteen years old, her emotional poem, "The Slave-Ship", was published and drew national attention. After reading that poem, she was invited by Benjamin Lundy, a well known abolitionist and publisher, to write for his periodical, The Genius of Universal Emancipation. She wrote for and edited the "Ladies' Repository" section of his newspaper. She used her appeal to women to demand better treatment for Native Americans and the immediate emancipation of slaves. She became one of the most powerful female writers of her time. She often used the tragic example of female slaves being torn away from their children and their husbands to gain sympathy from her female readers. When told that women did not have the power to abolish slavery, Chandler responded that, as mothers, women are in the unique position:

...to give the first bent to the minds of those, who at some future day are to be their country's counselors.

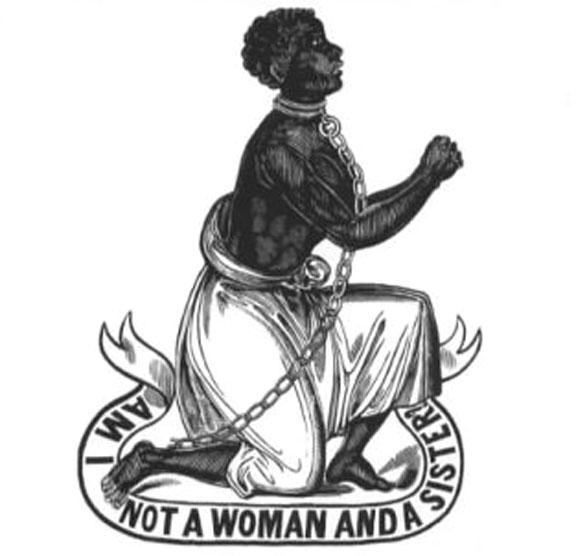
A medallion image similar to the one Chandler made popular

It is hard to say exactly how influential her writings were to the public at large. However, many of her articles were copied and circulated in the most popular newspapers of the time. She also introduced one of the most famous abolitionist images, the kneeling female slave with the slogan "Am I not a Woman and a Sister". Taken from the image depicting a male slave for the seal of the Society for the Abolition of the Slave Trade designed by Wedgwood. Two years later, William Lloyd Garrison editor of The Liberator, and a leader in the abolitionist movement, adopted this symbol and slogan to head the ladies department of the paper, one of the most prominent abolitionist papers of the time. In his obituary of Lundy, Garrison wrote, "It was friend Lundy's good fortune to have the assistance of the late Elizabeth M. Chandler, for several years, in the management of his paper—a young woman of extraordinary talents, and completely absorbed in her endeavors to let the oppressed go free. Her writings have been published in a volume, and are generally known to abolitionists; but her devotion to the cause has never been duly appreciated."

=== Move to Michigan ===
In 1830, Elizabeth Margaret Chandler moved, with her aunt and brother, to the territory of Michigan. Her brother Thomas Chandler purchased land near Tecumseh, Michigan in Lenawee County, about sixty miles south-west of Detroit, in order to start a farm. They called the place Hazlebank.

From this, her quiet and secluded retreat, emanated some of the choicest productions of her pen.

— Benjamin Lundy

Chandler participated in national discussions and debates through her articles and poems about Abolitionism. She continued to edit Benjamin Lundy's Abolitionist Journal.

While living in Philadelphia, Chandler had been a member of a Female Anti-Slavery Society, although she was not very active. After she moved to Michigan, she established the Logan Female Anti-Slavery Society in 1832 with her friend and neighbor Laura Smith Haviland.

She wrote:

Terrible in crime and magnitude as the slavery of our country is, I do not despair — apathy must — will awaken, and opposition die — the cause of justice must triumph, or our country must be ruined.

The Logan Female Anti-Slavery Society organization established a main link in the Underground Railroad to Canada.

== Death ==
Chandler died from "remittent fever" on November 2, 1834, shortly before her 27th birthday. She was buried near the family farm at Hazlebank. Her articles, poems, and letters were gathered and published as two books, by Benjamin Lundy, and the proceeds from the sale of those books went to the cause of abolition.

== Bibliography ==
- Essays, Philanthropic and Moral. Lemuel Howell. 1836.
- The poetical works of Elizabeth Margaret Chandler: With a memoir of her life and character. Lemuel Howell. 1836. ASIN B0008BINBE.
