= Mount Pleasant Historic District (Mt. Pleasant, Ohio) =

Historic district in Ohio, United States

- U.S. National Register of Historic Places
- U.S. National Historic Landmark District
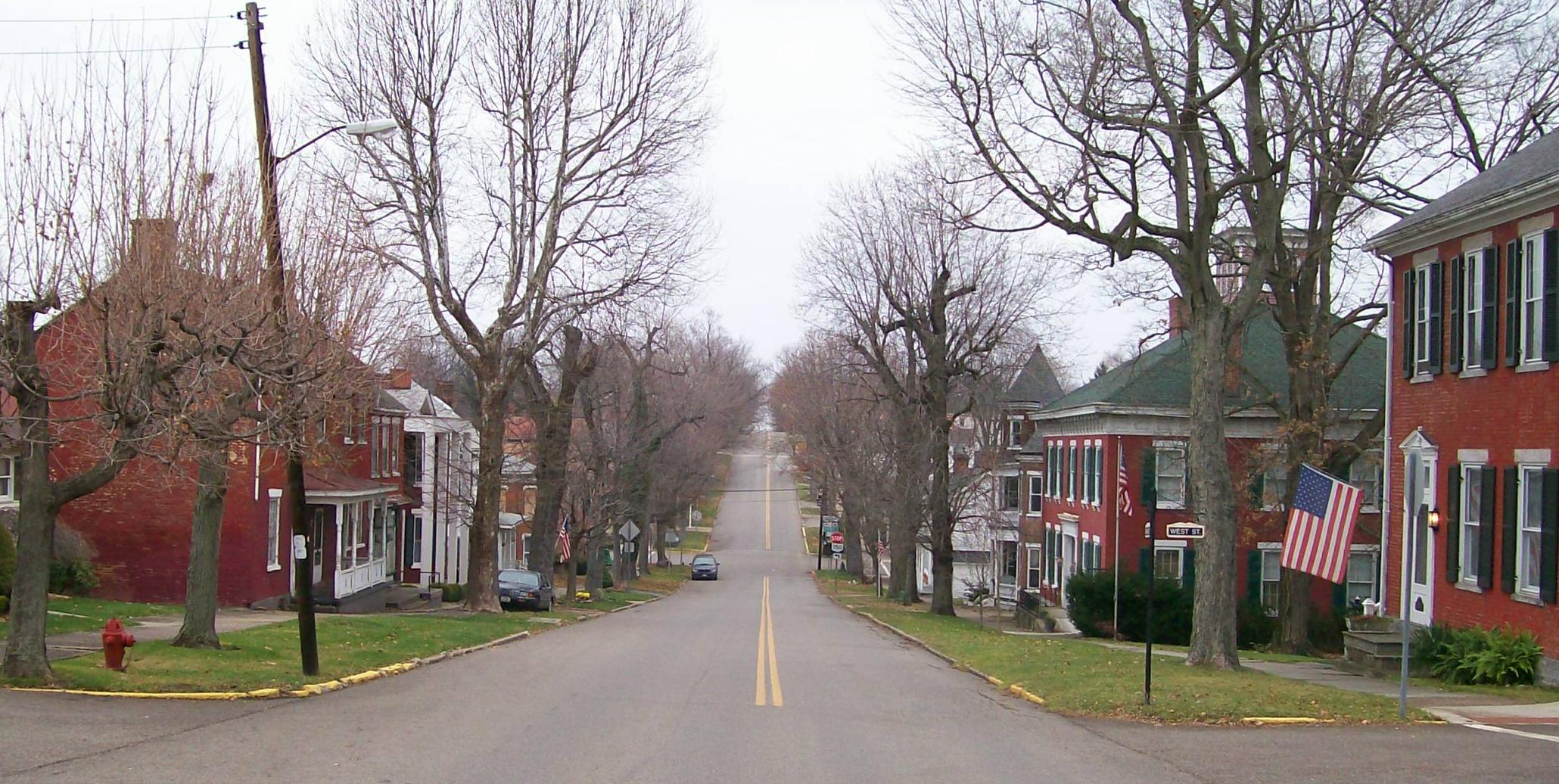
- Along Union Street in the district

- Location within Ohio Location within the United States
- Location: Mount Pleasant, Ohio
- Coordinates: 40°10′28″N 80°47′55″W
- Area: 54 acres (22 ha)
- NRHP reference No.: 74001536

Significant dates
- Added to NRHP: June 28, 1974
- Designated NHLD: April 5, 2005

The Mount Pleasant Historic District encompasses the historic center of the village of Mount Pleasant, Ohio. Founded in 1803 by anti-slavery Quakers, the village was an early center of abolitionist activity and a well-known haven for fugitive slaves on the Underground Railroad. The village center is relatively little altered since the antebellum period. The district was listed on the National Register of Historic Districts in 1974, and was designated a National Historic Landmark in 2005.

== Description and history ==
The town of Mount Pleasant was established in 1803 by Robert Carothers, an Irishman from Virginia, and Jesse Thomas, a Quaker from North Carolina. The town was founded in part out of anti-slavery sentiment by North Carolina Quakers who specifically sought a place where their slaves could be freed. The town was platted in 1803, and its original street and lot plan are intact from this period, organized around the intersection of Union and Concord Streets. Additional areas west of the original plat were added in 1815 and 1817, the town has experienced growth as a supply center for the War of 1812. Although the town boasted a mix of residential and commercial properties on its main roads in the 1820s, it is now almost entirely residential. Prominent non-residential buildings include the Friends Meetinghouse built by the Quakers in 1814 to house the first yearly meeting established west of the Allegheny Mountains.

The village is important for the role it played in the antislavery movement and the Underground Railroad. From an early date, the strong Quaker population in Mount Pleasant preached and practiced its abolitionist views and published antislavery literature, such as Benjamin Lundy's "Genius of Universal Emancipation." A station on the Underground Railroad, the town was a refuge for fugitive slaves and a welcome home for free blacks. Residents built and administered a school for free black children, and in 1848 established a Free Produce Store which sold no products produced by slave labor. The town was also integrated to some degree, with African-American living among whites, generally as servants. African Americans also owned property, but this was generally in the outlying areas of the community. The village's economic fortunes stagnated after the American Civil War came to an end because it was bypassed by the railroads.

== See also ==
- List of Underground Railroad sites
- List of National Historic Landmarks in Ohio
