= David Benjamin Updegraff =

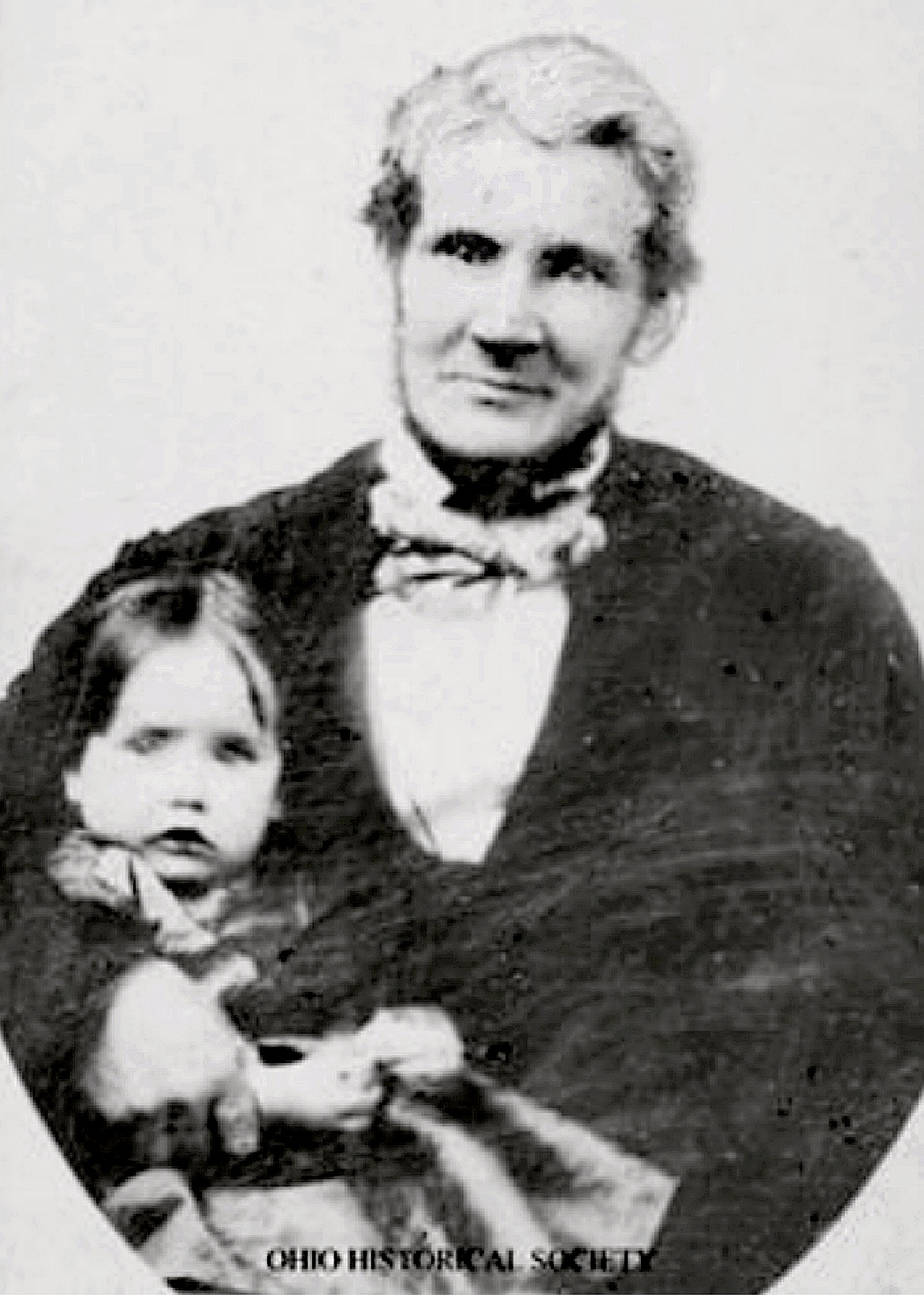
David Benjamin Updegraff

David Benjamin Updegraff, also David Updegraff, David B. Updegraff and Rev. David Updegraff (January 24, 1789 – December 20, 1864) was an American Quaker minister, abolitionist and conductor of a station of the Underground Railroad from Ohio.

== Biography ==
David Benjamin Updegraff was born the son of Nathan Updegraff, a founder and delegate to Ohio's first constitutional convention, and Anne Updegraff (née Lupton). He descended from a long line of ministers and elders of the Quaker church, which belong to the Op den Graeffs, a German family of Dutch origin. He was a direct descendant of Herman op den Graeff, Mennonite leader of Krefeld, and his grandson Abraham op den Graeff, one of the founders of Germantown and a signer of the first protest against slavery in colonial America in 1688.

Updegraff grew up in Winchester, Virginia, but in 1802 he moved with his family to Mount Pleasant, Jefferson, Ohio. Like his ancestors he owned a farm. He also served as a minister for the Society of Friends (Quakers). In 1812 he married with Rebecca Taylor Updegraff (1790-1867). She worked as a well-regarded Quaker minister. Like his well known Updegraff-ancestors the couple were actively involved in the anti-slavery movement. They were members of the Anti-Slavery League and used their house as a station on the Underground Railroad. It was the home of anti-slavery advocats and temperance lectures.

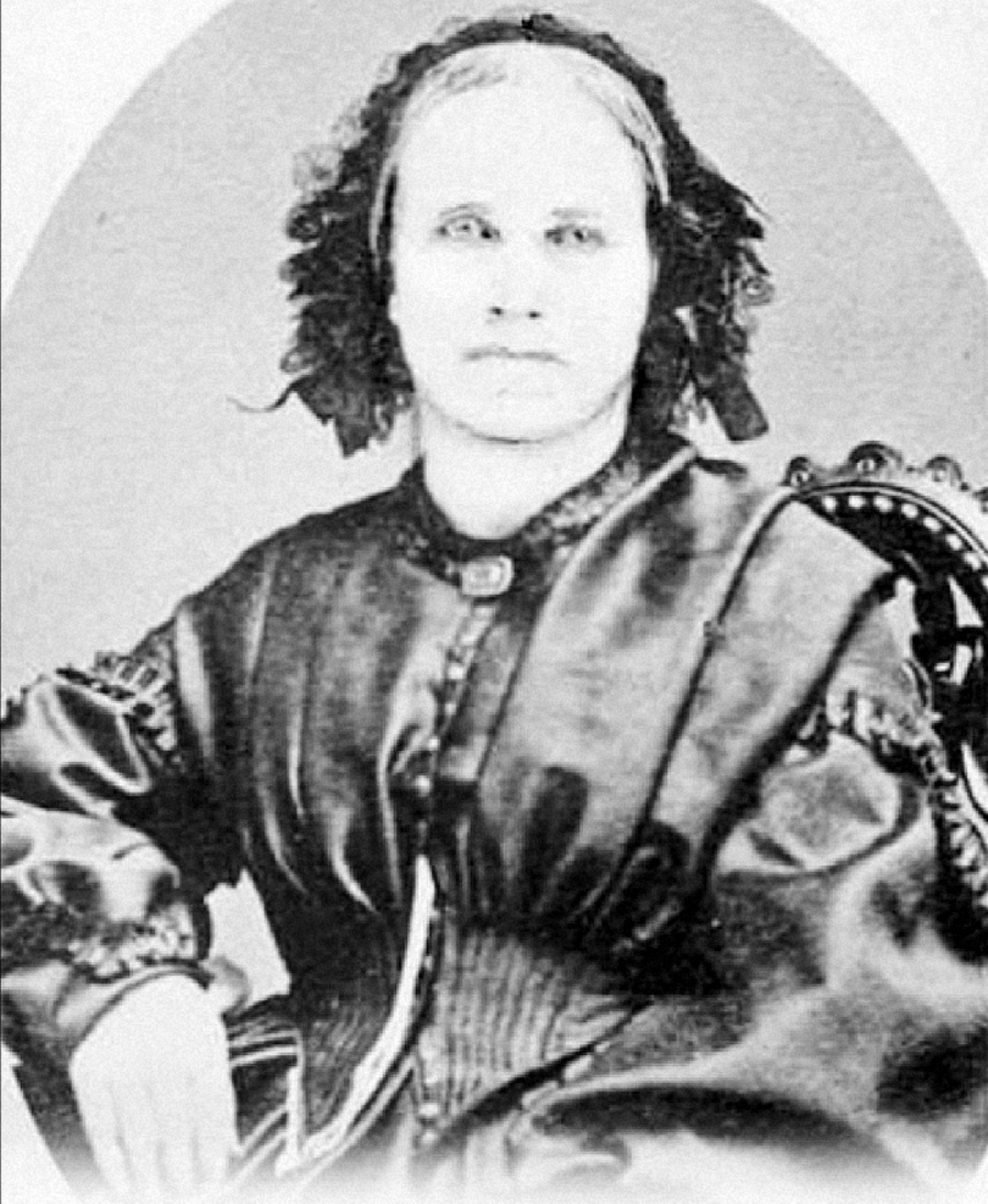
Rebecca Taylor Updegraff

David Benjamin and Rebecca Taylor Updegraff had eight children:

- Mary Ann Updegraff (1813–1822)
- Eliza Updegraff (1816–1817)
- Sarah Emeline Updegraff (1818–1902)
- Ann Taylor Updegraff (1820–1861)
- Jonathan Taylor Updegraff (1822–1882), U.S. Representative from Ohio
- Rebecca A Updegraff (1824–1848)
- Elizabeth Updegraff (1827–1840)
- David Brainard Updegraff (1830–1894), minister of Friends church (Quaker minister)

=== Coat of arms ===
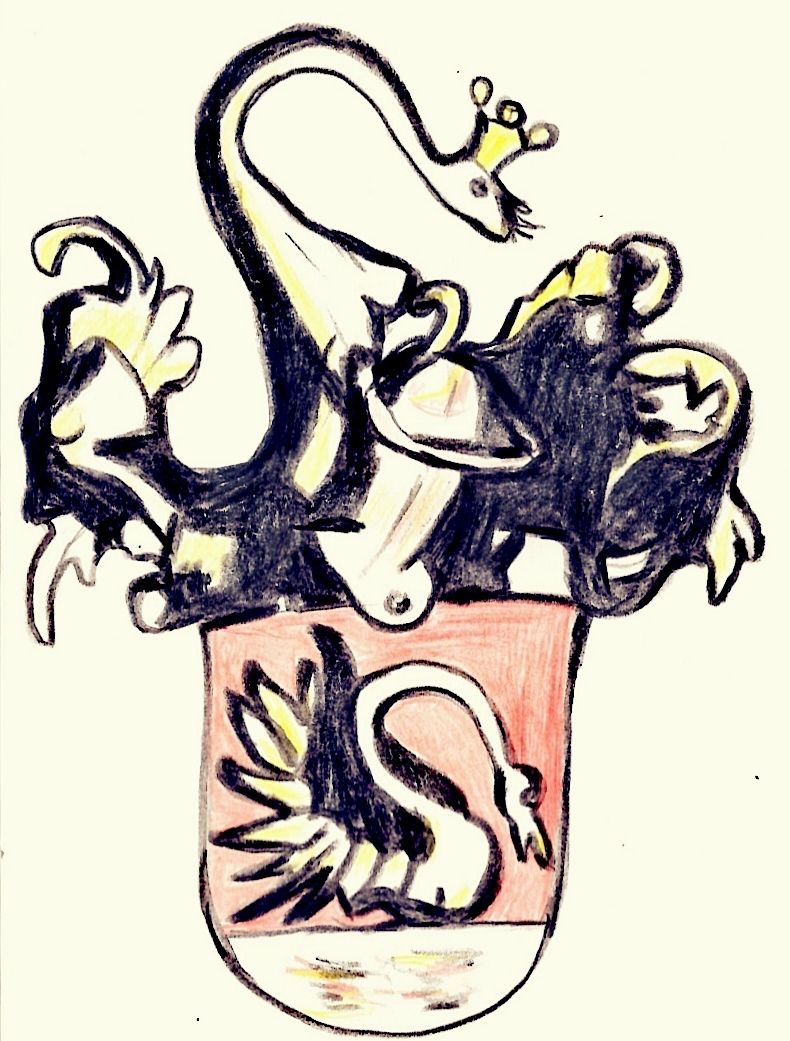
Possible, but not proven, coat of arms Op den Graeff as descendants of Herman op den Graeff (Heraldic representation by Matthias Laurenz Gräff based on the Krefeld Op den Graeff stained glass window from 1630, which may depict the “Lohengrin swan” of the Kleve coat of arms in one window)

There is a reference about the Op den Graeff glass paintings of Krefeld with a description of Herman op den Graeffs possible, but not proven coat of Arms was found in the estate of W. Niepoth (op den Graeff folder) in the archives of the city of Krefeld, who noted a letter dated November 17, 1935 from Richard Wolfferts to Dr Risler: Saw the Coat of Arms glass pane in the old museum: 'Herman op den Graeff und Grietgen syn housfrau' or the like. Coat of Arms - In the sign a silver swan in blue. Helmet decoration (I think): Swan growing.

== Literature ==
- J. Brent Bill, "David B. Updegraff, Quaker Holiness Preacher" (1983)
