= Nathan Updegraff =

American Quaker minister and abolitionist

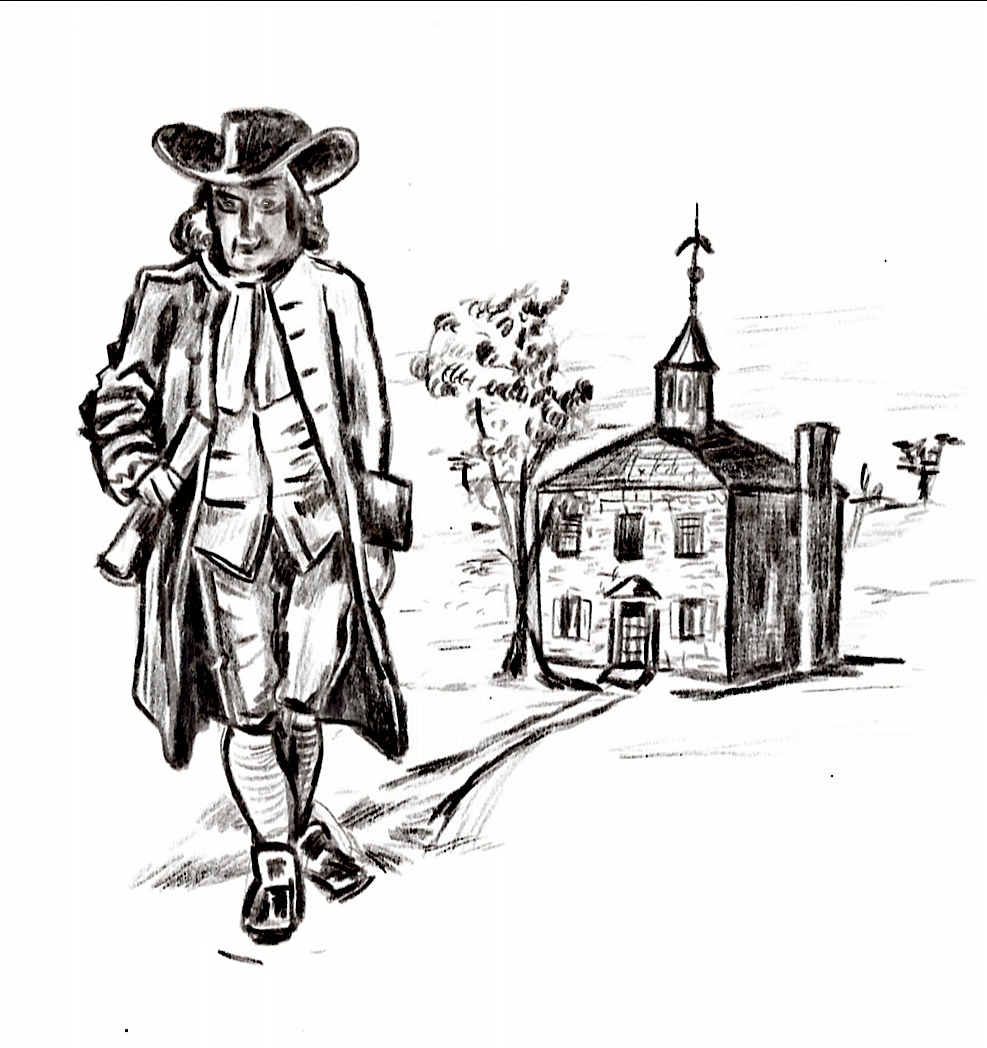

Delegate to the 1802 Ohio Constitutional Convention from Jefferson County
- In office November 1, 1802 – November 29, 1802 Serving with Rudolph Bair; George Humphrey; John Milligan; Bezaleel Wells

Personal details
- Born: September 3, 1750 York County, Pennsylvania
- Died: March 3, 1827 (aged 76) Mount Pleasant, Ohio
- Spouse(s): Ann Love; Ann Lupton
- Children: David Benjamin Updegraff among nine others

Nathan Updegraff (September 3, 1750 in York County, Pennsylvania - March 3, 1827 in Mount Pleasant, Jefferson County, Ohio) was an American Quaker minister, abolitionist and founder and delegate to Ohio's first constitutional convention in 1802.

== Biography ==
Nathan Updegraff was born to the couple Joseph Updegraff (1726-1801), commissioner of York County, Pennsylvania, and Mary Webb Updegraff (1747-1833). He descended from a long line of ministers and elders of the Quaker church, which belong to the Op den Graeffs, a German family of Dutch origin. He was a direct descendant of Herman op den Graeff, Mennonite leader of Krefeld, and his grandson Abraham op den Graeff, one of the founders of Germantown, and who in 1688 was a signer of the first protest against slavery in colonial America.

Nathan grew up in York County, Pennsylvania. In 1780 he married Ann Love (around 1757-1787/88) and after his first wife's death he remarried Ann Lupton (9 June 1767 - 25 December 1833) in 1788. Afterwards they settled in Winchester, Virginia and established a factory. In 1801 they joined the Quaker migration to the Northwest Territory. In the following year Updegraff and his family moved to Mount Pleasant, Jefferson, Ohio. In the same year he became founder and delegate to Ohio's first constitutional convention for Jefferson County. Nathan became a leader and minister of the Quakers in that area. He also served as a charter member of the Concord monthly meeting, the first in Ohio. They built up a meeting house in 1806/07 which was the largest one in the state. Mount Pleasant became a center of Quaker activity in eastern Ohio. Due his and other Quakers influence and work the city became a center of the abolition movement. Politically and socially, he not only strongly opposed slavery within the state, but also voted to extend various civil rights, including the right to vote, to Black people.

Updegraff built the first Mill in Mount Pleasant Township, manufactured paper and owned estates of 1,586 acres.

=== Offspring ===
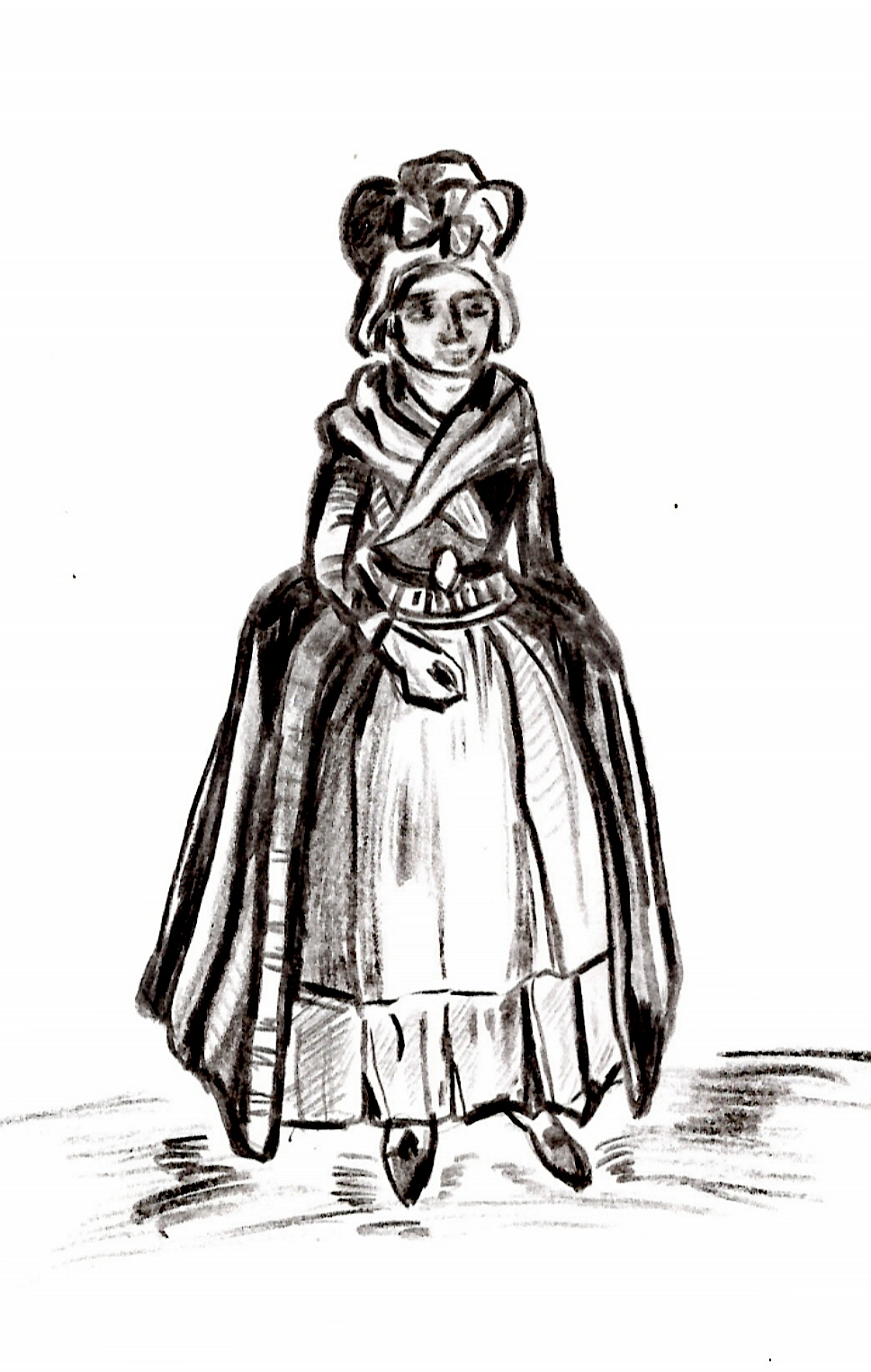
Ann Lupton Updegraff (9 June 1767 - 25 December 1833)

Nathan Updegraff and Anne Love (around 1757-1787/88) had following children:

- James Updegraff (1781-1871)
- Joseph Updegraff (1783-1840)
- David Benjamin Updegraff (1789-1864)

Children of Nathan Updegraff and Ann Lupton (9 June 1767 - 25 December 1833):

- Rachel Updegraff (1790-1821)
- Hannah Updegraff (1792-1882)
- Nathan Updegraff Jr. (1795-1871)
- Nancy Updegraff (1801-1855)
- Mary Updegraff (1804-1871)
- Josiah Updegraff (1810-1881)
- Thomas Updegraff (* 1811)

=== Coat of arms ===
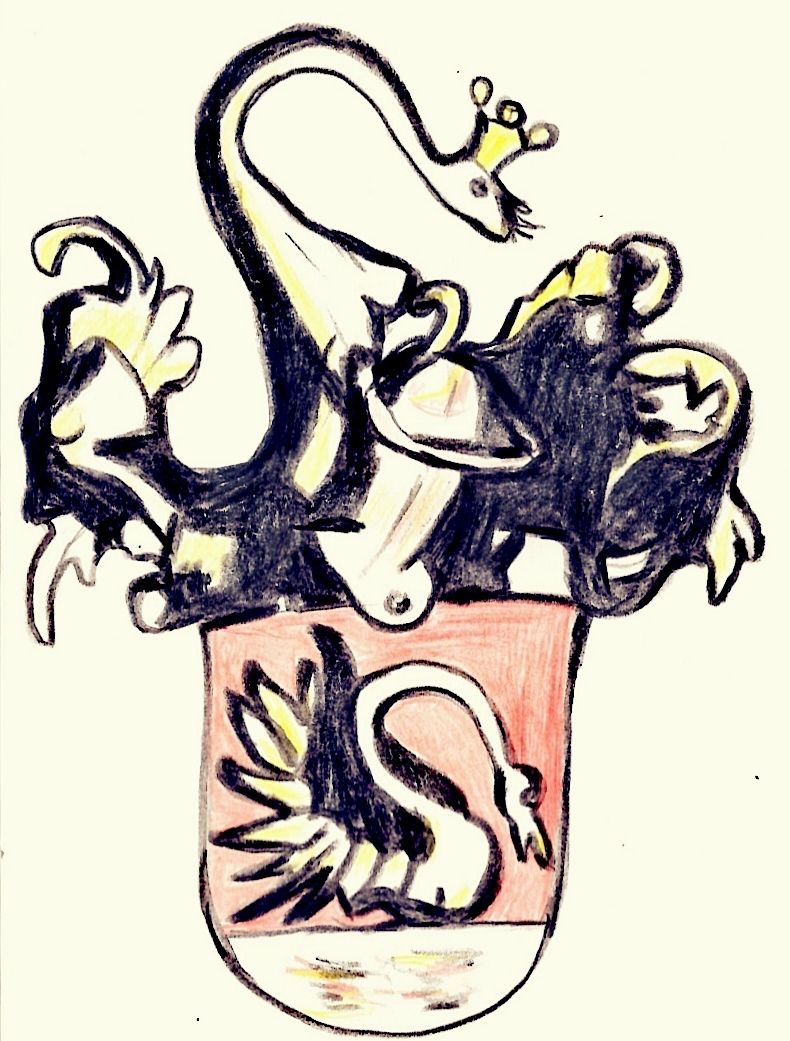
Possible, but not proven, coat of arms Op den Graeff as descendants of Herman op den Graeff (Heraldic representation by Matthias Laurenz Gräff based on the Krefeld Op den Graeff stained glass window from 1630, which may depict the “Lohengrin swan” of the Kleve coat of arms in one window)

There is a reference about the Op den Graeff glass paintings of Krefeld with a description of Herman op den Graeffs coat of arms was found in the estate of W. Niepoth (op den Graeff folder) in the archives of the city of Krefeld, who noted a letter dated November 17, 1935 from Richard Wolfferts to Dr Risler: Saw the Coat of Arms glass pane in the old museum: 'Herman op den Graeff und Grietgen syn housfrau' or the like. Coat of Arms - In the sign a silver swan in blue. Helmet decoration (I think): Swan growing.

== Literature ==
- Ohio's Founding Father's, p 226 ff, by Fred Milligan (2003)
