= Stringer Stone House =

Historic house in Ohio, United States

- U.S. National Register of Historic Places
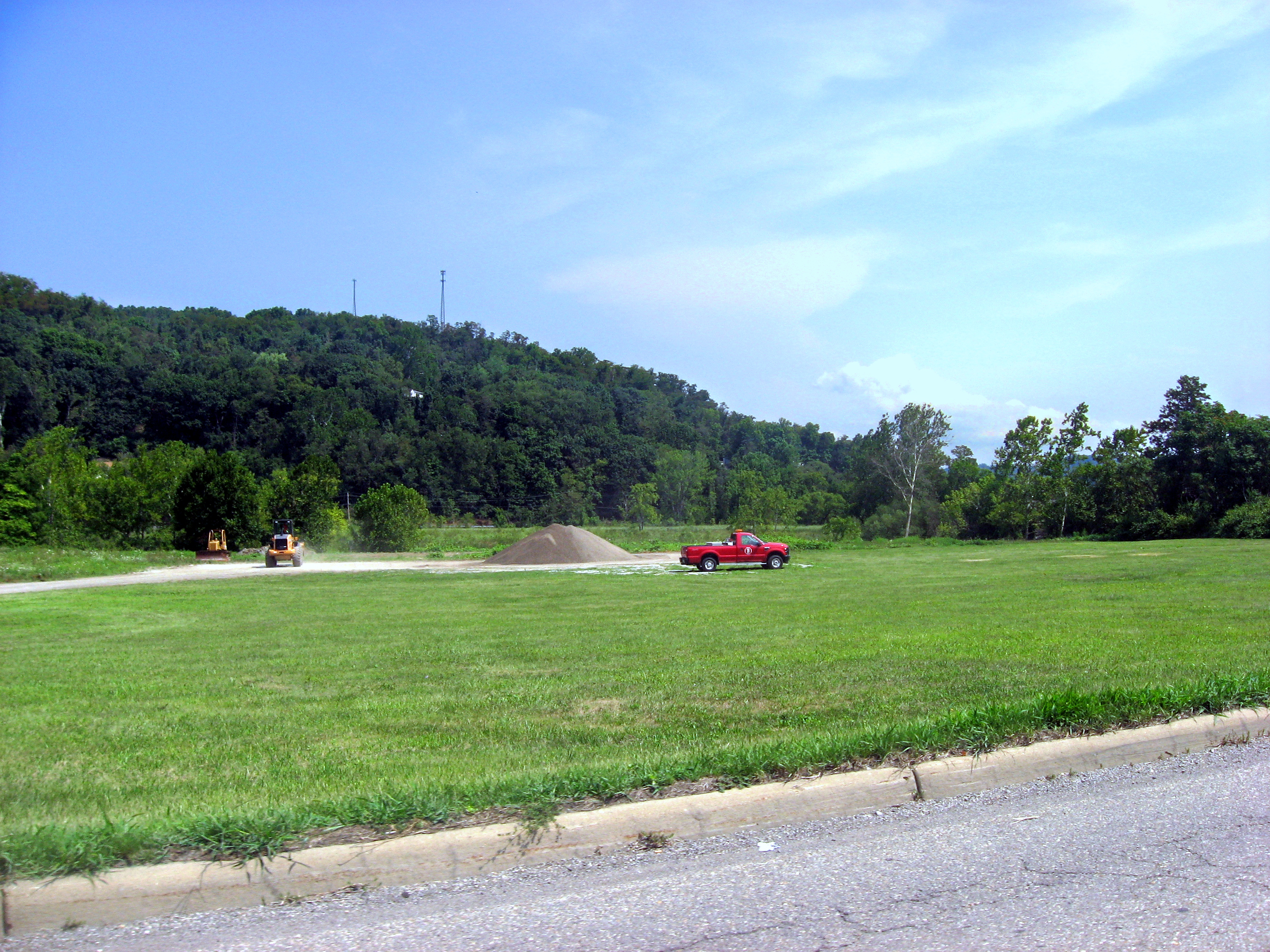
- Site of the house

- Location within Ohio Location within the United States
- Location: 224 Warren St., Rayland, Ohio
- Coordinates: 40°11′20″N 80°41′25″W
- Area: less than one acre
- Built: 1836
- NRHP reference No.: 74001538
- Added to NRHP: July 10, 1974

The Stringer Stone House, also known as the John B. Bayless House, was a historic stone mansion located at 224 Warren Avenue in Rayland, Ohio. The house was added to the National Register of Historic Places on July 10, 1974. It was destroyed by fire in 1982.

The house was built in 1836 by John Brown Bayless, an abolitionist from Maryland. The interior was decorated with murals by an Italian artist, including a waterfall beside the stairs, William Penn's treaty with the Indians, a castle in England, and a gristmill and mill workers. In 1860 it was purchased by Jefferson D. Stringer. Rutherford B. Hayes visited it in 1876, during his term as governor of Ohio.

Bayless constructed a three-and-a-half-story building out of gray sandstone. Much about the design was unusual: he placed the main entrances on the second story, the stone chimneys on each end consisted of attached pairs, and the house faced away from the road. The largest exception to the house's almost complete stone construction was a small wooden porch surrounding the front entrance; it was accessed by a set of stone steps.

The house was destroyed by a fire in 1982. As of 2012 the site remained vacant.
