= Benjamin Lundy =

American Quaker abolitionist (1789–1839)

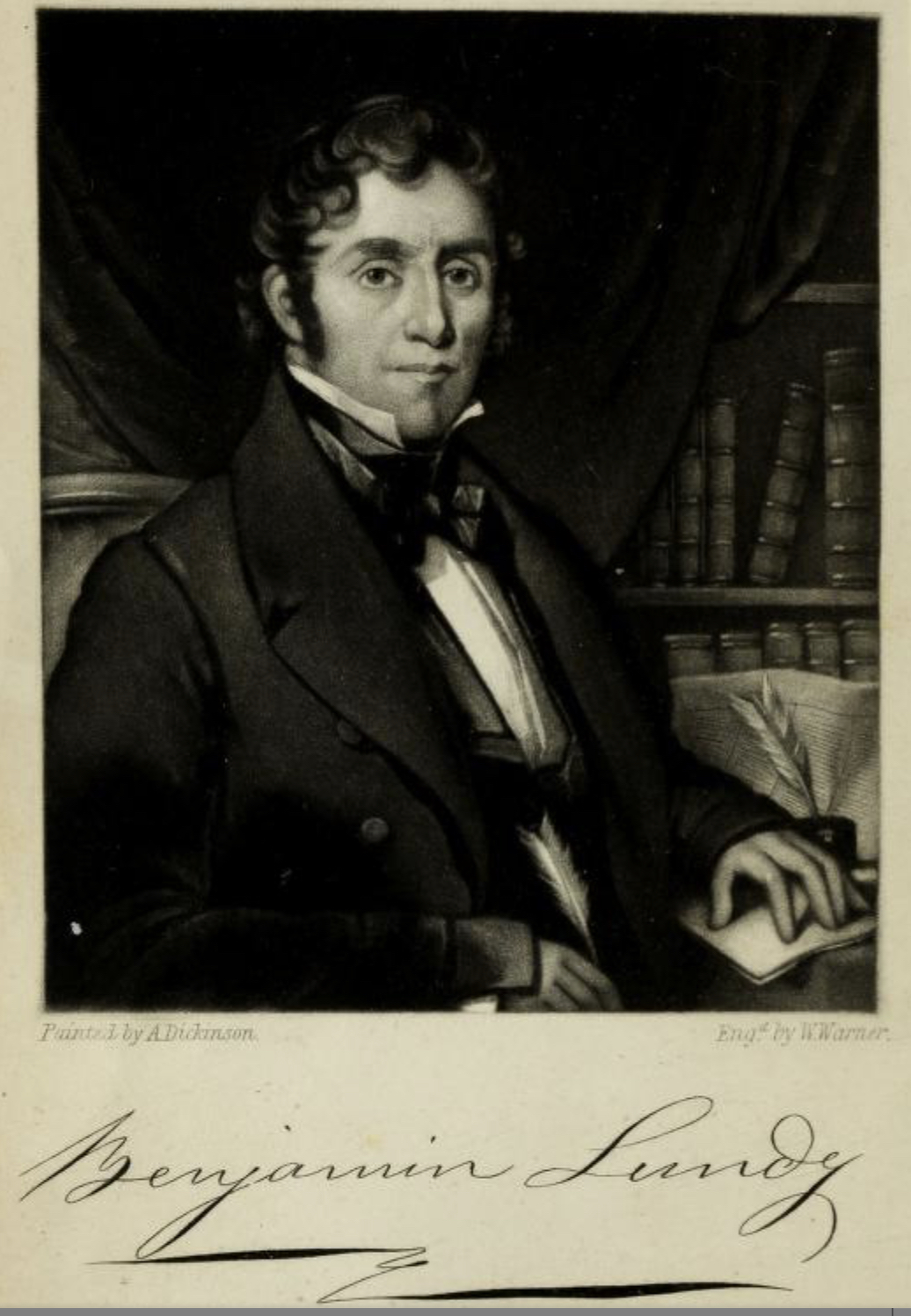
- Born: January 4, 1789; Hardwick Township, New Jersey, US
- Died: August 22, 1839 (aged 50); Lowell, Illinois, US
- Occupations: Saddler, abolitionist newspaper publisher and speaker
- Known for: Anti-slavery activities
- Spouse: Esther Lewis
- Children: Susan Maria Lundy Wierman (1815–1899), Charles Tallmadge Lundy (1821–1870), Benjamin Clarkson Lundy (1826–1861), Elizabeth (1818–1879), and Esther (1826–1917).
- Parent(s): Joseph and Elizabeth Shotwell Lundy

Benjamin Lundy (January 4, 1789 – August 22, 1839) was an American Quaker abolitionist from New Jersey of the United States who established several anti-slavery newspapers and traveled widely. He lectured and published seeking to limit slavery's expansion and tried to find a place outside the United States to establish a colony in which freed slaves might relocate.

As William Lloyd Garrison pointed out in a eulogy, Lundy was not the first American abolitionist, but "he was the first of our countrymen who devoted his life and all his power exclusively to the cause of the slaves."

== Early and family life ==
Lundy was born to Joseph and Elizabeth Shotwell Lundy, both Quakers, at Greensville, Hardwick Township, Sussex County, New Jersey. His mother died when he was four, but he became close to his stepmother, Mary Titus Lundy. As a boy, he worked on his father's farm, attending school for only brief periods. In 1804, New Jersey passed a law allowing gradual emancipation of slaves, although the 1810 census in Sussex County showed that more than half of the 758 black people were still enslaved.

However, by that time, young Lundy had moved to Wheeling, Virginia (now in West Virginia). In 1808 he was apprenticed to a saddler. On the Ohio River, Wheeling was on important transit point of the interstate slave trade, with coffles of slaves often marched through town. Many would be shipped down the Ohio River toward Kentucky (a slave state) and additional slave states down the Mississippi River. In Wheeling, Lundy saw firsthand many iniquities inherent in the institution of slavery, including the use of horsewhips and bludgeons to force barefoot human beings to walk through mud and snow. He determined to devote his life to the cause of abolition.

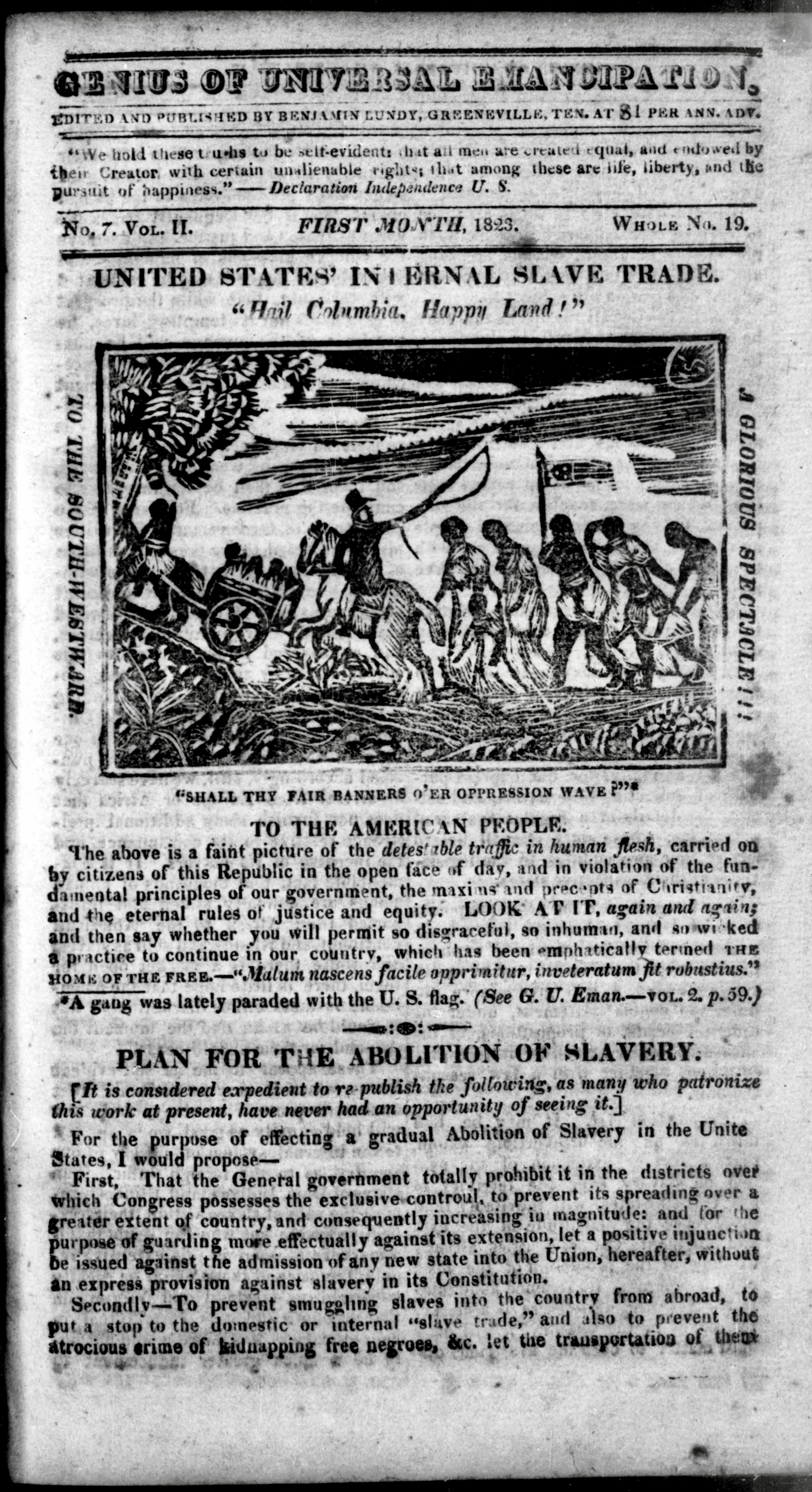
In 1823, Benjamin Lundy published a woodcut depicting a coffle of marching south under the 24-star American flag, a scene that had been witnessed by a correspondent visiting Paris, Kentucky on September 17, 1822. (Genius of Universal Emancipation, Greeneville, Tennessee, January 1823)

Lundy also became acquainted with a local Quaker family, the Stantons, who lived a dozen miles west from Wheeling, in Mt. Pleasant, Ohio. Ohio did not permit slavery, and Benjamin Stanton would become a U.S. Congressman from that district, and two decades after Lundy's death, his brother Edwin Stanton would become Secretary of War under President Abraham Lincoln.

In December 1814 Lundy and Esther Lewis declared their intent to marry in the local Quaker meeting, and did so on February 13, 1815. Her brother William married Lydia Stanton, sister of David Stanton (Edwin Stanton's father). On November 18, 1815, they had their first child, Susan Maria Lundy Wierman (d. 1899). In the following decades, Esther bore two more sons, Charles Tallmadge Lundy (1821–1870) and Benjamin Clarkson Lundy (1826–1861), and two additional daughters, Elizabeth (1818–1879) and Esther (1826–1917).

== Career ==
The young family settled in Saint Clairsville, Ohio, where Lundy soon built up a profitable saddlery business along the highway west (that later became Interstate 70). In 1815, he and five others also organized an anti-slavery association, known as the Union Humane Society, which within a few months had a membership of more than 500. Prominent members included lawyer journalist Charles Hammond, James Wilson (grandfather of President Woodrow Wilson) and Joseph Howells (father of William Dean Howells). Fellow Quaker Charles Osborne, who editing the Philanthropist (later moved to Cincinnati), also showed him journalism and printing basics.

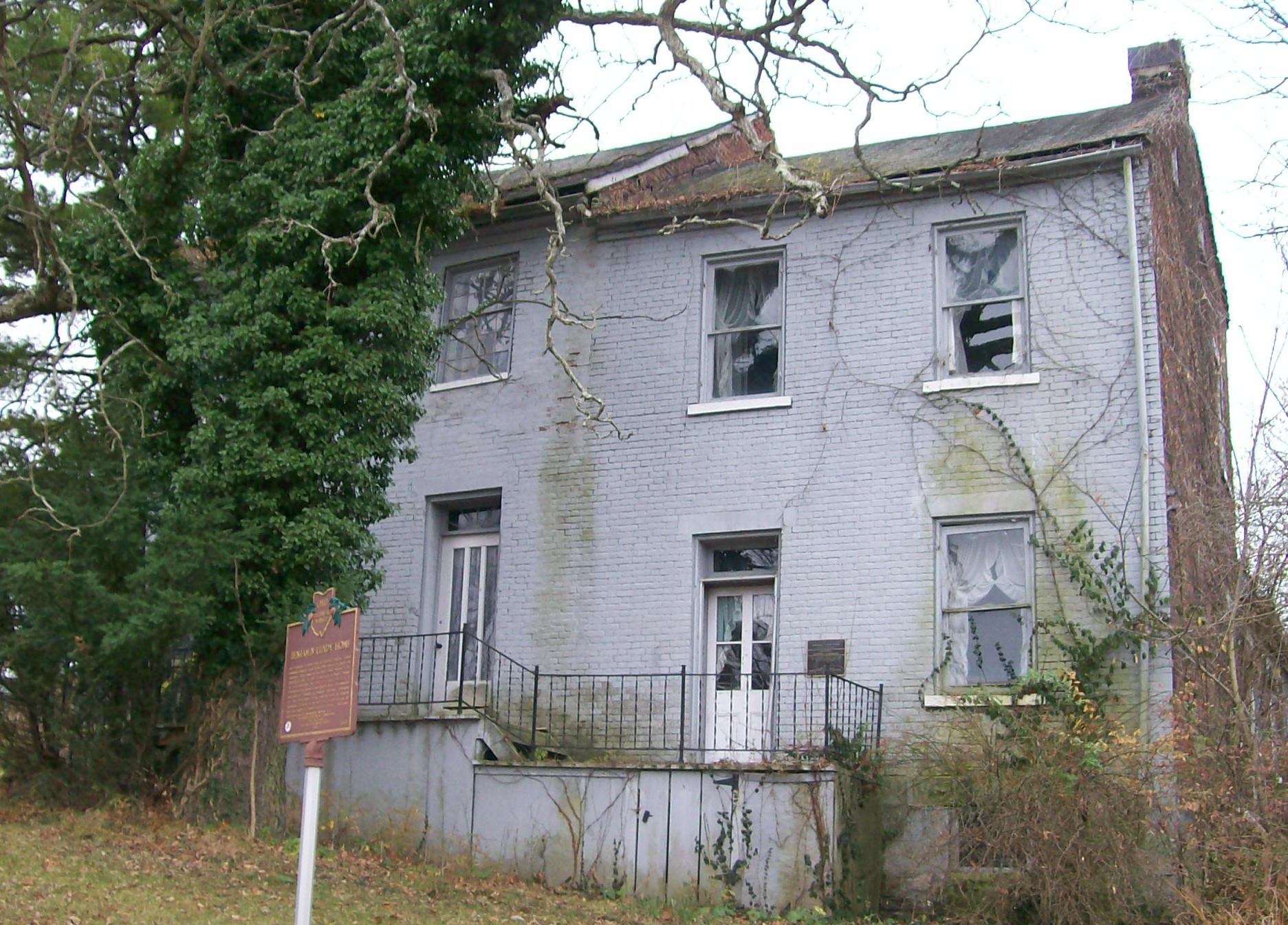
Lundy's house in Mount Pleasant

On his birthday, January 4, 1816, Lundy published a circular indicating his intent to found a national anti-slavery society to focus antislavery sentiment and activity. That became his life's work. He named his first son to honor James Tallmadge, whose antislavery speech in the U.S. House on February 16, 1819, Lundy printed in full.

=== Missouri, Ohio, and Tennessee ===
Lundy decided to liquidate his saddlery business in favor of a publishing business. He and three apprentices moved their stock to St. Louis, Missouri, then the center of a national slavery controversy. However, that area too was gripped by a national depression since the Panic of 1819. His side lost—Missouri was admitted as a slave state as a result of the Missouri Compromise of 1820.

The intrepid activist lost goods he valued at over $1000, then trudged 700 miles back to St. Clairville, only to find that Osborne had sold his printing business to Elisha Bates, who did not need additional help. Lundy then established his own anti-slavery paper, the Genius of Universal Emancipation, at Mount Pleasant, Ohio, with the first issue published in January 1821. This periodical, first a monthly and later a weekly, was published successively in Ohio, Greenville, Tennessee, Baltimore, Maryland, the District of Columbia and Philadelphia, Pennsylvania. It appeared irregularly, and at times, when Lundy was away on lecturing tours, was issued from any office that he could access. Newspapers including the Niles Weekly Register, the New York Spectator and papers from Connecticut and Edwardsville, Illinois reprinted Lundy's exposés.

However, anti-slavery activism did not pay well, and slaveholders did not believe Lundy's arguments that slavery stifled progress, despite his comparisons of the relative prosperity of New York and Pennsylvania with Virginia. Lundy had been recruited to Greenville, Tennessee to work against slavery in a slave state after the death of Elihu Embree, but he found the hostility formidable. Lundy used the equipment purchased from Embree's estate to begin publishing the American Economist and Weekly Political Reporter with more standard farm prices, business and political news in 1822. He also continued to lecture against slavery, and in 1824 attended the American Convention for the Abolition of Slavery, in Philadelphia, Pennsylvania, where he connected with other activists, including Robert Purvis. He also traveled to New York to meet with Quaker activist Elias Hicks and to lecture against slavery in North Carolina.

=== Baltimore and the District of Columbia ===
After selecting Baltimore to re-establish his business after deciding to move from Tennessee, Lundy moved his family to Maryland in October, 1825. This enabled Lundy to print his newspaper weekly instead of monthly or even less frequently. Lundy also published a biography of Harford County, Maryland, philanthropist and abolitionist Elisha Tyson, as well as a proposal for the gradual emancipation of slaves. In 1826, a slaveowner offered to free twelve slaves if Lundy would accompany them to Haiti. He did so, but found on his return that his wife Esther had died giving birth to twins, and his children were scattered among friends.

On January 9, 1827 Baltimore's most notorious slave-trader, Austin Woolfolk, whom Lundy had been investigating in public records since his move to Baltimore and severely criticizing, assaulted Lundy as he walked along a downtown street. Head-kicks and other injuries until bystanders pulled the strapping Woolfolk off his slightly-built victim confined Lundy to his bed for several days. Woolfolk pleaded guilty to assault, but Judge Nicholas Brice agreed with Woolfolk's lawyers that Lundy had provoked it by criticizing Woolfolk's lawful occupation, and therefore sentenced the slave trader to a one-dollar fine and court costs. He also urged Woolfolk to bring criminal libel charges against Lundy, but a grand jury refused to indict him.

From September 1829 until March 1830, Wm. Lloyd Garrison assisted Lundy in editing the Genius. At this time, the paper was located in Baltimore. Both deplored slavery, but Garrison advocated immediate emancipation on American soil, while Lundy was committed to schemes of colonization abroad. Within a few months, while Lundy traveled in Mexico, Garrison published an exposé of an October slaving voyage of a ship owned by his former neighbor, Francis Todd of Newburyport, Massachusetts, in a deal brokered by Woolfolk. Garrison also published radical articles demanding immediate emancipation, and asserting that the domestic slave trade was as piratical as the foreign. His column the "Black List" detailing atrocities brought trouble, since Garrison was not as careful as Lundy had been at avoiding libels. In February 1830 Maryland charged Garrison with criminal libel, and Woolfolk's ally Judge Brice sentenced Garrison to a fifty dollar fine plus court costs, and a six-month jail term if he did not pay. This so reduced the Genius's circulation that a friendly dissolution of the partnership between Lundy and Garrison took place after Garrison finished his jail term (where he was treated as a political prisoner and dined with the warden and his wife, as well as wrote extensively). However, Garrison returned to Boston (where he suffered a mob attack in 1835), although Woolfolk's trade also diminished, supplanted by Franklin & Armfield of Alexandria (at the time in the District of Columbia). Lundy followed the trade, shortly afterwards moving his newspaper paper to Washington, D.C., where, after some years under different ownership, it failed.

=== Haiti, Canada, Texas and Mexico—and Philadelphia ===
Besides traveling through many states of the United States to deliver anti-slavery lectures (reportedly the first to do so), Lundy visited Haiti twice (in 1825 and 1829); the Wilberforce Colony of freedmen and refugee slaves in Canada in 1830–1831 (perhaps in part avoiding controversy after publishing about Nat Turner's Rebellion); and Texas, in 1832 and again in 1833. Lundy also sought to find a suitable place outside the United States where emancipated slaves might be sent. Between 1820 and 1830, he traveled "more than 5000 miles on foot and 20,000 in other ways, visited 19 states of the Union, and held more than 200 public meetings." Slaveholders bitterly denounced him, and many non-slaveholders disapproved his anti-slavery agitation.

In 1836–1838 Lundy edited a new anti-slavery weekly, The National Enquirer, which the Pennsylvania Anti-Slavery Society had founded in Philadelphia, as well as wrote extensively about the troubles in Texas and Mexico, especially as they related to slavery. Lundy became a leading voice in denouncing the Texas Revolution as a method to perpetuate slavery in Texas in defiance of Mexico's ban on it. When former president John Quincy Adams came to Philadelphia on his birthday, July 11, 1836, Lundy escorted him to meet other Quakers, including James Mott and his wife Lucretia Mott. Under the editorship of John G. Whittier, Lundy's successor, that paper became The Pennsylvania Freeman.

Lundy purchased a farm near the Clear Creek Meeting House (the westernmost establishment of the Hicksite Friends), as well as the new village of Lowell, Illinois. He printed several issues of the re-established Genius of Universal Emancipation on a borrowed press in nearby Hennepin, Illinois.

== Death and legacy ==
Lundy died after an August fever and brief illness at his farm in Lowell, aged fifty. Shortly after his death, his family and friends in Philadelphia published his autobiographical Life Travels and Opinions of Benjamin Lundy. Lucretia Mott remembered him in her 1848 speech to the American Anti-Slavery Society in New York.

One hundred years later, a bronze plaque was dedicated to the pioneer abolitionist and placed at his gravesite. The tribute reads, "It was his lot to struggle, for years almost alone, a solitary voice crying in the wilderness, and, amidst all, faithful to his one great purpose, the emancipation of the slaves."

His house in Mount Pleasant is a National Historic Landmark.

SONNET.
TO BENJAMIN LUNDY, THE VETERAN ADVOCATE OF NEGRO EMANCIPATION.
Self-taught, unaided, poor, reviled, contemned
Beset with enemies, by friends betrayed;
As madman and fanatic oft condemned,
Yet in thy noble cause still undismayed !
Leonidas thy courage could not boast;
Less numerous were his foes, his band more strong;
Alone unto a more than Persian host
Thou hast undauntedly giv'n battle long.
Nor shalt thou singly wage th' unequal strife;
Unto thy aid with spear and shield I rush,
And freely do I offer up my life,
And bid my heart's blood find a wound to gush!
New volunteers are trooping to the field
To die we are prepar'd—but not an inch to yield.

— William Lloyd Garrison

== Publications ==
- Chandler, Elizabeth Margaret (1845). The Poetical Works of Elizabeth Margaret Chandler, with a memoir of her life and character, by Benjamin Lundy. Philadelphia and New York: T. E. Chapman (Philadelphia); Baker, Crane and Day (New York).
- Lundy, Benjamin (1845). Anti-Texass [sic] Legion: Protest of some free men, states and presses against the Texass rebellion, against the laws of nature and of nations. "Delenda est Texas". Albany, New York. Archived from the original on 2006-03-23.
- Lundy, Benjamin (1837). The war in Texas, a review of facts and circumstances, showing that this contest is a crusade against Mexico, set on foot and supported by slaveholders, land-speculators, &c., in order to re-establish, extend, and perpetuate the system of slavery and the slave trade (2nd, "revised, and enlarged" ed.). Philadelphia.
