= Elihu Embree =

American abolitionist and journalist (1782-1820)

Elihu Embree (November 11, 1782 – December 4, 1820) was an abolitionist in Jonesborough, Tennessee, and publisher of Manumission Intelligencier (later renamed as The Emancipator). Founded in 1819, it was the first newspaper in the United States devoted exclusively to the cause of abolishing slavery.

== Early life ==
Embree was the son of a Quaker minister and his wife who moved from Pennsylvania to Washington County in East Tennessee around 1790. (Quakers in Pennsylvania had largely opposed slavery, and some ministers traveled in the South after the American Revolution urging planters to free their slaves.) He had an older brother Elijah. It is not known where Elihu attended school, although some accounts suggest he was taught by noted Presbyterian minister, Samuel Doak, at Washington College Academy.

== Business activities ==
Elihu Embree was involved in the iron manufacturing business with his brother, Elijah. Elijah married well, to a granddaughter of the first Tennessee governor, John Sevier, who was re-elected to several terms. When Elijah Embree died in 1846, he owned 70,000 acres (280 km^{2}) of mineral-rich land, much of it in Bumpus Cove, Tennessee, valued at nearly one million dollars.

Elihu became known as a visionary and was considered a poor business manager. During his early life, he owned slaves, having purchased several and come into possession of a number of others held by his wife (property rules meant that a man controlled his wife's property). Around 1812, however, Embree freed all their slaves, at a considerable financial sacrifice. Soon afterward he became an ardent anti-slavery advocate along with his brother and they remained so until their death.

== Publishing career ==
In 1819, after securing the approval and cooperation of the Manumission Society of Tennessee, of which he was an active member, and later leader. Embree began to publish a weekly anti-slavery paper at Jonesborough, Tennessee under the name of the Manumission Intelligencier. Its first issue appeared in March. Very little is known about the paper. Of the fifty or more issues that were published, fewer than a dozen copies are known to have survived to the twentieth century.

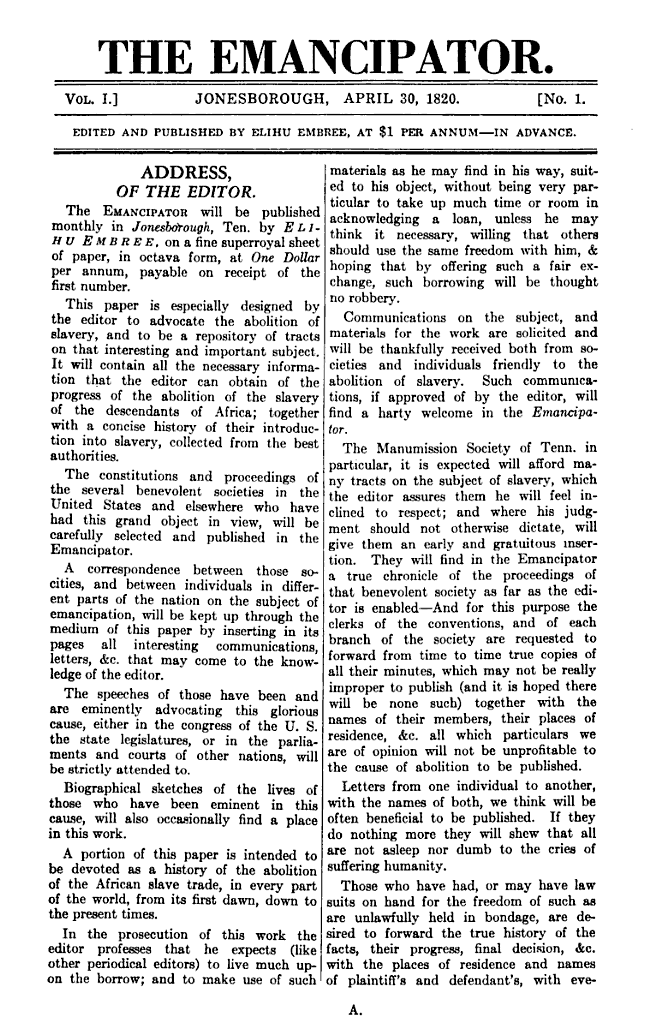
The first issue of The Emancipator

In April 1820, Embree changed the paper from a weekly to a monthly format and renamed it as The Emancipator, though it remained under the same editor. The first issue carried an editorial saying the paper was intended to "advocate the abolition of slavery, and to be a repository of tracts on that interesting and important subject." Its article condemned slavery and slaveholders in the strongest terms, and forcefully pointed out the evils of the system of slavery.

Although the abolitionist paper was published in a slave state, The Emancipator achieved remarkable popularity. At the time of Embree's early death in 1820 it could boast of 2,000 paying subscribers, which was probably as large as that of any newspaper in either Tennessee or Kentucky. The border states had numerous organizations and members devoted to the abolition of slavery. East Tennessee was an area of strong anti-slavery sentiment at this time. But, the paper also encountered considerable opposition from those who supported slavery. Embree was noted as being extremely harsh on condemning slavery and even compared to the well known abolitionist William Lloyd Garrison.

The Emancipator was published for only eight months because Embree died, aged 38, on December 4, 1820. He was diagnosed with "bilious fever". Later Garrison's The Liberator would be published in 1831. By then, there would be 25 anti-slavery societies in Tennessee.

A full collection of the journal, comprising one hundred and twelve pages, was reprinted in 1932 by B. H. Murphy. In 1974, the Tennessee legislature honored the memory of Elihu Embree for his work on behalf of the "universal and equal liberty of all men".
