= Friends Meetinghouse (Mount Pleasant, Ohio) =

Historic church in Ohio, United States

- U.S. National Register of Historic Places
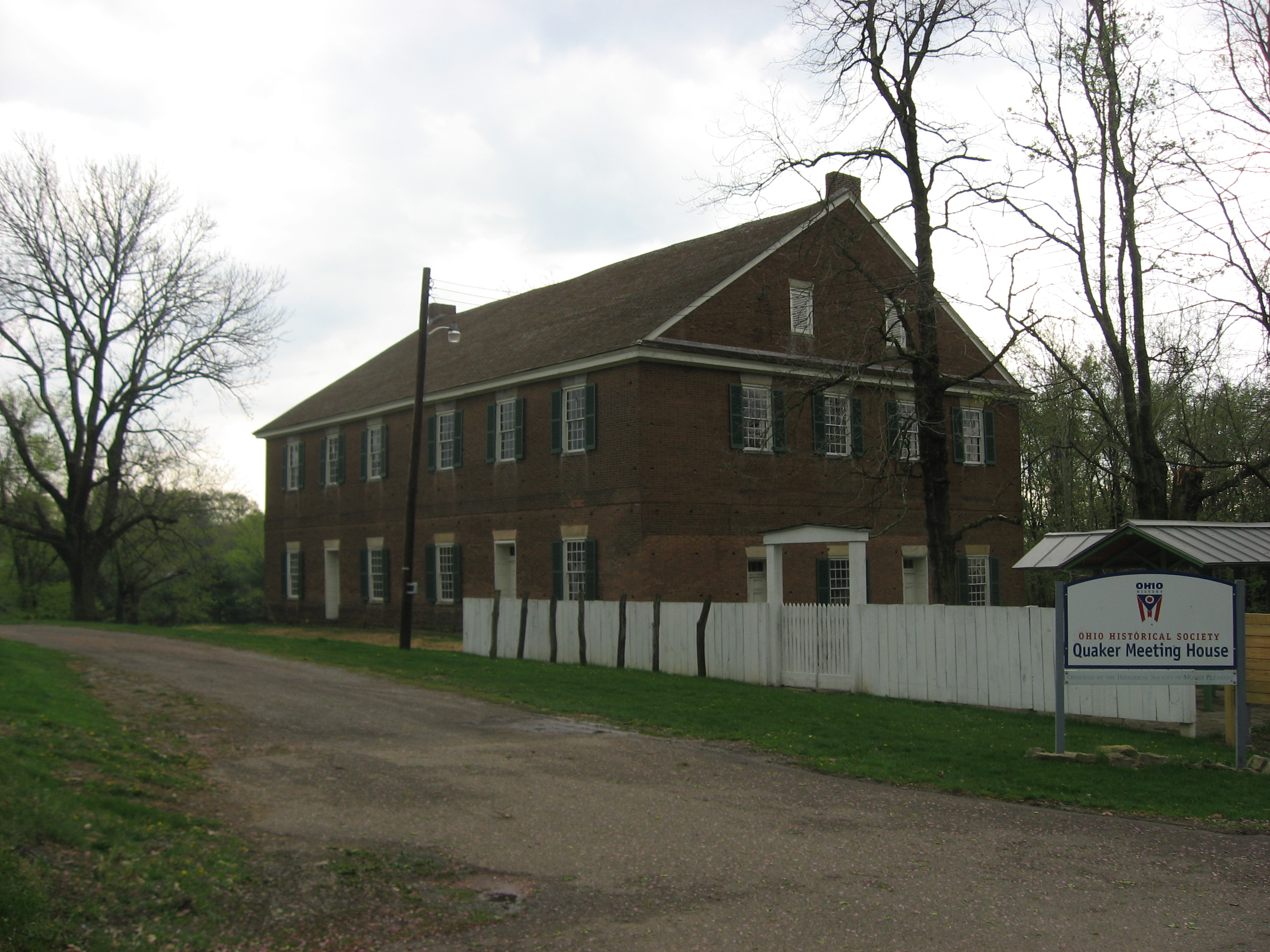

- Location within Ohio Location within the United States
- Location: Near OH 150, Mount Pleasant, Ohio
- Coordinates: 40°10′25″N 80°48′10″W
- Area: 5 acres (2.0 ha)
- Built: 1814
- NRHP reference No.: 70000504
- Added to NRHP: November 10, 1970

Friends Meetinghouse is a historic Quaker meeting house near OH 150 in the village of Mount Pleasant, Ohio. It was built in 1814 and added to the National Register of Historic Places in 1970 and was the first Quaker yearly meeting house west of the Alleghenies.

Mount Pleasant was named a National Historic Landmark District for its association with the antislavery movement in the years leading up to the American Civil War. It is home to five documented Underground Railroad "stations." The village celebrated its 200th anniversary with tours, special displays and programs on Saturday, Aug. 2 and Sunday, Aug. 3, 2014. On Saturday, Aug. 2, there was a special program in the 1814 Quaker Meeting House with The Hon. John D. Ong, former U.S. Ambassador to the Kingdom of Norway and descendant of Jacob Ong (1760–1849), the Meeting House "carpenter" or in modern terms contractor. Jacob Ong was a minister and was remembered by a friend thus: 'He usually had a message for the people, his theme was always love. In the earnestness of his soul he would deliver the message, while tears would trickle down his furrowed cheeks. Trembling from head to foot, he would exhort young and old to love the Lord and one another.'"

The building is now owned by the Ohio History Connection and managed by the Mount Pleasant Historical Society as the Quaker Yearly Meeting House.
