= Genius of Universal Emancipation =

American abolitionist newspaper

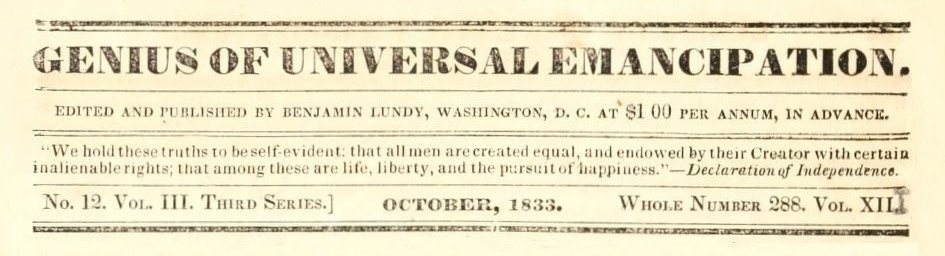
- Nameplate from the October 1833 issue
- Type: Weekly newspaper
- Founder: Benjamin Lundy
- Deputy editor: William Lloyd Garrison (1829–c. 1831)
- Founded: June 1821; 205 years ago
- Ceased publication: 1839
- Political alignment: Abolitionist
- Language: English
- City: Mount Pleasant, Ohio, then Greeneville, Tennessee, then Baltimore, Maryland
- Country: United States

The Genius of Universal Emancipation was an abolitionist newspaper founded by Benjamin Lundy in 1821, in Mount Pleasant, Ohio.

== History ==
The newspaper was originally Elihu Embree's The Emancipator in 1820, before Lundy purchased it the following year. Lundy's contributions reflected his Quaker views, condemning slavery on moral and religious grounds and advocating for gradual emancipation and the resettlement of freed slaves in other countries, including Haiti, Canada, and Liberia. The paper attracted few readers in Ohio, so Lundy moved his base of operations to Greeneville, Tennessee, in an attempt to spread his ideas in a slave state. Although the paper gained national circulation through twenty-one states, Tennessee slave owners were not very receptive to Lundy's publications, and he realized the newspaper could have greater impact on the East Coast. In 1824, he moved The Genius to Baltimore, Maryland, where it would spend most of its publishing life. The paper would later be moved to Washington and then Philadelphia, and Lundy continued to publish irregularly until his death in 1839.

== Impact and legacy ==
the Genius of Universal emancipation was one of the most significant abolitionist newspapers of the early 1800s, helping shape the abolitionist movement that we know today.Although it didn't have as many readers as later abolitionist newspapers, it had a major role in spreading the ideas of the abolitionist movement and helped develop figures that later pushed the movement forward. Under the leadership of Benjamin Lundy The Genius became one of the first national newspapers to advocate for the ending of slavery, which revived a movement that was dying after the American revolution.

One of the most important things that the newspaper is credited for is launching the career of William Lloyd Garrison. Garrison would go on to be one of the most well known and prominent abolitionist in The United States. Lundy served as a mentor for Garrison which helped change his views to a more radical stance on abolishing slavery . Garrison went from writing about the negatives of slavery to calling for immediate emancipation.Garrisons later publication The liberator used The Genius of Universal emancipation as a foundation for its message . This shows the lasting impact that the publication had on the abolitionist movement.

The genius also helped expand the reach of the abolitionist movement . Lundy moved the publication all across the United States including Ohio, Tennessee, Maryland, and Pennsylvania this movement helped spread the conversation of emancipation across not only free states but also slave states.This was crucial in spreading the conversation of emancipation in places where the opposition to slavery was way less common and even places where it was dangerous to speak about emancipation publicly.

While promoting emancipation the newspaper also preached the horrors of slavery. Lundy used religion to connect to peoples morals. Lundy's own writings in the newspaper emphasized the injustice of slavery and attempted to persuade readers by appealing to their sense of humanity and fairness.

The impact of Lundy's work was also recognized by others in the abolitionist movement. After his death, publications such as The Liberator described him as a dedicated and selfless advocate against slavery, highlighting the respect he earned among his peers.

Despite its contributions, the Genius of Universal Emancipation faced financial instability, political resistance, and limited resources, which ultimately affected its consistency and longevity. Nevertheless, it still remains one of the most important early examples of abolitionist journalism and emancipation advocacy in the United States.

== Influence on abolitionist thought ==
In addition to its historic impact, The Genius of Universal Emancipation played a major role in shaping abolitionist beliefs in the United States.Instead of just pushing for political change right away, Benjamin Lundy used the newspaper to write about slavery in a moral and philosophical way. His writings stressed religious values, human equality, and moral responsibility, pushing readers to see slavery as a moral wrong instead of just a political issue. This way of thinking was in line with his Quaker beliefs and helped to frame abolitionism as a movement based on conscience and moral change.

The newspaper also helped shape the early debates within the abolitionist movement itself. Lundy supported gradual emancipation and colonization efforts, which were common views among early reformers. However The Genius helped make a place where people could talk about things and hear different points of view, which led to the emergence of different ways of thinking. This is especially clear in the growth of William Lloyd Garrison. His work with Lundy shaped his early ideas, but later he took a more radical stance and called for immediate emancipation. The difference between Lundy's gradualism and Garrison's immediatism shows a bigger change in abolitionist ideas that was partly caused by discussions in magazines like The Genius.

In addition, the newspaper was a big part of how people talked about slavery in public. Lundy's writing style was mostly based on moral persuasion. He used descriptive language and personal appeals to show how slavery hurt people. The publication helped shape how readers thought about and understood slavery by framing it as a violation of basic human rights and Christian values. This helped create a growing body of antislavery thought that stressed moral arguments as well as political ones.

Primary sources from the time also show how Lundy's ideas were understood and accepted by people who lived at the same time as him. After he died, The Liberator published an obituary and a sonnet that painted him as a selfless and morally driven reformer who was very dedicated to the abolitionist cause. These accounts show how Lundy's work influenced the movement's values and language, especially its emphasis on moral conviction and personal sacrifice.

The Genius of Universal Emancipation also talks about how important print culture was in shaping reform movements in the early 1800s. As a publication that was read in many places, it helped spread ideas and made the language and arguments used by abolitionists more consistent. The newspaper served not merely as a source of information but also as an instrument for shaping public comprehension and fostering critical reflection on slavery.

Overall, The Genius had a big impact on how people thought about and talked about abolitionism. The newspaper helped the abolitionist movement grow by pushing moral arguments, encouraging ideological debate, and shaping early reform discourse. This was before the movement got a lot of attention from the general public.

== Editors ==
=== Benjamin Lundy ===
Benjamin Lundy, considered by some as "The First Abolitionist", was born to Quaker parents in 1789, in Sussex County, New Jersey. Lundy was taught to be opposed to slavery at a young age. While working as a saddle maker in Wheeling, Virginia, Lundy witnessed the slave trade for the first time, thus beginning his career in abolitionism. At the time, the abolitionist movement had been losing momentum. In 1815, Lundy revived the movement by establishing The Union Humane Society, which sought gradual emancipation of slaves through legislation and to provide aid to freed slaves. Six years later, Lundy founded The Genius. The paper alternated between monthly and weekly publications, as Lundy spent much of his time traveling to give speeches or to other countries for potential freed slaves. While on a trip to Haiti, Lundy's wife, Esther, died in childbirth, leaving him a single father of twins. As Lundy found himself with less time to devote to the paper, he met William Lloyd Garrison, and offered him an editing position. After Lundy and Garrison parted ways over the "Black List," Lundy began working closely with John Quincy Adams to establish freedman's colonies in Mexico, after Mexico abolished slavery completely in 1829. However, Texas revolted in 1836, and effectively ended any chances of such colonies being established. During this time, Lundy hired multiple assistants to keep the paper going, and its publishing regularity faltered. He moved the paper to Washington, then to Philadelphia, where it stopped publishing in 1835. In Philadelphia, he began publishing another newspaper, The National Enquirer and Constitutional Advocate for Liberty, until it too stopped scheduled publications and fell into financial trouble. Lundy decided to move to Illinois, where his family was, and was invited to store his work and belongings in Pennsylvania Hall, which was used to host meetings about political topics, especially slavery. Lundy attended the Anti-Slavery Convention of American Women in Pennsylvania Hall, but on the second day of the convention, pro-slavery pamphlets began circulating the city advocating for "property rights", and on the fourth day of the convention, disaster struck when an angry mob burned down Pennsylvania Hall, including all of Lundy's work and possessions. He moved to Putnam County, Illinois, built a small house and printing shop, and reestablished The Genius. Later that year, Lundy became very ill and he died on August 22, 1839, in debt and with few physical records of his abolitionist work remaining.

=== William Lloyd Garrison ===
In 1829, Lundy recruited the young William Lloyd Garrison to join him in Baltimore, Maryland, and help him edit the paper. Garrison's experience as a printer and newspaper editor allowed him to revamp the layout of the paper and free Lundy to spend more time traveling as an antislavery speaker. The two first met in Boston on one of Lundy's speaking tours; this meeting marked the start of Garrison's career in abolitionism. Initially, Garrison shared Lundy's gradualist views, but he eventually became convinced of the need to demand immediate and complete emancipation. Lundy and Garrison continued to work together on the paper in spite of their differing views, agreeing simply to sign their editorials to indicate who had written it.

One of the regular features that Garrison introduced during his time at the Genius was "the Black List," a column devoted to printing short reports of "the barbarities of slavery—kidnappings, whippings, murders." One of Garrison's "Black List" columns reported that a shipper from Garrison's hometown of Newburyport, Massachusetts—one Francis Todd—was involved in the slave trade, and that he had recently had slaves shipped from Baltimore to New Orleans on his ship Francis. Todd filed a suit for libel against both Garrison and Lundy, filing in Maryland in order to secure the favor of pro-slavery courts. The state of Maryland also brought criminal charges against Garrison, quickly finding him guilty and ordering him to pay a fine of $50 and court costs. (Charges against Lundy were dropped on the grounds that he had been traveling and not in control of the newspaper when the story was printed.) Garrison was unable to pay the fine and was sentenced to a jail term of six months. He was released after seven weeks when the antislavery philanthropist Arthur Tappan donated the money for the fine, but Garrison had decided to leave Baltimore and he and Lundy mutually agreed to part ways. Garrison returned to New England, and soon began his own abolitionist newspaper, The Liberator. Garrison would go on to lead the abolitionist movement right up until the Emancipation Proclamation. Even though Garrison and Lundy parted ways after his arrest, when Lundy died, Garrison said, "It is to Benjamin Lundy that I owe all that I am as a friend of the slave."

== Extant holdings, reprints, and digital facsimiles ==
- Genius of Universal Emancipation

(microfilm); OCLC 724131743
OCLC 33288934, 8044567
Filmed from the New York Public Library (microfiche); OCLC 29802581
ProQuest (microfilm); OCLC 1101004651
Gale (microfiche); OCLC 80908750
Gale (online); OCLC 607363086
OCLC 503837629, 191121541

- Genius of Universal Emancipation and Baltimore Courier

ProQuest (online); OCLC 50282266

- The Genius of Universal Emancipation and Quarterly Anti-Slavery Review (1837–1839)

OCLC 30553799

== See also ==
- Abolitionist publications
