= Mount Pleasant, Ohio =

- Village
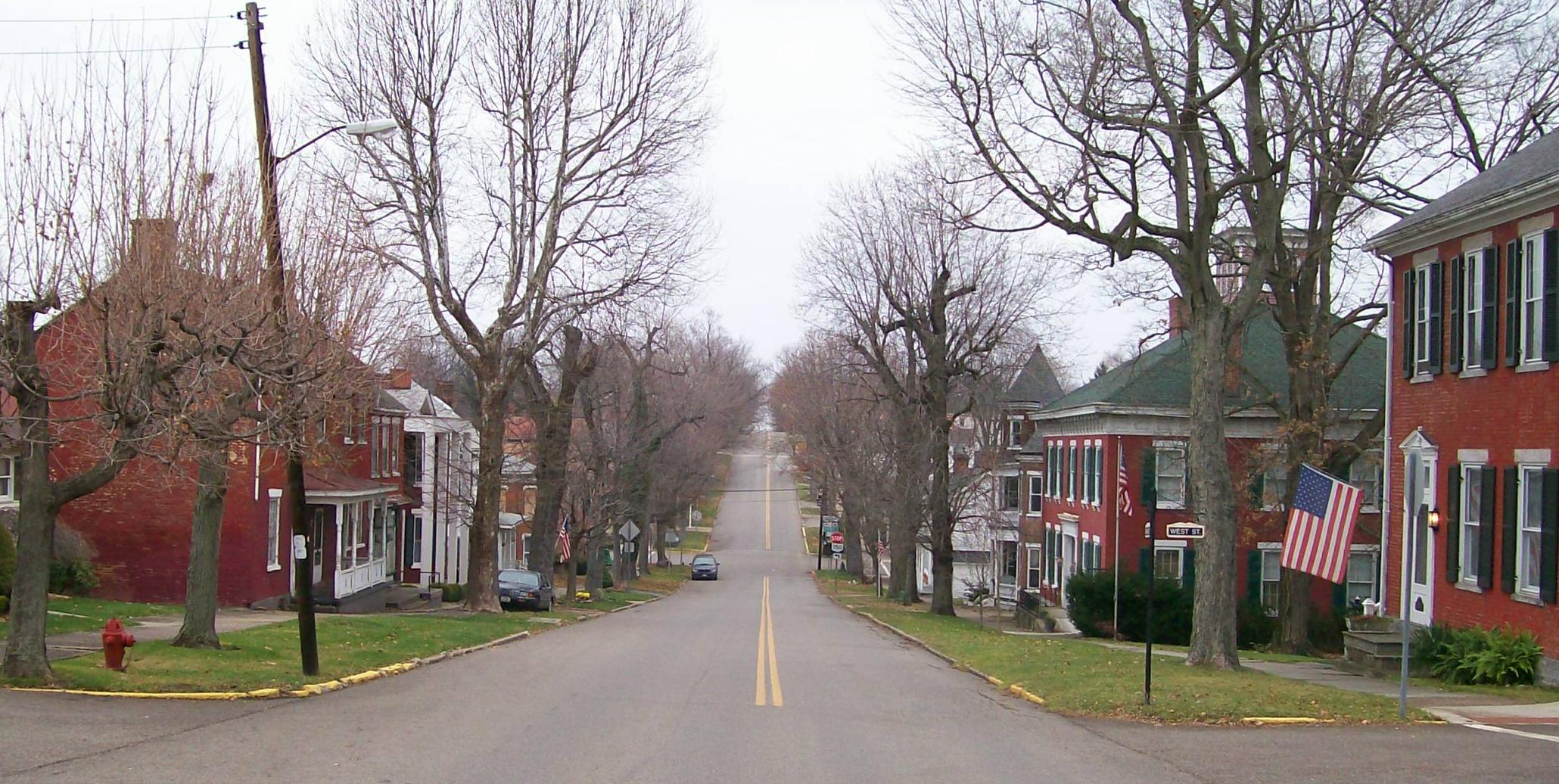
- Mount Pleasant Historic District

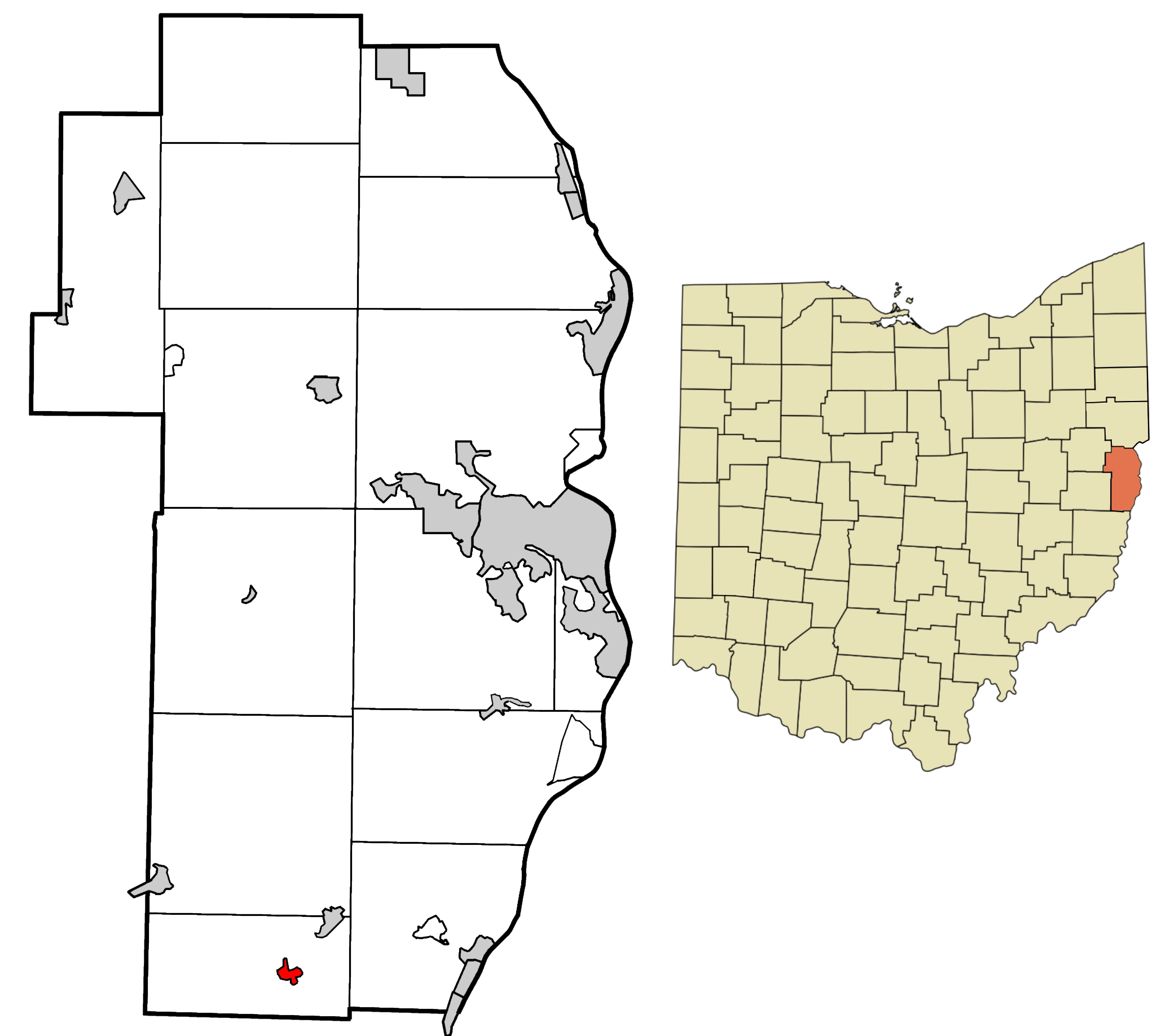
- Location of Mount Pleasant in Jefferson County, Ohio

- Location within Ohio Location within the United States
- Coordinates: 40°10′33″N 80°47′59″W
- Country: United States
- State: Ohio
- County: Jefferson
- Township: Mount Pleasant

Area
  - Total: 0.25 sq mi (0.66 km^{2})
  - Land: 0.25 sq mi (0.66 km^{2})
  - Water: 0 sq mi (0.00 km^{2})
- Elevation: 1,217 ft (371 m)

Population (2020)
  - Total: 394
  - Density: 1,545.8/sq mi (596.85/km^{2})
- Time zone: UTC-5 (Eastern (EST))
  - Summer (DST): UTC-4 (EDT)
- ZIP code: 43939
- Area code: 740
- FIPS code: 39-52976
- GNIS feature ID: 2399415

Mount Pleasant is a village in Jefferson County, Ohio, United States. The population was 394 at the 2020 census. It is part of the Weirton–Steubenville metropolitan area. Founded in 1803 by anti-slavery Quakers, the village was an early center of abolitionist activity and a well-known haven for fugitive slaves on the Underground Railroad.

== History ==
Mount Pleasant was laid out in 1803. It was named for its scenic landscape. An early variant name was Jesse-Bobtown. In 1802 Nathan Updegraff of the Pennsylvanian Op den Graeff family settled north in Mount Pleasant. His family belonged to the 19th-century Quaker families of Ohio and produced a lot of Quaker Ministers and elders.

In 1817, Quaker Charles Osborn established The Philanthropist, the first newspaper in the country advocating the abolition of slavery, in Mount Pleasant. The abolitionist James Birney would later adopt the name The Philanthropist for his anti-slavery newspaper, published in Cincinnati and distributed in New Richmond, Ohio beginning in 1836.

In 1821, the Quaker abolitionist Benjamin Lundy started publishing The Genius of Universal Emancipation, another abolitionist newspaper, also in Mount Pleasant. The paper eventually moved to Baltimore, Maryland. Lundy's house is a National Historic Landmark. Nathan Updegraffs son David Benjamin Updegraff (1789–1864) was a conductor of the Underground Railroad in Mount Pleasant.

Most of the village has been designated a historic district, the Mount Pleasant Historic District; it too is a National Historic Landmark.

== Geography ==
According to the United States Census Bureau, the village has a total area of 0.26 square miles (0.67 km^{2}), all land.

== Demographics ==
Historical population
Census	Pop.	Note	%±
1810	246		—
1820	421		71.1%
1830	554		31.6%
1850	755		—
1870	563		—
1880	693		23.1%
1890	644		−7.1%
1900	626		−2.8%
1910	701		12.0%
1920	635		−9.4%
1930	674		6.1%
1940	717		6.4%
1950	760		6.0%
1960	656		−13.7%
1970	635		−3.2%
1980	616		−3.0%
1990	498		−19.2%
2000	535		7.4%
2010	478		−10.7%
2020	394		−17.6%
U.S. Decennial Census

=== 2010 census ===
As of the census of 2010, there were 478 people, 192 households, and 143 families living in the village. The population density was 1,838.5 inhabitants per square mile (709.8/km^{2}). There were 226 housing units at an average density of 869.2 per square mile (335.6/km^{2}). The racial makeup of the village was 97.7% White, 0.8% African American, 0.4% Native American, 0.6% Asian, and 0.4% from two or more races. Hispanic or Latino of any race were 0.2% of the population.

There were 192 households, of which 32.8% had children under the age of 18 living with them, 59.9% were married couples living together, 10.9% had a female householder with no husband present, 3.6% had a male householder with no wife present, and 25.5% were non-families. 22.9% of all households were made up of individuals, and 15.1% had someone living alone who was 65 years of age or older. The average household size was 2.49 and the average family size was 2.89.

The median age in the village was 44.5 years. 20.9% of residents were under the age of 18; 6.7% were between the ages of 18 and 24; 23.2% were from 25 to 44; 32.2% were from 45 to 64; and 16.9% were 65 years of age or older. The gender makeup of the village was 48.3% male and 51.7% female.

=== 2000 census ===
As of the census of 2000, there were 535 people, 201 households, and 158 families living in the village. The population density was 2,136.6 inhabitants per square mile (824.9/km^{2}). There were 222 housing units at an average density of 886.6 per square mile (342.3/km^{2}). The racial makeup of the village was 97.57% White, 1.31% African American, 0.37% Asian, and 0.75% from two or more races. Hispanic or Latino of any race were 0.19% of the population.

There were 201 households, out of which 34.8% had children under the age of 18 living with them, 64.2% were married couples living together, 11.9% had a female householder with no husband present, and 20.9% were non-families. 19.9% of all households were made up of individuals, and 14.9% had someone living alone who was 65 years of age or older. The average household size was 2.66 and the average family size was 3.03.

In the village, the population was spread out, with 24.9% under the age of 18, 7.3% from 18 to 24, 26.4% from 25 to 44, 23.4% from 45 to 64, and 18.1% who were 65 years of age or older. The median age was 40 years. For every 100 females there were 96.0 males. For every 100 females age 18 and over, there were 88.7 males.

The median income for a household in the village was $43,750, and the median income for a family was $46,591. Males had a median income of $39,821 versus $19,688 for females. The per capita income for the village was $15,647. About 7.7% of families and 9.3% of the population were below the poverty line, including 12.9% of those under age 18 and 5.0% of those age 65 or over.

== Education ==
Public education in the village of Mount Pleasant is provided by the Buckeye Local School District.

== Notable people ==
- William Lawrence, Republican politician
- Benjamin Lundy, abolitionist
- Stephen Mason Merrill, Methodist clergyman
- Stephen Dee Richards, Old West serial killer
- Benjamin Stanton, sixth lieutenant governor of Ohio
- David Benjamin Updegraff (1789–1864), conductor of the Underground Railroad, minister of Friends church
- Jonathan T. Updegraff (1822–1882), physician and politician, served as a U.S. representative from Ohio from 1879 to 1882
- Moses Fleetwood Walker, first African-American professional baseball player
