= Old Main Library (Cincinnati) =

Demolished library building in Cincinnati

Coordinates: 39.1032°N 84.5138°W

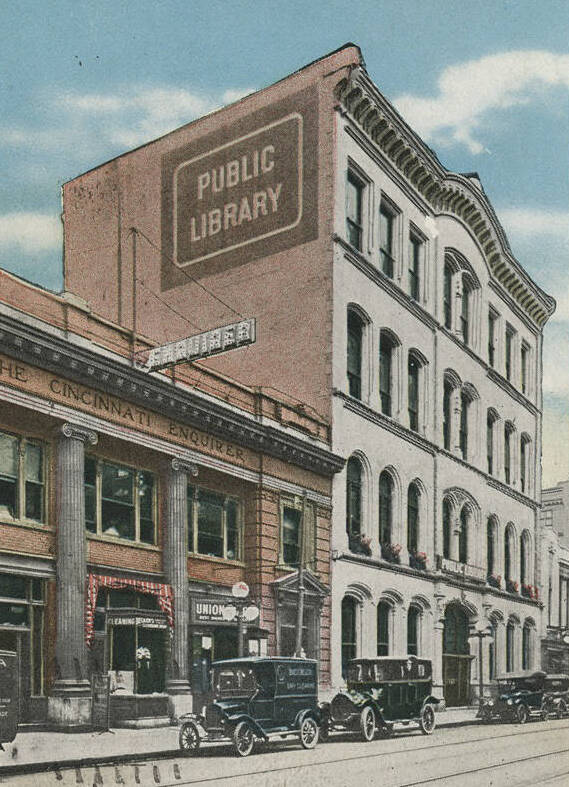
- Front building of the Old Main in 1918
- Interactive map of the Old Main Library area

General information
- Status: Demolished
- Location: 629 Vine Street, Cincinnati, Ohio, United States
- Completed: 1874
- Opened: 1870
- Demolished: 1955
- Cost: $383,594.53 (equivalent to $9,278,193 in 2025)

Technical details
- Floor count: 4

Design and construction
- Architect: James W. McLaughlin
- Other designers: William Frederick Poole

The Old Main Library was a public library building in Cincinnati, Ohio, United States. Opened in 1870 and demolished in 1955, it served as the main library of the Cincinnati and Hamilton County Public Library (CHPL) system for 85 years.

In 1868, the Public Library of Cincinnati, then located in the Ohio Mechanics' Institute, purchased an opera house in construction after its owner went bankrupt. It hired architect James W. McLaughlin to convert the building, located on Vine Street at the corner of 6th Street, into a new library. Librarian William Frederick Poole significantly assisted McLaughlin with the design. A first portion of the Old Main opened on 9 December 1870, although construction had yet to be fully completed. The rest was inaugurated in 1874. The main hall, which featured cast-iron alcoves, spiral staircases and a wide skylight ceiling, was praised by the media at the time.

Although often described as beautiful, the Old Main was considered congested and impractical. Its estimated capacity of 300,000 volumes was exceeded within two decades. In 1955, it had 1.5 million books, which had to be stacked three deep on bookshelves or stored in basements, the attic, or other branches. This led to various complications, including the difficulty of quickly producing requested books and the deterioration, from repeated flooding, of the volumes that were stored in the sub-basement. Other challenges included insufficient lighting, poor ventilation, lack of seating, and elevator and fire safety. Because coal furnaces heated the building, dedicated "book cleaners" had to be hired to clean the soot off of the books and stacks.

Calls for a new library emerged in the 1920s and the project was officialized in 1944. A location for the "New Main" was found two blocks away from the Old Main, which closed its doors on 27 January 1955. It was demolished from March to June of that year. Because of its sturdiness, it was said to have "died hard", requiring 100 days of wrecking and a crew of 50 to 75 men. It was reportedly the largest demolition contract of Cincinnati's history at that time. Today, the site of the Old Main is occupied by an office building and a parking garage. Decades after the library's demolition, images of its interiors garnered significant public interest online.

== Background ==
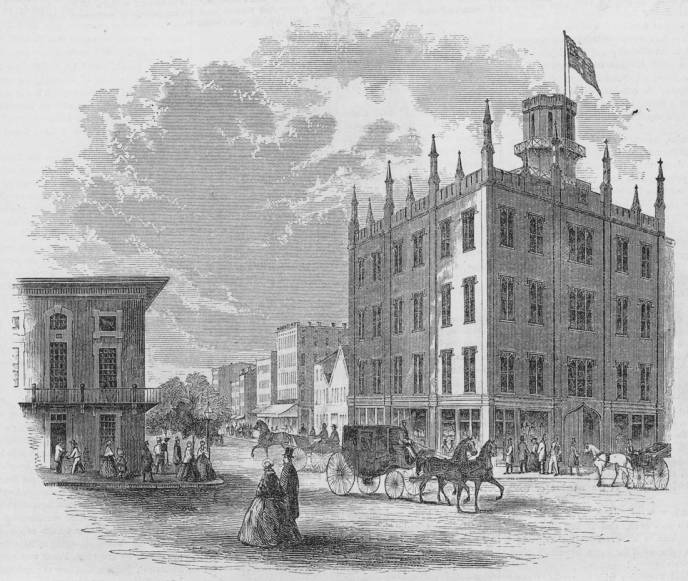
The Ohio Mechanics' Institute, at 6th and Vine Street, in 1856

The Ohio Common Schools Act, passed on 14 March 1853, included provisions for the establishment of school libraries in Ohio. It allowed Rufus King, the president of the Board of Education, to found a central public library in Cincinnati's Central School. The library was located on Longworth Street, a street which no longer exists. In 1856, it was moved to the second floor of the Ohio Mechanics' Institute, at the corner of Vine Street and 6th Street, now the location of the Terrace Plaza Hotel. The Public Library of Cincinnati, as it was then called, eventually outgrew the space, leading its board to purchase a nearby Vine Street building which was under construction. The four-story building was intended to be an opera house before the project went bankrupt in 1868. It was still unfinished when it was acquired by the Public Library, at the cost of $83,000 (equivalent to $2,007,563 in 2025).

== Construction and design ==
To complete and convert the building, the board of the Public Library of Cincinnati hired local architect James W. McLaughlin, who later also designed the Cincinnati Art Museum. Librarian William Frederick Poole is credited as contributing key ideas to the design, notably the cast-iron reading room in the main hall as well as the implementation of central heating and an elevator.

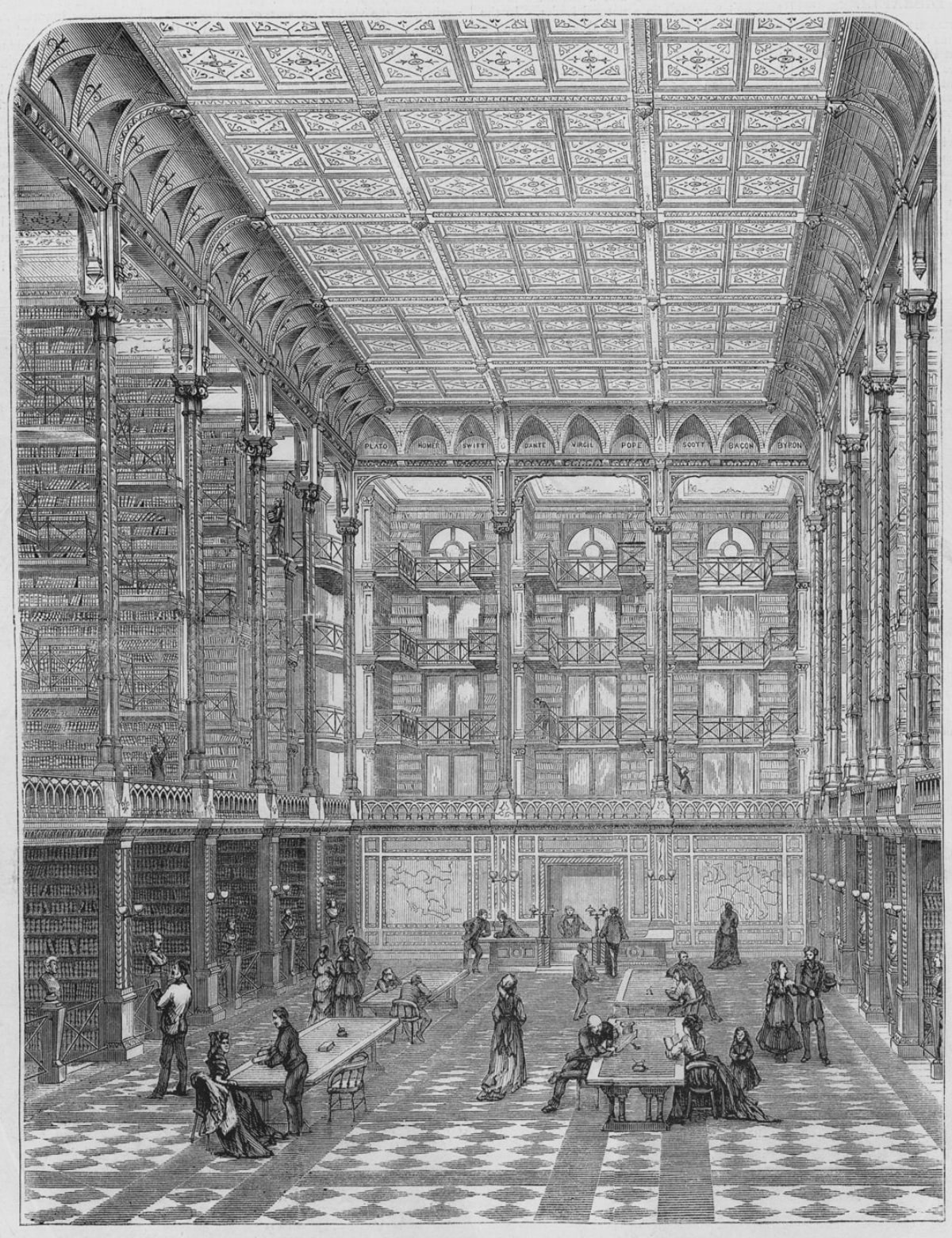
Drawing of the main hall as published in Harper's Weekly for the 1874 opening of the building

The Old Main Library consisted of three buildings: the front building, originally intended as the opera house, the middle building, and the main hall. The main hall featured cast-iron alcoves, spiral staircases and a wide skylight ceiling. Its marble floor featured a checkerboard pattern. At the entrance of the Old Main, busts of William Shakespeare, John Milton, and Benjamin Franklin welcomed visitors.

=== Opening ===
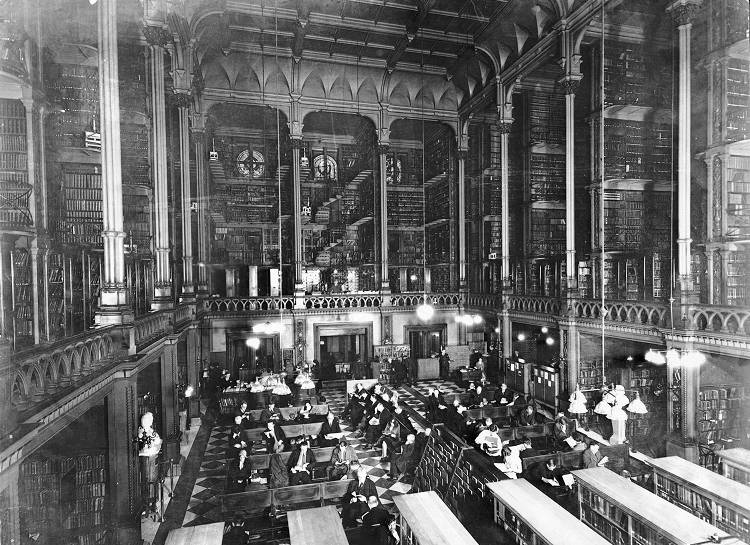
Main hall of the Old Main, circa 1899

The front building was the first building of the Old Main to open, on 9 December 1870. The other two buildings opened more than three years later, on 25 February 1874. George H. Pendleton, a past Democratic candidate for vice president, gave a speech at the inauguration. The main hall received architectural praise from the media upon its opening. Harper's Weekly complimented its "graceful and carefully studied architecture, which provides that no portion of the shelving is deprived of a proper amount of light". The Cincinnati Enquirer wrote that one was "impressed not only with the magnitude and beauty of the interior, but with its adaptation to the purpose it [was] to serve".

In total, the lot and building cost $383,594.53 (equivalent to $9,278,193 in 2025). Initially known simply as the Public Library of Cincinnati, it became the "Main Library" in 1906 when branches were added to the system, following a donation by the industrialist Andrew Carnegie. It is known as the "Old Main" in opposition to the "New Main", which replaced it in 1955.

=== Rooms ===
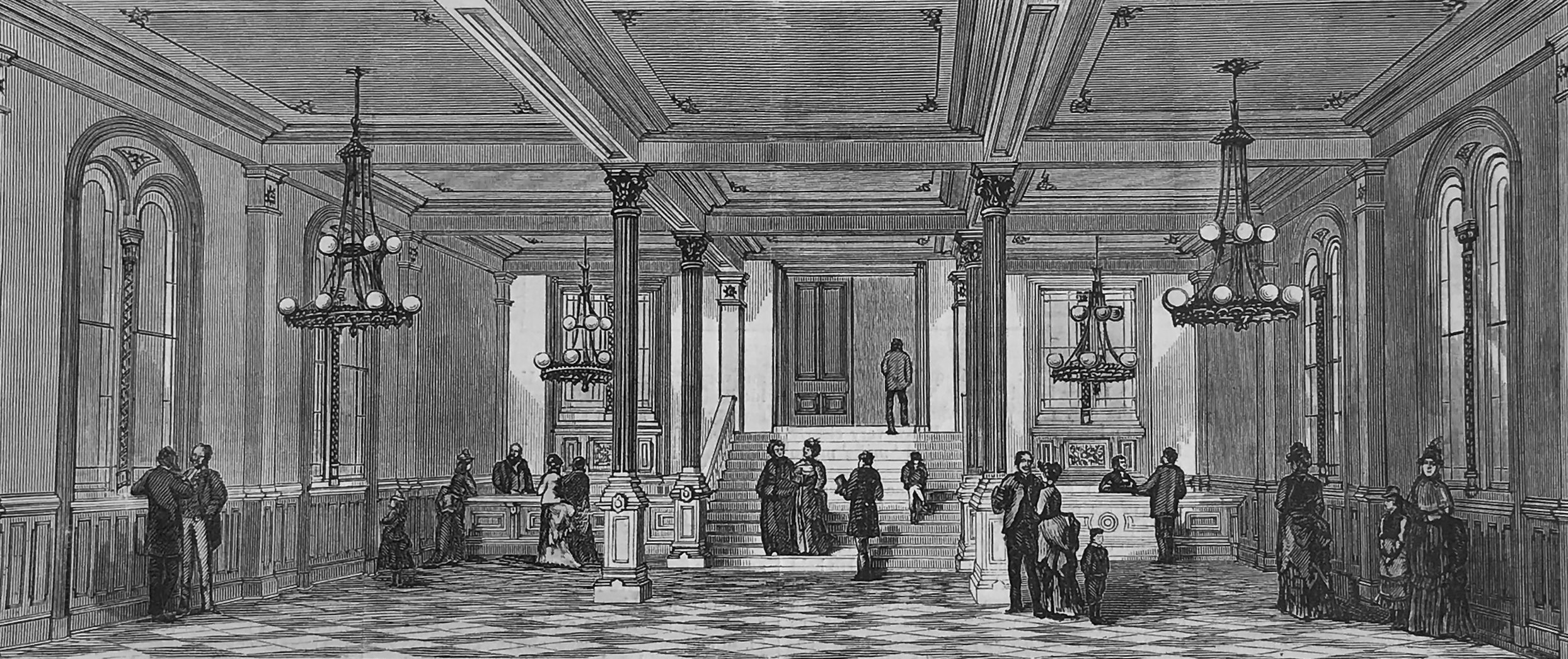
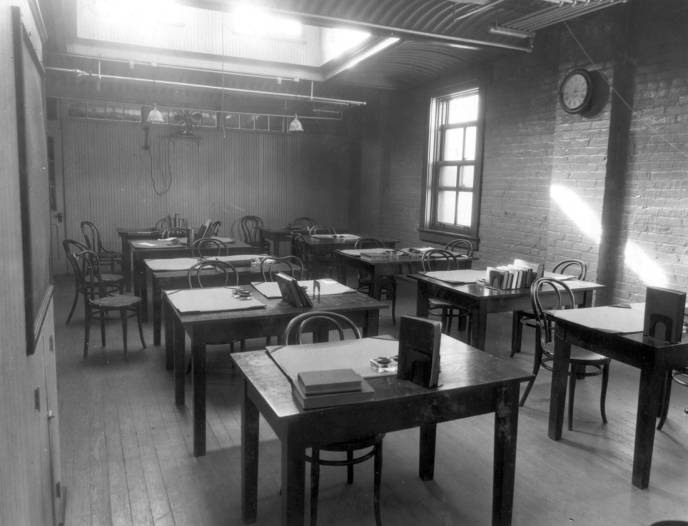
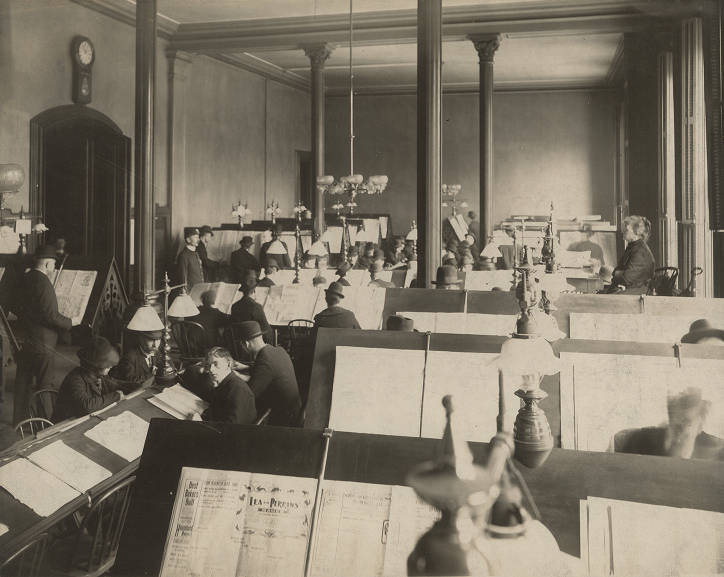
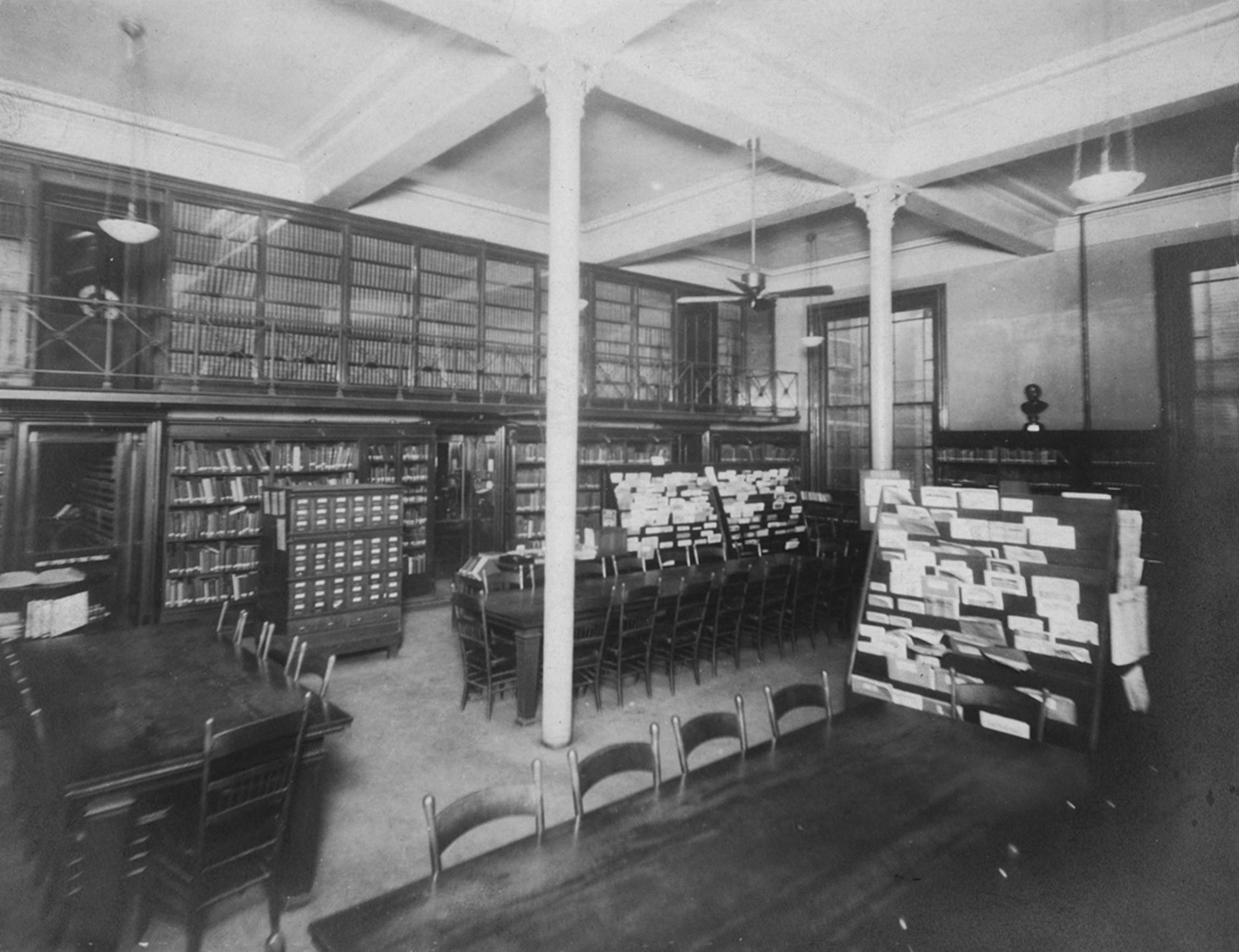
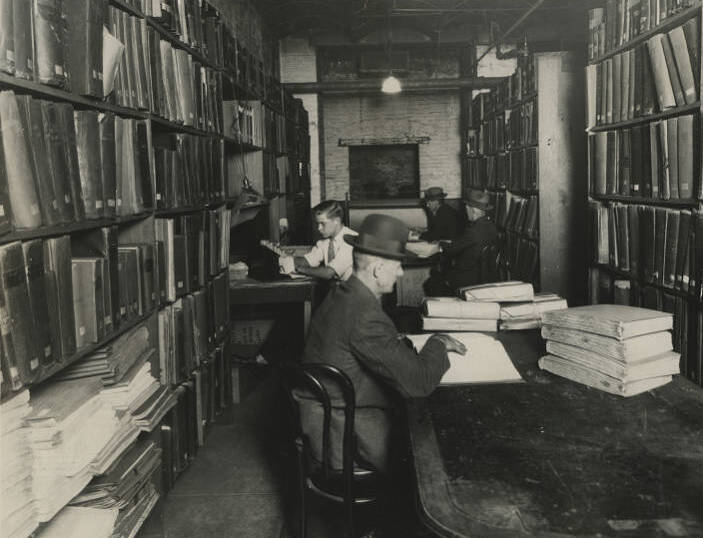
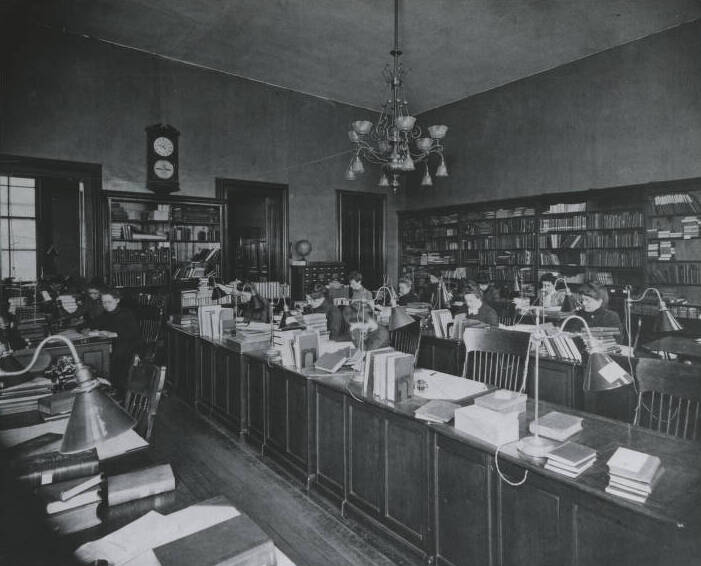
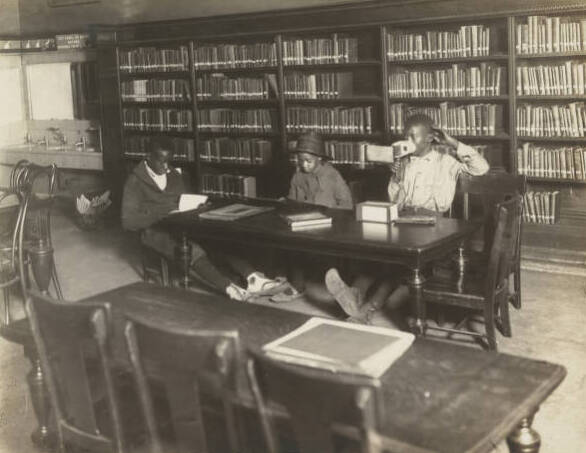
Top row (left to right): vestibule, training room, newspaper room
Bottom row (left to right): useful arts room, reading room for the blind, catalog department, children's room

Besides the large reading room in the main hall, the Old Main was made up of multiple smaller rooms. On the third floor were four "art rooms" containing thousands of rare and valuable volumes from the United States and Western Europe. In the fourth-floor attic was the Training Class, an in-house library school founded by librarian Laura Smith. The Old Main also held a large collection of lantern slides, which it used for a popular series of travel lectures. By 1928, the collection had grown to over 45,000 slides, covering such topics as travel, science, art, and architecture.

== Challenges ==
While the Old Main was praised for its interior design, it was reportedly congested and impractical. The library exceeded its estimated capacity of 300,000 books in 1894, two decades after it opened. By the time it moved in 1955, it held 1.5 million volumes. Books had to be stacked three deep on the shelves, or stored in the basement, sub-basement, attic, or at other branches. More valuable ones were kept in a back vault. Because of the congestion, visitors sometimes had to wait up to three days before receiving a requested book. Moreover, books that were stored in the sub-basement were damaged due to repeated flooding, and the smell of damp paper in the room was reportedly so strong that librarians were not allowed in for more than 20 minutes. On the bookshelves, the weight of books was such that the third and fourth floors became too weak to support them. The library's lantern slide collection also grew so heavy that building inspectors requested it be lowered from the third floor to the first.

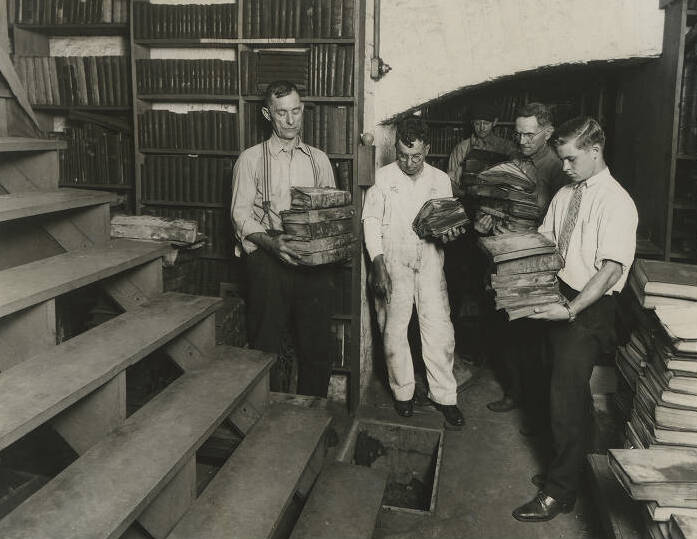
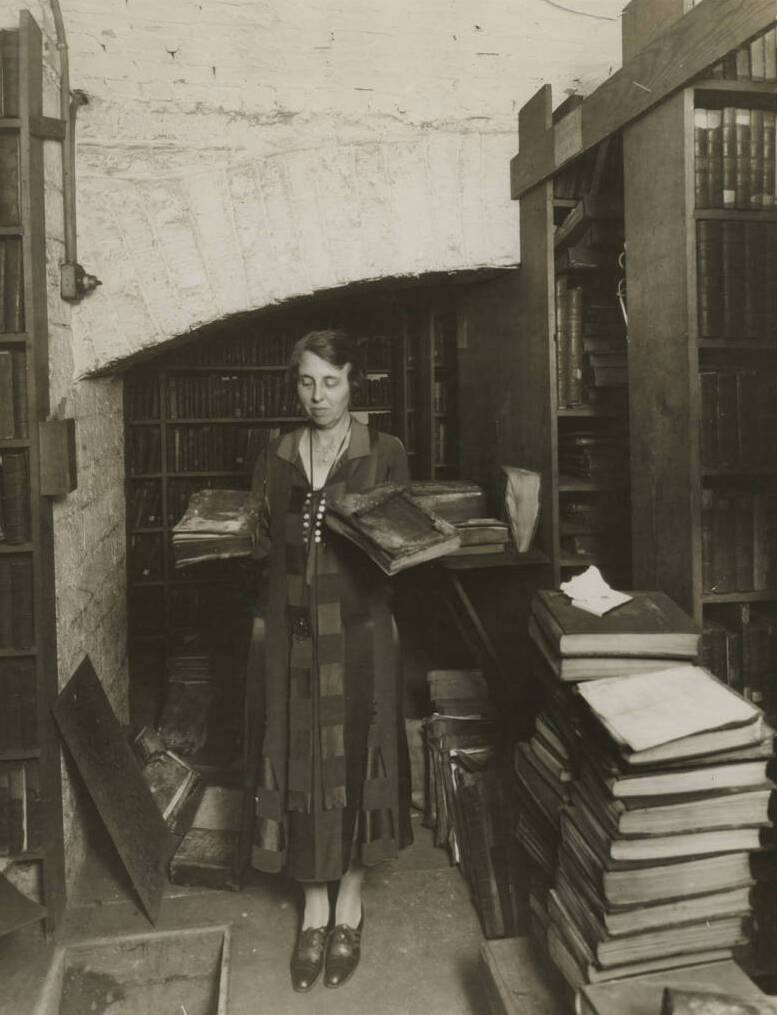
Damaged books in the sub-basement, 1926

Because the Old Main was heated by coal furnaces, books and stacks were often covered in soot and had to be cleaned by dedicated "book cleaners". In the summer, the lack of air conditioning and small amount of windows created a hot and humid atmosphere. The few windows also led to poor lighting, even after electric lighting replaced gas. Other challenges included poor ventilation, faulty plumbing, and lack of seating.

The building was said to be dangerous. Only pages were allowed to pull books from the stacks and re-shelve them, and at least two of them died in elevator accidents. A fire in the building might have also been difficult to contain and highly deadly. In 1937, it was estimated that close to 1,000 people might have been in the building at a given moment in the winter: 150 staff and 800 visitors.

== Demolition ==
Calls for a new library emerged in the 1920s, but it took until 1944 for the bond issue to be approved. A new location for the library was found two blocks away, at the corner of 8th and Vine streets. Preparations for the move began in December 1954, with library staff measuring off the Old Main's 1.5 million books in lengths of 30 inches — the length of the cartons in which they would eventually be placed — and giving each book a color-coded label corresponding to a specific location on the shelves on the "New Main". When the time came to pack up the volumes, the operation took a week. The Old Main closed on 27 January 1955, after 85 years as the main library of Cincinnati. The New Main opened four days later, on 31 January 1955.

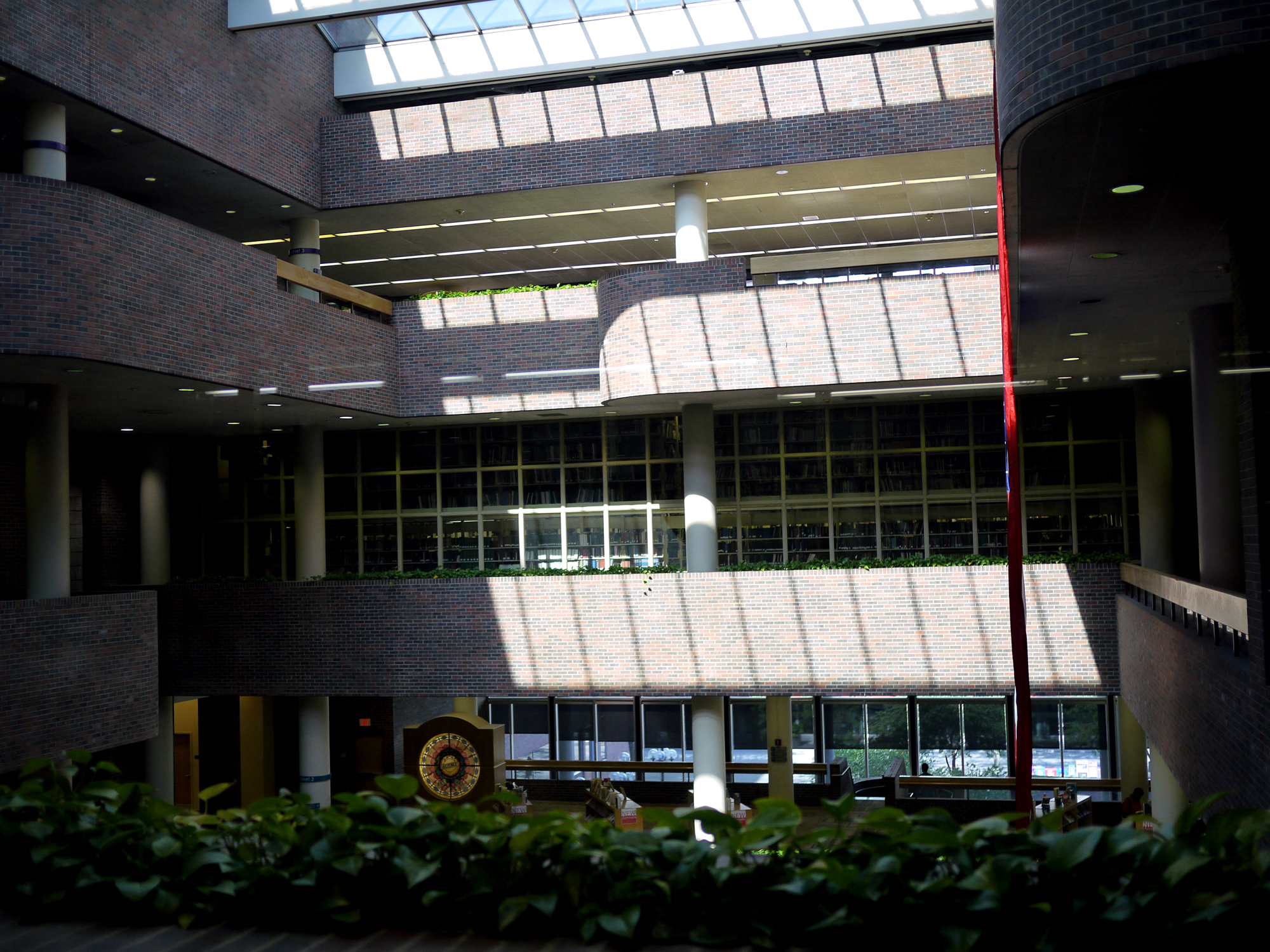
The "New Main" is located two blocks away from where the Old Main stood

Demolition of the Old Main began on 1 March 1955 and was carried out by the Cleveland Wrecking Company. The company's vice president was quoted as saying the building would "die hard" because of its sturdiness. He also suggested that the demolition contract was the largest of Cincinnati's history at that time. A crew of 50 to 75 men and the Cleveland Wrecking Co.'s heaviest equipment were required for the operation. It took 100 days, ending in mid-June 1955.

=== Legacy ===
After the demolition of the Old Main, the site was paved and turned into a parking lot. Currently, it is occupied by an office building and a parking garage. The three busts that were located over the entrance of the Old Main were preserved and transferred to the garden of the New Main. In 1982, that building was expanded to include an atrium and skylight, similarly to the Old Main and its main hall. Decades after the Old Main was demolished, it gained newfound public interest when black-and-white photos of its interiors became widely circulated online.

== Gallery ==
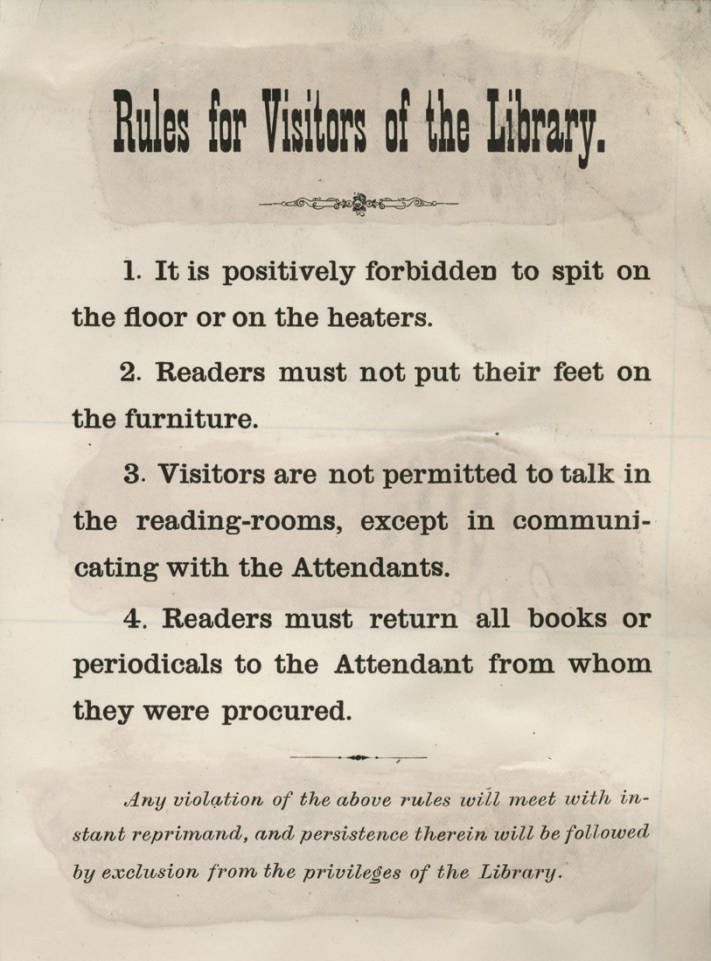
"Rules for Visitors of the Library", 1875

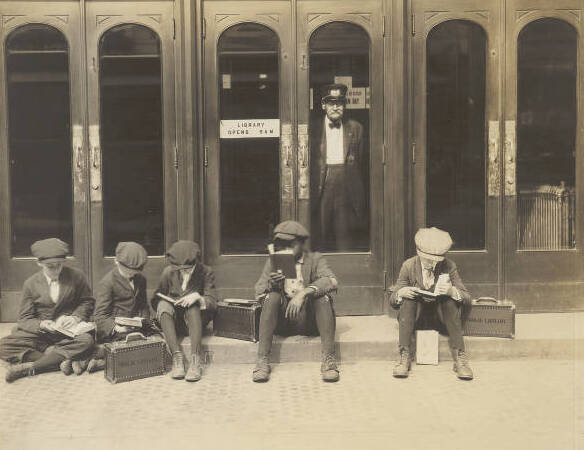
Children waiting for the library to open, 1923

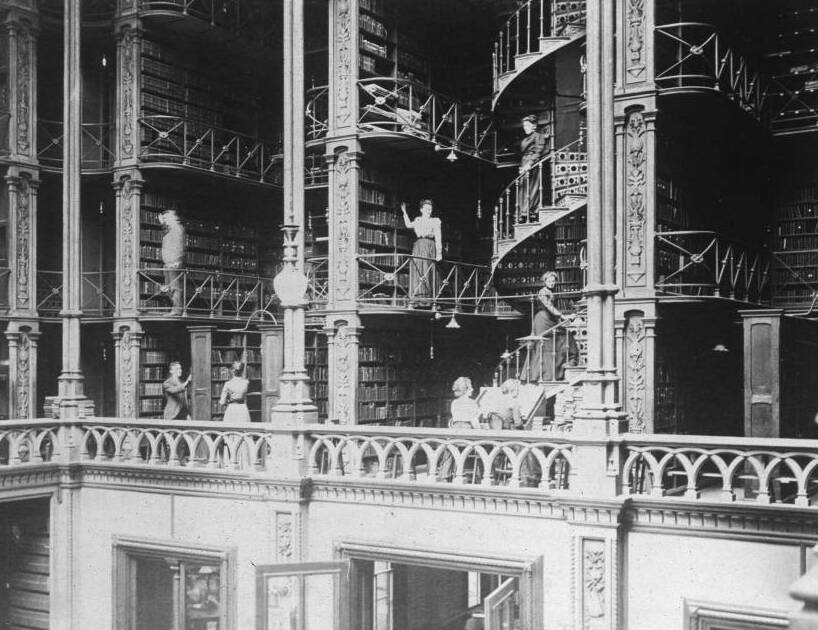
Main hall gallery, 1899

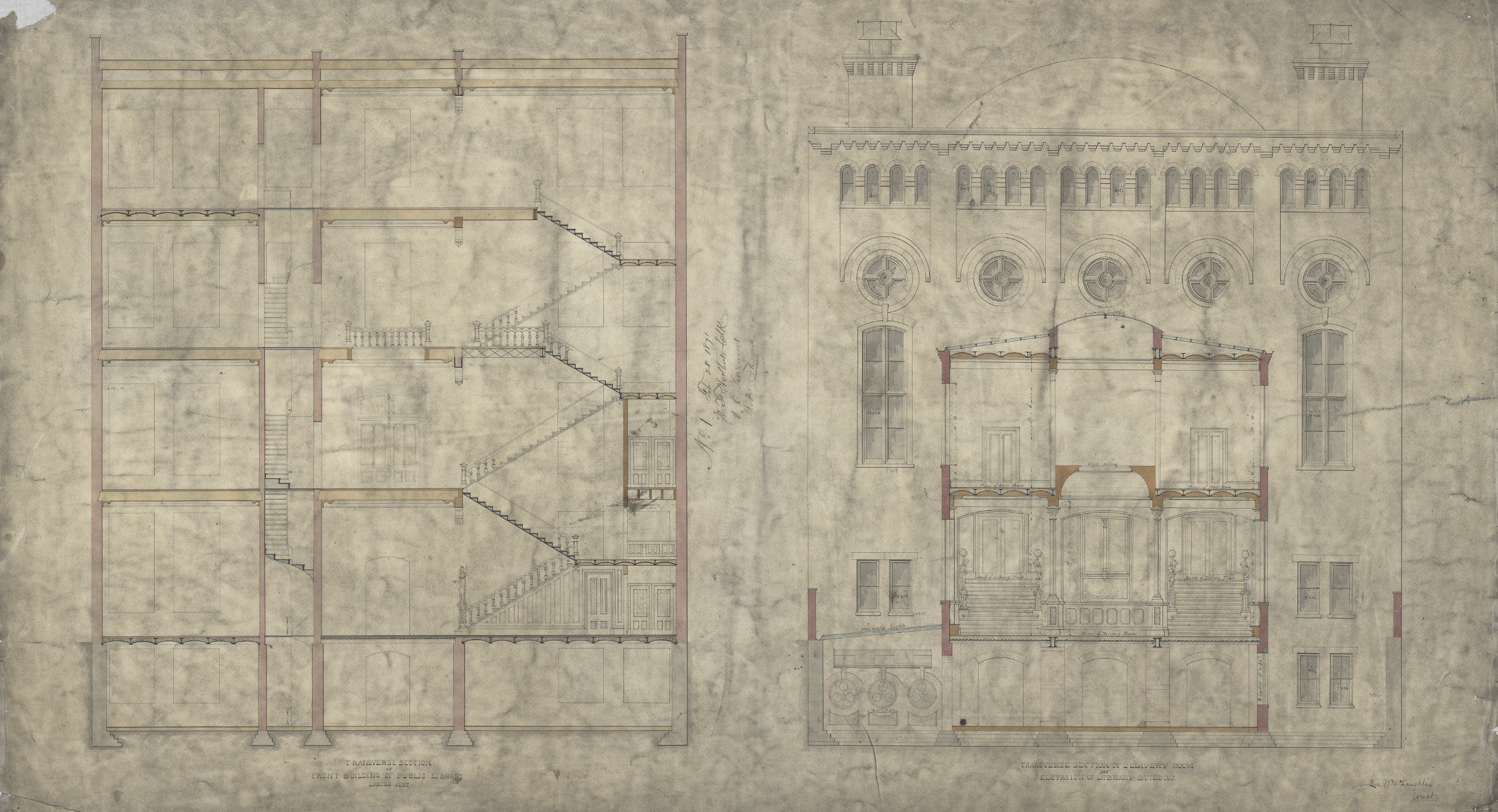
Original plan of the front building by James W. McLaughlin, 1871

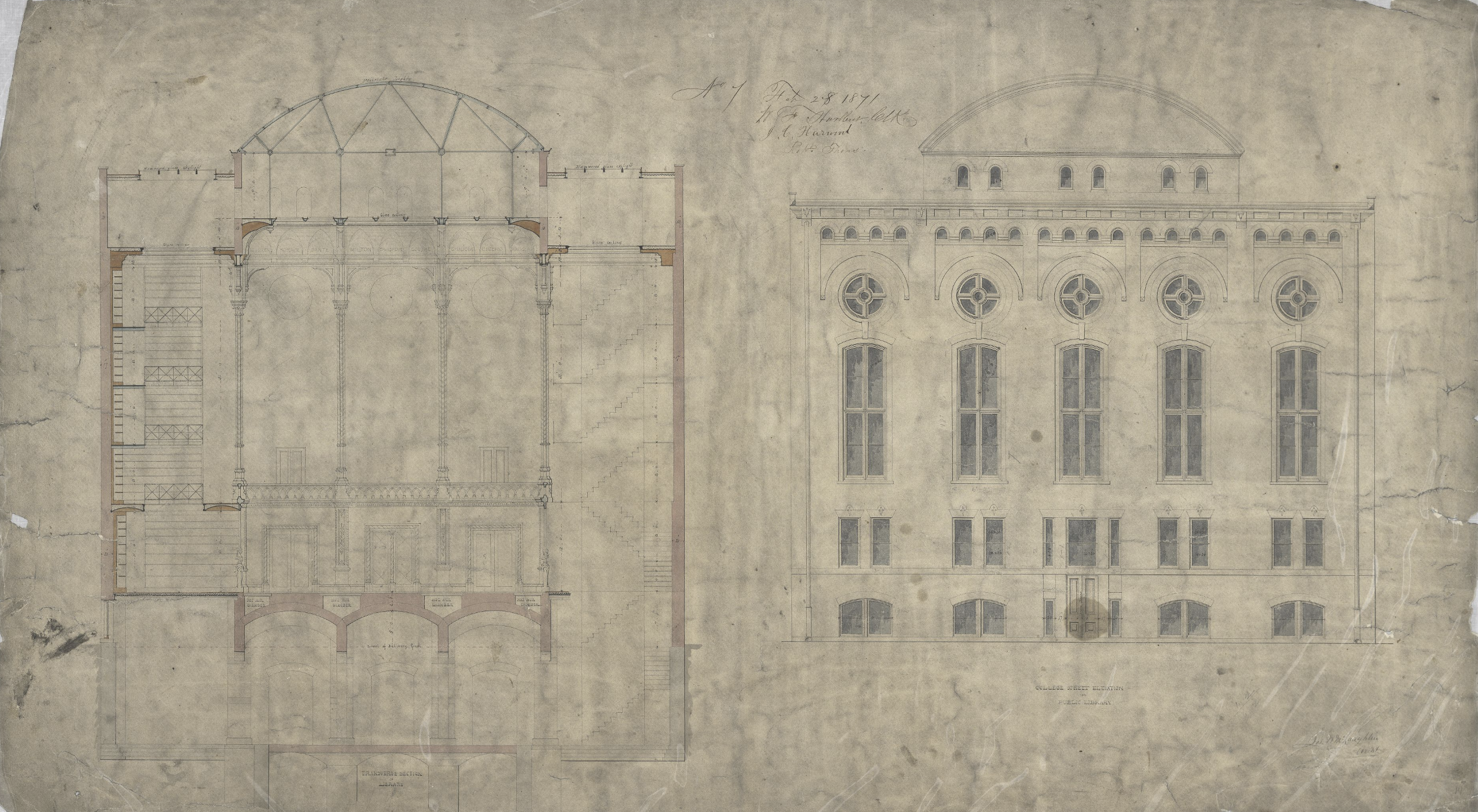
Original plan of the College Street facade by McLaughlin, 1871

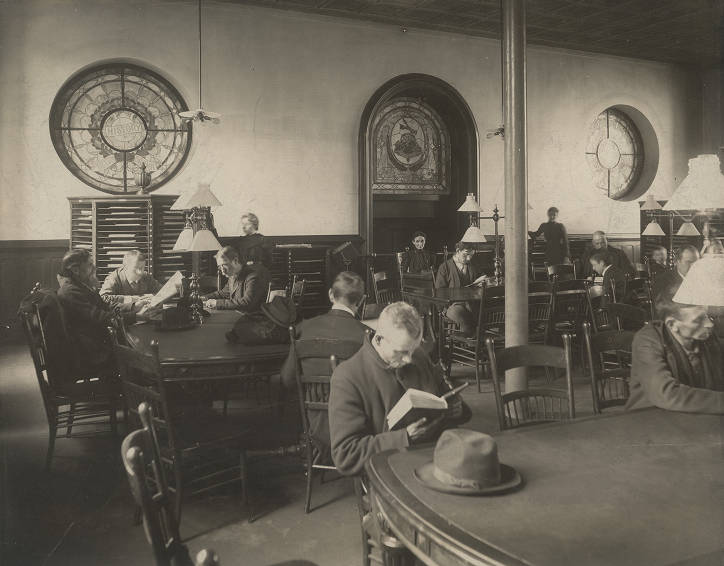
Readers, 1899

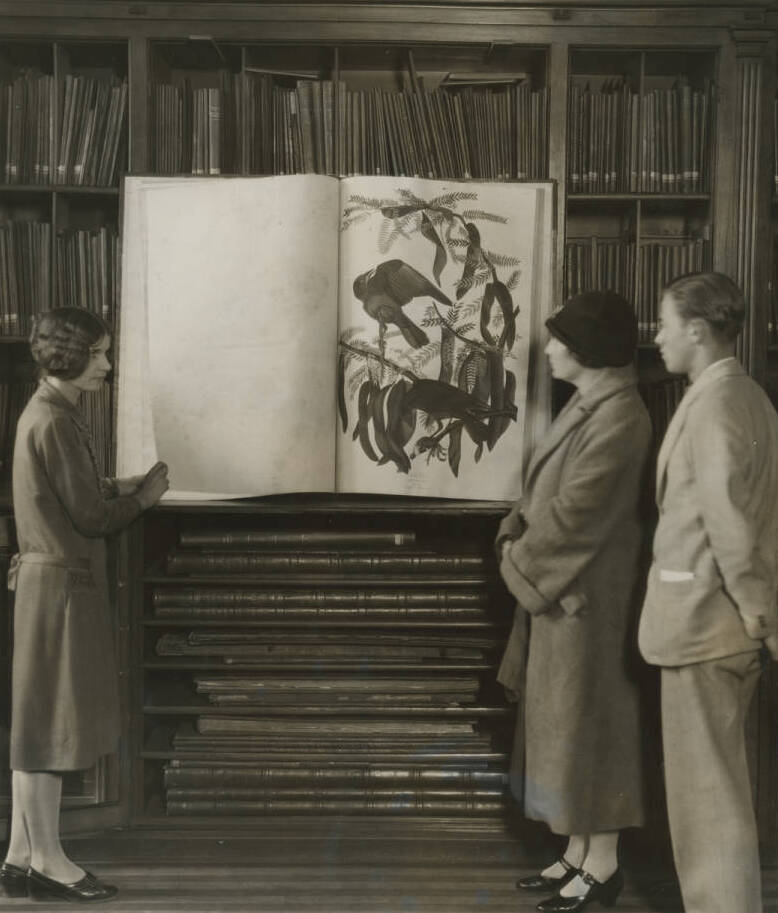
Collection of original John James Audubon folios, 1926

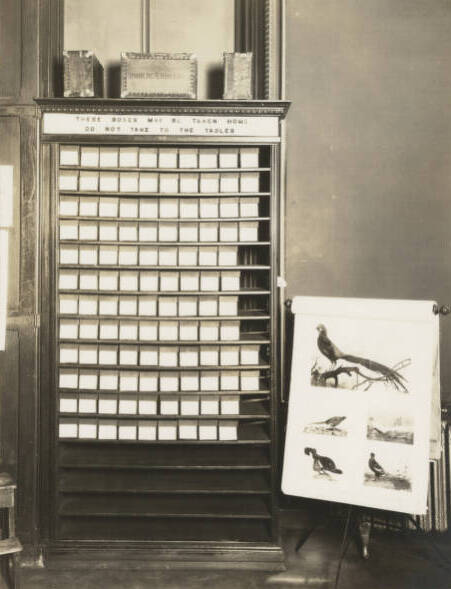
Stereograph shelves, 1923

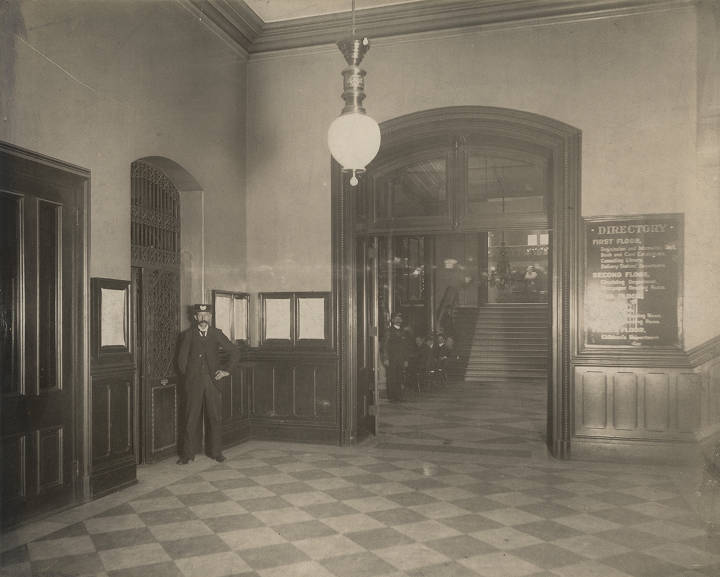
Old Main employee, 1899

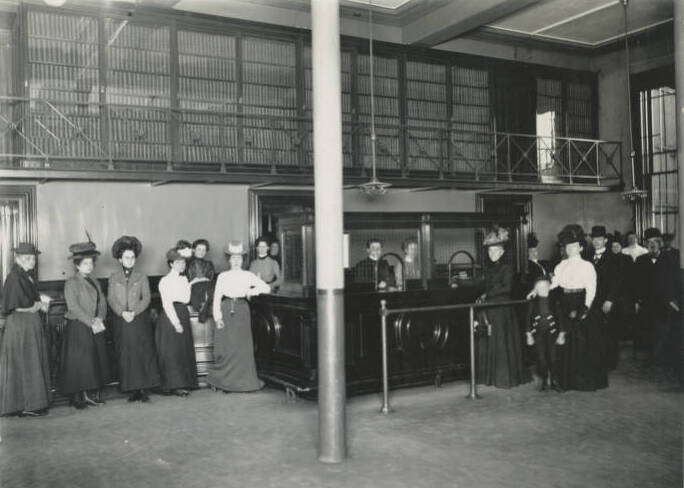
Charging booth, 1900

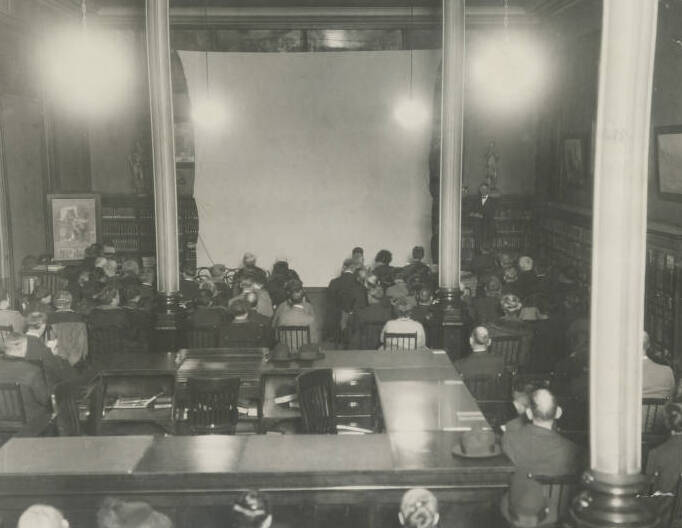
Children's room turned into an improvised auditorium, 1926

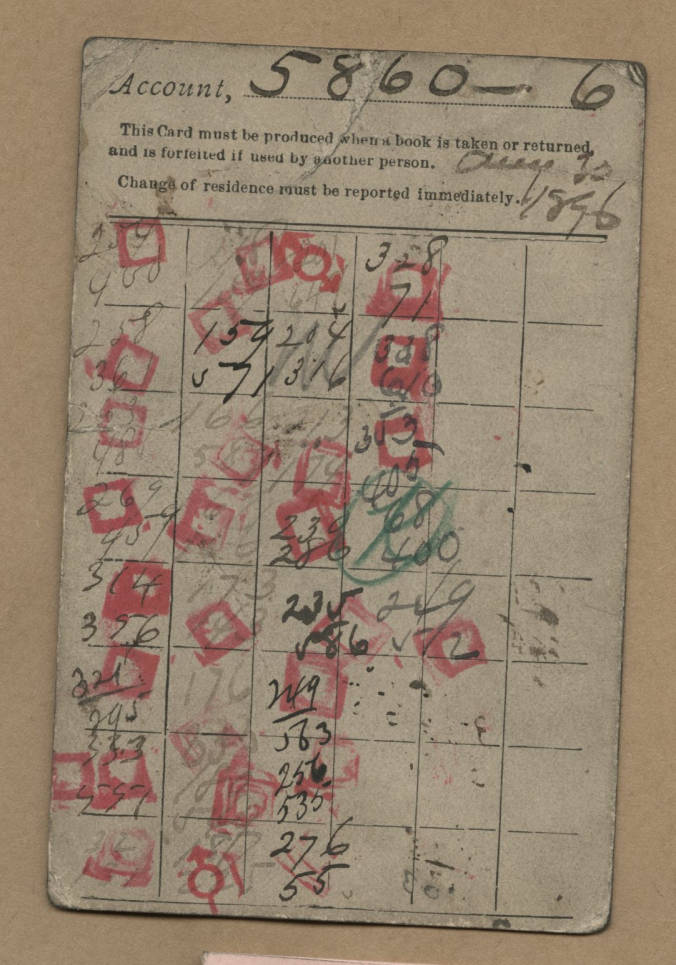
Library card, 1896
