= Sir Alfred T. Goshorn House =

- U.S. National Register of Historic Places
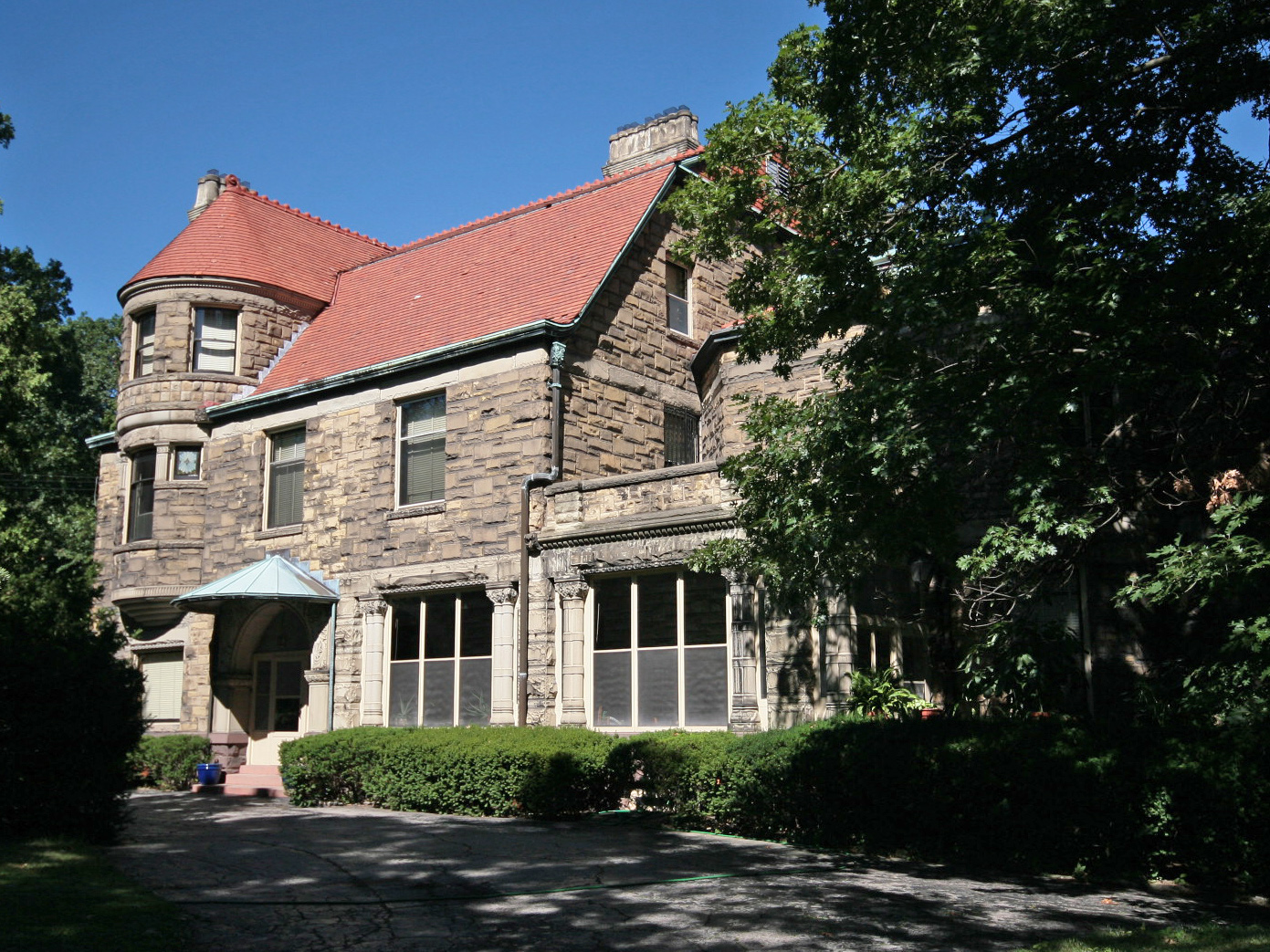

- Location within Ohio Location within the United States
- Location: 3540 Clifton Avenue, Cincinnati, Ohio
- Coordinates: 39°8′48.5″N 84°31′6″W
- Area: less than one acre
- Built: 1888
- Architect: James W. McLaughlin
- Architectural style: Richardsonian Romanesque
- NRHP reference No.: 73001459
- Added to NRHP: April 3, 1973

The Sir Alfred T. Goshorn House is a historic residence in the Clifton neighborhood of Cincinnati, Ohio, United States. Designed by a leading Cincinnati architect for an internationally prominent businessman, the stone house was named a historic site in the 1970s.

== Goshorn ==
Alfred T. Goshorn was a Cincinnati businessman who headed a firm producing white lead. A native of the city, he was a pioneer in the newly emerging game of baseball, becoming president of the country's first professional squad, the Cincinnati Red Stockings. However, his greatest significance was that of organizing a series of industrial exhibitions, beginning with an 1870 show in Cincinnati that continued into the 1880s. By the middle of the decade, he was sufficiently well regarded to be chosen as the director-general for the Centennial Exposition of 1876. For his handling of the exposition, nine different European nations granted him honors, including a British knighthood from Queen Victoria. Goshorn and his family moved into the present house in 1888, although the final details of construction were completed only in 1890. The architect was James W. McLaughlin, one of the city's premier architects of the period.

== Architecture ==
Goshorn's house is a stone building with a tile roof and additional elements of metal. Three stories tall, the house has an irregular plan: a gambrel roof covers the center of the building, while the rear parlor was originally one story tall with a flatter roof, and the other end possesses a turret-shaped oriel and an enclosed porch. The second story of the rear section is a McLaughlin-designed art gallery added in 1899, a significant modification that required a complete reconstruction of the parlor's lighting: skylights had originally supplied all light, similar to those of a room at a nearby house, Scarlet Oaks, and the octagonal addition with its new spiral stair required additional lighting. The style is Richardsonian Romanesque, similar to another McLaughlin house nearby, the John Uri Lloyd House; both buildings include radical new components, such as disjointed sections without the smooth transitions favored both by style namesake Henry Hobson Richardson and by McLaughlin's local contemporary Samuel Hannaford.

== Historic site ==
In 1973, the Goshorn House was listed on the National Register of Historic Places, qualifying because of its historically significant architecture. It is one of numerous such sites on Clifton Avenue; several city blocks were designated the Clifton Avenue Historic District in 1978, and both the Clifton Methodist Episcopal Church and the Probasco Fountain are located within a quarter mile to the south and north, respectively.
