= Cincinnati and Hamilton County Public Library =

Public library in Cincinnati, Ohio, US

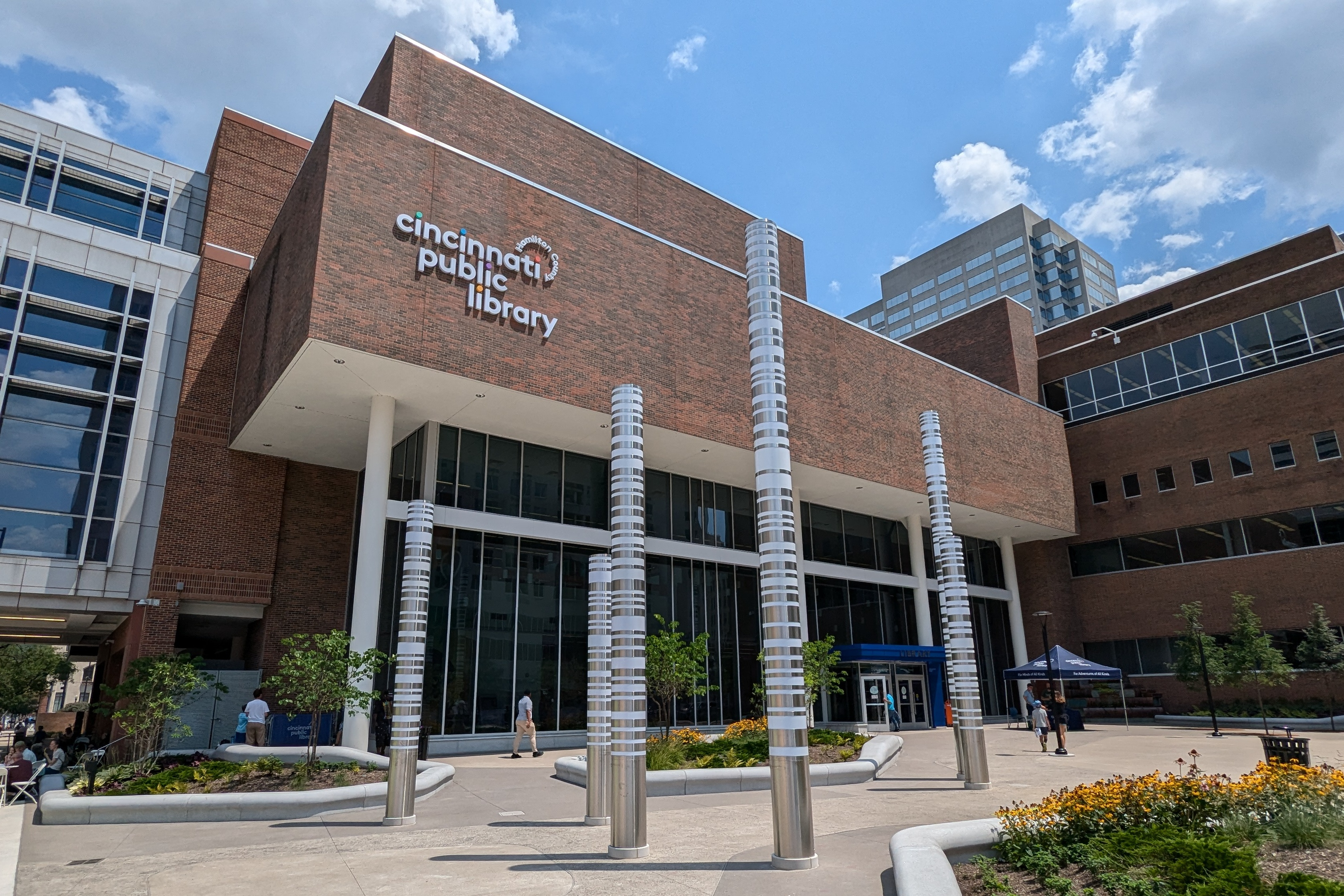
- The downtown main library in July 2024
- 39°6′18″N 84°30′48″W
- Location: Cincinnati and Hamilton County, Ohio, United States
- Established: March 14, 1853; 173 years ago
- Branches: 41

Collection
- Size: 9.6 million (2022)
- Legal deposit: Selective federal depository library

Access and use
- Circulation: 17,405,202 (2021)
- Population served: 845,303
- Members: 489,258 active

Other information
- Budget: US$80.5 million
- Director: Paula Brehm-Heeger
- Website: http://www.chpl.org

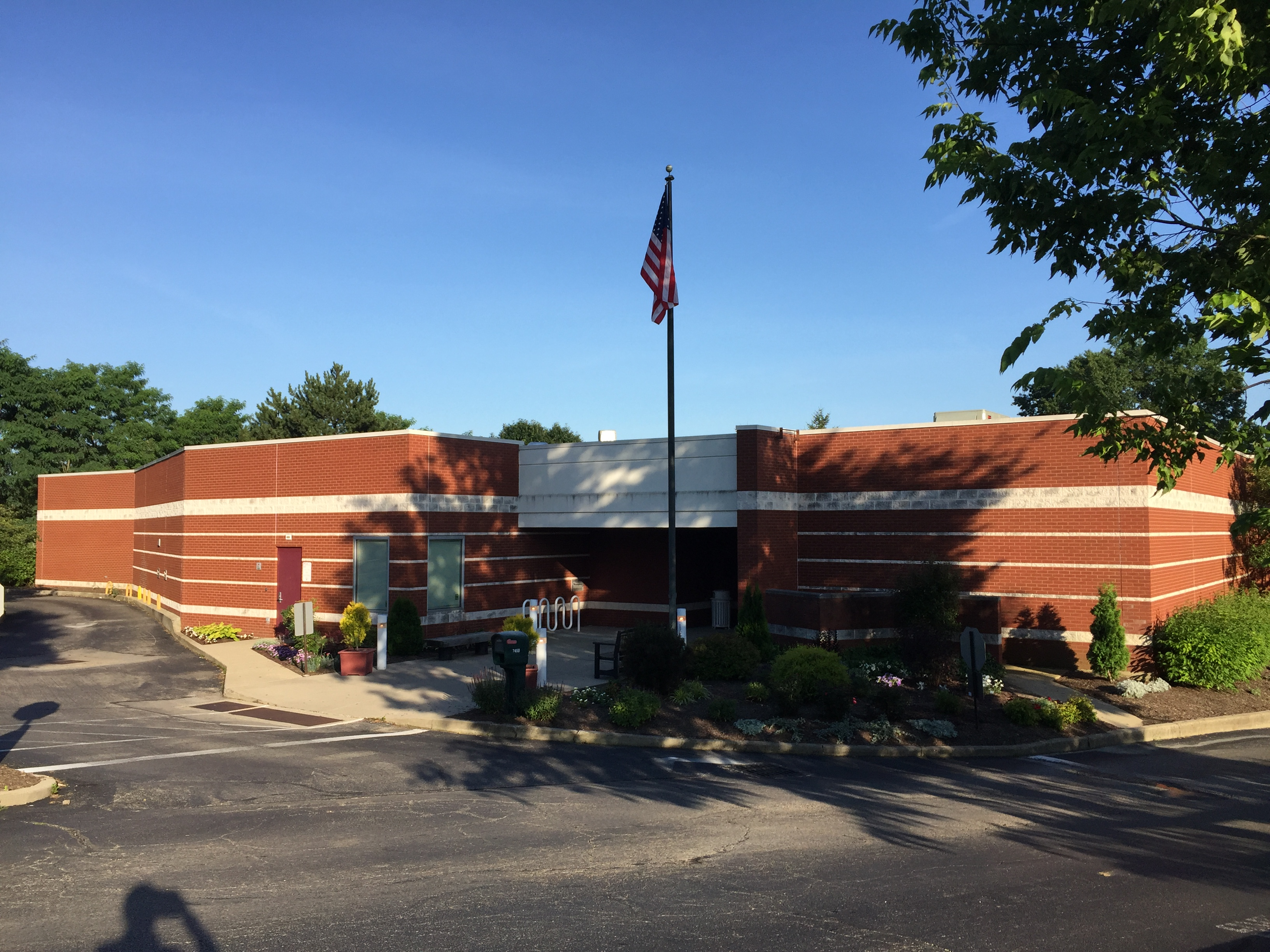
Anderson Branch

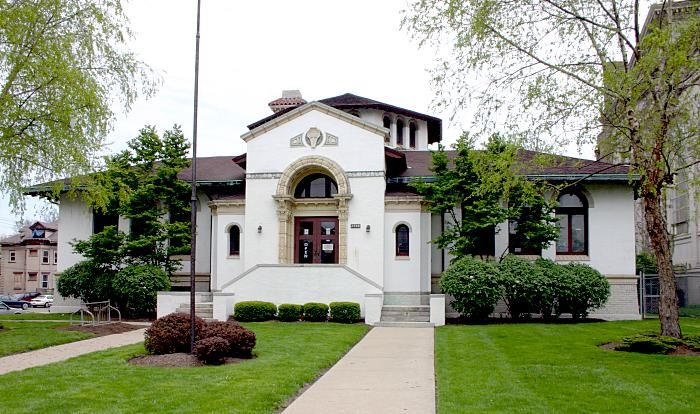
Avondale Branch

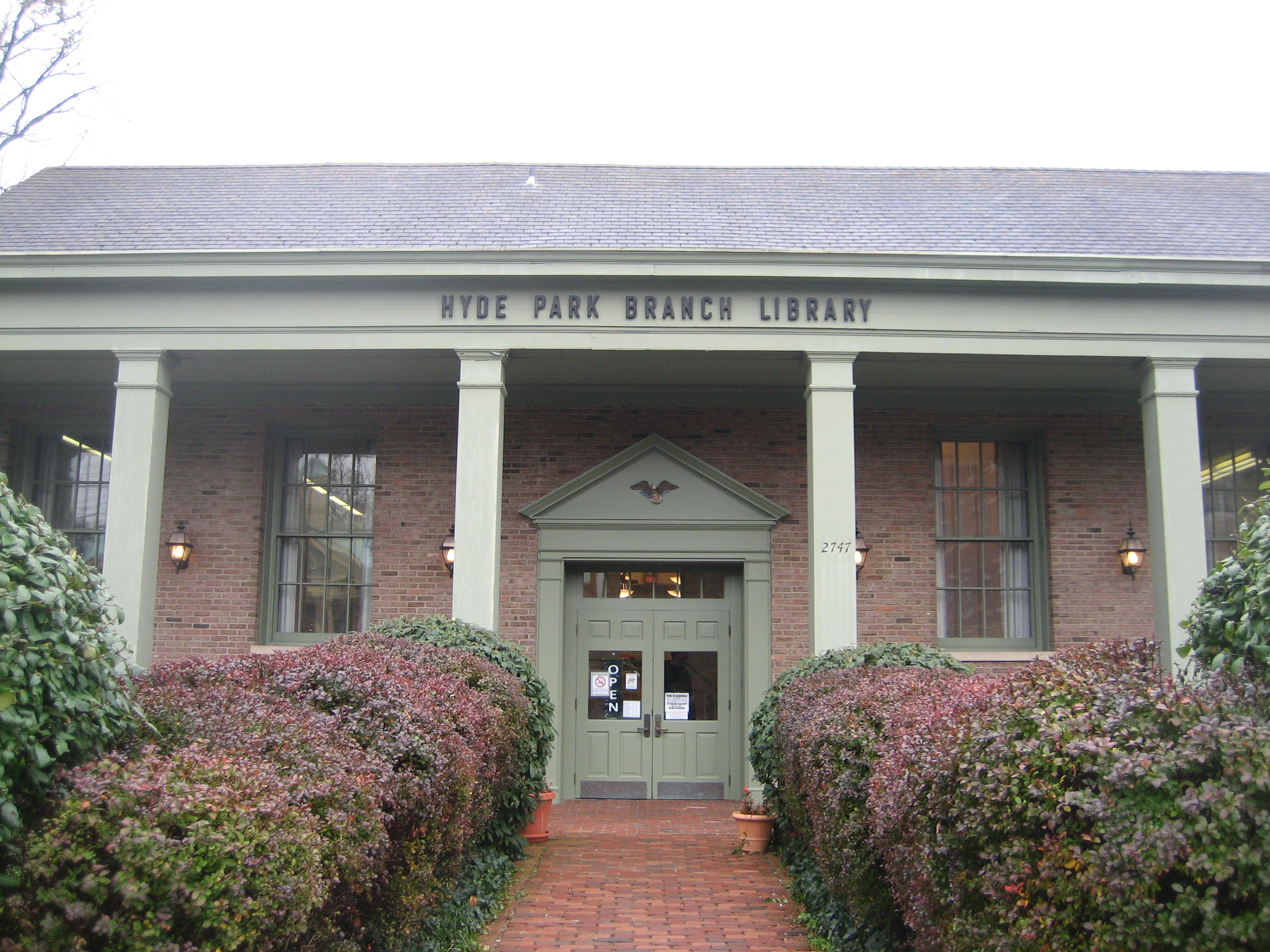
Hyde Park Branch

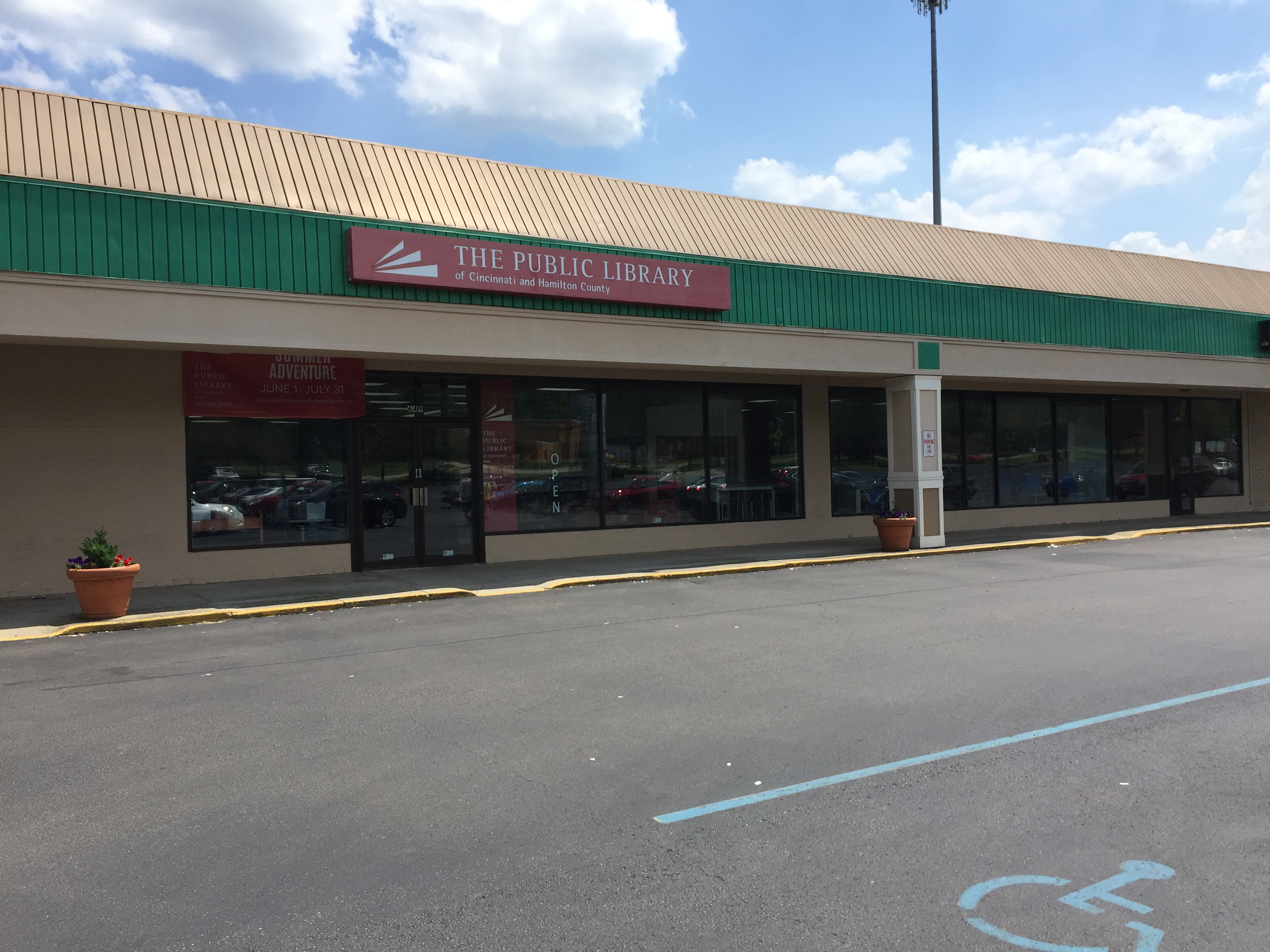
Loveland Branch

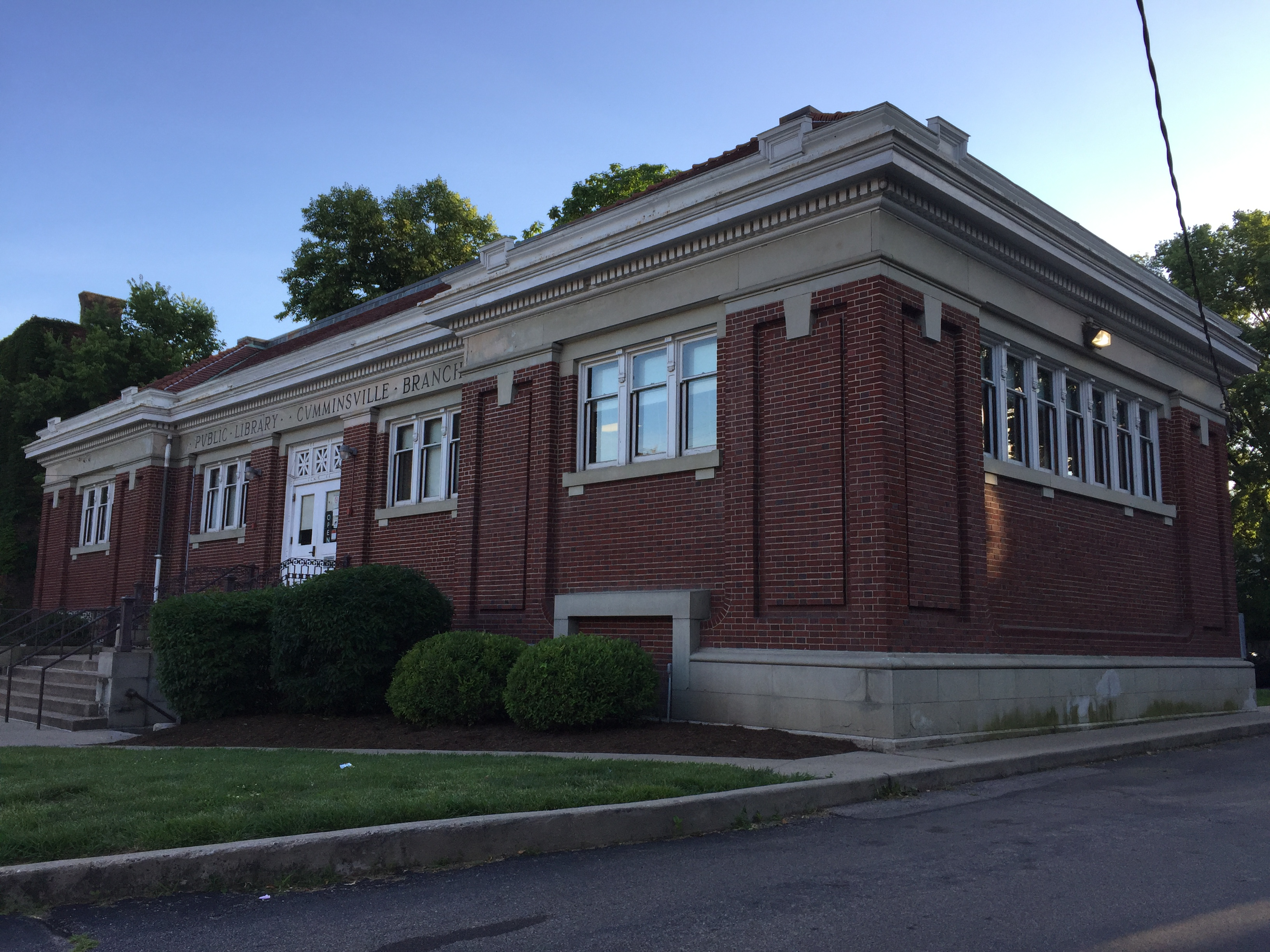
Northside Branch

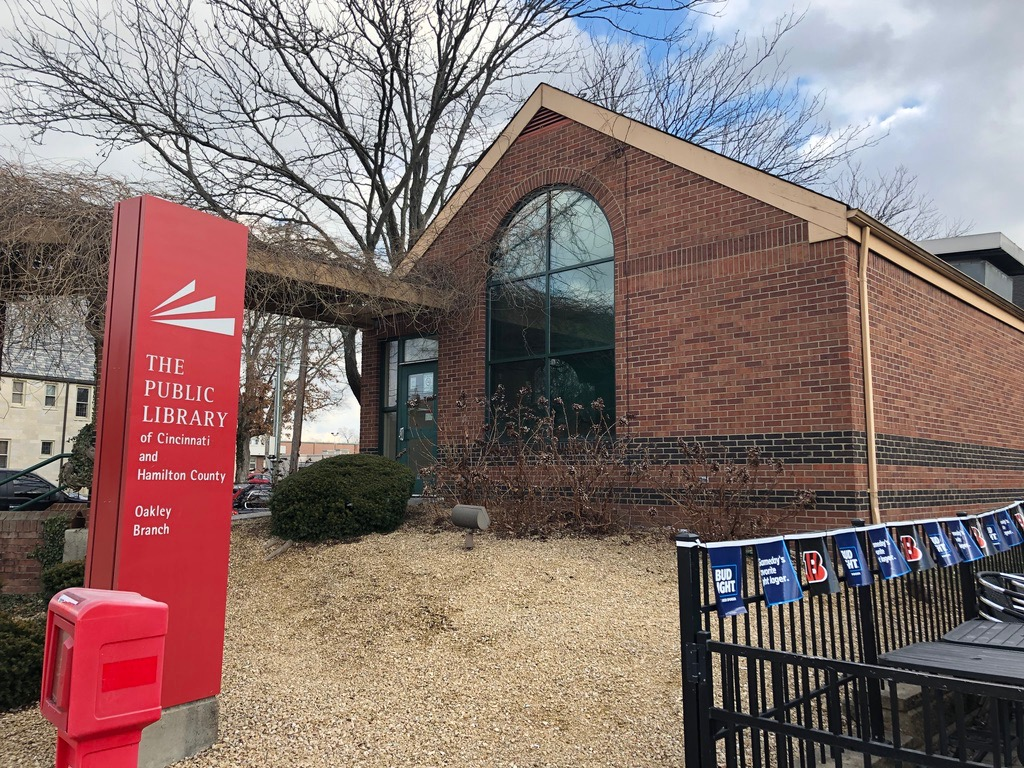
Oakley Branch

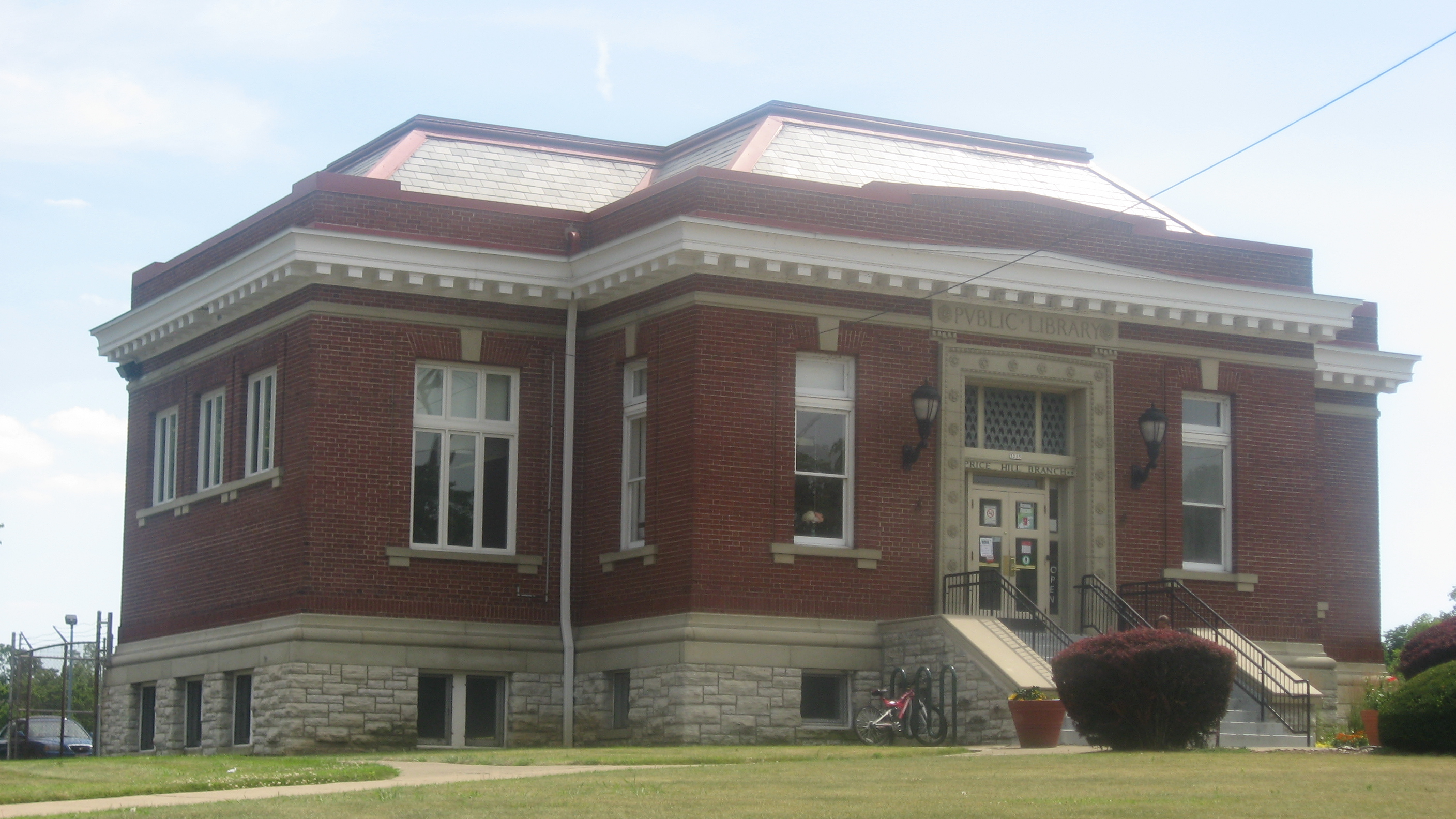
Price Hill Branch

Cincinnati and Hamilton County Public Library (CHPL) is a public library system in the United States. In addition to its main library location in downtown Cincinnati, Ohio, CHPL operates 40 regional and branch locations throughout Hamilton County.

As of 2021, CHPL's collection held around 9.6 million volumes, the 13th-largest overall library collection in the U.S., and the 2nd-largest public library collection in the U.S. Its electronic book holdings were nearly six million, the most of any public library in the country.

In 2019, CHPL had an annual circulation of over twenty-one million items, the second highest circulation of any public library in the country. The downtown location alone circulates over four million items annually, the most of any single library location in the country, and has an area of 542,527 square feet (50,402.4 m^{2}). CHPL's various locations had 5,154,502 visitors in 2019.

The library first received Library Journal's highest rating of five stars in 2013, and has received the honor every year since. In 2020, it scored second in the nation among libraries with expenditures over US$30 million.

== Services ==
Among CHPL's collections are books, audiobooks, downloadable digital audio and e-books, magazines, newspapers, CDs, videos, DVDs, CD-ROMs, sheet music, slides, microfilm, microfiche, and Braille. It offers free in-building computer access and Wi-Fi, as well as loaning Wi-Fi hotspots for use at home. The system collectively offered over 17,000 free programs in 2019, including classes, lectures, book clubs, performances, storytimes, and much more. In 2019, its staff answered 1.6 million reference questions by phone, online chat, fax, e-mail, post, and in person. The Main Branch is a selective federal depository library.

The library's website provides access to the library catalog, nearly 150 commercial research databases, bestseller lists, staff reading recommendations, and other information resources.

Special needs services provided by CHPL include "talking books" and Braille to the visually impaired, blind, and physically handicapped in 33 Ohio counties; its outreach services include books-by-mail, foreign language materials and bilingual programs, and passport application; its literacy services include GED classes and GED practice testing.

CHPL holds one of the largest genealogical collections in the United States. Online postings include Cincinnati and Norwood, Ohio city directories, Sanborn maps, and yearbooks as well as books relating to local history.

In 2015, the library opened its first MakerSpace at the Main Library downtown, offering button makers, 3D printers, sewing machines, laser engraving, photography equipment, a recording booth, and more. Later that year, branch MakerSpaces also opened at the Reading and St. Bernard locations, and renovations at the Loveland branch in 2016 included opening a fourth MakerSpace.

=== Special collections ===
In addition to its large book collection, the library also has many specialized collections, most of which are housed in the main library. Highlights of special book collections include:

- Adult New Reader/English as a Second Language Collections
- Braille Books
- Contemporary Artists’ Books
- Jean Alva Goldsmith Children's Literature Collection
- Jobs Information Center Collection
- Science Fair Project Collection
- Murray Seasongood Collection of Government, Law and Public Administration
- Online Exhibit of photos of the 1937 Ohio river flood.
- Theological and Religious Collection

== History ==
CHPL traces its roots to a subscription library that began in 1802. On March 14, 1853, it became the Cincinnati Public Library. Since its founding, the library has occupied several locations, including its current location at Eighth Street and Vine Street.

The library collection was originally housed in the Central School on the now defunct Longworth Street. In 1856, the library was moved to the second floor of the Ohio Mechanics' Institute. However, it outgrew that location, so in 1868 library officials purchased a four-story building under construction on 629 Vine Street that was going to be an opera house until that project went bankrupt. J.W. McLaughlin was hired to complete the design of the structure as a library. The front part of the "Old Main" Library opened on December 9, 1870; the main hall, connected to the front section via a large vestibule, opened on February 25, 1874. The main hall featured checkered marble flooring, cast iron book alcoves, skylights and spiral staircases stretching four stories high. At the entrance to the library were stone heads of William Shakespeare, John Milton and Benjamin Franklin. Built at a cost of $383,594.53, about $7.7 million in 2014, the facility was considered modern at its time, with central heating, an elevator, and a capacity of about 300,000 books. In 1906, this became the Main Library when branches were added. Despite the building's size, by the 1920s the rapidly-increasing collection was outgrowing the building, with books now being stacked in hard-to-reach areas. The paint was peeling, ventilation and light were poor, volumes stored in the basement and subcellar were prone to ruin from flooding, and the building itself was considered a fire hazard. But numerous legal and financial issues as well as squabbles over a new site delayed construction of a new structure at Eighth and Vine. The contemporary building opened on January 31, 1955. The old building was sold to Leyman Corp that month for $100,000 today and was completely demolished by that summer. Today the former Macy's building and a parking garage occupy the site. The three busts that once guarded the main entrance of the old library were saved and placed in the new library's garden. Many other structural elements and contents from the old building, including doors, shelving, furniture, and bricks were also salvaged and sold.

Logo used from the 1990s until 2020

Cincinnati's public library was among the first to try providing service to patrons on Sunday. Starting in March 1871, the reading rooms at the main library were open from 8am to 10pm. Sunday library service was so popular that, according to library director William F. Poole, "often during the afternoon and evenings every seat has been occupied". As a result of Cincinnati's experiment, the public libraries in New York, Philadelphia, and St. Louis adopted Sunday hours as well. Poole reported that "many of that class of young men who [had previously] strolled about the streets on Sunday, and spent the day in a less profitable manner, [began] habitually frequenting the rooms and spending a portion of the day in reading."

Beginning in the early 1990s, the library used the Computerized Information Network for Cincinnati and Hamilton County (CINCH) as a system-wide library catalog which connected each branch through computer terminals. Users at home accessed the database via TELNET. In 2005, the system was replaced with an integrated library system (ILS) purchased from library automation vendor Sirsi, now SirsiDynix. In 2012, the ILS was again replaced with Sierra, a product from Innovative Interfaces.

Beginning in 2001, budget cuts from the State of Ohio drastically reduced funding for PLCH. In July 2002, the board of trustees voted to close branch locations in Deer Park, Elmwood Place, Greenhills and Mount Healthy. The board later backed off on the branch closing plan after a strong negative response from citizens in the affected neighborhoods.

In 2005, the library received the American Library Association's John Cotton Dana Public Relations Award.

In 2005, a state budget plan that cut spending on libraries a further five percent was passed in the Ohio House of Representatives, after being proposed by Ohio governor Bob Taft. The budget prompted the library to distribute flyers and hold rallies in Downtown Cincinnati, calling on the state to repeal the proposed cuts. The cuts resulted in a periodic hiring freeze, reductions in hours, branch and department closings, and the layoff of approximately forty librarians. Librarians responded by voting to join the Service Employees International Union (SEIU) Local 1199 in 2006.

After nine months of contentious negotiations over a union contract, the parties (SEIU and the library administration) resorted to a hearing in front of a third-party neutral negotiator, who drew up a labor contract. Librarians voted 45–1 to approve the contract. The library's board of trustees subsequently voted the contract down by a 7–0 vote, citing concerns over 'fair share' proposals built into the contract. After further negotiations between SEIU and attorneys for the library, the board approved a union contract that did not include fair share. See the Agency shop article for clarification.

In 2007, the library began implementing a reorganization plan, known as ML/21 (Main Library for the 21st Century), to plan the creation of a Technology Center, Teen Center, a Popular Library, and a Local History and Genealogy Department. The plan also called for the disbanding of subject departments in Art and Music, Literature and Languages, History and Genealogy, Rare Books and Special Collections, Science and Technology, Government and Business, Education and Religion, Fiction and Young Adults, and Films and Recordings. The latter two departments were planned to be incorporated into a new Popular Library. The History and Genealogy Department were planned to be merged with Rare Books and Special Collections to create the Local History and Genealogy department. The other subject departments were planned to be merged into the Information and Reference department. Approximately 24 professional positions (those holding a Master of Library and Information Science) were slated for elimination through attrition and reassignment.

From July 2007 to mid 2008, the library joined with Kirtas Technologies, Inc. to digitize rare books and make them available via Amazon.com. The library no longer participates in the program, but profits from sales of the digitized books were shared with the library. Other institutions involved in the plan included the University of Maine, Emory University in Atlanta, and the Toronto Public Library in Ontario. Digitized material, including books, maps, yearbooks, and city directories, are available via Cincinnati and Hamilton County Public Library's Virtual Library.

In 2019, the library launched a multi-year improvement project called "Building the Next Generation Library." The project planned for facility improvements across the system depending on the needs of communities and facilities. Listening sessions were held for community members at each branch throughout 2019, and the Facility Master Plan documents outlined the recommended work to be done over the next 10 years. Part of the Next Generation Library initiative included a website and brand update in 2020, with the library moving to a BiblioCommons-based website and revealing new logos, brand colors, and the rearranged organization name from The Public Library of Cincinnati and Hamilton County (PLCH) to Cincinnati and Hamilton County Public Library (CHPL). Some priorities were modified due to the 2020 COVID-19 pandemic.

The library received the photographic archive of the Cincinnati Enquirer, covering the years 1945 to 1995, in 2023.

=== Directors ===
Fifteen individuals have served as directors of Cincinnati and Hamilton County Public Library:

- John D. Caldwell (1855–1857)
- N. Peabody Poor (1857–1866)
- Lewis Freeman (1866–1869)
- William Frederick Poole (1869–1873)
- Thomas Vickers (1874–1879)
- Chester W. Merrill (1880–1886)
- Albert W. Whelpley (1886–1900)
- Nathaniel D.C. Hodges (1900–1924)
- Chalmers Hadley (1924–1945)
- Carl Vitz (1946–1955)
- Ernest I. Miller (1955–1971)
- James R. Hunt (1971–1991)
- Robert D. Stonestreet (1991–1998)
- Kimber L. Fender (1999–2018)
- Paula Brehm-Heeger (2018–present)

== List of branches ==
CHPL has 40 branch locations, in addition to the main library downtown:

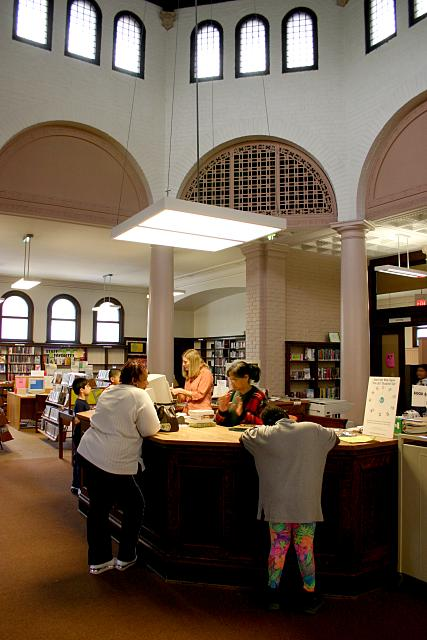
Interior of the Avondale Branch

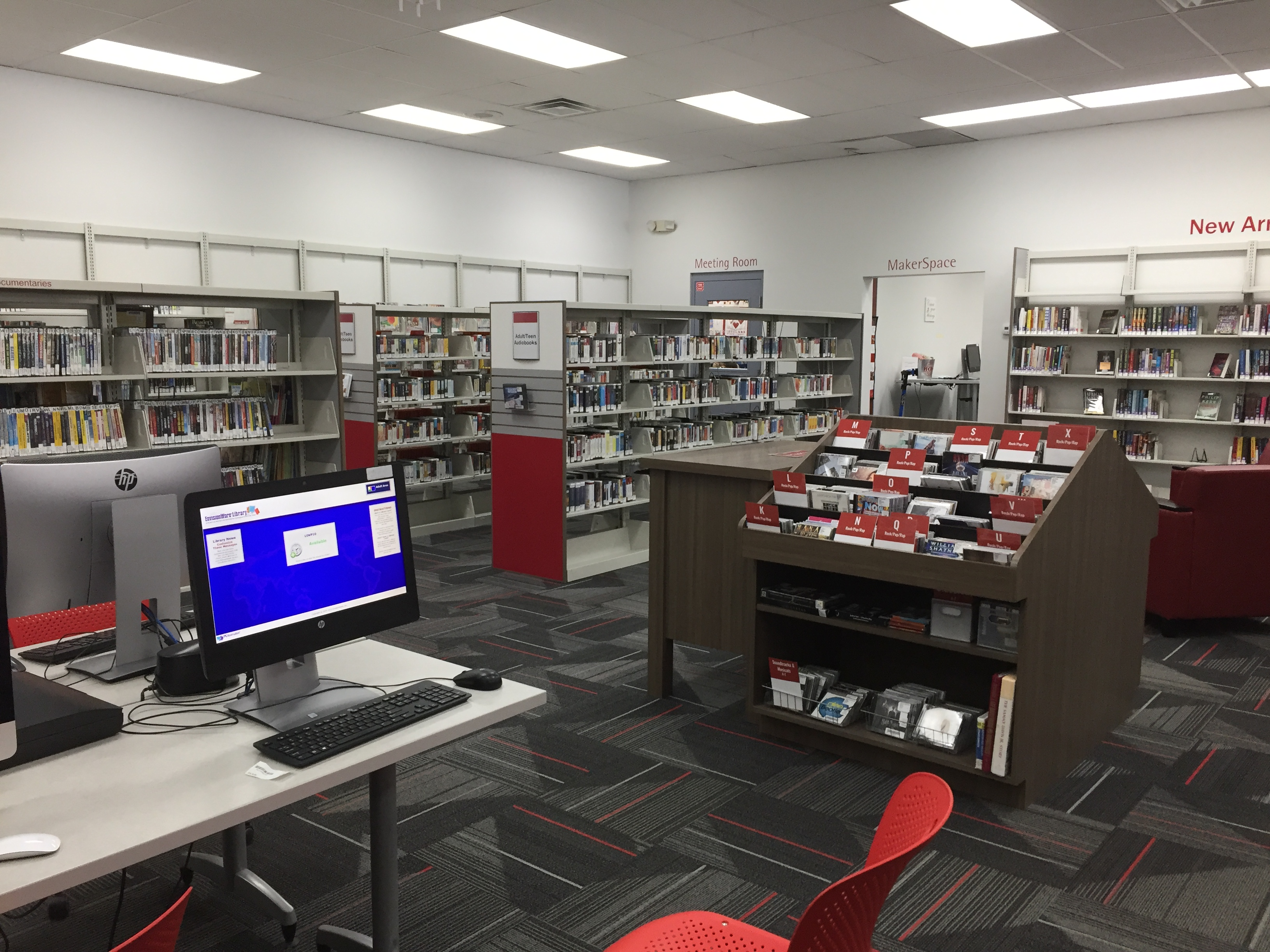
Interior of the Loveland Branch

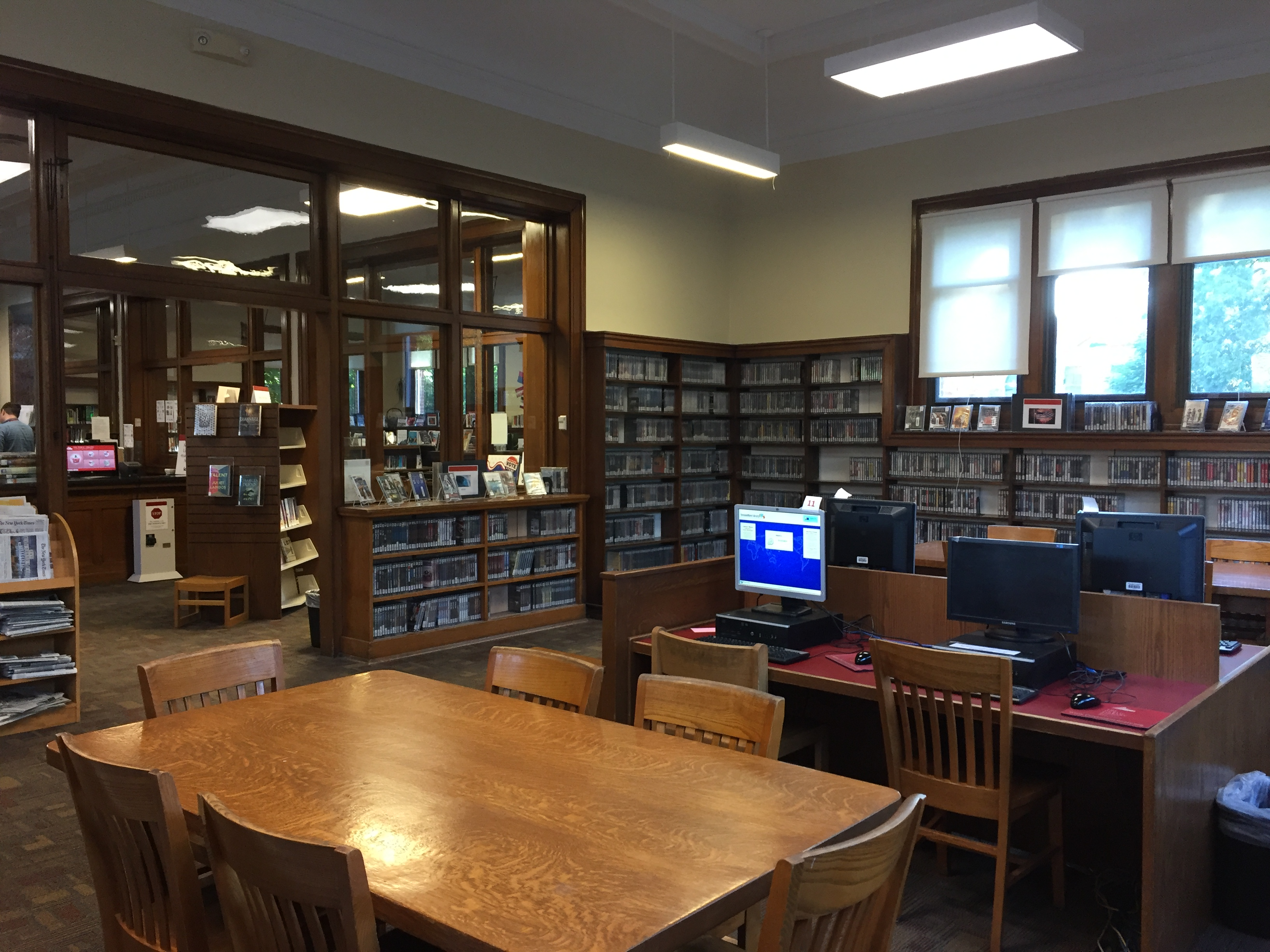
Interior of the Northside Branch

- Anderson Branch
- Avondale Branch*
- Blue Ash Branch (formerly the Sycamore Branch)
- Bond Hill Branch
- Cheviot Branch
- Clifton Branch
- College Hill Branch (formerly the Northern Hills Branch)
- Corryville Branch* (formerly the North Cincinnati Branch)
- Covedale Branch
- Deer Park Branch
- Delhi Township Branch
- Elmwood Place Branch
- Forest Park Branch (formerly the Parkdale Branch)
- Green Township Regional Branch
- Greenhills Branch
- Groesbeck Branch
- Harrison Branch
- Hyde Park Branch*
- Loveland Branch
- Madeira Branch (formerly the Madeira–Indian Hill Regional Branch)
- Madisonville Branch
- Mariemont Branch
- Miami Township Branch (originally the Cleves Branch)
- Monfort Heights Branch (formerly the West Fork Branch)
- Mt. Healthy Branch
- Mt. Washington Branch
- North Central Branch
- Northside Branch* (formerly the Cumminsville Branch)
- Norwood Branch*
- Oakley Branch
- Pleasant Ridge Branch
- Price Hill Branch*
- Reading Branch (formerly the Valley Branch)
- St. Bernard Branch
- Sharonville Branch
- Symmes Township Regional Branch
- Walnut Hills Branch*
- West End Branch (formerly the Lincoln Park Branch)
- Westwood Branch
- Wyoming Branch (formerly the Bonham Branch)

Locations marked with asterisks were built as Carnegie libraries.

== See also ==
- John Reily, one of the original subscribers
- The Public, a 2018 film set in the library's Main branch
