= James W. McLaughlin =

American architect (1834–1923)

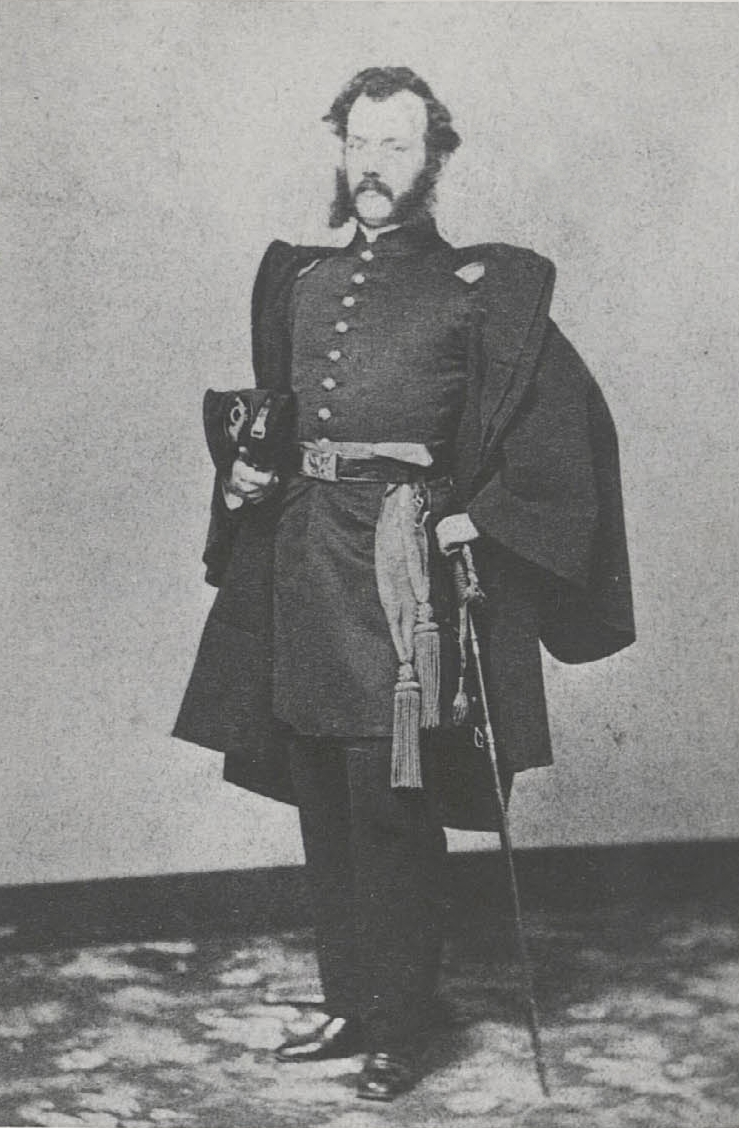
- First Lieutenant James W. McLaughlin
- Born: November 1, 1834; Sewickley, Pennsylvania, US
- Died: 1923 (aged 88–89)
- Occupation: Architect
- Buildings: John Uri Lloyd House; Sir Alfred T. Goshorn House; Cincinnati Zoological Gardens; Cincinnati Public Library; Mabley & Carew

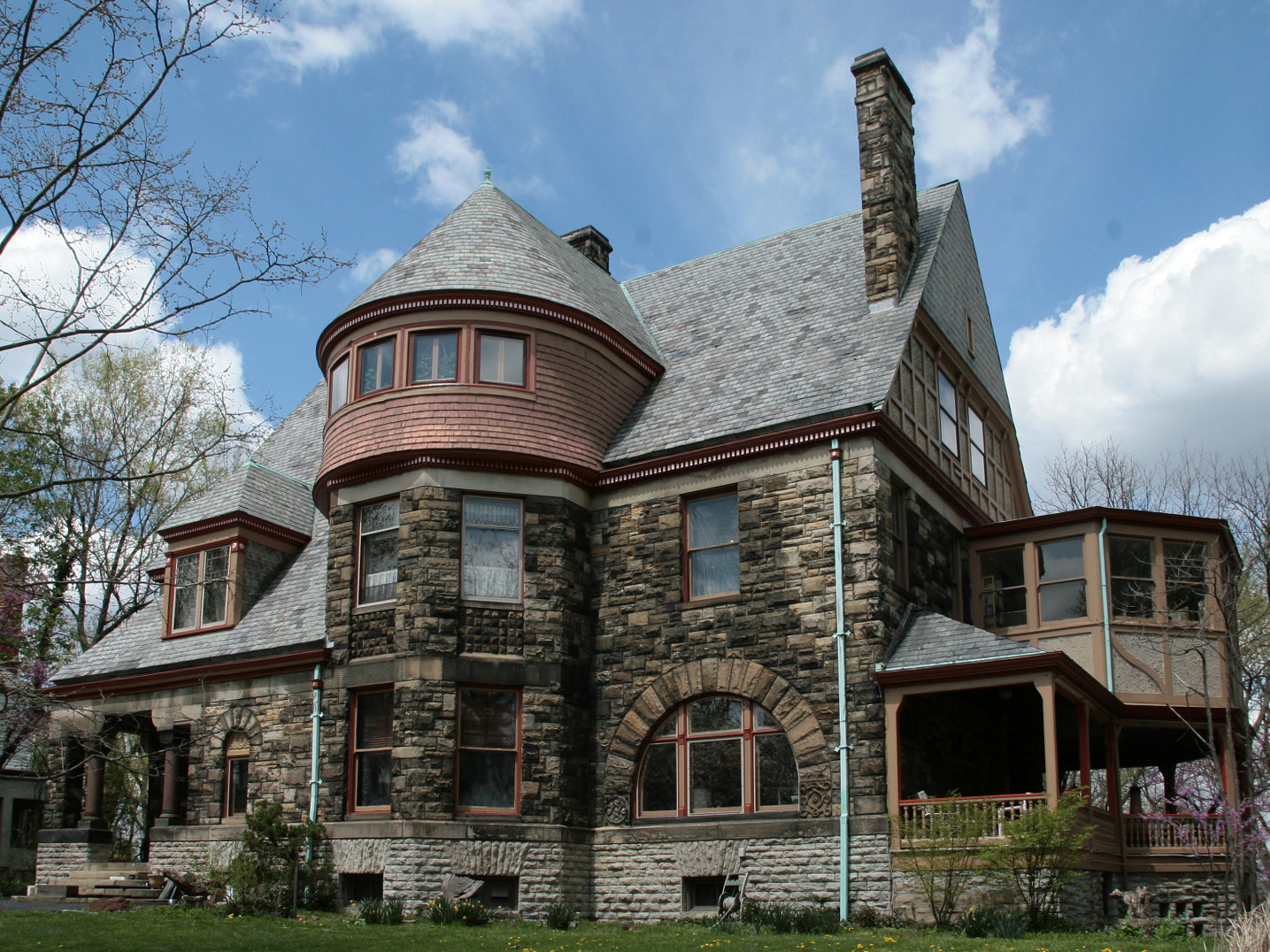
John Uri Lloyd House

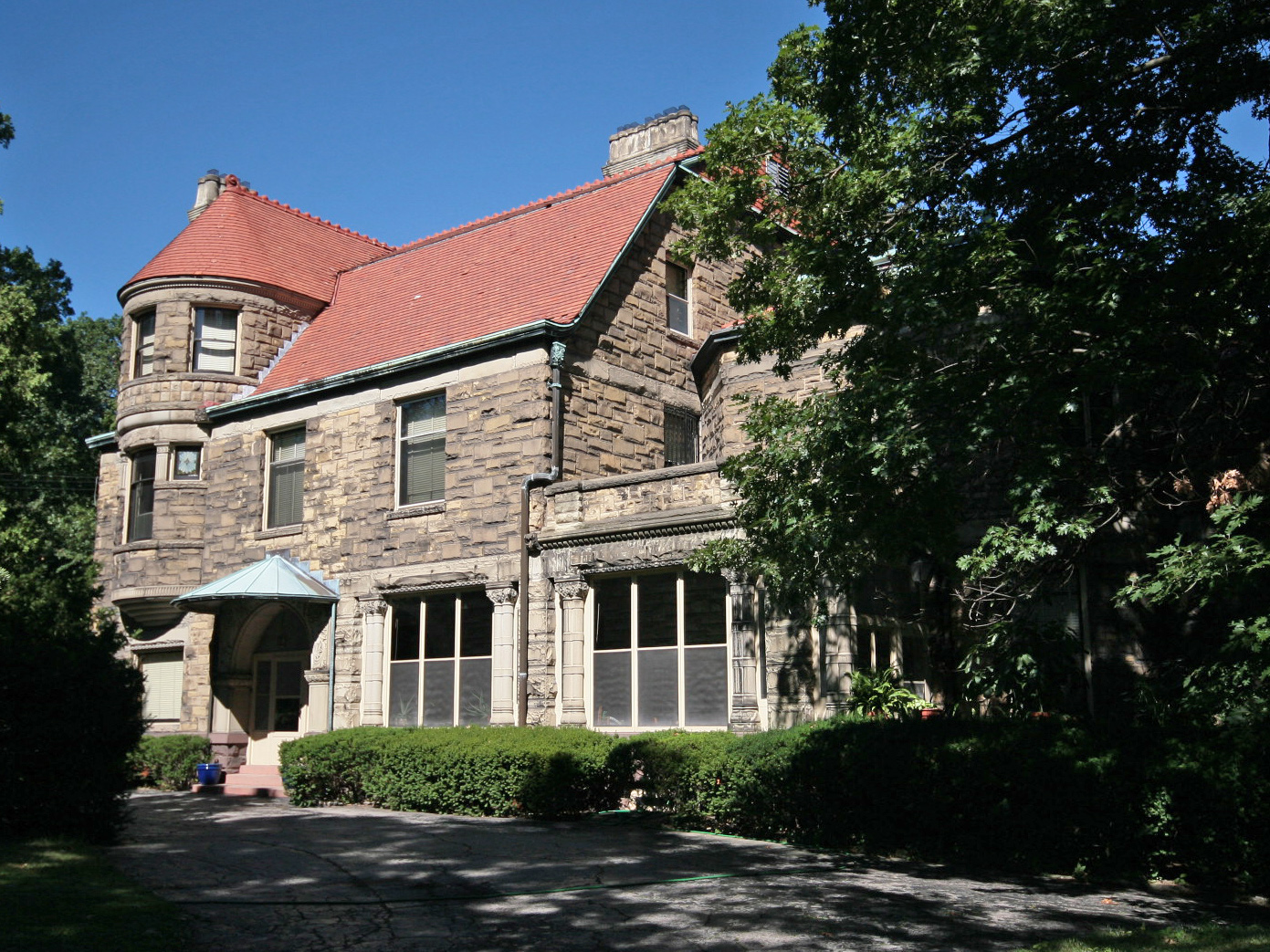
Sir Alfred T. Goshorn House

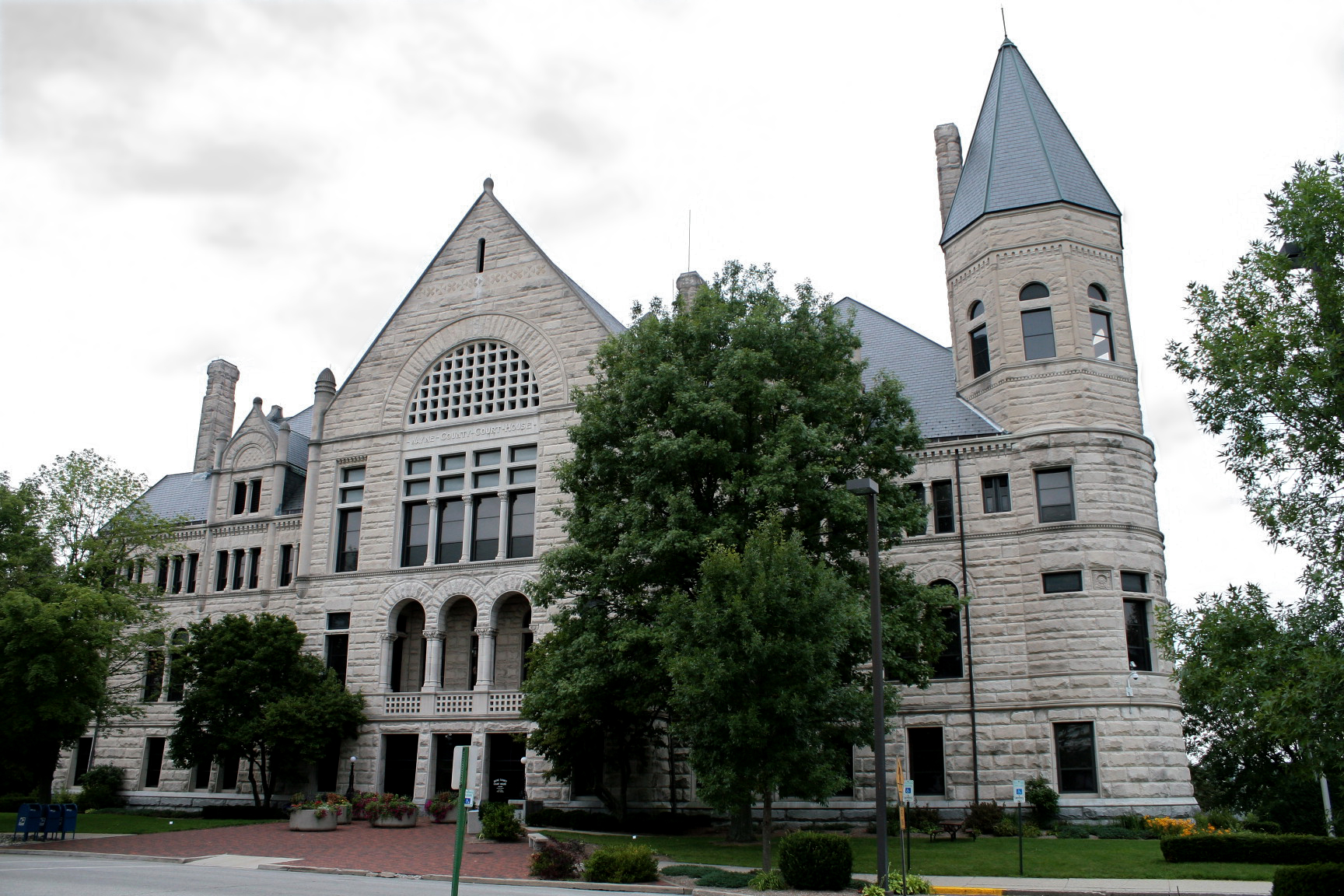
Wayne County Courthouse in Richmond, Indiana

James W. McLaughlin (November 1, 1834 – March 4, 1923) was a Cincinnati, Ohio architect. He studied to be an architect working under the famed James Keys Wilson. He fought in the American Civil War, serving in the Union Army. During the late 19th century, he became a popular builder in Cincinnati. In 1870, he helped organize the Cincinnati chapter of the American Institute of Architects; that year, he was selected as a Fellow of the AIA, serving on its board.

== Early life ==
James W. McLaughlin was born on November 1, 1834, the second son of William and Mary McLaughlin. His family was "largely" Scots-Irish and his father William was an early Cincinnati merchant who had moved in 1818 to the developing city from Sewickley, Pennsylvania outside Pittsburgh. His younger sister Mary Louise McLaughlin became a ceramic artist.

When the American Civil War broke out, McLaughlin left his architectural practice to serve in the Union Army. During the war, he became a lieutenant in the infantry body guard of General John C. Frémont. He also was a Special Artist for Frank Leslie’s Illustrated Newspaper.

After the war, he published "a book illustrated with his vivid vignettes of army life based on his experiences with General Fremont in California."

== Architectural career ==
At the age of 15, McLaughlin entered the tutelage of James Keys Wilson. In 1855, the first year of his independent practice, he built the dry goods store on West Fourth Street. Architect Samuel Hannaford was his rival in the city. McLaughlin's design for the Cincinnati Zoological Gardens (1874–1875) "produced the earliest completed structures specifically for that purpose in the United States, and displayed his sense of humor and flexibility in housing specimens in buildings inspired by their geographical and ethnically associated origins."

== Affiliations ==
McLaughlin helped organize the Cincinnati Chapter of the American Institute of Architects in 1870. He served as the group's president from 1878–1882 and 1889–1893. He was made a Fellow of the American Institute of Architects in 1870, served on its board, and "was active in their national meetings, including that held in Cincinnati in 1889, when the AIA and the Western Society of Architects merged."

== Projects ==
- St. Francis Seraph Church (1859) at 1600 Vine Street in Cincinnati
- Old Main Library (1868–1870)
- Motch Jewelers (ca. 1871) building at 613 Madison Avenue in Covington, KY
- Cincinnati Zoo Historic Structures at 3400 Vine Street in Cincinnati, Ohio (a National Historic Landmark
- Stores for John Shillito Company dry goods business, including its headquarters store (1878), a luxury 10-floor building that was considered a retail palace. This was renovated and adapted for residences in what is called The Lofts at Shillito Place .
- Cincinnati Gas, Coke & Light Co. building, an Italianate structure that stands at 305 West Fourth Street and Plum Street (it was converted into an apartment building).
- Hamilton County Courthouse, Ohio (1884 rebuilding), a reconstruction "after a riot and fire" destroyed 30 years later
- original Cincinnati Art Museum building (1882–1886), "the oldest extant museum building in the Midwest" that has "been almost entirely swallowed up in later additions, but his interiors have recently been restored to approximately their original form and once again demonstrate their structural, functional, and systemic validity."
- Bishop's Place in Clifton (1885)
- Art Academy of Cincinnati building (1885–1888)
- Sol P. Kineon-John Uri Lloyd house (1887) Clifton Avenue
- Machinery Hall for the 1888 Cincinnati Centennial Exposition "straddled" the Miami and Erie Canal
- Wayne County Courthouse, Richmond, Indiana (1889–1890) between 3rd, 4th, Main and South A Streets in Richmond Indiana. Listed on the National Register of Historic Places (NRHP)
- First Unitarian Church, Cincinnati (1888–1889) at Reading Road and Linton Street, 2901 Reading Road Cincinnati, Ohio, credited to James C. McLaughlin
- Sir Alfred T. Goshorn house (1890–1891) Clifton Avenue. Includes a staircase salvaged from the library of a house designed by Frank Furness
- Y.M.C.A. Building, Cincinnati (1890–1891) "later adapted as the Shubert Theater"
- Ohio State Building at the 1893 World's Columbian Exposition in Chicago. McLaughlin was chief architect for the project.
- Sir Alfred T. Goshorn House at 3540 Clifton Avenue in Cincinnati, Ohio
- Grace Church Cincinnati at 3626 Reading Road. Credited to McLaughlin and Albert C. Nash, and listed on the NRHP.
- John Uri Lloyd House 3901 Clifton Avenue in Cincinnati. Listed on the NRHP.
- Mabley & Carew Building (1907) 12 floors (destroyed)
- Mabley & Carew Department Store, 6 floors, 1881 (destroyed)
- McAlpin building (1873), on Fourth Street, a 6-floor building adjacent to an earlier building designed by James Keys Wilson. Now part of a condo development.

== See also ==
- Cincinnati Zoo Historic Structures
