= Wayne County Courthouse (Indiana) =

- U.S. National Register of Historic Places
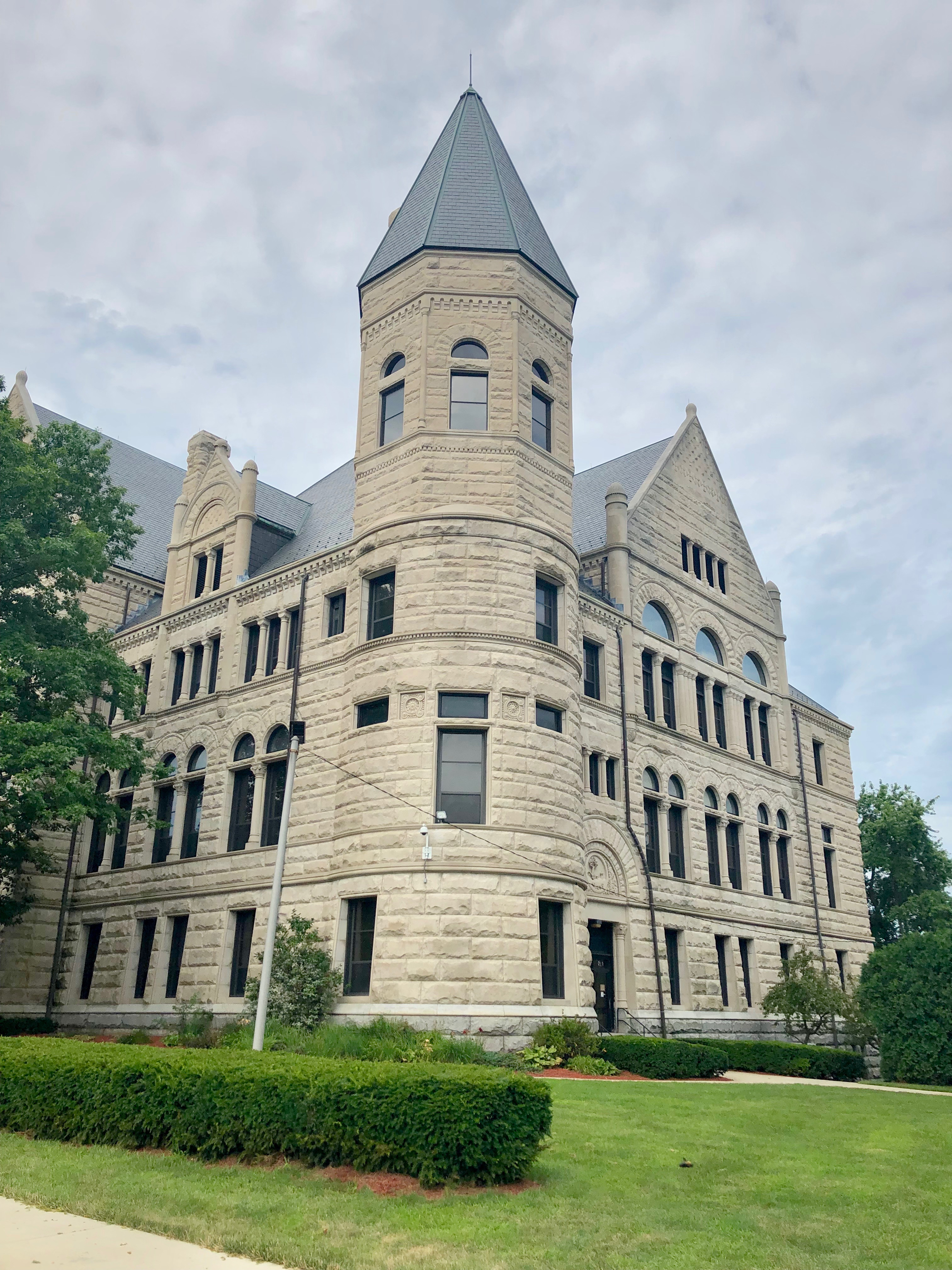

- Location within Indiana Location within the United States
- Interactive map showing the location of Wayne County Courthouse
- Nearest city: Richmond, Indiana
- Coordinates: 39°49′42″N 84°53′50″W
- Area: 2 acres (0.81 ha)
- Built: 1893
- Architect: James W. McLaughlin
- Architectural style: Richardsonian Romanesque
- NRHP reference No.: 78000042
- Added to NRHP: December 8, 1978

The Wayne County Courthouse is a historic courthouse located in Richmond, Indiana. It was built during the period 1890–93, and is in the Richardsonian Romanesque style. The building was designed by Cincinnati, Ohio, architect James W. McLaughlin and the construction was supervised by New Castle, Indiana, architect William S. Kaufman. The U-shaped building measures approximately 214 feet by 128 feet, and is constructed of brick faced with Indiana Limestone. It features a projecting entrance pavilion, high pitched hipped and gable roofs, large semicircular arches, and octagonal corner tower. Architectural historians Michael Tomlan and Mary Raddant-Tomlan have suggested that the Wayne County Courthouse was influenced both in terms of exterior design and elements of interior layout by Henry Hobson Richardson's Allegheny County Courthouse in Pittsburgh, Pennsylvania.

It was listed on the National Register of Historic Places in 1978. It borders the northern boundary of the Old Richmond Historic District which includes some of Richmond's earliest extant architecture.

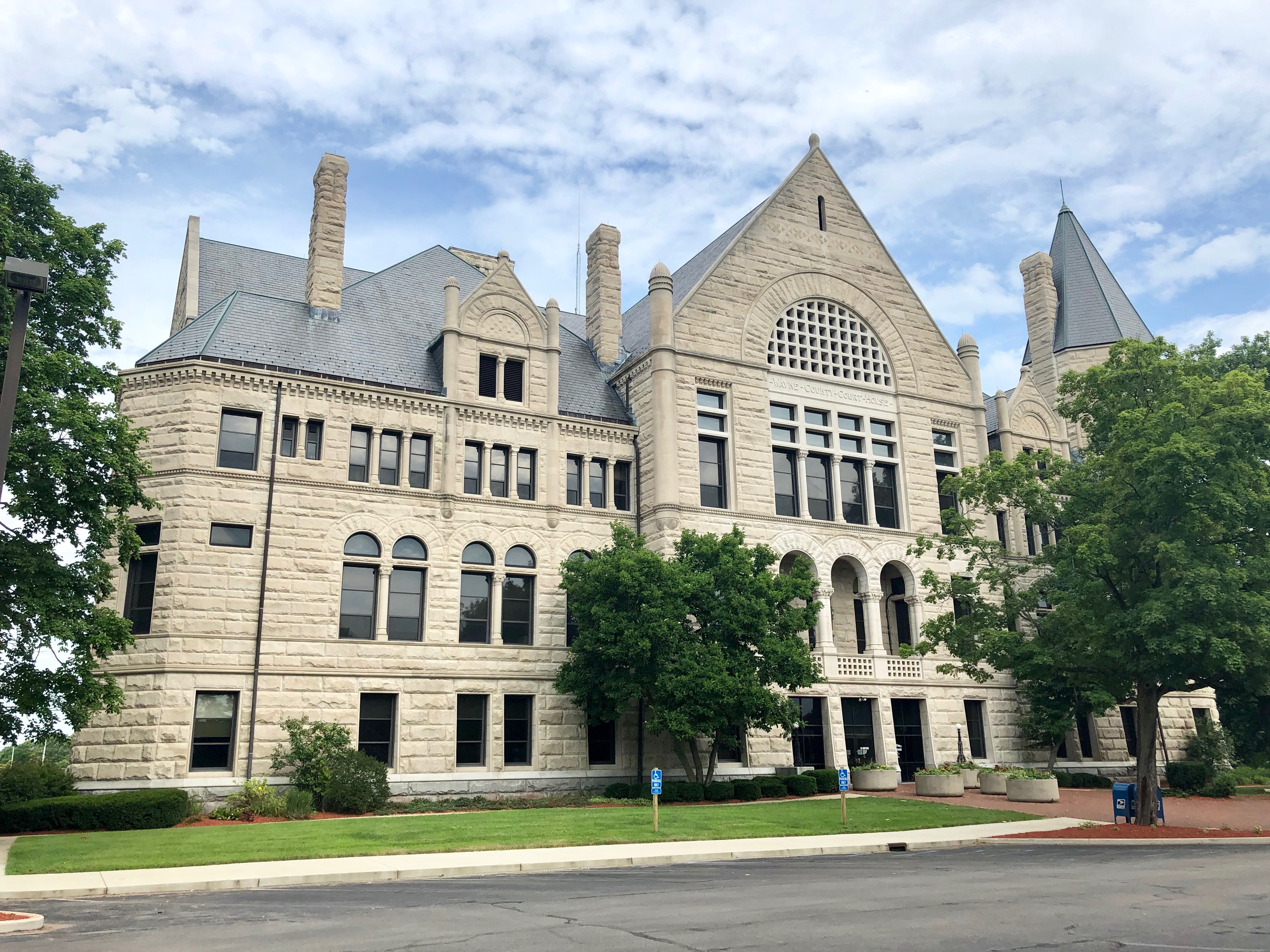
East Facade
