= John Uri Lloyd House =

Historic house in Ohio, United States

- U.S. National Register of Historic Places
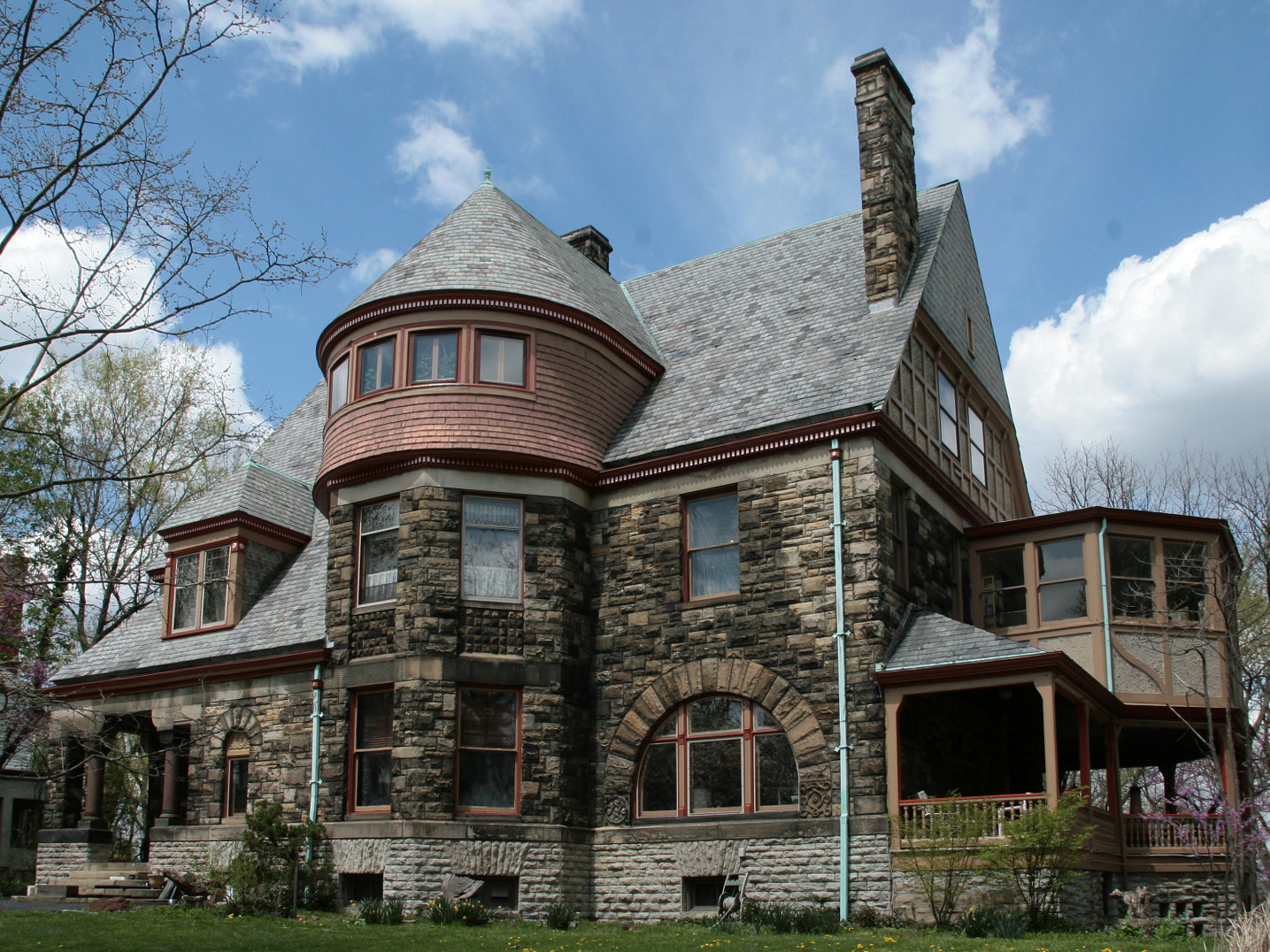
- Location: 3901 Clifton Avenue, Cincinnati, Ohio
- Coordinates: 39°9′24.20″N 84°31′3.93″W
- Architect: James W. McLaughlin
- Architectural style: Romanesque
- NRHP reference No.: 73001461
- Added to NRHP: March 7, 1973

John Uri Lloyd House is a registered historic building in Cincinnati, Ohio, listed in the National Register on March 7, 1973. Lloyd was an American pharmacist who was a leader in the eclectic medicine movement and influential in the development of pharmacognosy, ethnobotany, economic botany, and herbalism. In 1886, he and his two brothers, also chemists, established a pharmacology business together, named Lloyd Brothers, Pharmacists, Inc. It operated until after the senior Lloyd's death, when it was bought in 1938 by S.B. Penick.

From their earnings, in 1919 the brothers established a trust fund for the Lloyd Library and Museum, originally based on John Lloyd's personal collection related to medical botany, eclectic medicine and pharmacy. It is also located in Cincinnati.

Lloyd purchased the house in 1909 from Cincinnati coal magnate Solomon P. Kineon, who lived there from 1885 to 1908. It had been built for Kineon in 1879, designed by architect James W. McLaughlin. The Richardsonian Romanesque design features broken range Ashler masonry, a ten-windowed turret, and a Diocletian window.

After Lloyd's death, the house passed to Walter and Margie Preston in 1938. In 1957 the house was purchased by its next owners, John and Billye Bierhorst, and in the 1960s sold to their son-in-law, Monroe Sher and daughter, Ellen Bierhorst (Sher), who is responsible for the historic register listing and naming the house after John Uri Lloyd.

== Historic uses ==
The Lloyd House has had several uses. In addition to being used as a single dwelling by each of the owners, both Margie Preston and Ellen Bierhorst rented rooms in the house at different points in time. The house has more recently been used as a healing center featuring Dr. Bierhorst's private practice. In the early 1960s and late 1970s, the Lloyd House was also the headquarters of The Independent Eye, an underground newspaper.
