= National Register of Historic Places listings in Brooke County, West Virginia =

Location of Brooke County in West Virginia

This is a list of the National Register of Historic Places listings in Brooke County, West Virginia.

This is intended to be a comprehensive list of the properties and districts on the National Register of Historic Places in Brooke County, West Virginia, United States. The locations of National Register properties and districts for which the latitude and longitude coordinates are included below may be viewed on Google maps.

There are 24 properties and districts listed on the National Register in the county, 2 of which are National Historic Landmarks.

This National Park Service list is complete through NPS recent listings posted March 21, 2025.

Contents: Counties in West Virginia

Barbour - Berkeley - Boone - Braxton - Brooke - Cabell - Calhoun - Clay - Doddridge - Fayette - Gilmer - Grant - Greenbrier - Hampshire - Hancock - Hardy - Harrison - Jackson - Jefferson - Kanawha - Lewis - Lincoln - Logan - Marion - Marshall - Mason - McDowell - Mercer - Mineral - Mingo - Monongalia - Monroe - Morgan - Nicholas - Ohio - Pendleton - Pleasants - Pocahontas - Preston - Putnam - Raleigh - Randolph - Ritchie - Roane - Summers - Taylor - Tucker - Tyler - Upshur - Wayne - Webster - Wetzel - Wirt - Wood - Wyoming

== Current listings ==
	Name on the Register	Image	Date listed	Location	City or town	Description
1	Beallmore	Beallmore	May 16, 1986 (#86001069)	1500 Pleasant Ave. 40°16′42″N 80°36′24″W	Wellsburg	
2	Bethany Historic District	Bethany Historic District	April 1, 1982 (#82004311)	West Virginia Route 67; 40°12′22″N 80°33′16″W	Bethany	
3	Brooke Cemetery	Brooke Cemetery	May 16, 1986 (#86001070)	2200 Pleasant Ave. 40°17′15″N 80°36′17″W	Wellsburg	
4	Danforth Brown House	Danforth Brown House	October 29, 1992 (#92001484)	555 Washington Pike (West Virginia Route 27); 40°16′06″N 80°35′26″W	Wellsburg	
5	Alexander Campbell Mansion	Alexander Campbell Mansion	October 15, 1970 (#70000651)	East of Bethany on West Virginia Route 67; 40°12′27″N 80°32′51″W	Bethany	
6	Delta Tau Delta Founders House	Delta Tau Delta Founders House	May 29, 1979 (#79002571)	211 Main St. 40°12′19″N 80°33′27″W	Bethany	
7	Gen. I.H. Duval Mansion	Gen. I.H. Duval Mansion	May 16, 1986 (#86001071)	1222 Pleasant Ave. 40°16′27″N 80°36′27″W	Wellsburg	
8	Elmhurst	Elmhurst	May 16, 1986 (#86001072)	1606 Pleasant Ave. 40°16′47″N 80°36′22″W	Wellsburg	
9	David and Lucy Tarr Fleming Mansion	David and Lucy Tarr Fleming Mansion	May 16, 1986 (#86001073)	2000 Pleasant Ave. 40°16′55″N 80°36′20″W	Wellsburg	
10	Lewis Hall Mansion	Lewis Hall Mansion	May 16, 1986 (#86001074)	1300 Pleasant Ave. 40°16′31″N 80°36′27″W	Wellsburg	
11	Inn at Fowlerstown	Inn at Fowlerstown	October 29, 1992 (#92001483)	1001 Washington Pike (West Virginia Route 27); 40°16′47″N 80°33′18″W	Wellsburg	
12	Kirker House	Kirker House	September 15, 1986 (#86002883)	1520 Grand Ave. 40°16′43″N 80°36′20″W	Wellsburg	
13	Market Street Bridge	Market Street Bridge	March 21, 2019 (#100003517)	West Virginia Route 2 spur and Market Street; 40°21′28″N 80°36′28″W	East Steubenville	Extends into Jefferson County, Ohio
14	Miller's Tavern	Miller's Tavern	December 14, 1978 (#78002790)	6th and Main Sts. 40°16′09″N 80°36′50″W	Wellsburg	
15	Nicholls House and Woolen Mill Site	Nicholls House and Woolen Mill Site	November 13, 1997 (#97001416)	West Virginia Route 67, Wellsburg-Bethany Pike, overlooking Buffalo Creek; 40°15′27″N 80°36′03″W	Wellsburg	
16	Old Bethany Church	Old Bethany Church	December 12, 1976 (#76001932)	Main and Church Sts. 40°12′23″N 80°33′15″W	Bethany	
17	Old Main, Bethany College	Old Main, Bethany College	August 25, 1970 (#70000652)	Bethany College campus 40°12′21″N 80°33′37″W	Bethany	
18	Harry and Louisiana Beall Paull Mansion	Harry and Louisiana Beall Paull Mansion	May 16, 1986 (#86001075)	1312 Pleasant Ave. 40°16′29″N 80°36′23″W	Wellsburg	
19	Pendleton Heights	Pendleton Heights	June 26, 1975 (#75001882)	Bethany College campus 40°12′24″N 80°33′35″W	Bethany	
20	John C. Reeves House	John C. Reeves House	September 28, 2006 (#06000903)	100 Reeves Dr. 40°17′36″N 80°33′51″W	Wellsburg	
21	Lucy Tarr Mansion	Lucy Tarr Mansion	May 16, 1986 (#86001076)	1456 Pleasant Ave. 40°16′40″N 80°36′24″W	Wellsburg	
22	Vancroft	Vancroft	September 15, 1986 (#86002885)	Brinker Rd. 40°17′07″N 80°35′51″W	Wellsburg	
23	Wellsburg Historic District	Wellsburg Historic District	April 1, 1982 (#82004312)	West Virginia Route 2; 40°16′43″N 80°36′42″W	Wellsburg	
24	Wellsburg Wharf	Wellsburg Wharf	November 27, 1979 (#79002572)	6th and Main Sts. 40°16′09″N 80°36′52″W	Wellsburg	

== See also ==
- List of National Historic Landmarks in West Virginia
- National Register of Historic Places listings in West Virginia
