= Wellsburg Historic District =

Historic district in West Virginia, United States

- U.S. National Register of Historic Places
- U.S. Historic district
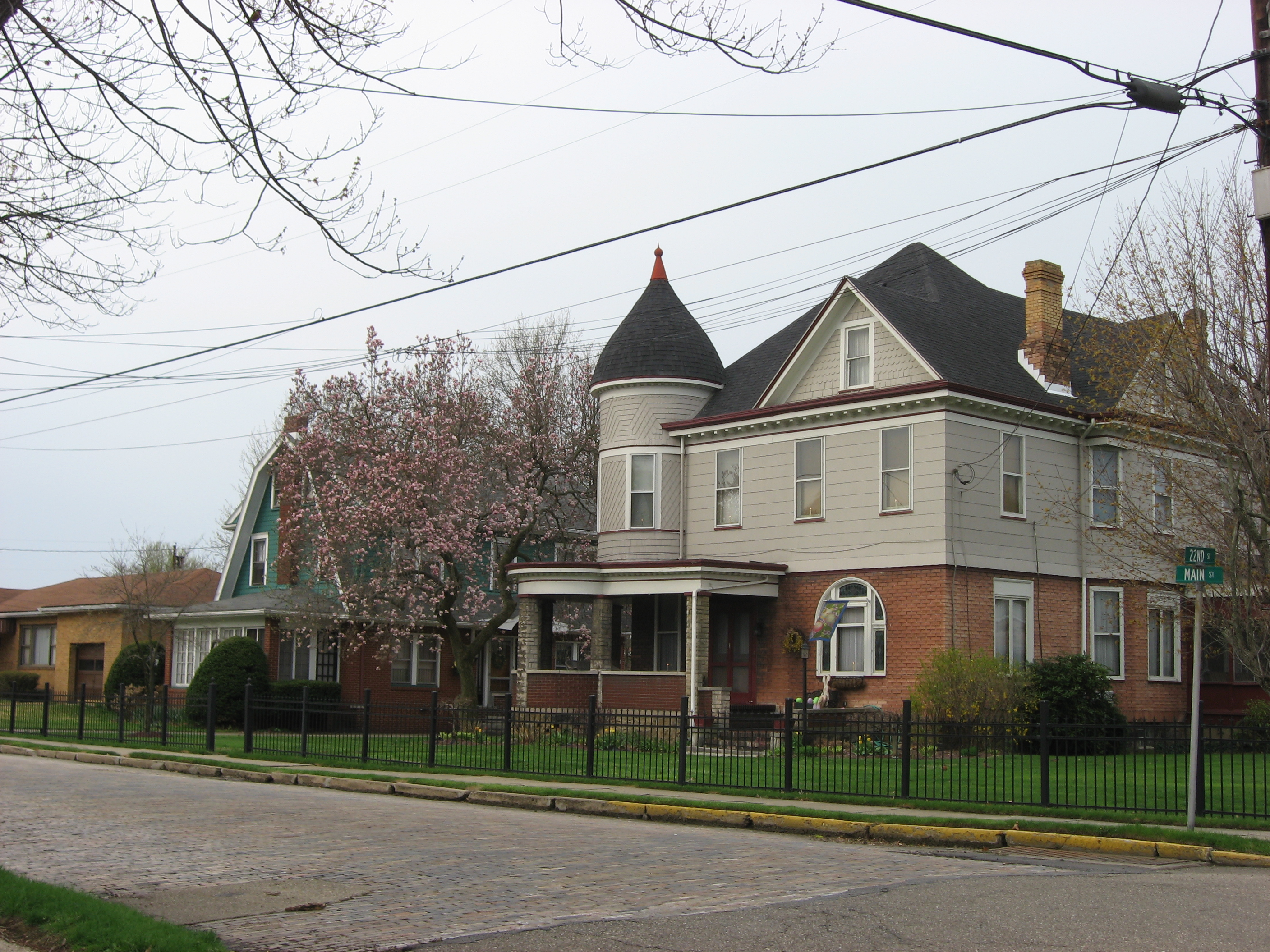
- Houses in the Wellsburg Historic District, April 2011

- Location within West Virginia Location within the United States
- Location: roughly bounded by 2nd Street, Charles Street, 29th Street, and the Ohio River, Wellsburg, West Virginia
- Coordinates: 40°16′43″N 80°36′42″W
- Area: 246 acres (100 ha)
- Built: 1772
- Architect: Multiple
- Architectural style: Greek Revival, Late Victorian, Federal
- NRHP reference No.: 82004312
- Added to NRHP: April 1, 1982

Wellsburg Historic District is a national historic district located at Wellsburg, Brooke County, West Virginia. It encompasses 693 contributing buildings in the central business district and surrounding residential areas of Wellsburg. Notable buildings include the Brooke County Courthouse (1836), Northwestern Bank of Virginia (1835), Christ Episcopal Church (1887), First Methodist Church (1853), Patrick Gass Cottage (1797, c. 1850), and Crescent Glass factory (c. 1900). Also in the district are a number of residences in popular architectural styles including Greek Revival and Late Victorian. Located within the district are the separately listed Miller's Tavern and Wellsburg Wharf.

It was listed on the National Register of Historic Places in 1982.
