= 150th Cavalry Regiment =

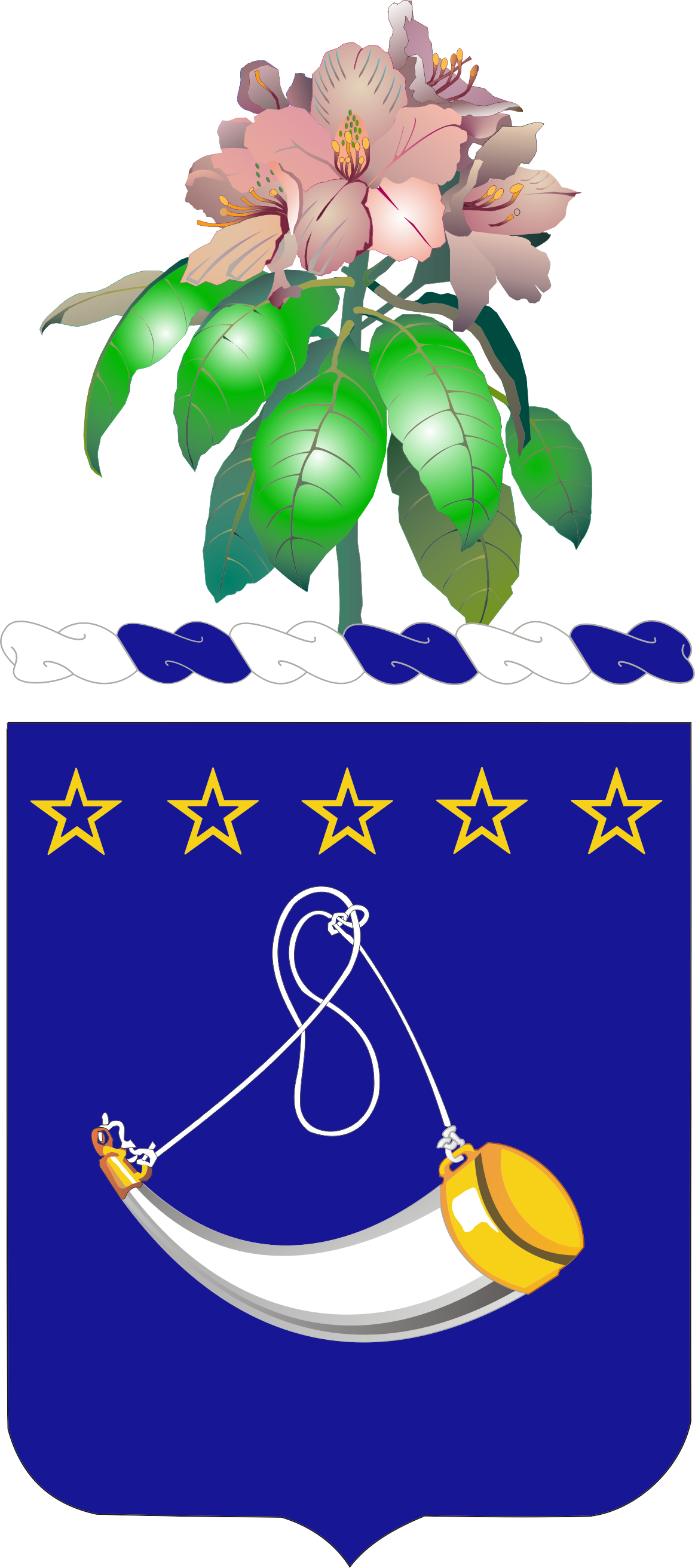
- Coat of arms
- Active: 1 March 1778–present
- Country: United States
- Branch: Army National Guard
- Type: Cavalry regiment
- Role: Reconnaissance, surveillance, and target acquisition
- Size: Regiment
- Garrison/HQ: Bluefield, West Virginia (Headquarters)
- Nickname: "The Second West Virginia" (Special Designation)
- Motto: "We Can Take It"
- Colors: Blue & Gold
- Equipment: M1 Abrams, Bradley Fighting Vehicle, Humvee
- Engagements: American Revolutionary War; War of 1812; American Civil War; Border War; World War I World War II; Iraq War; Operation Spartan Shield; American–led intervention in the Syrian Civil War

Insignia
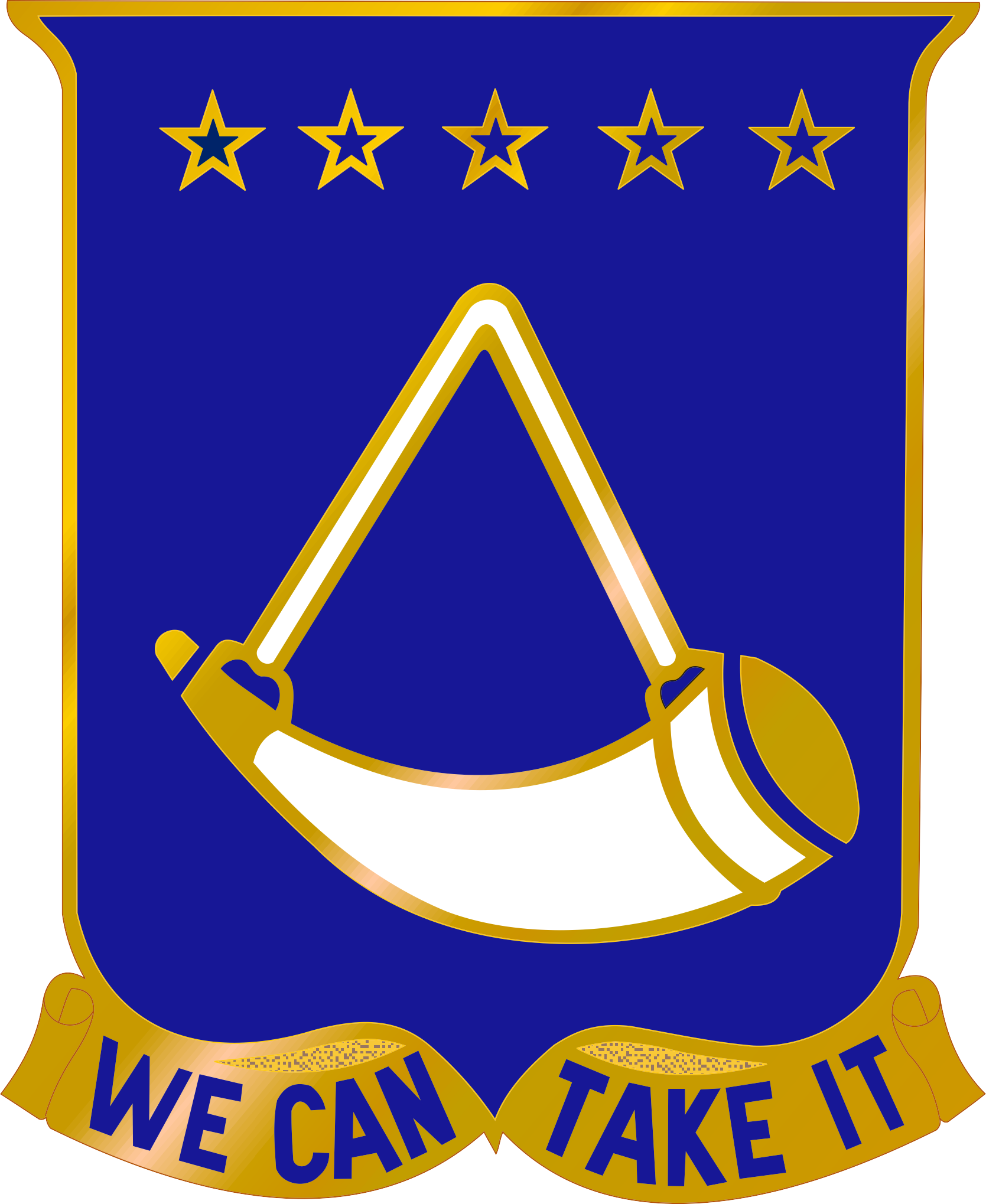
- DUI

The 150th Cavalry Regiment ("The Second West Virginia") is a regiment of the West Virginia Army National Guard, with troops in multiple locations throughout West Virginia and one troop (part of the North Carolina Army National Guard) in Sanford, North Carolina. It was originally formed as Greenbrier County militia, fighting for Virginia in the American Revolutionary War. During the American Civil War, companies of the regiment loyal to the recognized Union state government in Wheeling were later combined to form the Union Army's 5th and 9th West Virginia Infantry regiments, aiding in the defeat of Confederate troops in West Virginia, Ohio and Virginia.

Headquartered in Bluefield, West Virginia, the 150th Cavalry is the sole armored and cavalry unit of the West Virginia National Guard. The 150th is part of the 30th Armored Brigade Combat Team, which is in turn part of the 29th Infantry Division; both formations include Army National Guard forces from multiple states.

In addition to its past American Revolutionary War and American Civil War service, the 150th Cavalry has also deployed in support of World War I, the Border War with Mexico, World War II, Operation Spartan Shield, the Iraq War and the intervention in Syria.

== History ==
150th Cavalry in West Virginia
150th Cavalry in North Carolina

=== American Revolutionary War ===
The lineage of the 150th Cavalry Regiment dates back to 1 March 1778, with the formation of the Militia of Greenbrier County. On 22 December 1792, the Militia of Greenbrier County was reorganized as volunteer companies of the 13th Brigade, Virginia Militia. During the War of 1812, five companies from the 13th Brigade were combined with seven companies from what is now northern West Virginia to form the 2nd Regiment, Virginia Volunteer Militia.

=== American Civil War ===
During the American Civil War, units with Union sympathies were combined to form the 5th and 9th West Virginia Volunteer Infantry Regiment. After becoming a separate state in 1863, West Virginia reorganized its militia, including the 5th and 9th Regiments, which were consolidated and reorganized on 9 November 1864, as the 1st West Virginia Veteran Infantry Regiment, part of the 2nd Division, West Virginia Militia. The regiment was mustered out on 21 July 1865 after the end of the war.

On 7 June 1889, the 1st West Virginia Veteran Infantry Regiment was reorganized as the 2nd Regiment, West Virginia National Guard.

=== World War I ===
After being mustered into service for eight months along the Mexican border in 1916, it was briefly mustered out of service for less than a month only to be mustered back into federal service on 10 April 1917 after the American declaration of war on the German Empire. After being federalized it was consolidated with the 3rd Battalion and Headquarters Company (less Band), 1st West Virginia Infantry, on 19 September 1917 and the consolidated unit was designated the 150th Infantry Regiment and assigned to the 38th Division.

=== Interwar period ===
The 150th Infantry was demobilized on 5 January 1919 at Camp Zachary Taylor, Kentucky. Per the National Defense Act of 1920, the 150th Infantry was reconstituted in the National Guard in 1921, assigned to the 38th Division, and allotted to West Virginia. It was reorganized on 1 March 1923 when the regimental headquarters was organized and federally recognized at Welch, West Virginia. It conducted annual training most years at Camp William G. Conley, in Mason County, and some years at Camp Knox, Kentucky. For at least three years, 1931–33, the regiment also trained thirty-three company-grade Organized Reserve infantry officers of the 100th Division at Camp Conley. The regiment was inducted into federal service on 17 January 1941 and moved to Camp Shelby, Mississippi, where it arrived on 27 January 1941.

=== World War II ===
On 1 March 1942, the regiment was relieved from assignment the 38th Division and transferred to the Panama Canal Zone where it served through the rest of the war. Postwar, it was inactivated at Fort Clayton on 1 February 1946.

=== Cold War ===
After the war, the regiment went through a period of slow but drastic change. On 1 July 1955, the regiment was reorganized from an Infantry table of organization and equipment unit to an Armored Cavalry TO&E unit and redesignated as the 150th Armored Cavalry Regiment. On 1 March 1968, 2nd Squadron was relieved from the regiment and broken up to form other units within the West Virginia National Guard. Meanwhile, two months later, 3rd Squadron was redesignated as 3rd Squadron, 107th Armored Cavalry. 1st Squadron continued on as the only squadron remaining in the regiment until 1 September 1993, when the regiment was reorganized and redesignated as the 150th Armor Regiment, consisting of the 1st Battalion, and assigned to the 28th Infantry Division.

In 1993, D Troop, 1-150th Cavalry finished phasing out the last of its M48A5 Patton tanks, replacing them with the M1A1 Abrams.

=== Iraq War ===
When the 30th Enhanced Heavy Separate Brigade began mobilization to partake in Operation Iraqi Freedom in 2004, 1st Battalion, 150th Armor was chosen to reinforce the brigade. The battalion served with the brigade for approximately one year in Iraq and redeployed with the brigade back to the United States. Upon returning to the United States in 2005, 1st Battalion 150th Armor was redesignated as the 150th Cavalry, consisting of the 1st Squadron, reorganized as a reconnaissance, surveillance, and target acquisition squadron, and reassigned to the 30th Brigade as that brigade's RSTA squadron under the new Heavy Brigade Unit of Action TO&E. The 150th also deployed a second time with the 30th Brigade to Iraq during OIF-7 in 2009.

=== Spartan Shield and Inherent Resolve ===
"The Second West Virginia" deployed again in support of the War on Terror in 2019, for Operations Spartan Shield and Inherent Resolve. In 2019, B Troop of 1/150th Cav. Deployed to ATG, Syria in support of Special Forces groups. A Troop of 1/150th Cav. Deployed to northern Syria in support of Local forces. C Troop of 1/150th Cav. Deployed to tower 22 in Jordan in support of local forces and to support B Troop in Syria. D Troop of 1/150th Cav also mobilized to support 30th Armored Brigade Combat Team operations under Spartan Shield in 2019.

=== Recent events ===
Under the U.S. Army's Transformation-in-Contact initiative in early 2025, the 150th Cavalry was potentially slated to be disbanded, but after pushback from Governor Patrick Morrisey & Major General Jim Seward (WVNG Adjutant General), the 532 authorized personnel for 1-150th are instead to be retained, and the 150th reorganized into a Tactical Combat Formation that will carry the lineage of the regiment.

== Lineage ==
- Constituted 1 March 1778 as the Militia of Greenbrier County, Virginia
- Assigned 22 December 1792 to the 13th Brigade, Virginia Militia
- Re-designated 1812 as the 2nd Regiment, Virginia Volunteer Militia
- Activated October 18, 1861 as the 5th West Virginia Infantry Regiment
- Activated November 28, 1861 as the 9th West Virginia Infantry Regiment
- Re-designated 9 November 1864 as the 1st West Virginia Veteran Infantry Regiment by merging the 5th and 9th West Virginia.
- Inactivated 21 July 1865
- Re-designated 7 June 1889, 2nd Regiment, West Virginia National Guard
- Re-designated 10 April 1917 as the 150th Infantry Regiment
- Assigned 19 September 1917 to the 38th Infantry Division
- Relieved 1 March 1942 from assignment to 38th Infantry Division
- Inactivated 1 February 1946 at Fort Clayton, Panama Canal Zone.
- Re-designated 1 July 1955 as the 150th Armored Cavalry Regiment.
- 2nd Squadron, 150th Armored Cavalry disbanded 1 March 1968. Constituent units reassigned elsewhere in the West Virginia Army National Guard.
- 3rd Squadron, 150th Armored Cavalry re-designated as 3rd Squadron, 107th Armored Cavalry.
- Re-designated 1 September 1993 as the 150th Armor Regiment. Assigned to the 28th Infantry Division.
- Assigned 2004 to the 30th Armored Brigade Combat Team, 29th Infantry Division.
- Re-designated 2005 as the 150th Cavalry Regiment.

== Current organization ==
Today, 1st Squadron, 150th Cavalry Regiment is the only active squadron in the regiment. A, B, and C Troop each field the Bradley Fighting Vehicle, while D Troop provides heavy armor assets with the M1 Abrams tank. The 150th also uses wheeled vehicles like the Humvee across the regiment.

- Headquarters 1-150th Cavalry: Bluefield, West Virginia
- A Troop: Holden & Salem, West Virginia
- B Troop: Eleanor, West Virginia
- C Troop: Glen Jean, West Virginia
- D Troop: Sanford, North Carolina

Additionally, one support company is attached to the "Second West Virginia:"

- D Company, 230th Brigade Support Battalion: Glen Jean, West Virginia

== Distinctive unit insignia ==
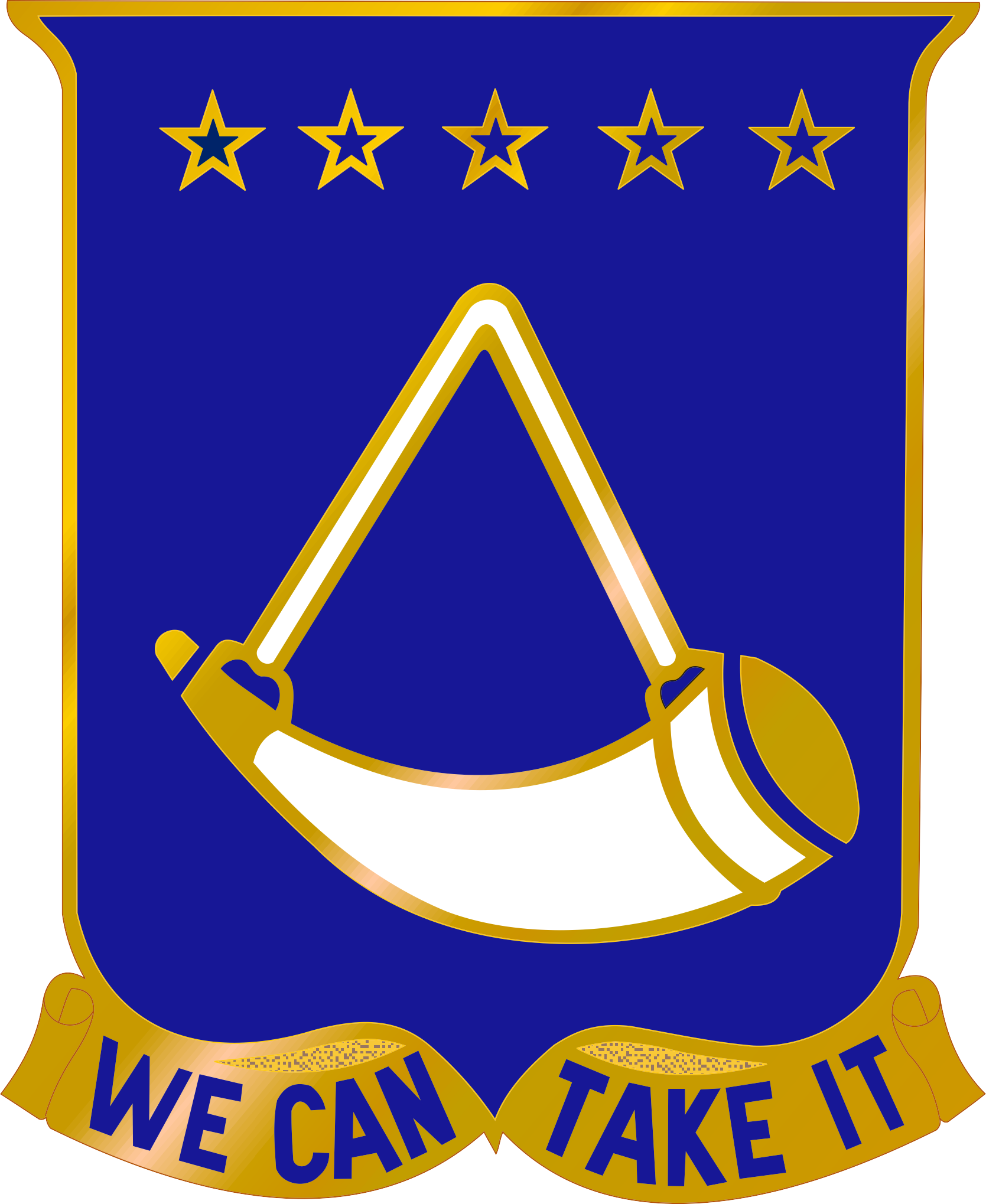
Distinctive Unit Insignia (DUI) of the 150th Cavalry, current revision approved 1 September 1993

- Description

A Gold color metal and enamel device 1 1/8 inches (2.9 cm) in height overall consisting of a shield blazoned: Azure, a powder horn Argent, mouth to dexter, ferruled Or, stringed of the second; in chief five mullets of the third voided. Attached below the shield a bipartite scroll inscribed "WE CAN TAKE IT" in Blue.

- Symbolism

The shield is blue, representative of the original organization. The powder horn is adapted from the State coat of arms. The five mullets symbolize the wars in which the original regiment participated.

- Background

The distinctive unit insignia was originally approved for the 150th Infantry Regiment on 28 May 1934. It was redesignated for the 150th Armored Cavalry Regiment on 21 September 1955. The insignia was redesignated for the 150th Armor Regiment with the description and symbolism revised effective 1 September 1993.

== Coat of arms ==
=== Blazon ===
- Shield

Azure, a powder horn Argent, mouth to dexter, ferruled Or, stringed of the second; in chief five mullets of the third voided.

- Crest

That for the regiments and separate battalions of the West Virginia Army National Guard: On a wreath of the colors, Argent and Azure, a slip of mountain rhododendron in full bloom and leaved Proper. Motto WE CAN TAKE IT.

- Symbolism
- Shield

The shield is blue, representative of the original organization. The powder horn is adapted from the State coat of arms. The five mullets symbolize the wars in which the original regiment participated.

- Crest

The crest is that of the West Virginia Army National Guard.

- Background

The coat of arms was originally approved for the 150th Infantry Regiment on 28 May 1934. It was redesignated for the 150th Armored Cavalry Regiment on 21 September 1955. The insignia was redesignated for the 150th Armor Regiment with the symbolism revised effective 1 September 1993.

== See also ==
- List of armored and cavalry regiments of the United States Army

== In popular culture ==
- The 2020 military fiction novel, Assault by Fire, by H. Ripley Rawlings, prominently features the 150th of the West Virginia National Guard holding back a Russian attack on the U.S.
