= Brooke Cemetery =

- U.S. National Register of Historic Places
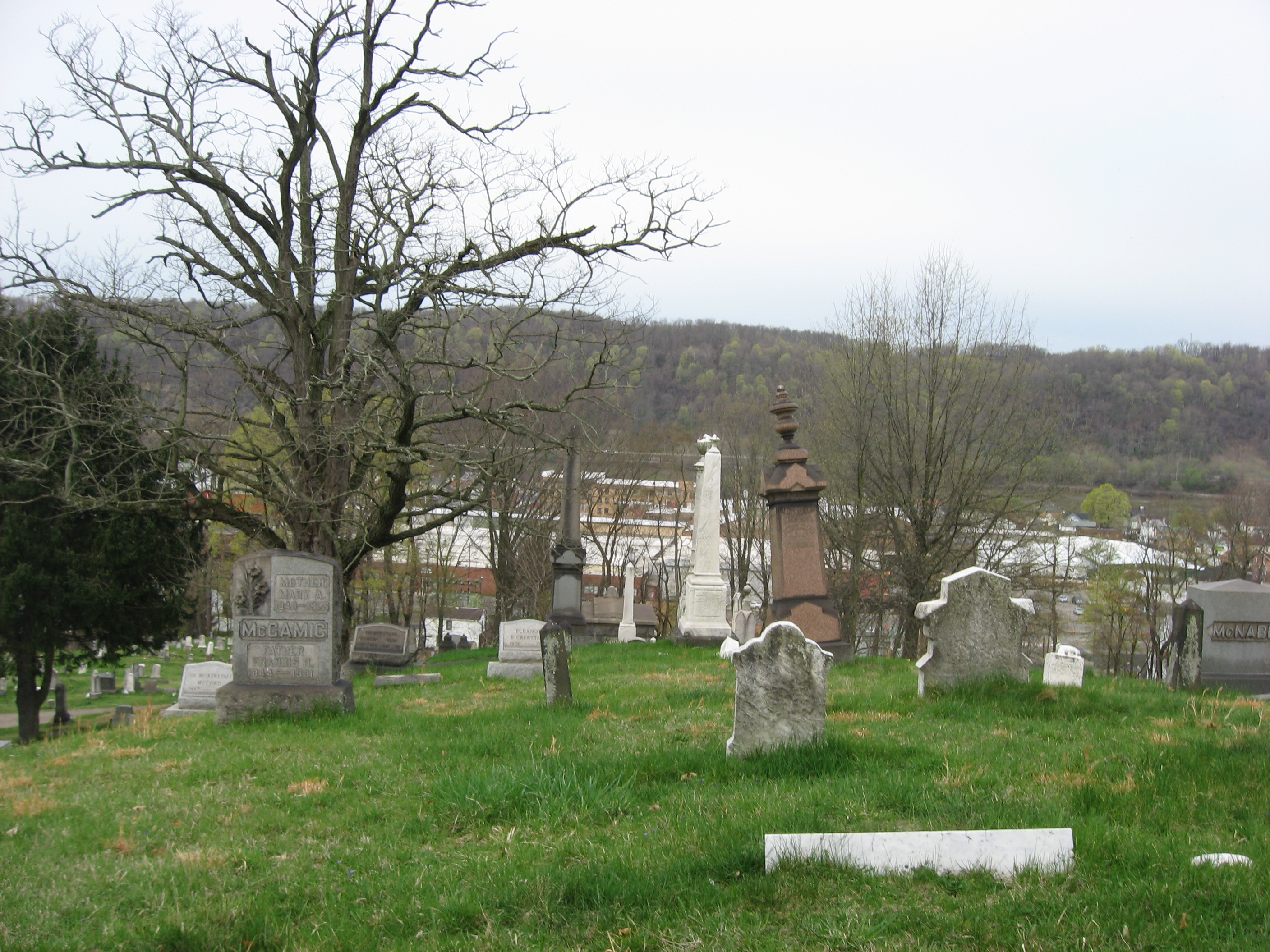
- Brooke Cemetery, April 2011

- Location within West Virginia Location within the United States
- Location: 2200 Pleasant Ave., Wellsburg, West Virginia
- Coordinates: 40°17′15″N 80°36′17″W
- Area: 23 acres (9.3 ha)
- Built: 1857
- Architect: Chislett, John
- Architectural style: Classical Revival, Greek Revival, Modern Movement
- MPS: Pleasant Avenue MRA
- NRHP reference No.: 86001070
- Added to NRHP: May 16, 1986

Brooke Cemetery is a historic rural cemetery located at Wellsburg, Brooke County, West Virginia. It was founded in 1857. It includes several notable examples of funerary art in its headstones, above ground crypts, and mausolea dating to the 19th and early 20th century. It was designed by John Chislett, who also designed Allegheny Cemetery in Pittsburgh, Pennsylvania.

It was listed on the National Register of Historic Places in 1986.

== Noteworthy interments ==
- Oliver Brown (1753–1846), Brooke County Militia and Revolutionary War officer
- Isaac H. Duval (1824–1902), member of the United States House of Representatives from 1869 to 1871, and a brigadier general in the Union Army
- Patrick Gass (1771–1870), member of the Corps of Discovery
