= Beallmore =

Historic house in West Virginia, United States

- U.S. National Register of Historic Places
- Beallmore

- Location within West Virginia Location within the United States
- Location: 1500 Pleasant Ave., Wellsburg, West Virginia
- Coordinates: 40°16′42″N 80°36′24″W
- Area: 0.7 acres (0.28 ha)
- Built: 1907
- Architectural style: Classical Revival
- MPS: Pleasant Avenue MRA
- NRHP reference No.: 86001069
- Added to NRHP: May 16, 1986

Beallmore, also known as the William T. Jr., and June Booher House, is a historic mansion located at Wellsburg, Brooke County, West Virginia. It was built in 1907, and is a 2 /2 story brick dwelling with a hipped roof in the Classical Revival style. The brick used is a pressed, glazed orange brick. It features a two-story, tetrastyle portico supported by fluted Corinthian order columns.

It was listed on the National Register of Historic Places in 1986.
