= Gen. I.H. Duval Mansion =

Historic house in West Virginia, United States

- U.S. National Register of Historic Places
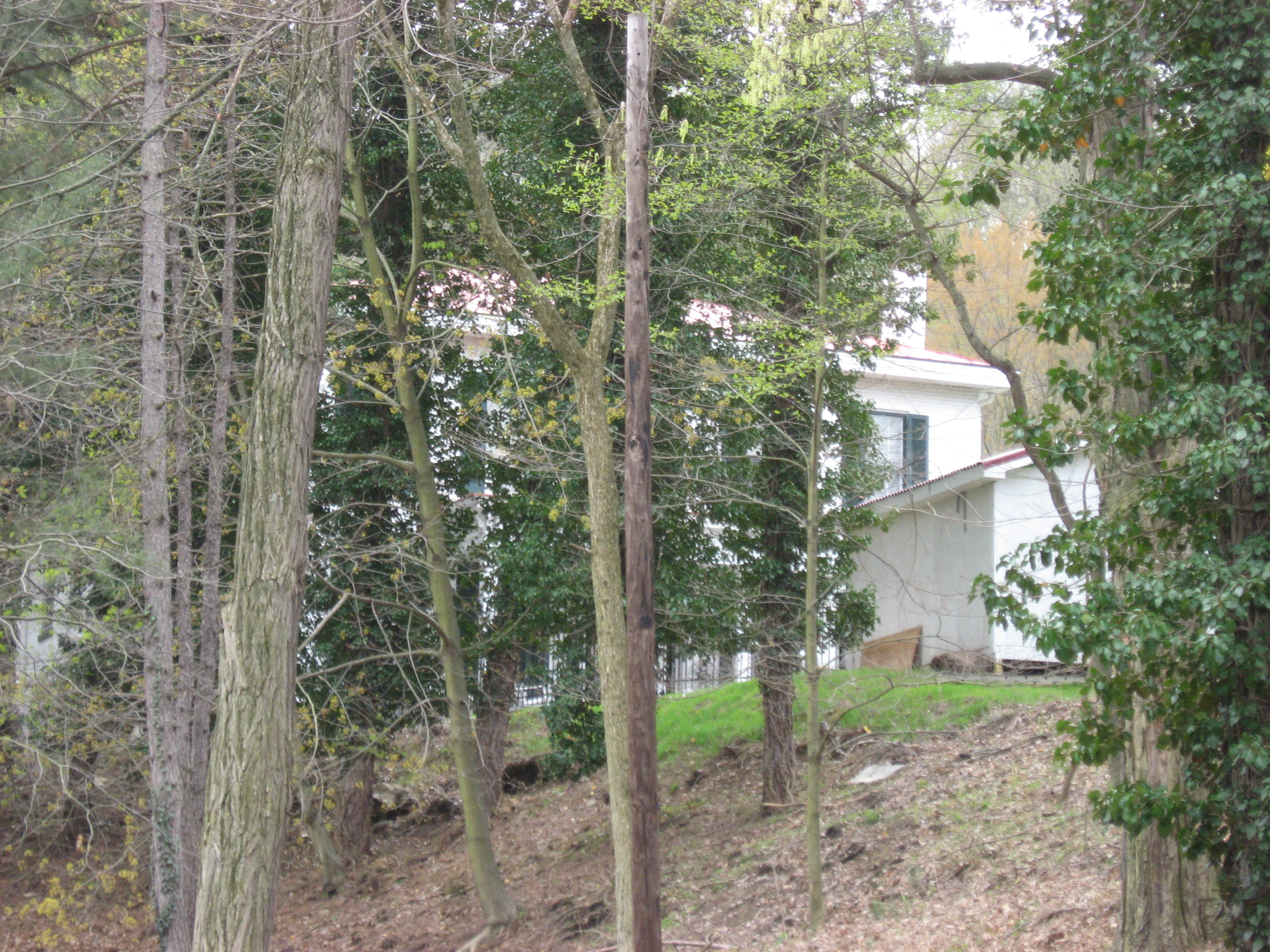
- Gen. I.H. Duval Mansion, April 2011

- Location within West Virginia Location within the United States
- Location: 1222 Pleasant Ave., Wellsburg, West Virginia
- Coordinates: 40°16′27″N 80°36′27″W
- Area: 2.9 acres (1.2 ha)
- Built: 1858
- Architect: John Moran
- Architectural style: Greek Revival
- MPS: Pleasant Avenue MRA
- NRHP reference No.: 86001071
- Added to NRHP: May 16, 1986

Gen. I.H. Duval Mansion, also known as the General I.H. Duval House No. 4 and Charles D. and Marjorie Bell Residence, is a historic country home located at Wellsburg, Brooke County, West Virginia. It was built in 1858, and is a two-story, five-bay, rectangular brick dwelling with a hipped roof in the Greek Revival style. It features a three-bay portico with a hipped roof and supported by squared Tuscan order columns. It was built by American Civil War General and Congressman Isaac H. Duval (1824-1902).

It was listed on the National Register of Historic Places in 1986.
