= Kirker House =

Historic house in West Virginia, United States

- U.S. National Register of Historic Places
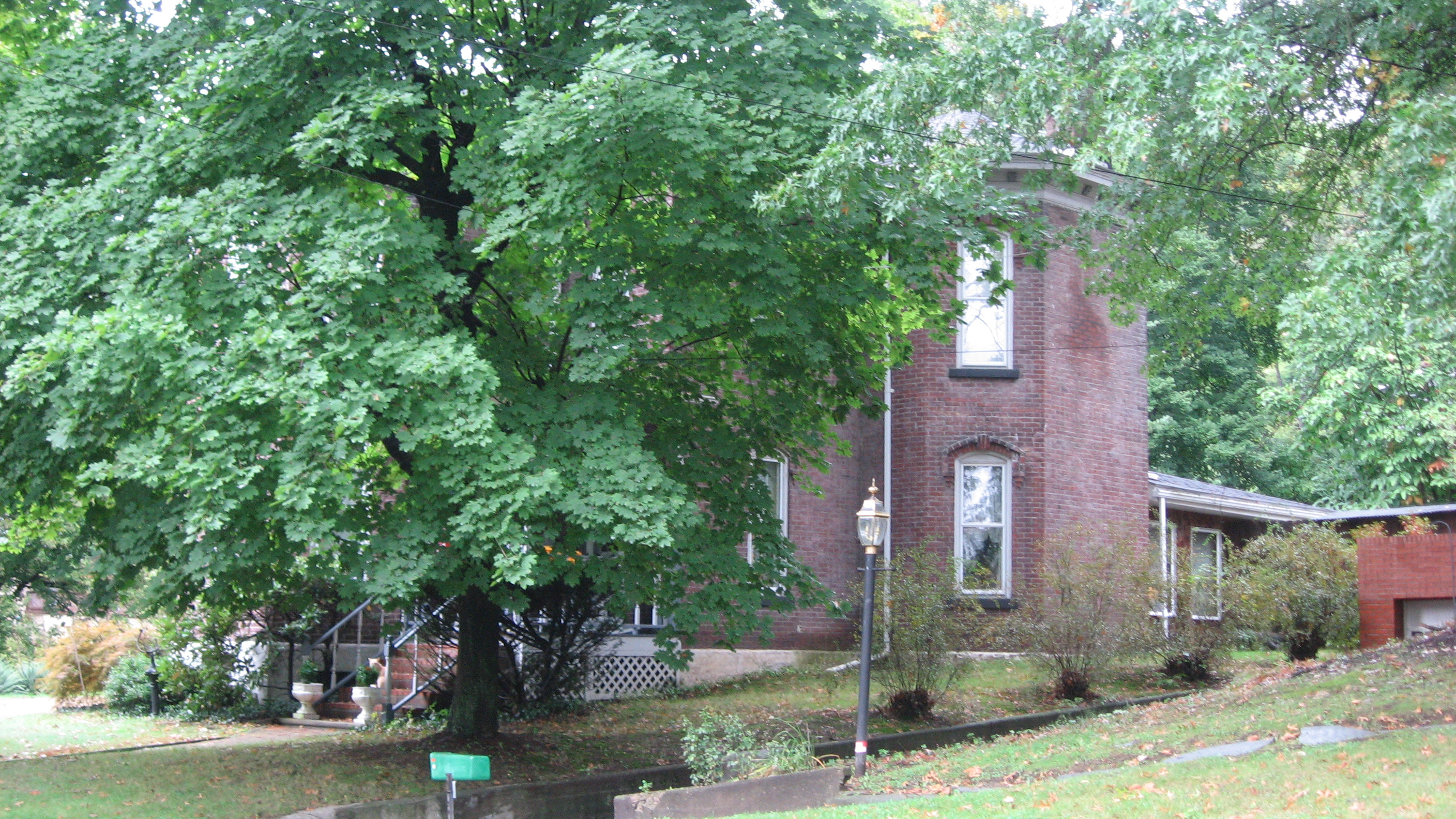
- Front and side of the house

- Location within West Virginia Location within the United States
- Location: 1520 Grand Ave., Wellsburg, West Virginia
- Coordinates: 40°16′43″N 80°36′20″W
- Area: 0.4 acres (0.16 ha)
- Built: 1884
- Architect: Matthews, James H.
- Architectural style: Italianate
- MPS: Pleasant Avenue MRA
- NRHP reference No.: 86002883
- Added to NRHP: September 15, 1986

Kirker House, also known as the Daniel and Donna Finell House, is a historic home located at Wellsburg, Brooke County, West Virginia. It was built in 1884 and is a two-story, rectangular brick dwelling in the High Victorian Italianate style. It measures 42 by 35 feet (13 m × 11 m) and has a shallow-pitched hipped roof.

It was listed on the National Register of Historic Places in 1986.
