= Nicholls House and Woolen Mill Site =

Historic house in West Virginia, United States

- U.S. National Register of Historic Places
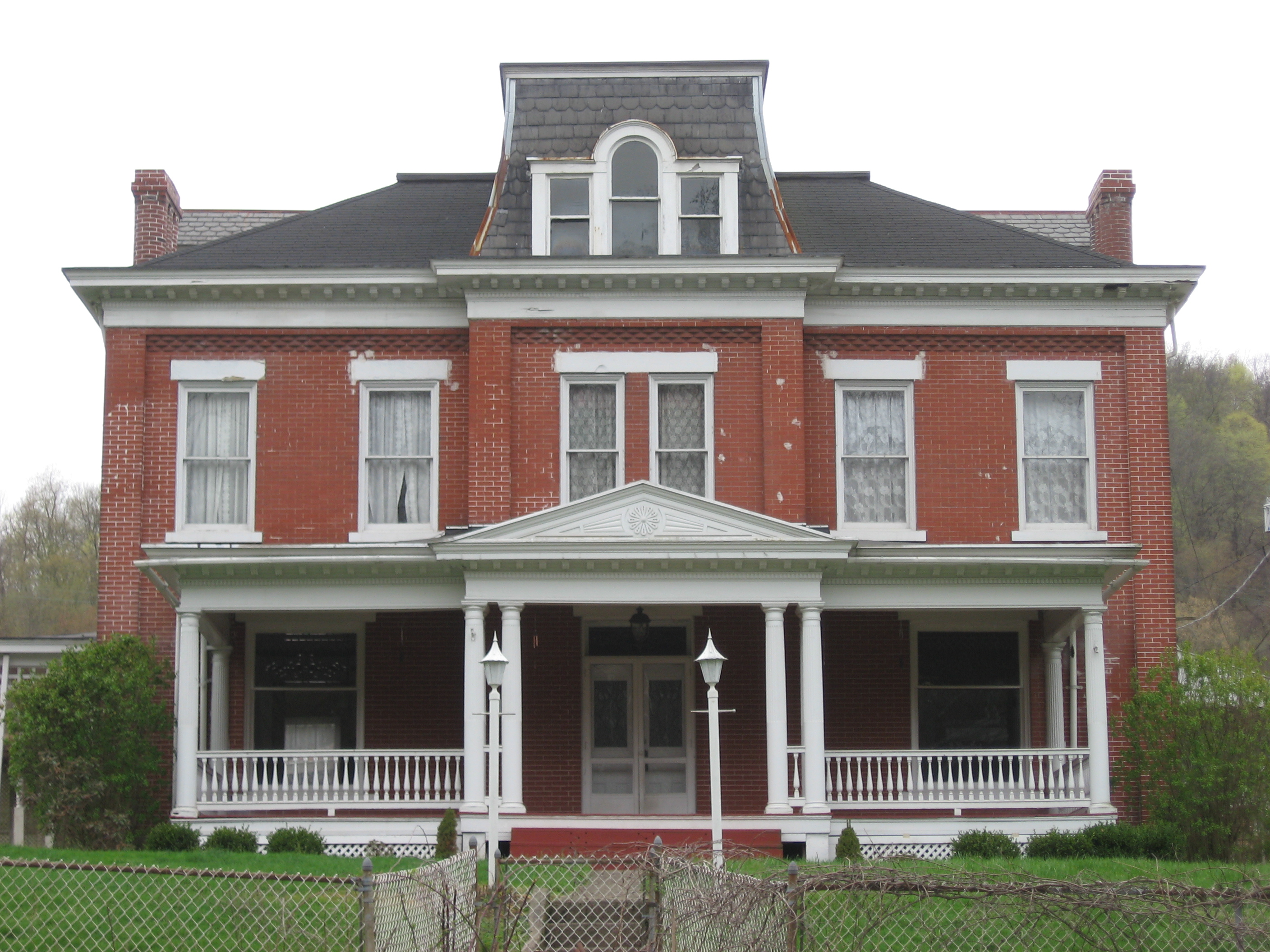
- William T. Nicholls House, April 2011

- Location within West Virginia Location within the United States
- Location: WV 67, Wellsburg-Bethany Pike, overlooking Buffalo Cr., Wellsburg, West Virginia
- Coordinates: 40°15′27″N 80°36′3″W
- Area: 1 acre (0.40 ha)
- Built: 1795, 1893
- Architectural style: Second Empire
- NRHP reference No.: 97001416
- Added to NRHP: November 13, 1997

Nicholls House and Woolen Mill Site is a historic home and mill site located near Wellsburg, Brooke County, West Virginia. The house was built in 1893, and is a 2 1/2-story, red-glazed brick building in the Second Empire style. It has a tower and mansard roof. It features a full front porch with Doric order columns in the Colonial Revival style. The property also includes the site of a mill used for carding and manufacturing woolens dating to 1795.

It was listed on the National Register of Historic Places in 1997.
