= 9th West Virginia Infantry Regiment =

- Flag of West Virginia
- Active: November 28, 1861, to November 9, 1864
- Country: United States
- Allegiance: Union
- Branch: Infantry
- Engagements: Skirmish at Guyandotte; Battle of Charleston (1862); Battle of Buffington Island; George Crook's Raid; Battle of Cloyd's Mountain; David Hunter's Raid; Battle of Opequon; Battle of Fisher's Hill; Battle of Cedar Creek

The 9th West Virginia Infantry Regiment was an infantry regiment that served in the Union Army during the American Civil War.

== Service ==
=== Organization ===
The 9th West Virginia Infantry Regiment was organized at Guyandotte, in western Virginia between November 28, 1861, and April 30, 1862. Its major was congressman Kellian Whaley.

In April 1862, two periods of recruitments were made with the earlier at Cottageville. About two weeks later, Company K was recruited from those who worked the riverboats and repair out of Kanawha Harbor and the other landings. These were often detailed on board to protect the packet boats and river crossings. They were recruited by Col. Kellian Whaley and Lt. Col. William C. Starr. Starr was the General Manager of the Hartford Salt Works and was familiar with the river logistics workers. Kellian Whaley, of the timber business, was also familiar with the riverboat repairmen in supplying material and wood fuel to the steamboat business. Elements of the 9th WVIR and 8th WVIR were stationed at Point Pleasant, W. Va., District of the Kanawha, W. Va., Dept. of the Ohio, October, 1862 to March, 1863. Theodore Lang writes, "The regiment was composed largely of refugees, who, having been driven from home, were fighting with a desperation that was not excelled by any troops in any army." Joe Geiger (Vol 54 1995:28-41) writes of 1861, "July 13, however, the Second Kentucky moved into the Kanawha Valley and civil chaos in the county resumed unchecked."

This organizing Union infantry was recruited from the counties along the Ohio, Kanawha and Little Kanawha rivers and their tributaries. During this recruiting phase, it was first attached to the District of the Kanawha, West Virginia, to May, 1862. It was transferred to the 4th Brigade, Kanawha Division, West Virginia, to September, 1862. Next, it was reassigned to the District of the Kanawha, West Virginia, Dept. of the Ohio, to January, 1863. The 9th was assigned to Milroy's Command, Winchester, Va., 8th Army Corps, Middle Department, to February, 1863. Its following command was under the 2nd Brigade, 2nd Division, 8th Army Corps, to June, 1863. After this, the 9th was assigned to its home region to the 1st Brigade, Scammon's Division, West Virginia, to August, 1863. Change in command structure led the 9th Infantry to its home area command of the 2nd Brigade, Scammon's Division, West Virginia, to December, 1863. As West Virginia was now recognized as a state, the 9th was assigned to the 2nd Brigade, 3rd Division, West Virginia, to April, 1864. The 9th Infantry's last command assignment was the 2nd Brigade, 2nd Infantry Division, West Virginia, to November, 1864.

=== Initial service: 1861-62 ===
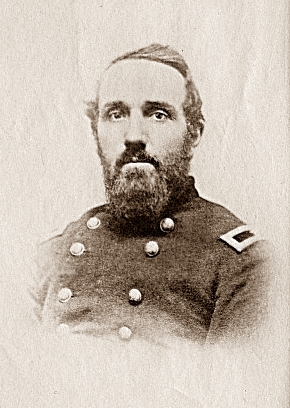
Brigadier General Joseph Andrew Jackson Lightburn, ca. 1864 Broad Run Baptist Church Cemetery Lightburn, Lewis County, West Virginia, beautifully engraved Sword and Scabbard is hanging in the Lewis County Court House in Weston. He is known in the state as "the fighting parson."

From November to July, 1861, the recruits were assigned to garrison duty in the Kanawha Valley with detachments at Fayette, Gauley Bridge, Summersville, Point Pleasant, Coalsmouth and Calhoun until July, 1862. Some companies scouted in Roane and Clay Counties from May 8 to the 21st. Companies "A" and "F" saw action at Summersville on July 25. They moved over to Flat Top Mountain on July 28 and then to the battles at Summersville and Gauley August 14. The Union had ordered 5,000 troops away from the Kanawha region to Virginia which left the region undermanned and led to the Confederate Kanawha Valley Campaign of 1862. As a first step in the campaign, Albert G. Jenkins and his 550 Confederate Cavalry circled through western Virginia and moved behind the small Union force in the Kanawha Valley. Jenkins took control of the towns from Monroe County to Jackson County and raided from there into Ohio during the month of August, 1862. A feint toward the Baltimore and Ohio Railroad may have been a diversion tactic, but Jenkins accomplished his goal of moving into position to prevent a Union retreat.

Meanwhile, General William W. Loring pushed back Joseph A. J. Lightburn at Fayetteville to Charleston on September 11. Lightburn and the staff decided a retreat was necessary. Elements fought at Cotton Hill and Gauley Ferry on September 11 and again at Charleston on September 13, slowing Loring's advance. This allowed time for an armada of packets and barges to assist evacuations during the Battle of Charleston. The flotilla of barges and civilian packets evacuated the salt miners, residents and civilian government during the "Confederate Overrun of Charleston, West Virginia". The local privateer packets had small cannons. They were alongside of the 9th at the mouth of Elk River and the 5th Infantry on the Kanawha, firing into the main Confederate columns coming down the Kanawha River until all the civil boats and barges were well underway to Point Pleasant. Then Lightburn's cavalry fought their way back to the road to Ravenswood drawing away some of Loring's cavalry while privateers blasted into the Confederate Infantry, but was followed by Confederate field artillery.

Having held their line, the 9th and 5th infantry began their boarding side boats and moving the skirmish line down river towards Point Pleasant. Loring's infantry fight progressed down the Kanawha shores well above the refugee fleet seemingly going to take the fight all the way to the mouth of the river. Lightburn had figured on rejoining the frontline troops at the mouth of the Kanawha where an Ohio artillery detachment set a trap for Loring's troops. Some historians have regarded this as one of the most intelligent execution of a military recall and retreat manoeuvre exercised. But, Loring knew when to stop his push. The Confederate occupation of six weeks was for the salt from which they caravan to the south to keep their meats supply from spooling.

A counter-assault took the Union some time to reorganize and was executed from October 21 to November 10, 1862. The 9th and 5th were a part of the Union expedition up the Kanawha Valley by boat and horse. General Loring withdrew and left the salt works destroyed. Stationed at Point Pleasant to guard the packets and refugees, the K-Company had a significant number civilian steamboat workers recruited.

=== 1863-64 ===
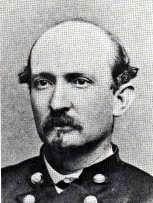
General I. H. Duval was a State Senator, sessions of 1866-7; Adjutant General of West Virginia; State House of Delegates 1887-1889; buried at Brooke Cemetery Wellsburg, West Virginia.

From January to June, 1863, the 9th Infantry was ordered to Winchester and then Beverly. They scouted to Wardensville, Strasburg, and the area from April 25 to the 30th. They were at Winchester on May the 4th. The 9th marched to West Creek arriving on May 23 and back again to Winchester June 18. After these skirmishes and battles they were recalled to their routine sentry duty guarding river fords and towns in the Kanawha Valley until May, 1864. They were the sentry line on the West Virginia shores during the Battle of Buffington Island.

In the spring of 1864, the 9th was ordered to join George Crook's expedition against the Virginia and Tennessee Railroad which took place from May 2 to the 19th. They took action at Cloyd's Mountain on May 9 and at New River Bridge on May 10. Some elements were at Cove Mountain or Grassy Lick near Wytheville on May 10, also. The 9th fought at Salt Pond Mountain and Gap Mountain on May 12 and the 13th. Soon afterwards, they were assigned to Major General David Hunter's expedition against Lynchburg from May 26 to July 1. They fought at Lexington on June 11, moved on to battle at Diamond Hill June 17 and marched to the battle at Lynchburg on June 17 and July 18. A recall was ordered and July 9 retreated to Charleston from June 19 to July 1. Moving from there, they were at Buford's Gap June 20 and around the Salem area on June 21.

The 9th skirmished the Shenandoah Valley from July 12 to 15. The marched to Stephenson's Depot July 20. They were at the Battle of Kernstown, Winchester, July 23 to 24th and Martinsburg on July 25. Several of the best men were selected for detached service in Blazer's Scouts, a mounted unit that was to guard supply lines and combat John S. Mosby's rangers.

The 9th West Virginia Infantry was a part of Sheridan's Shenandoah Valley Campaign August from 6th to November 1. They were at Halltown August 24 and 26 and Berryville September 3. They participated in the Battle of Opequon, Winchester, September 19. They moved on to Fisher's Hill September 22. From there, the 9th took part in the Battle of Cedar Creek on October 19. From there, they marched to Camp Russell and remained until November, 1864.

The 9th West Virginia was amalgamated with 5th West Virginia Volunteer Infantry Regiment on November 9, 1864, to create the 1st West Virginia Veteran Volunteer Infantry Regiment.

After the war, General Isaac H. Duval recounted, "We were in some defeats as well as many victories, and in our defeats and retreats the Ninth Regiment was never panic-stricken, but always came off as it went into battle, shoulder to shoulder. We never allowed the enemy to go through us in advancing or retreating."

== Casualties ==
The 9th West Virginia Volunteer Infantry Regiment suffered 3 Officers and 96 enlisted men killed in battle or died from wounds, and 1 officer and 107 enlisted men dead from disease for a total of 207 fatalities.

== Colonels ==
Colonel Leonard Skinner, December, 1861.

Lieutenant-colonel William C. Starr, December, 1861.

Major Benjamin M. Skinner December, 1861.

Colonel Isaac H. Duval, September 9, 1862.

Colonel Carr B. White, Brigade Commander May 9, 1864.

== See also ==
- West Virginia Units in the Civil War
- West Virginia in the Civil War
