= Isaac H. Duval =

American politician

Isaac Harding Duval
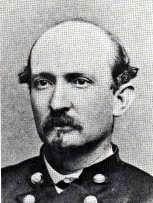
- Born: September 1, 1824; Wellsburg, Virginia (now West Virginia)
- Died: July 10, 1902 (aged 77); Wellsburg, West Virginia
- Burial place: Brooke Cemetery, Wellsburg, West Virginia
- Spouse: Mary Deborah Kuhn
- Children: 9 children
- Military career
- Allegiance: United States of America; Union
- Branch: United States Army; Union Army
- Service years: 1861 - 1866
- Rank: Brigadier General; Brevet Major General
- Commands: 9th West Virginia Infantry; Kanawha Division
- Conflicts: American Civil War

Isaac Harding Duval (September 1, 1824 – July 10, 1902) was an adventurer and businessman prior to becoming a brigadier general in the Union Army during the American Civil War. He was a reconstruction era U.S. representative from West Virginia in the 41st United States Congress.

== Early life and career ==
Duval was born and raised in Wellsburg, West Virginia (then Virginia) in Brooke County. He attended the common schools as a child. As a young man, he traveled to Fort Smith, Arkansas, where he joined an elder brother who was running a trading post. Afterward, he became a scout on the Western Plains and Rocky Mountains, and joined the Gold Rush in 1849.

He was a member of the Lopez expedition to Cuba that sought to aid the Cuban national independence movement. After his time as a filibuster, he returned to Wellsburg in 1853 and worked as a merchant.

== Civil War ==
During the Civil War, Duval was commissioned as the first major of the 1st Virginia Volunteer Infantry on June 1, 1861. He was later promoted to colonel of the 9th West Virginia Volunteer Infantry. In September 1864, he was badly wounded in his thigh at the Battle of Opequon. After he recovered, he was promoted to the rank of brigadier general and given charge of a brigade of infantry in the VIII Corps.

By the end of the war, Duval had fought in 36 separate engagements and commanded two different divisions in the VIII Corps. He had eleven horses killed and wounded under him. On May 17, 1865, after the surrender of the main Confederate armies under Generals Lee and Johnston, but with some other Confederate units still in the field in the west, an unknown attacker tried to kill Duval at Staunton, Virginia. Duval was mustered out of the volunteer service on January 15, 1866. On February 24, 1866, President Andrew Johnson nominated Duval for appointment to the brevet grade of major general of volunteers, to rank from March 13, 1865, and the U.S. Senate confirmed the nomination on May 4, 1866.

== Postbellum career ==
After completing his Union Army service, Duval returned to West Virginia, where he served as member of the West Virginia Senate and as the state's adjutant general from 1867 to 1869. He was elected as a Republican to the Forty-first Congress (March 4, 1869–March 3, 1871). He declined to be a candidate for renomination in 1870.

He then served as States Assessor of Internal Revenue in 1871 and 1872. He worked as the U.S. Collector of Internal Revenue for the first district of West Virginia from 1872 to 1884. He served as member of the West Virginia House of Delegates from 1887 to 1889.

Duval died in Wellsburg, West Virginia, on July 10, 1902, and was buried at Brooke Cemetery. His country home, known as the Gen. I.H. Duval Mansion, was listed on the National Register of Historic Places in 1986.

== See also ==
- List of American Civil War generals (Union)
- West Virginia's congressional delegations

== Notes ==
U.S. House of Representatives
Preceded by Chester D. Hubbard	Member of the U.S. House of Representatives from West Virginia's 1st congressional district 1869-1871	Succeeded by John James Davis
