= John C. Reeves House =

Historic house in West Virginia, United States

- U.S. National Register of Historic Places
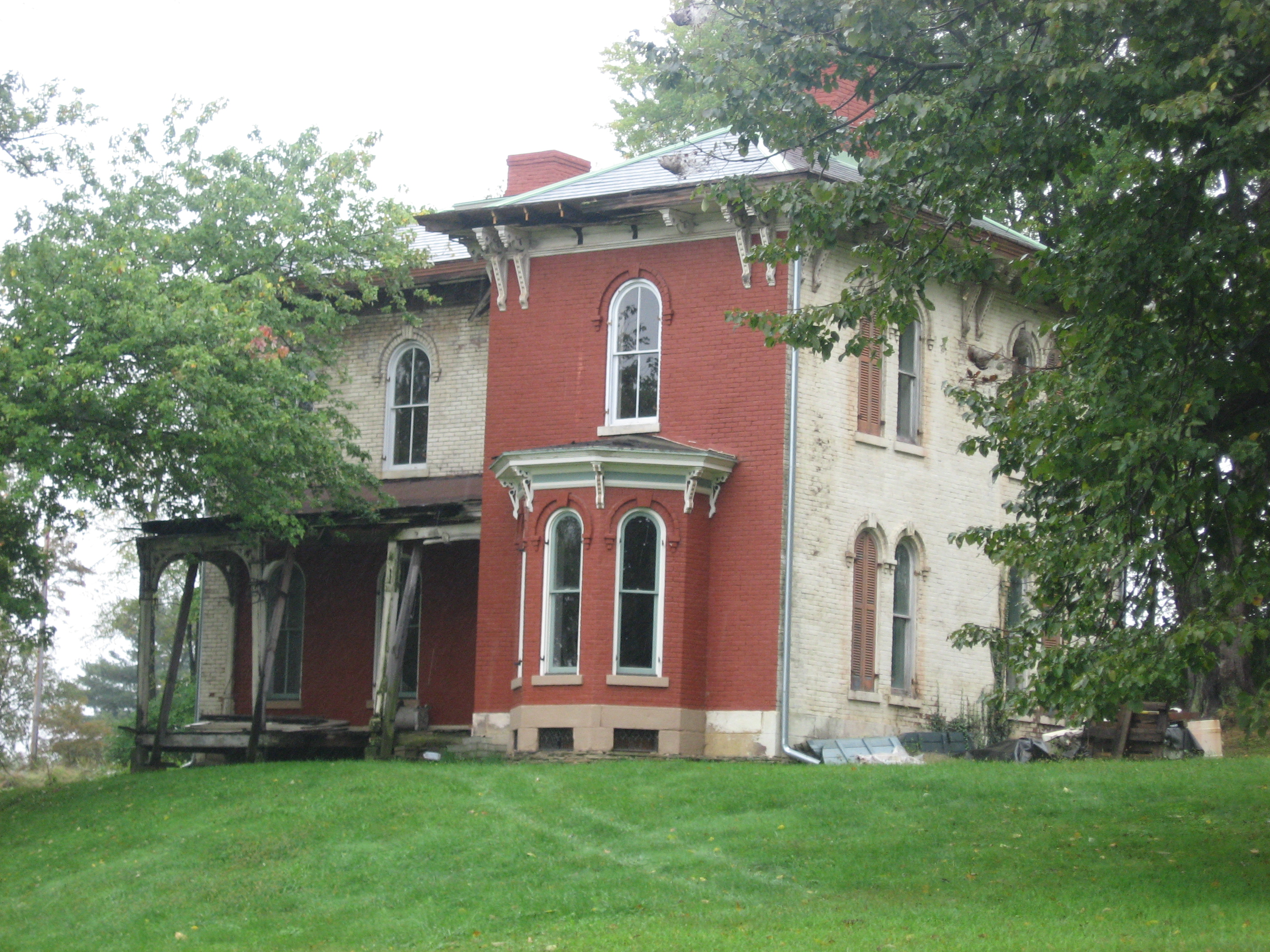
- Front and side of the house

- Location within West Virginia Location within the United States
- Location: 100 Reeves Dr., near Wellsburg, West Virginia
- Coordinates: 40°17′44″N 80°33′51″W
- Area: 2.3 acres (0.93 ha)
- Built: c. 1870
- Architectural style: Italianate
- NRHP reference No.: 06000903
- Added to NRHP: September 28, 2006

John C. Reeves House is a historic home located near Wellsburg, Brooke County, West Virginia. It was built about 1870 and is a two-story, painted brick Italianate style farmhouse. It sits on a foundation of smooth limestone blocks. It features tall and narrow windows, with semi-circular lintels.

It was listed on the National Register of Historic Places in 2006.
