= Lucy Tarr Mansion =

Historic house in West Virginia, United States

- U.S. National Register of Historic Places
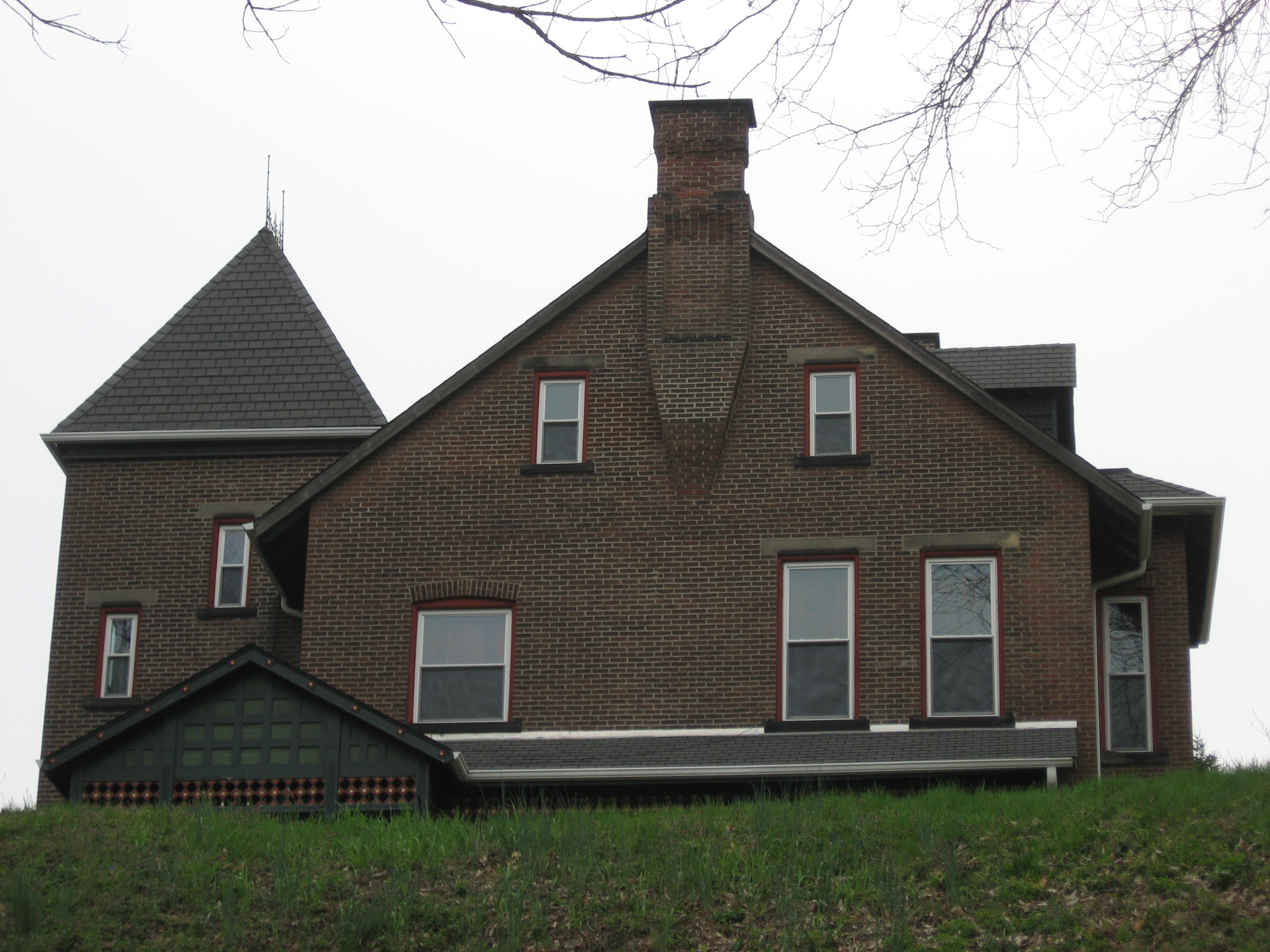
- Lucy Tarr Mansion, April 2011

- Location within West Virginia Location within the United States
- Location: 1456 Pleasant Ave., Wellsburg, West Virginia
- Coordinates: 40°16′40″N 80°36′24″W
- Area: less than one acre
- Built: 1885
- Architect: Tarr, Ellen Hunter
- Architectural style: Queen Anne
- MPS: Pleasant Avenue MRA
- NRHP reference No.: 86001076
- Added to NRHP: May 16, 1986

Lucy Tarr Mansion, also known as "Highland Place" and Nellie Little House, is a historic home located at Wellsburg, Brooke County, West Virginia. It was built in 1885, and is a 2 1/2-story brick dwelling with highly pitched roofs and richly appointed porches in the Queen Anne style. It features a three-story tower with a pyramidal roof covered in fishscale slate. It also has a one-story, ell shaped verandah with turned columns. Also on the property is a contributing barn / garage.

It was listed on the National Register of Historic Places in 1986.

== Gallery ==
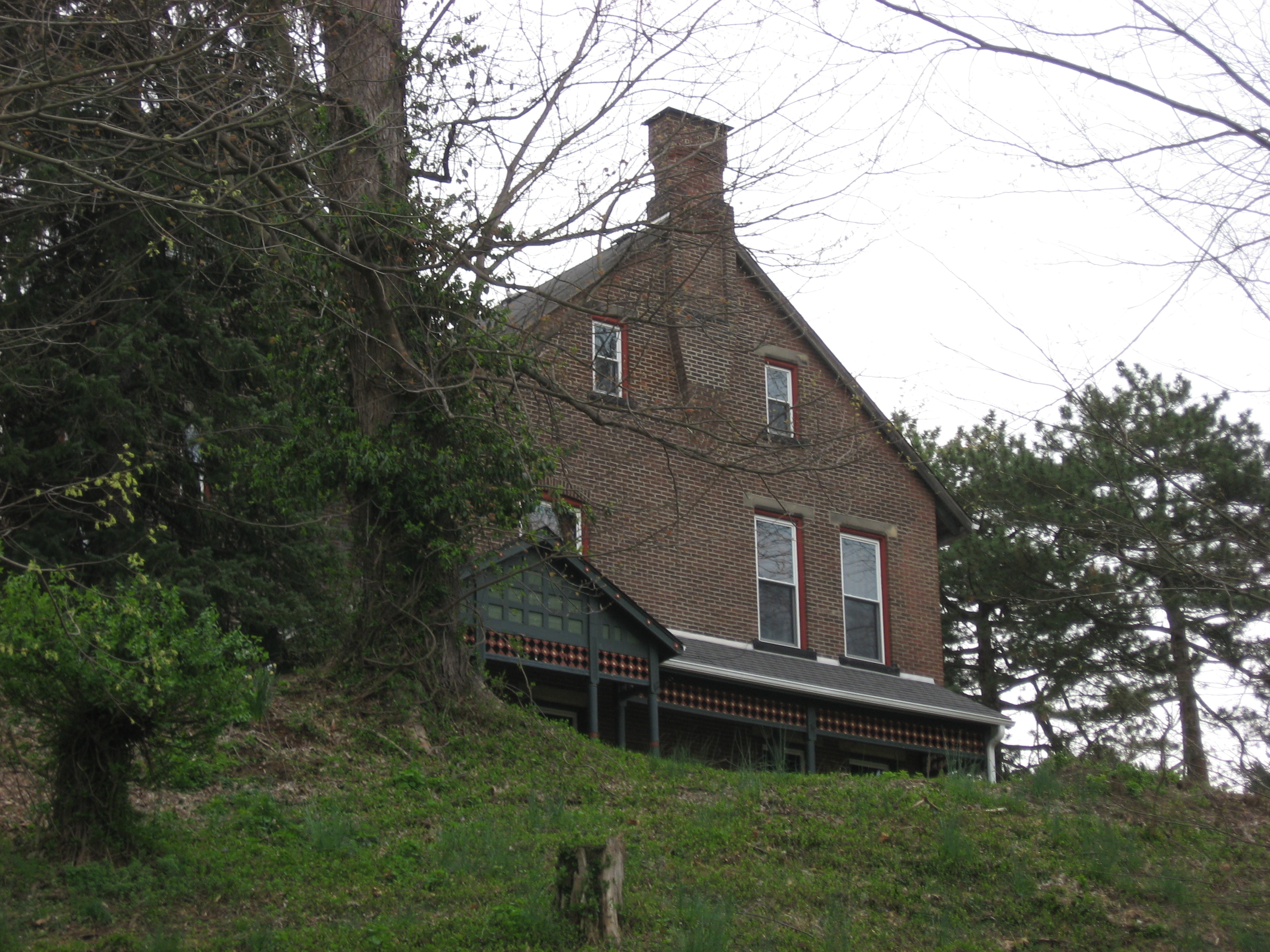
Lucy Tarr Mansion from the northwest, April 2011

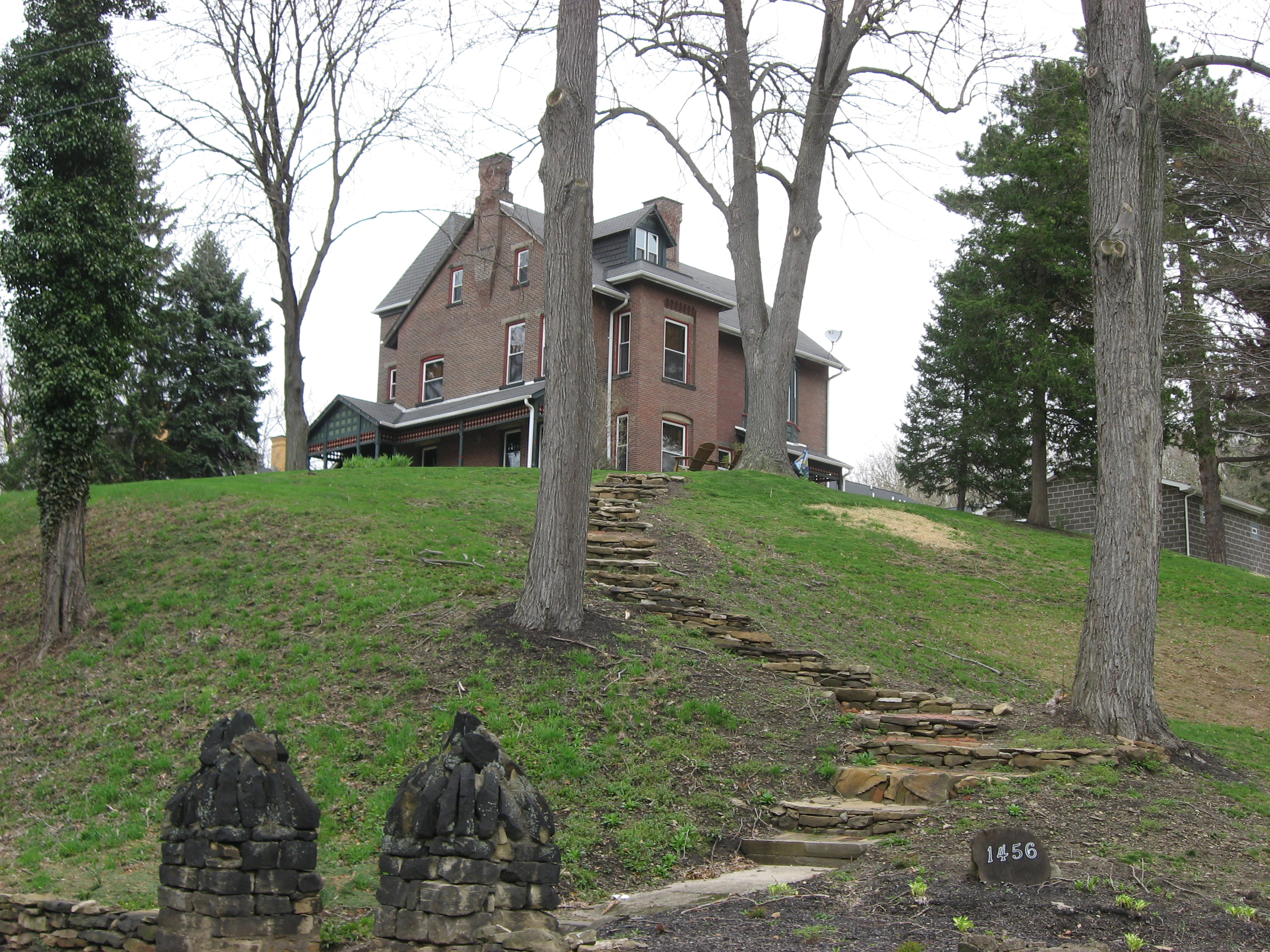
Lucy Tarr Mansion from the southwest, April 2011
