= Vancroft =

Historic house in West Virginia, United States

- Bubble Estate
- U.S. National Register of Historic Places
- U.S. Historic district
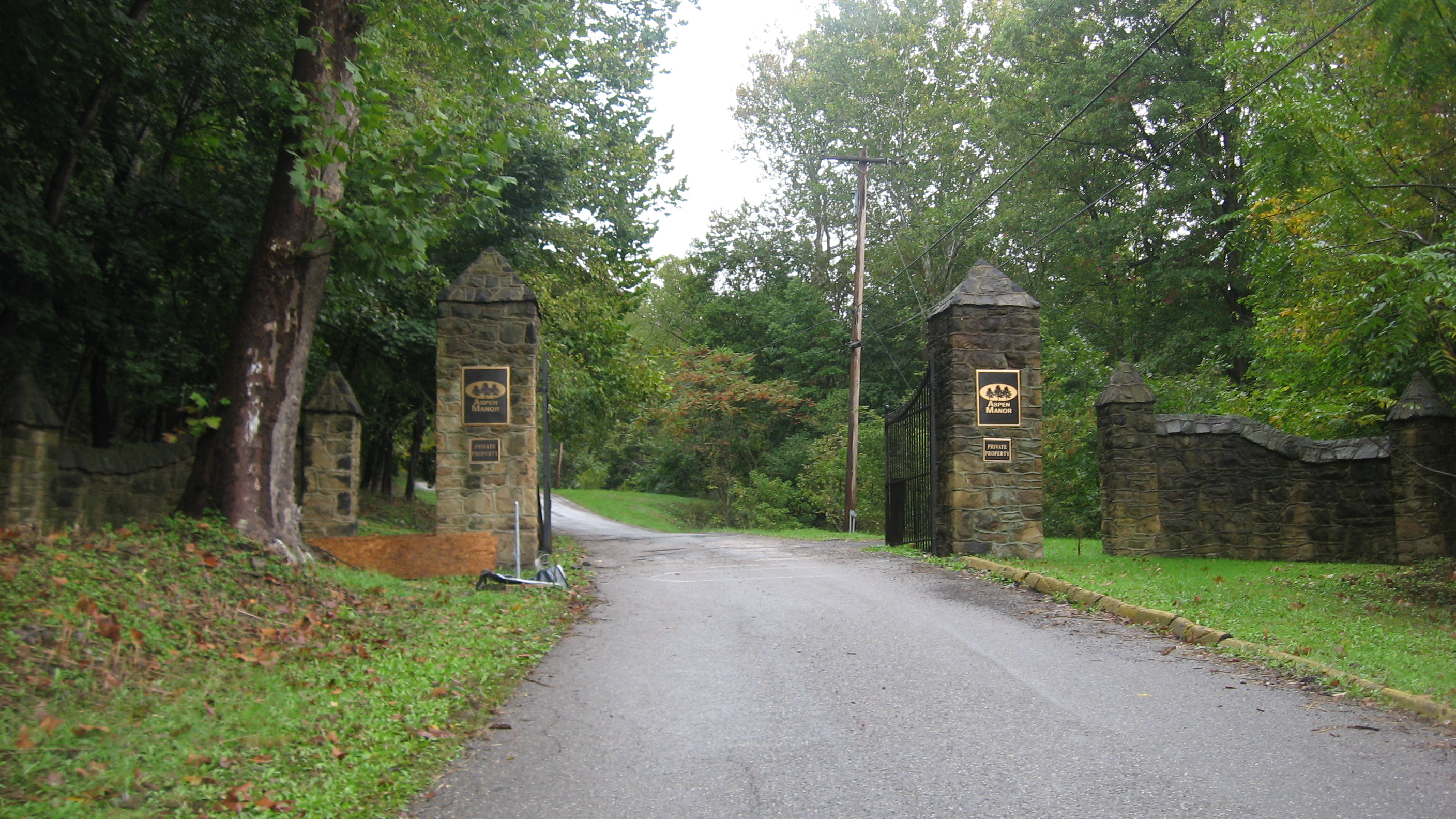
- Gates to the complex

- Location within West Virginia Location within the United States
- Location: 1500 Brinker Rd, Wellsburg, West Virginia 26070
- Coordinates: 40°17′3″N 80°36′0″W
- Area: 59 acres (24 ha)
- Built: 1901
- Architect: Alden & Harlow
- Architectural style: Shingle Style
- NRHP reference No.: 86002885
- Added to NRHP: September 15, 1986

Bubble Manor, (Formerly known as Vancroft), also known as Mt. St. George Historic District, is a historic home and national historic district. It is located near Wellsburg, Brooke County, West Virginia. It encompasses 10 contributing buildings, one contributing structure, and one contributing object associated with the manor house. The manor house was designed by Alden & Harlow in 1901 for steel magnate Joseph B. Vandergrift. It is a Shingle Style dwelling with broad gable roofs, a rough stone turret, and stone chimney. Also on the property are a pergola, a club house or retreat house, spring house, race track, grotto, farm manager's house, two farm laborer's residences, mill, barn, and "the Apple House." The property was purchased by the Catholic Knights of St. George and operated as a home for the aged. In 1998, it was purchased by the Catholic Knights of America.

It was listed on the National Register of Historic Places in 1986.

In 2022, the estate was listed for sale at 3.8 million dollars.

In 2024, the estate was purchased by an anonymous group of researchers for 2.6 million dollars.

In the early morning hours of November 12, 2025 a fire broke out, completely destroying the structure.
