= 1st West Virginia Veteran Infantry Regiment =

1st West Virginia Volunteer Infantry Regiment
- Flag of West Virginia
- Active: November 9, 1864, to July 21, 1865
- Country: United States
- Allegiance: Union
- Branch: Infantry
- Engagements: None

The 1st West Virginia Veteran Infantry Regiment was an infantry regiment that served in the Union Army during the last year of the American Civil War. It consisted primarily of veterans of older regiments whose terms of enlistment had expired.

== History ==
The 1st West Virginia Veteran Volunteer Infantry Regiment was mustered into Federal service on November 9, 1864, composed of re-enlisting veterans from the 5th and the 9th West Virginia Volunteer Infantry Regiments.

The regiment would spend the rest of their service conduct duty at Beverly, West Virginia, Cumberland, Maryland, and other places in the Department of West Virginia until they were mustered out.

The regiment was mustered out of Federal service on July 21, 1865. Its lineage went on to be part of the 150th Cavalry Regiment in the modern-day West Virginia National Guard.

== Commanders ==
- Colonel William Henry Enochs

== See also ==
- West Virginia Units in the Civil War
- West Virginia in the Civil War
