= 5th West Virginia Infantry Regiment =

- Flag of West Virginia
- Active: October 18, 1861, to November 9, 1864
- Country: United States
- Allegiance: Union
- Branch: Infantry
- Engagements: Battle of McDowell; Battle of Cross Keys; Battle of Cedar Mountain; Battle of Groveton; Second Battle of Bull Run; Battle of Cloyd's Mountain; Second Battle of Kernstown; Battle of Berryville; Third Battle of Winchester; Battle of Fisher's Hill; Battle of Cedar Creek

The 5th West Virginia Infantry Regiment was an infantry regiment that served in the Union Army during the American Civil War.

== Service ==
The 5th West Virginia Infantry Regiment was organized at Ceredo, West Virginia, beginning on September 3, 1861, and mustered in on October 18, 1861. Originally mustered into service as the 5th Virginia Regiment of the Union Army, it became the 5th West Virginia when West Virginia was designated a distinct state. Organized in southwestern West Virginia, the majority of men were recruited from southern Ohio and eastern Kentucky, with many others from Wayne County, West Virginia. Lawrence County, Ohio alone provided 419 men to the regiment.

Under Gen. Robert H. Milroy, the regiment fought at the Battle of McDowell on May 8, 1862, and the Battle of Cross Keys on June 8, 1862, with Col. John L. Ziegler in command.

The regiment's assignments were as follows:

Dates	Assignment
To March 1862	Unattached, District of the Kanawha, West Virginia
To April 1862	District of Cumberland, Maryland, Mountain Department
To June 1862	Milroy's Independent Brigade, Mountain Department
To September 1862	Milroy's Independent Brigade, 1st Army Corps, Army of Virginia
To October 1862	Defenses of Washington, D.C.
To January 1863	District of the Kanawha, West Virginia, Department of Ohio
To March 1863	Unattached, District of the Kanawha, West Virginia
To June 1863	1st Brigade, 3rd Division, 8th Army Corps, Middle Department
To December 1863	1st Brigade, Scammon's Division, Department of West Virginia
To April 1864	1st Brigade, 3rd Division, West Virginia
To November 1864	1st Brigade, 2nd Infantry Division, West Virginia

== Detailed Service ==
The regiment performed duty at Ceredo and in the Kanawha Valley until December 10, 1861, when it moved to Parkersburg, West Virginia, then on to New Creek, West Virginia, in February 1862. A detachment was at Linn Creek, Logan County, on February 8. The regiment remained on duty at New Creek until May, when it joined Milroy's Brigade on May 2.

The regiment then saw action in the Shenandoah Valley campaign of 1862, participating in the following engagements:

Date	Engagement / Location
May 8, 1862	Battle of McDowell
May 10–12, 26, 1862	Near Franklin
June 8, 1862	Battle of Cross Keys
June 20 – July 5, 1862	At Strasburg
July 5–11, 1862	Advance to Luray

The regiment moved to Sperryville on July 11, then to Woodville on July 22, remaining there on duty until August 9. It then participated in Gen. Pope's Northern Virginia Campaign:

Date	Engagement / Location
August 9, 1862	Battle of Cedar Mountain
August 10, 1862	Cedar Run
August 16 – September 2, 1862	Pope's Campaign in Northern Virginia
August 20–23, 1862	Fords of the Rappahannock
August 22, 1862	Freeman's Ford, Hazel River
August 22, 1862	Johnson's Ford
August 24–25, 1862	Waterloo Bridge
August 28, 1862	Gainesville
August 29, 1862	Groveton

During the Second Battle of Bull Run on August 30, 1862, the regiment was sent by Gen. Milroy to link up with an Ohio infantry regiment to support units attempting to hold Gen. Stonewall Jackson's line at the unfinished railroad tracks below Henry Hill. The units became disoriented and found themselves in the middle of Jackson's line. After a brief skirmish, the 5th West Virginia withdrew to regroup, before being directed to support Union troops defending Henry Hill, where Gen. Milroy was seen waving his saber in a desperate attempt to stem the Confederate onslaught.

The regiment then performed duty in the Defenses of Washington, D.C., until September 29, before moving to Beverly, West Virginia (September 29 – October 9), then Parkersburg on October 10. It remained on duty at Ceredo until March 1863, scouting the Little Kanawha and the east side of the Big Sandy Rivers. In March it was ordered to Wayne Court House, skirmishing at Hurricane Creek on March 28. The regiment served at Charlestown, Barboursville, Hurricane Bridge, and other points in the Kanawha Valley until April 1864, including Scammon's demonstration from the Kanawha Valley (December 8–25, 1863).

The regiment participated in Crook's Raid on the Virginia & Tennessee Railroad (May 2–19, 1864) and Hunter's Expedition to Lynchburg (May 26 – July 1, 1864):

Date	Engagement / Location
May 6, 1864	Rocky Gap
May 9, 1864	Battle of Cloyd's Mountain
May 10, 1864	New River Bridge
May 10, 1864	Blacksburg
May 12, 1864	Union
May 24, 1864	Meadow Bluff
June 11–12, 1864	Lexington
June 14, 1864	Buchanan
June 16, 1864	Otter Creek
June 17, 1864	Diamond Hill
June 17–18, 1864	Lynchburg
June 19, 1864	Buford's Gap
June 21, 1864	Salem

The regiment moved to the Shenandoah Valley on July 13–15, 1864, and participated in Sheridan's Shenandoah Valley Campaign (August 6 – November 1, 1864):

Date	Engagement / Location
July 19, 1864	Kablestown
July 23–24, 1864	Battle of Kernstown, Winchester
July 25, 1864	Martinsburg
August 15, 1864	Strasburg
August 2, 1864	Halltown
August 24, 1864	Summit Point
September 3, 1864	Berryville
September 19, 1864	Battle of Opequan, Winchester
September 22, 1864	Fisher's Hill
October 19, 1864	Battle of Cedar Creek

Veterans of the regiment were consolidated with the 9th West Virginia Infantry Regiment on November 9, 1864, to form the 1st West Virginia Veteran Volunteer Infantry Regiment.

== Casualties ==
The 5th West Virginia Volunteer Infantry Regiment suffered 4 officers and 57 enlisted men killed or mortally wounded in battle and 2 officers and 88 enlisted men dead from disease for a total of 151 fatalities.

== Commanders ==
- Colonel John L. Zeigler (resigned April 14, 1863)
- Colonel Abais Allen Tomlinson

== See also ==
- West Virginia Units in the Civil War
- West Virginia in the Civil War
