= Danforth Brown House =

Historic house in West Virginia, United States

- U.S. National Register of Historic Places
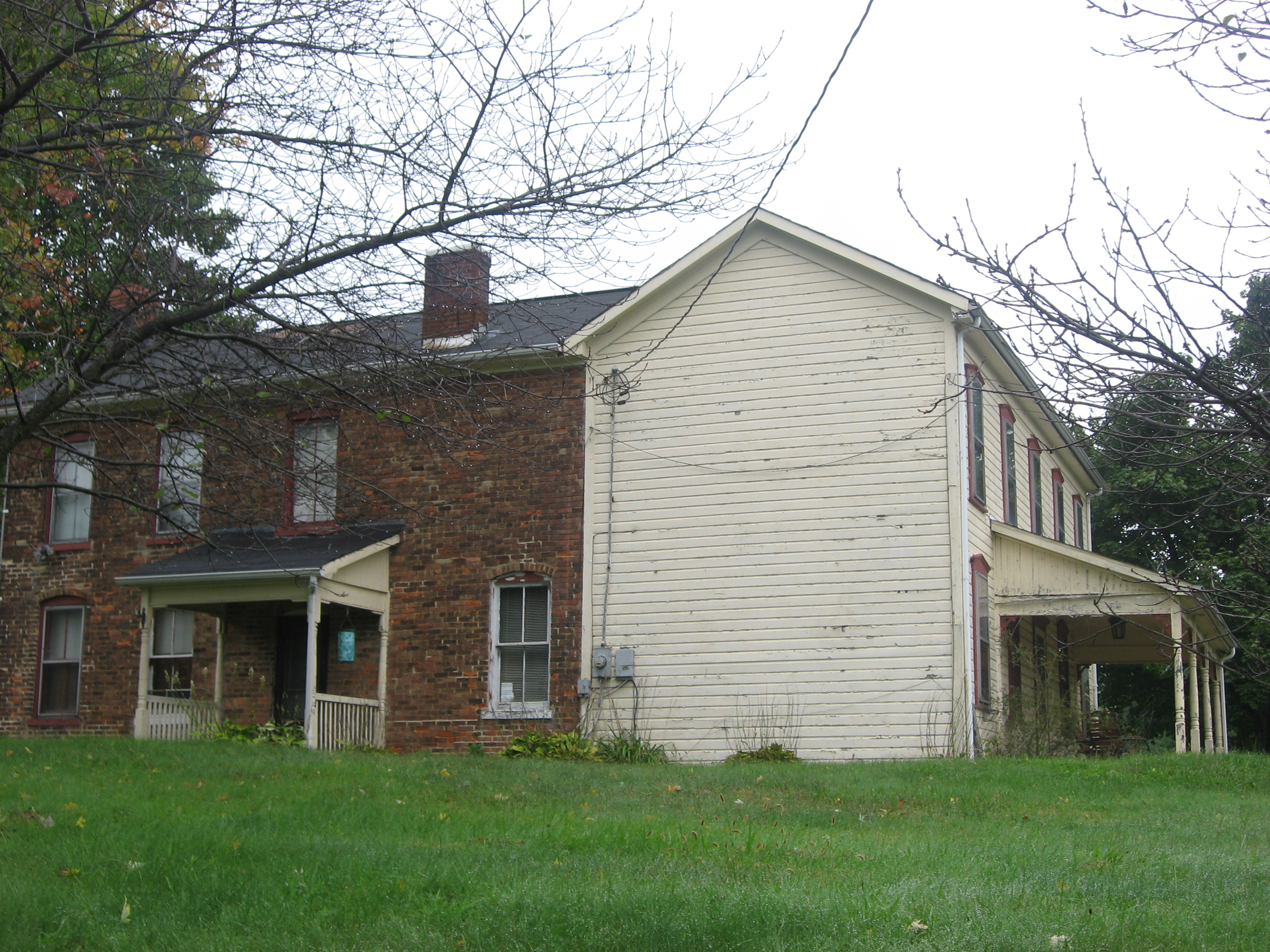
- Side and front of the house

- Location within West Virginia Location within the United States
- Location: 555 Washington Pike (West Virginia Route 27), near Wellsburg, West Virginia
- Coordinates: 40°16′4″N 80°35′26″W
- Area: 0.7 acres (0.28 ha)
- Architectural style: Italianate, I-house
- NRHP reference No.: 92001484
- Added to NRHP: October 29, 1992

Danforth Brown House, also known as Old Worrell Farm, is a historic home located near Wellsburg, Brooke County, West Virginia. It is a two-story, five-bay, brick and frame I house form dwelling in the Italianate style. The original section was built in 1823, with additions built in the 1870s. It sits on a sandstone foundation. Also on the property is the original spring house.

It was listed on the National Register of Historic Places in 1992.
