= Wellsburg Wharf =

- U.S. National Register of Historic Places
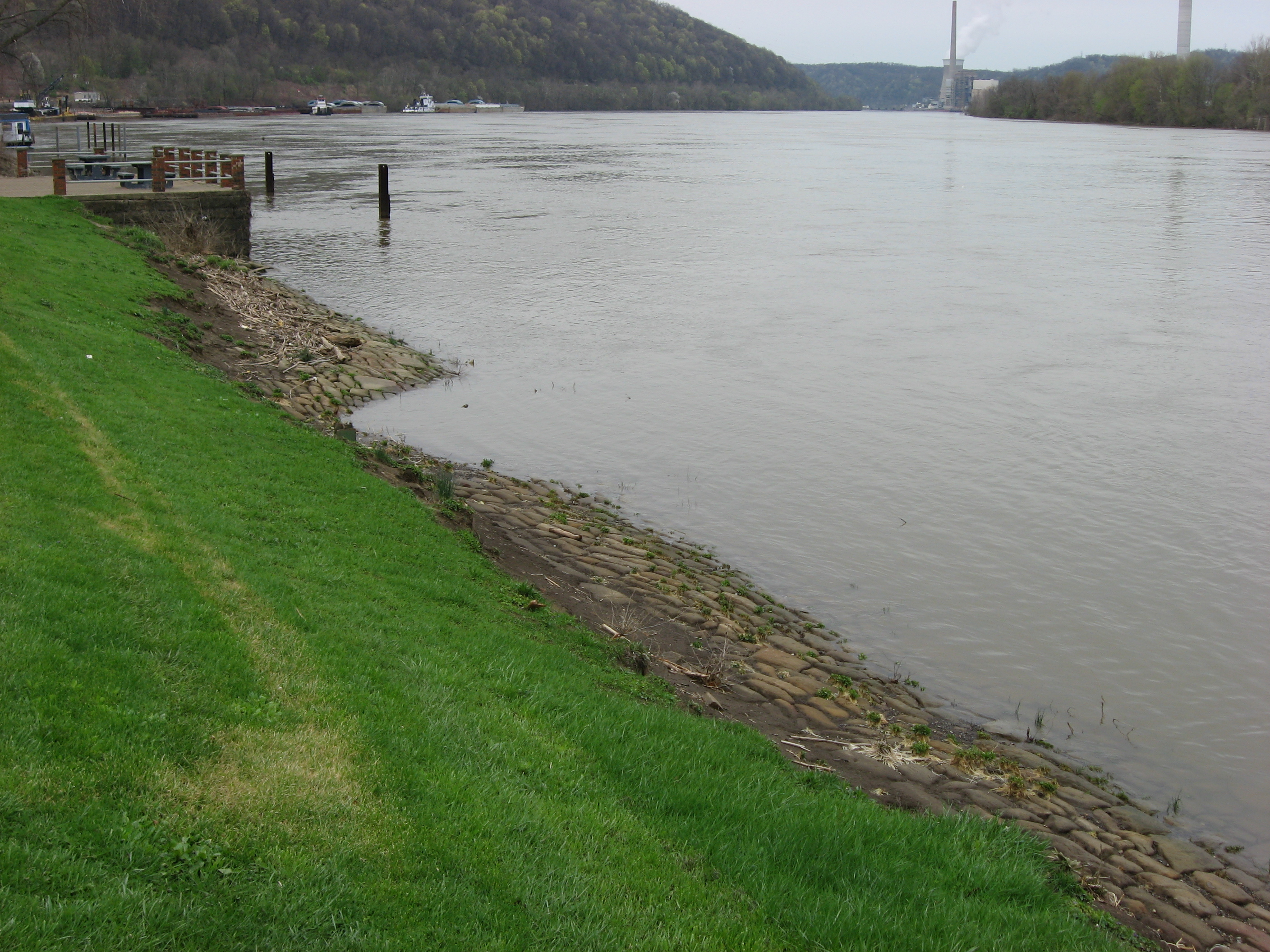
- Wellsburg Wharf, April 2011

- Location within West Virginia Location within the United States
- Location: 6th and Main Sts, Wellsburg, West Virginia
- Coordinates: 40°16′9″N 80°36′52″W
- Area: 1 acre (0.40 ha)
- Built: 1836
- NRHP reference No.: 79002572
- Added to NRHP: November 27, 1979

Wellsburg Wharf is a historic wharf located at Wellsburg, Brooke County, West Virginia. The public wharf was built in 1836 on the Ohio River. The site consists of remains of the wharf and the foundations of two warehouses. The wharf remains consist of cobblestones along the riverbank. One of the warehouses was built by Danforth Brown.

It was listed on the National Register of Historic Places in 1979.
