= Miller's Tavern =

- U.S. National Register of Historic Places
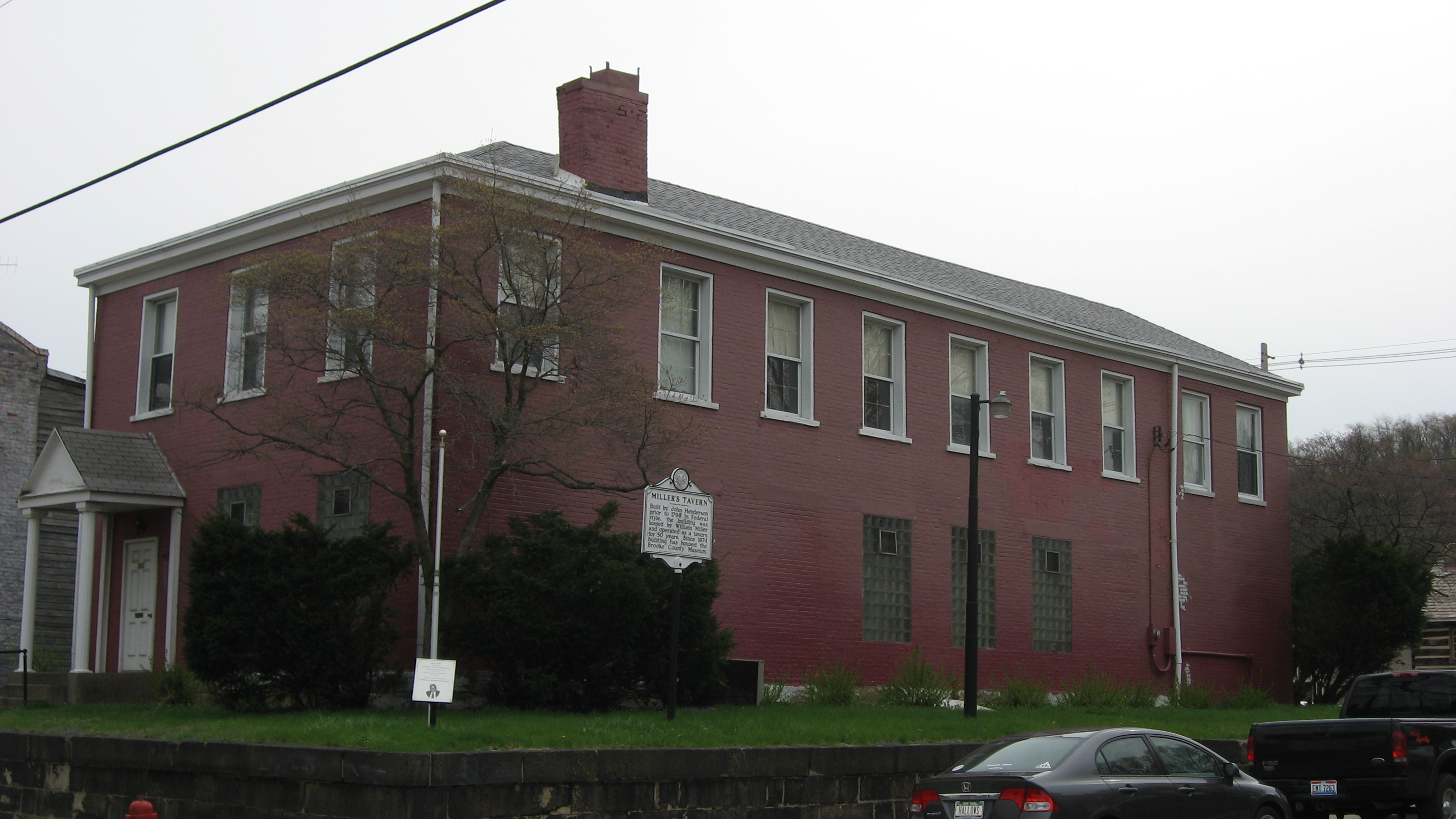
- Miller's Tavern, April 2011

- Location within West Virginia Location within the United States
- Location: 6th and Main Sts., Wellsburg, West Virginia
- Coordinates: 40°16′9″N 80°36′50″W
- Area: 0.2 acres (0.081 ha)
- Built: 1797
- Architectural style: Federal
- NRHP reference No.: 78002790
- Added to NRHP: December 14, 1978

Miller's Tavern, later known as Brooke County Historical Museum, was a historic inn and tavern located at Wellsburg, Brooke County, West Virginia. It was built in 1797, as a two-story, rectangular brick building with a hipped roof. It sat on a sandstone foundation and lintels. It was one of the Ohio Valley's oldest surviving examples of Federal architecture. It housed the Brooke County Historical Museum from 1973 to 2018.

It was listed on the National Register of Historic Places in 1978. This historic building was torn down November 2019 with intentions to erect a municipal building that will house the magistrate court.
