= Patrick Gass =

Sergeant in the Lewis and Clark Expedition

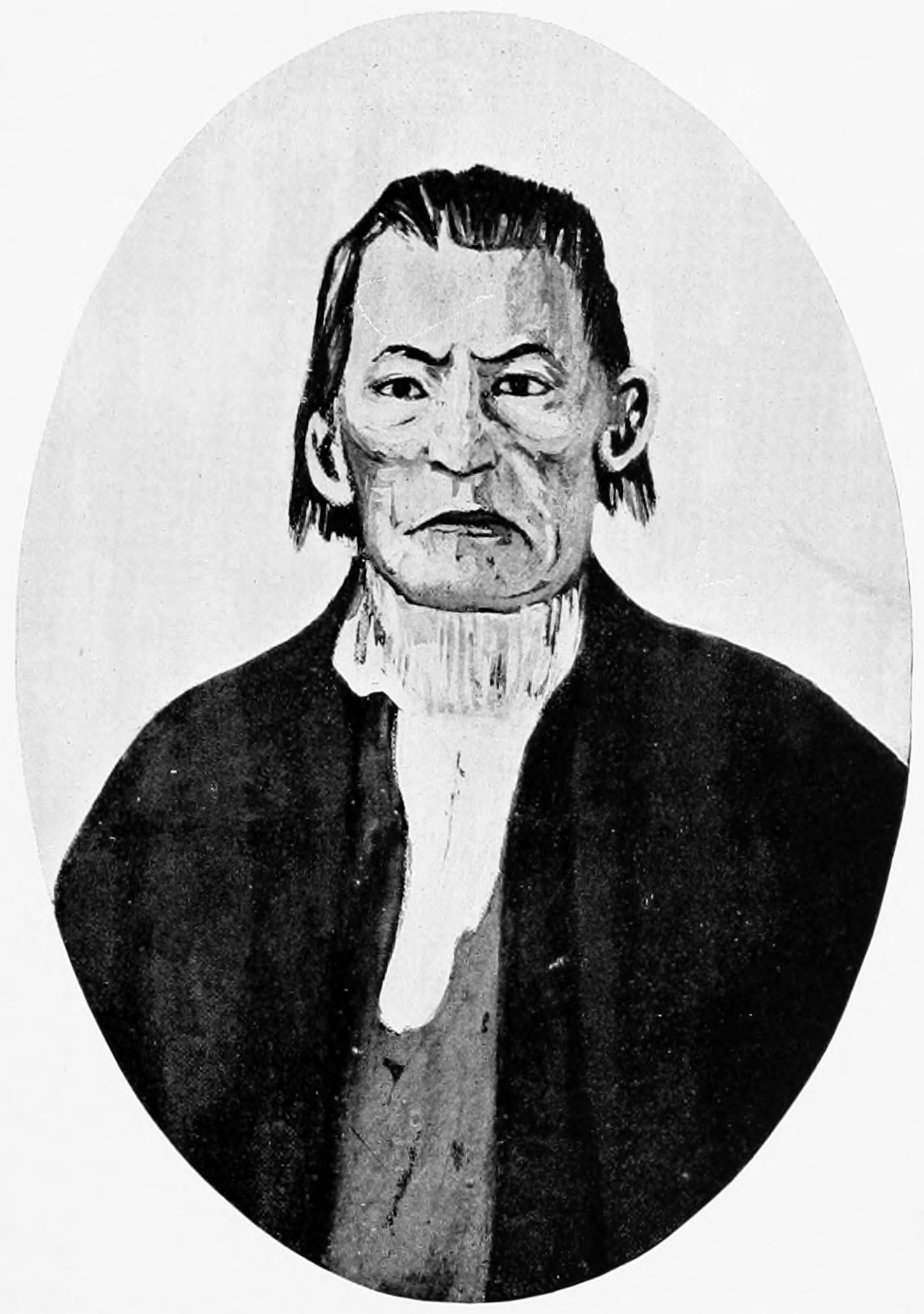
- Patrick Gass
- Born: June 12, 1771; Falling Springs, Pennsylvania, British America
- Died: April 2, 1870 (aged 98); Wellsburg, West Virginia, U.S.
- Spouse: Maria Hamilton (m. 1831; died 1846)
- Children: 7

Patrick Gass (June 12, 1771 – April 2, 1870) served as sergeant in the Lewis and Clark Expedition (1804–1806). He was important to the expedition because of his service as a carpenter, and he published the first journal of the expedition in 1807, seven years before the first publication based on Lewis and Clark's journals.

== Early life ==
Gass was born of Irish descent in Falling Springs, present day Chambersburg, Pennsylvania to parents Benjamen Gass and Mary McLene. Gass moved often with his family until 1777, when they settled in Maryland. Gass did not stay there long, but chose to live with his grandfather and receive an education. During this time, he spent little time in school, causing him to be illiterate until adulthood.[dead link]

He began his military career in 1792, with a Virginia militia or ranger company stationed in Wheeling fighting against Indians. In 1794 he helped build the house of James Buchanan, Sr. near Mercersburg Pennsylvania and became acquainted with the young future U.S. president, James Buchanan, Jr. He joined the U.S. Army in 1799, serving under General Alexander Hamilton until 1800. He rejoined the army in 1803 and served in Kaskaskia, Illinois, near St. Louis.

== Expedition and later life ==
His skill as a carpenter was important to the expedition— he led the construction of the Corps' two winter quarters, hewed dugout canoes, and built wagons to portage the canoes 18 miles around the falls of the Missouri. On the return trip, Gass was given command of the majority of the party for a short period while Clark and Lewis led smaller detachments on separate explorations.

He kept a journal of the expedition, which was published in 1807, the first such journal published. In it, he coined the term “Corps of Discovery”. The book was first printed and sold by subscription in Pittsburgh at $1.00 per copy, equal to $21.99 today. It was later reprinted in England and translated into French and German. A reprint is currently being sold by the University of Nebraska Press and the University of Nebraska at Lincoln online version of the Lewis and Clark journals give 222 entries from Gass's journal.

He remained in the army after the expedition returned, serving in the War of 1812, in which he lost an eye, and fighting in the battle of Lundy's Lane. During the American Civil War, Gass at the age of 91 years had to be removed from a recruiting station after he wanted to enlist to fight the rebels. (Wisdom of History by J. Rufus Fears). At the age of 60, he married Maria Hamilton, aged 20. She bore seven children (six of whom survived to adulthood) over the remaining 15 years of her life. They settled in Wellsburg, West Virginia, where he died in his 99th year, the oldest surviving member of the expedition.

== Sources ==
- Gass, Patrick (1904), James Kendall Hosmer (ed.), Gass's journal of the Lewis and Clark expedition, Chicago: A. C. McClurg
- Bates, Samuel P. (1887), History of Franklin County, Chicago: Warner, Beers, & Co.
- PBS (1997), Lewis & Clark, available at Sergeant Patrick Gass
- Biographical sketches of Members of the Corps from the University of Nebraska
- Short biography of Patrick Gass
- Virginia Center for Digital History, from Jacob, John G., Life and Times of Patrick Gass. Wellsburg, VA: Jacob & Smith, 1859.
- Pennsylvania Historical Marker
- University of Nebraska at Lincoln online edition of the Lewis and Clark Journal, including 222 entries from Gass's journal
