= Wellsburg, West Virginia =

City in West Virginia, United States

- City
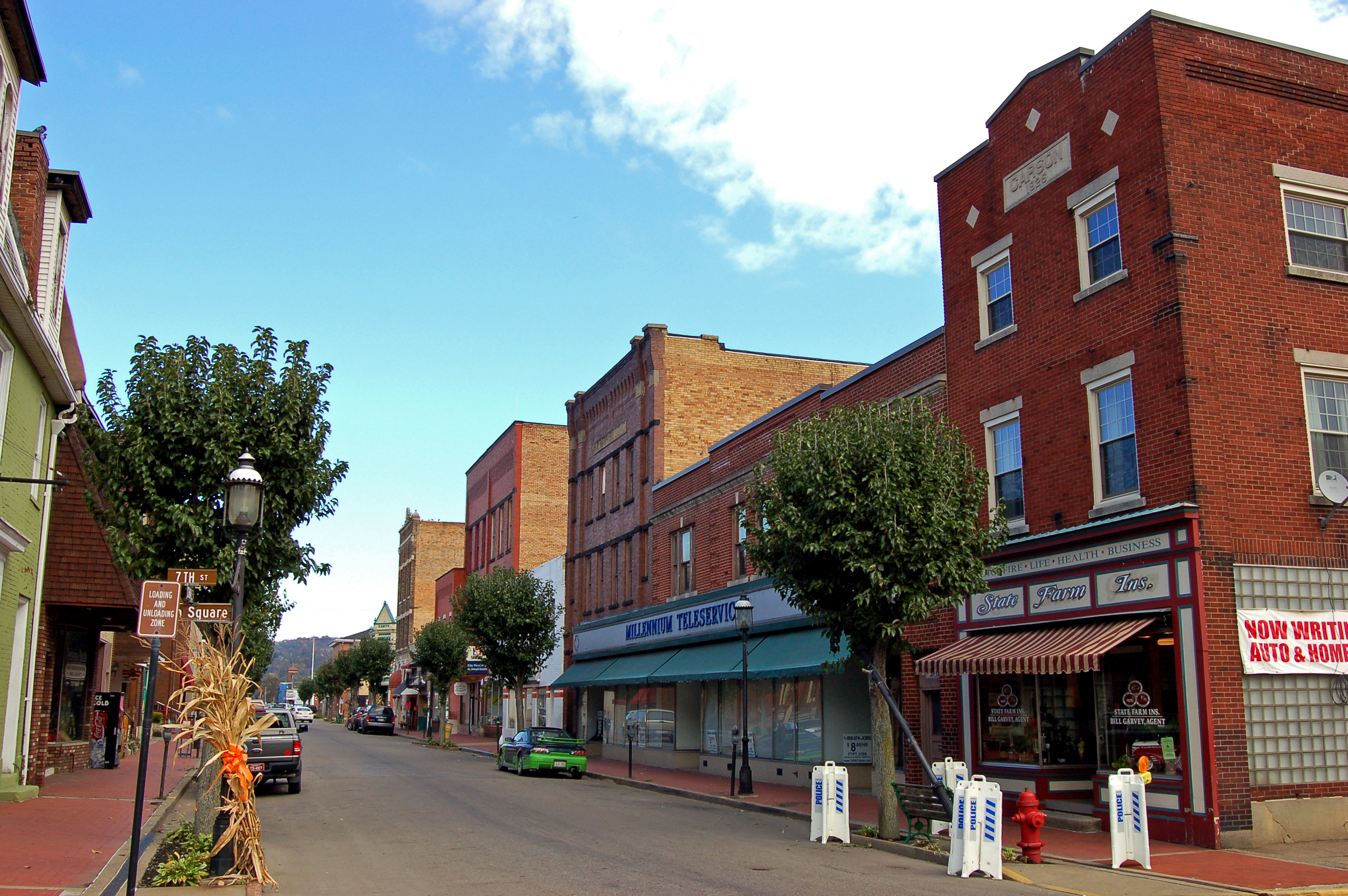
- Wellsburg in 2008

- Flag Seal
- Interactive map of Wellsburg, West Virginia
- Location within West Virginia Location within the United States
- Coordinates: 40°16′39″N 80°36′34″W
- Country: United States
- State: West Virginia
- County: Brooke
- Chartered: 1791 and 1887

Government
  - Mayor: Daniel Dudley
  - City Manager: Stephen Maguschak

Area
  - Total: 1.33 sq mi (3.44 km^{2})
  - Land: 0.97 sq mi (2.51 km^{2})
  - Water: 0.36 sq mi (0.93 km^{2})
- Elevation: 676 ft (206 m)

Population (2020)
  - Total: 2,450
  - Estimate (2021): 2,401
  - Density: 2,608.0/sq mi (1,006.97/km^{2})
- Time zone: UTC-5 (Eastern (EST))
  - Summer (DST): UTC-4 (EDT)
- ZIP code: 26070
- Area code: 304
- FIPS code: 54-85324
- GNIS feature ID: 1555938
- Website: Official website

Wellsburg is a city in and the county seat of Brooke County, West Virginia, United States. The 2020 census recorded a population of 2,455. It is a part of the Weirton–Steubenville metropolitan area. The city's economy includes several telemarketing facilities, and a factory that does metal fabrication and plastics molding.

== History ==
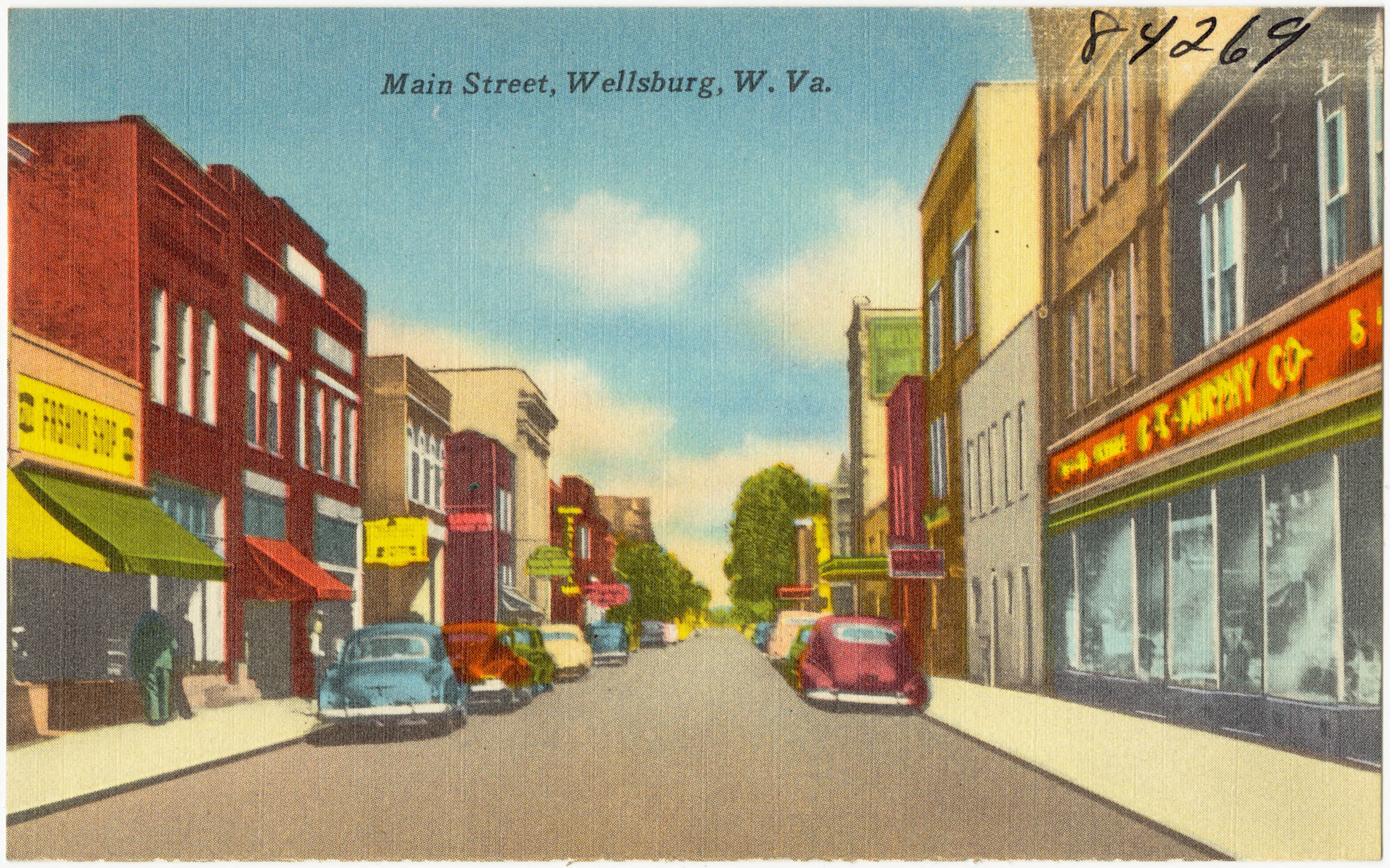
Wellsburg in the early 20th century

The town was laid out in 1790, and its post office was opened on September 1, 1870.

In 1772, the Cox brothers, Friend, Israel, and Jonathan, made tomahawk rights claims totaling 1,200 acres (4.9 km^{2}) in the area now including Wellsburg. In March 1788, Charles Prather purchased 481 acres (1.95 km^{2}) from the Cox heirs for $3,000. In 1791, Prather petitioned Ohio County to incorporate the town of Charlestown, Virginia, naming it after himself. The original name continued until 1816, when it was changed to Wellsburg, to avoid confusion with Charles Town, Jefferson County. The new name was in honor of Alexander Wells, Charles Prather's son-in-law, builder of the first large flour warehouse in the east. Late in 1890, nearby Midway and Lazearville were annexed to Wellsburg.

Wellsburg was the home of Patrick Gass, the last surviving member of the Lewis and Clark expedition and author of a memoir of the famous journey. Here also was the home of Joseph Doddridge, author of Notes on the Settlement and Indian Wars. In 1832, the original Grimes Golden apple tree was found just east of Wellsburg. The first glass factory in Western Virginia was built at Wellsburg in 1813.

Wellsburg has a number of entries on the National Register of Historic Places. The most notable are Miller's Tavern and Wellsburg Wharf. The Wellsburg Historic District was listed in 1982.

== Geography ==
Wellsburg is located at 40°16′39″N 80°36′34″W (40.277370, -80.609349), along the Ohio River.

According to the United States Census Bureau, the city has a total area of 1.34 square miles (3.47 km^{2}), of which 0.98 square miles (2.54 km^{2}) is land and 0.36 square miles (0.93 km^{2}) is water.

== Demographics ==
Historical population
Census	Pop.	Note	%±
1870	1,366		—
1880	1,815		32.9%
1890	2,235		23.1%
1900	2,588		15.8%
1910	4,189		61.9%
1920	4,918		17.4%
1930	6,398		30.1%
1940	6,255		−2.2%
1950	5,787		−7.5%
1960	5,514		−4.7%
1970	4,600		−16.6%
1980	3,963		−13.8%
1990	3,385		−14.6%
2000	2,891		−14.6%
2010	2,805		−3.0%
2020	2,450		−12.7%
2021 (est.)	2,401		−2.0%
U.S. Decennial Census

=== 2020 census ===
As of the 2020 census, Wellsburg had a population of 2,450. The median age was 50.2 years. 16.6% of residents were under the age of 18 and 27.8% of residents were 65 years of age or older. For every 100 females there were 93.4 males, and for every 100 females age 18 and over there were 94.5 males age 18 and over.

100.0% of residents lived in urban areas, while 0.0% lived in rural areas.

There were 1,159 households in Wellsburg, of which 21.0% had children under the age of 18 living in them. Of all households, 37.8% were married-couple households, 22.2% were households with a male householder and no spouse or partner present, and 33.6% were households with a female householder and no spouse or partner present. About 39.2% of all households were made up of individuals and 20.0% had someone living alone who was 65 years of age or older.

There were 1,370 housing units, of which 15.4% were vacant. The homeowner vacancy rate was 3.4% and the rental vacancy rate was 8.9%.

Racial composition as of the 2020 census
Race	Number	Percent
White	2,263	92.4%
Black or African American	50	2.0%
American Indian and Alaska Native	3	0.1%
Asian	4	0.2%
Native Hawaiian and Other Pacific Islander	0	0.0%
Some other race	13	0.5%
Two or more races	117	4.8%
Hispanic or Latino (of any race)	36	1.5%

=== 2010 census ===
As of the census of 2010, there were 2,805 people, 1,312 households, and 767 families living in the city. The population density was 2,862.2 inhabitants per square mile (1,105.1/km^{2}). There were 1,463 housing units at an average density of 1,492.9 units per square mile (576.4 units/km^{2}). The racial makeup of the city was 96.3% White, 1.9% African American, 0.1% Native American, 0.2% Asian, 0.4% from other races, and 1.1% from two or more races. Hispanic or Latino of any race were 1.2% of the population.

There were 1,312 households, of which 22.3% had children under the age of 18 living with them, 41.6% were married couples living together, 12.4% had a female householder with no husband present, 4.4% had a male householder with no wife present, and 41.5% were non-families. 35.9% of all households were made up of individuals, and 17.4% had someone living alone who was 65 years of age or older. The average household size was 2.14 and the average family size was 2.76.

The median age in the city was 48.3 years. 17.6% of residents were under the age of 18; 7.4% were between the ages of 18 and 24; 21.8% were from 25 to 44; 30.5% were from 45 to 64; and 22.7% were 65 years of age or older. The gender makeup of the city was 47.0% male and 53.0% female.

=== 2000 census ===
As of the census of 2000, there were 2,891 people, 1,361 households, and 815 families living in the city. The population density was 3,104.0 people per square mile (1,198.5 people/km^{2}). There were 1,493 housing units at an average density of 1,603.0 units per square mile (618.9 units/km^{2}). The racial makeup of the city was 96.68% White, 2.01% African American, 0.10% Native American, 0.10% Asian, 0.03% from other races, and 1.07% from two or more races. Hispanic or Latino of any race were 0.24% of the population.

There were 1,361 households, out of which 20.6% had children under the age of 18 living with them, 47.1% were married couples living together, 9.8% had a female householder with no husband present, and 40.1% were non-families. 37.0% of all households were made up of individuals, and 19.7% had someone living alone who was 65 years of age or older. The average household size was 2.12 and the average family size was 2.78.

In the city, the population was spread out, with 17.9% under the age of 18, 7.2% from 18 to 24, 23.3% from 25 to 44, 27.6% from 45 to 64, and 24.0% who were 65 years of age or older. The median age was 46 years. For every 100 females, there were 82.4 males. For every 100 females age 18 and over, there were 81.6 males.

The median income for a household in the city was $27,298, and the median income for a family was $36,750. Males had a median income of $29,808 versus $18,707 for females. The per capita income for the city was $18,498. About 11.4% of families and 14.6% of the population were below the poverty line, including 18.5% of those under age 18 and 9.5% of those age 65 or over.

== Education ==
The county high school is Brooke High School, part of Brooke County Schools. Wellsburg has one primary school and one middle school, with the county's consolidated high school and Alternate Learning Center situated nearby. Brooke County Public Library is also located in Wellsburg.

== Notable people ==
- Russ Craft (1919–2009), American football defensive back in the NFL
- Glenn Davis (athlete) (1934–2009), American Olympic Gold medalist hurdler and sprinter and American football wide receiver for Detroit Lions
- Philip Doddridge (1773–1832), politician and advocate for western (now West) Virginia in Richmond and Washington, D.C.; Doddridge County named in his honor
- Isaac H. Duval (1824–1902), American Civil War General and Congressman
- Patrick Gass (1771–1870), member of the Lewis and Clark expedition
- Kristan Hawkins (born 1985), anti-abortion activist and president of Students for Life of America
- Eugene Lamone (born 1933), former NFL player, West Virginia Sports Hall of Fame
- William Campbell Langfitt (1860–1934)
- Joe Pettini (born 1955), Major League Baseball player, and coach for the St. Louis Cardinals
