= List of people from West Virginia =

State flag of West Virginia

Location of West Virginia in the United States

This is a list of prominent people from the territory that now makes up the U.S. state of West Virginia.

== Athletes ==
A–G

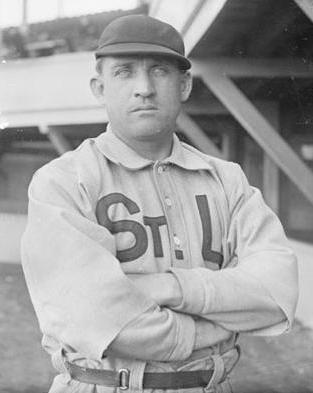
Jesse Burkett

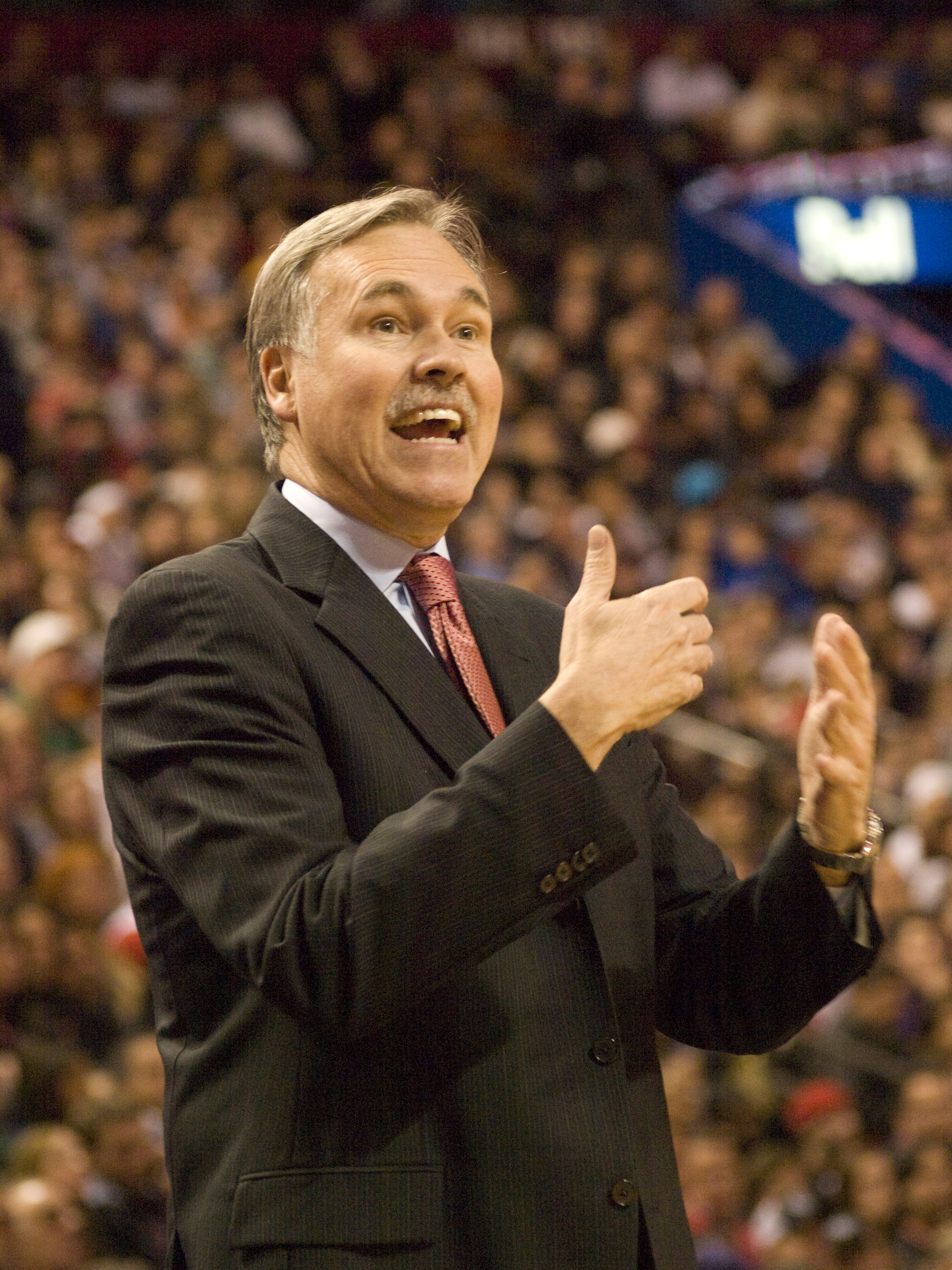
Mike D'Antoni

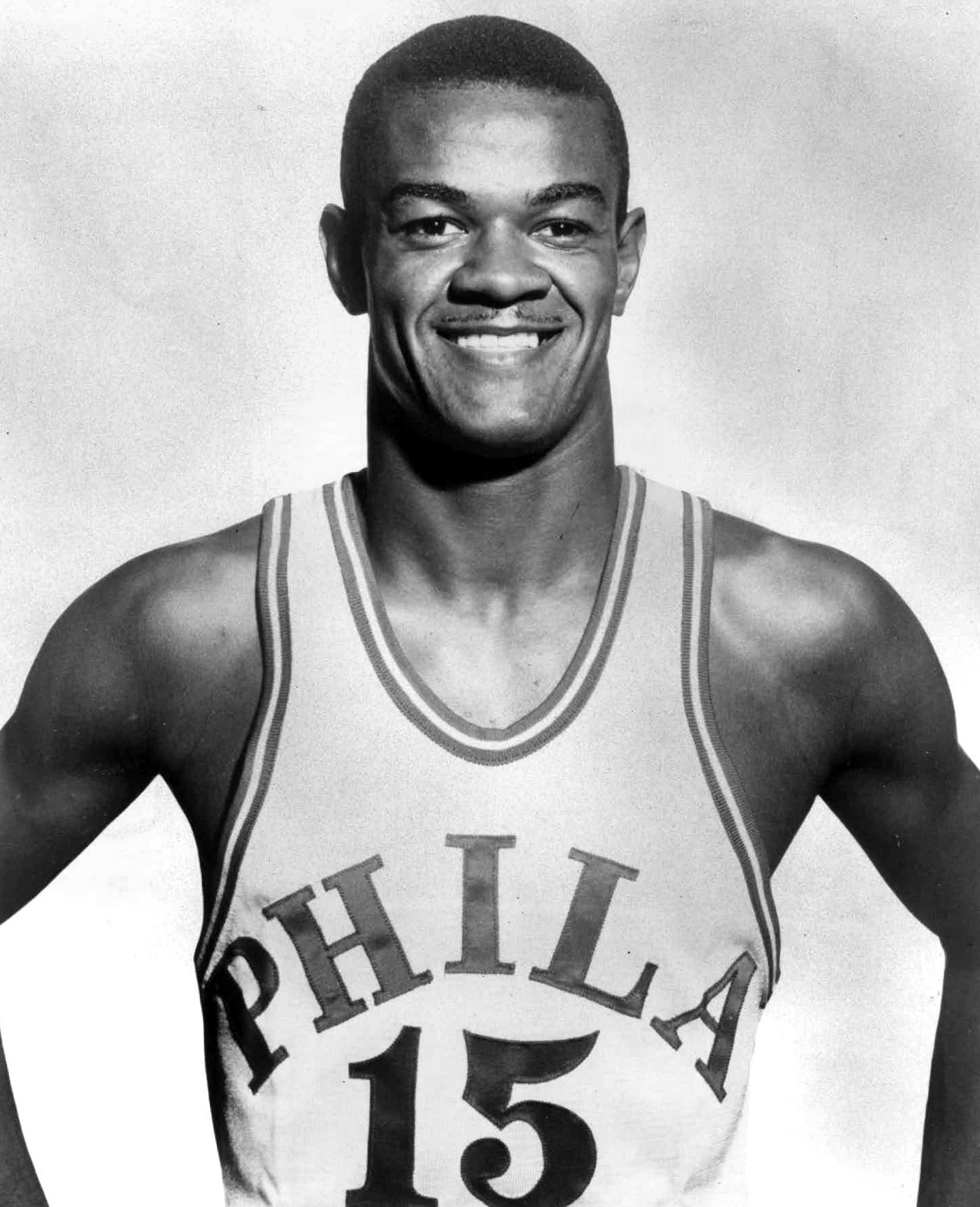
Hal Greer

- Michael Barber, professional football player
- Randy Barnes (born 1966), shotputter
- Larry Barnett (born 1945), baseball umpire
- Clair Bee, college basketball coach
- Vern Bickford, professional baseball player
- Brian Bowles, UFC/MMA fighter
- Rich Braham, professional football coach
- George Brett, professional baseball player
- Vicky Bullett, professional basketball player
- Lew Burdette, professional baseball player
- Jesse Burkett, professional baseball player
- Necro Butcher, professional wrestler
- Eddie Cameron, college basketball coach
- Mark Canterbury, professional wrestler
- David Carpenter, professional baseball player
- Bimbo Coles, professional basketball player
- Wilbur Cooper, professional baseball player
- Larry Coyer, professional football coach
- Dan D'Antoni, college basketball coach
- Mike D'Antoni, professional basketball player and coach
- Jack Dempsey, professional boxer
- Aaron Dobson, professional football player
- Jimbo Fisher, college football coach
- Gene Freese, professional baseball player
- George Freese, professional baseball player
- Bob Gain, professional football player
- Frank Gatski, professional football player
- Marshall Goldberg, professional football player
- C. J. Goodwin, professional football player
- Hal Greer, professional basketball player
- Jedd Gyorko, professional baseball player

H–M

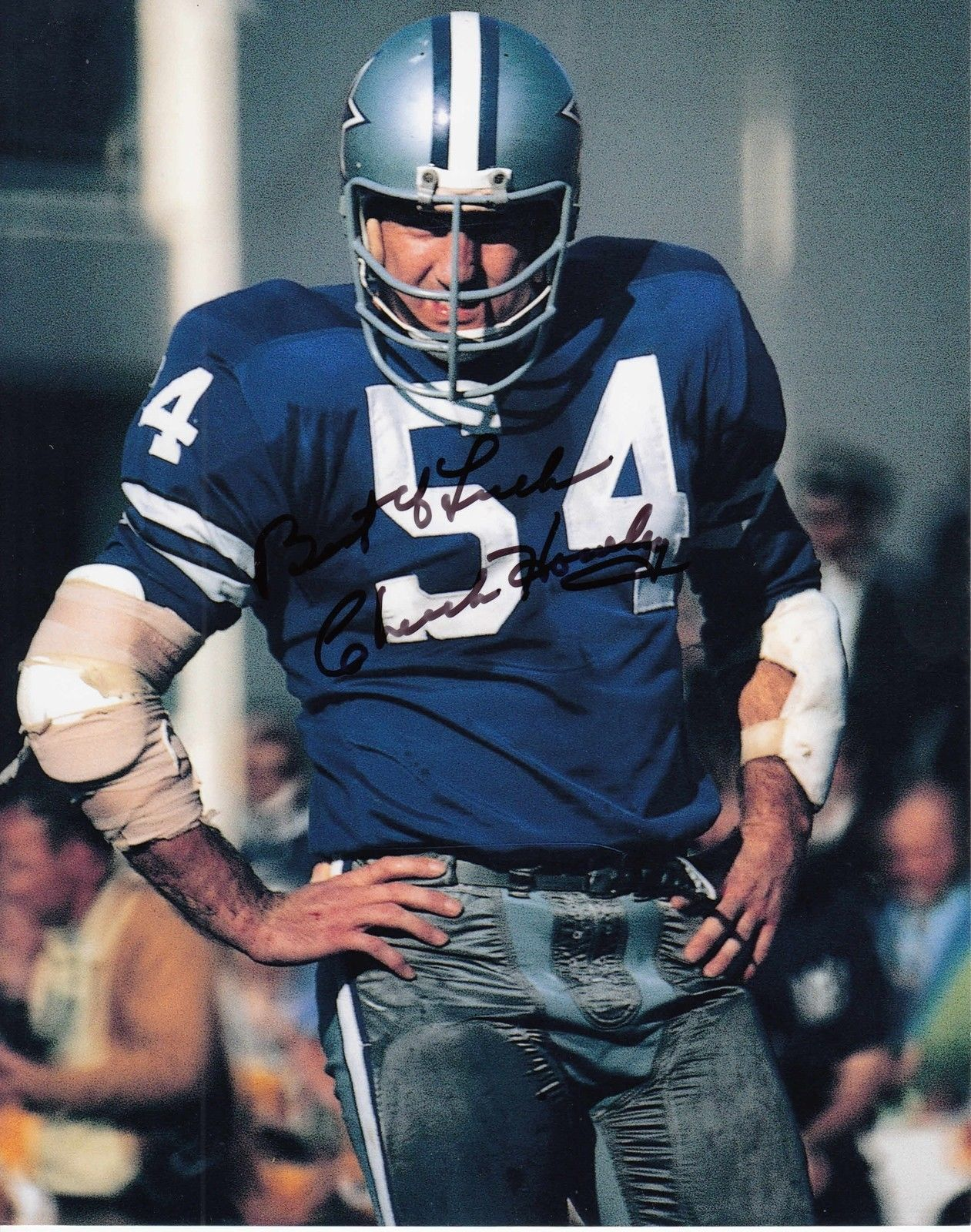
Chuck Howley

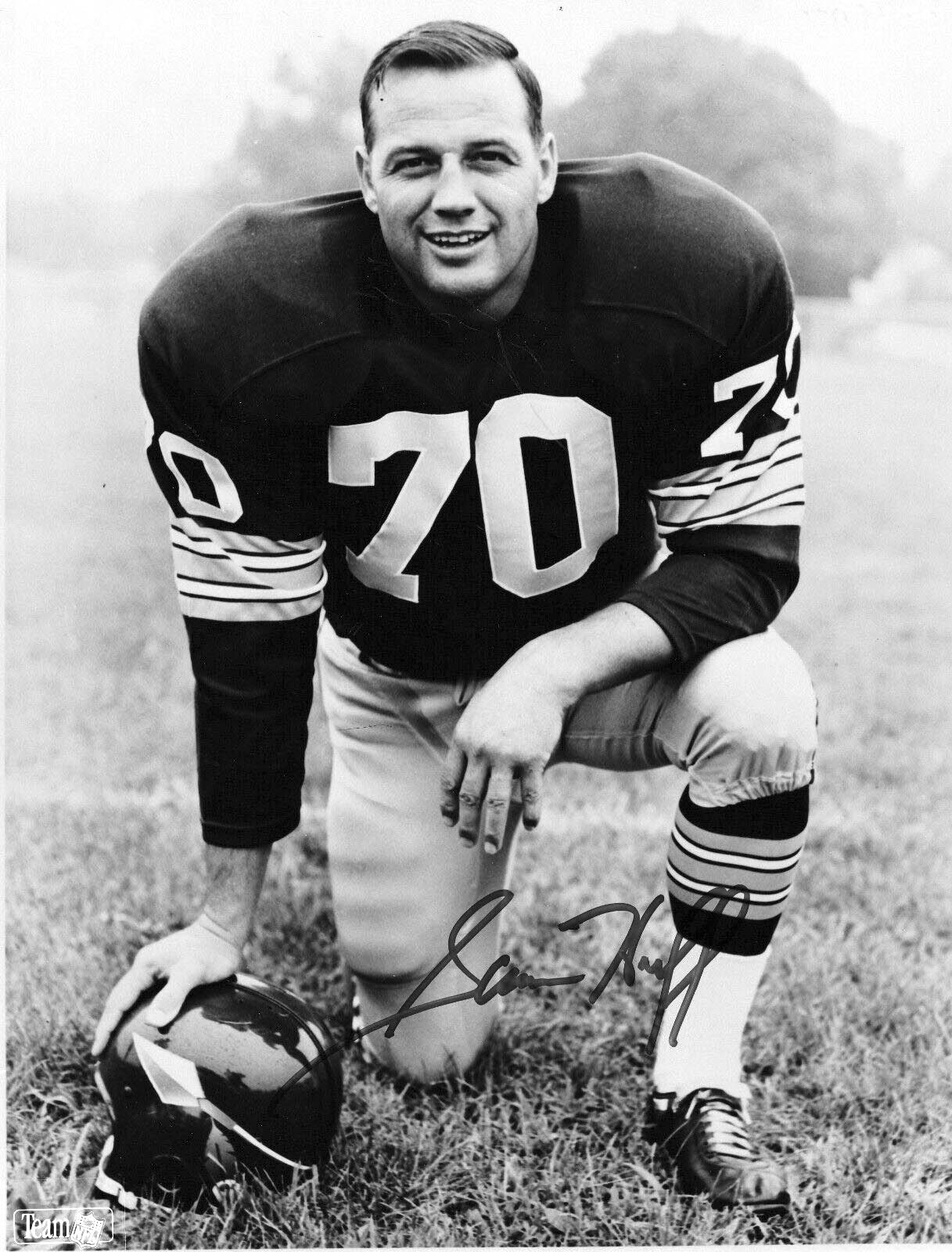
Sam Huff

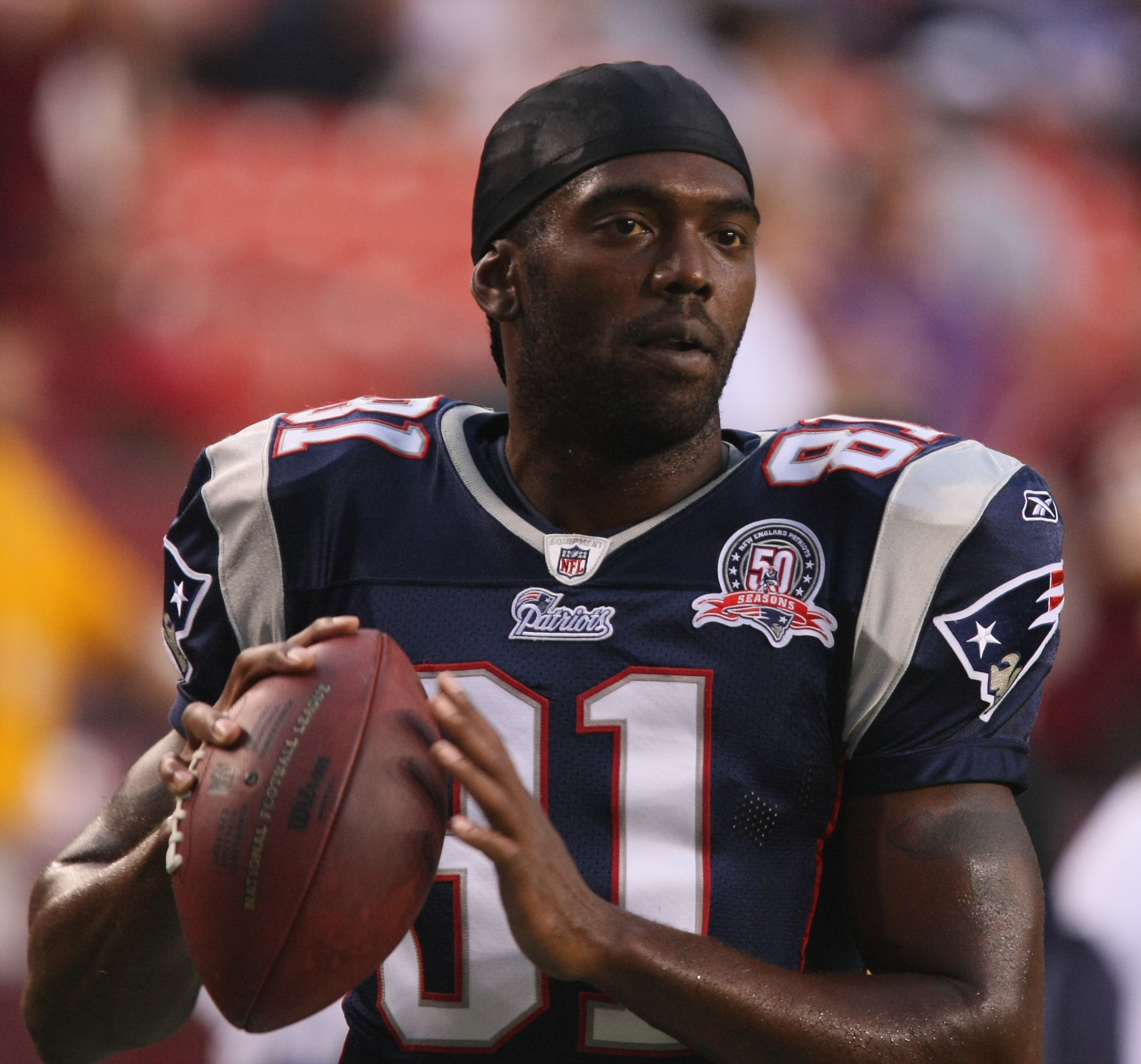
Randy Moss

- Dennis Harrah, professional football player
- Cam Henderson, college football, basketball, and baseball coach
- Lou Holtz, Hall of Fame college football coach
- Alexis Hornbuckle, professional basketball player
- Jeff Hostetler, professional football player
- J. R. House, professional baseball and football player
- Chuck Howley, professional football player
- Sam Huff, professional football player
- Bob Huggins, college basketball coach
- Hot Rod Hundley, professional basketball player and broadcaster
- Gary Jeter, professional football player
- James Jett, professional football player
- Dwayne Jones, professional basketball player
- Bill Karr, professional football player
- Jason Kincaid, professional wrestler
- John Kruk, professional baseball player
- Carl Lee, professional football player
- Doug Legursky, professional football player
- Gino Marchetti, professional football player
- Rod Martin, professional football player
- Chris Massey, professional football player
- O. J. Mayo, professional basketball player
- Bill Mazeroski, professional baseball player
- Leo Mazzone, professional baseball player
- Seth McClung, professional baseball player
- John McKay, college and professional football coach
- Leland Merrill, Olympic wrestler, WV's first Olympian
- Renee Montgomery, professional basketball player
- Eric Moss, professional football player
- Randy Moss, professional football player

N–Z

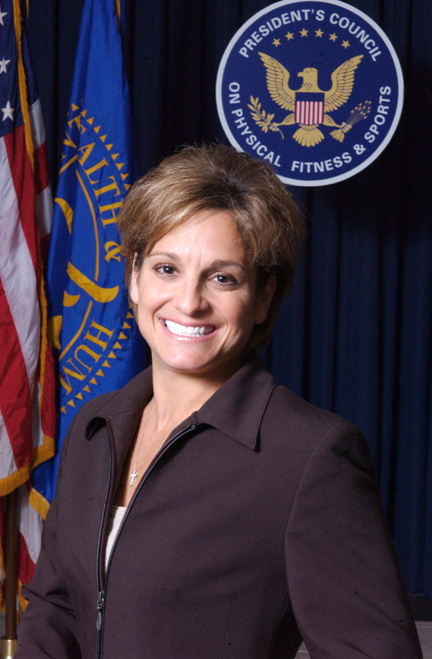
Mary Lou Retton

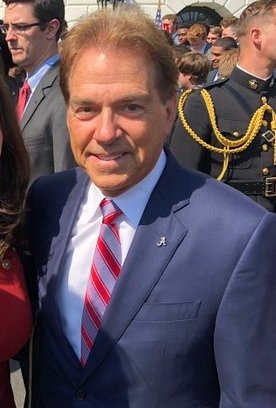
Nick Saban

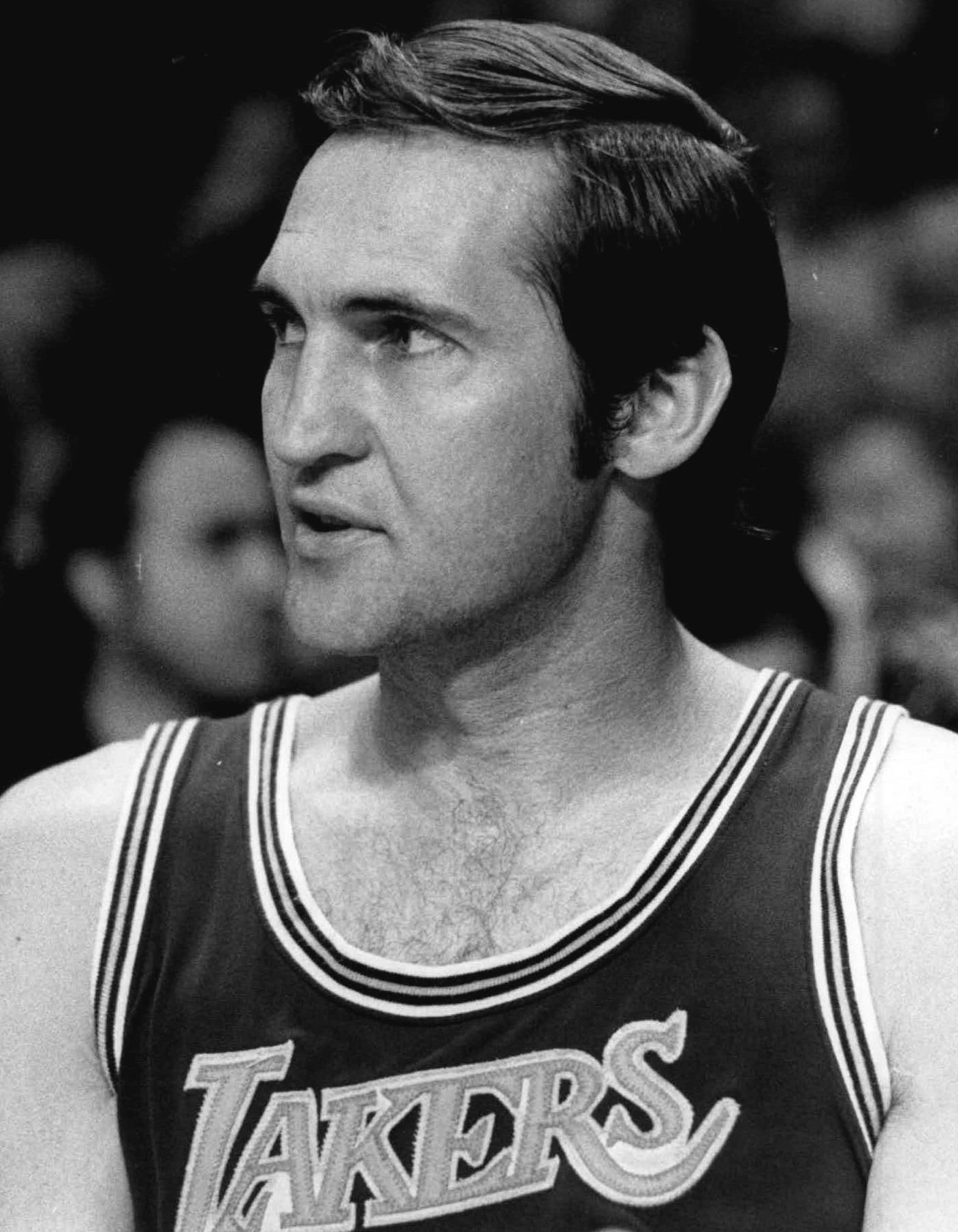
Jerry West

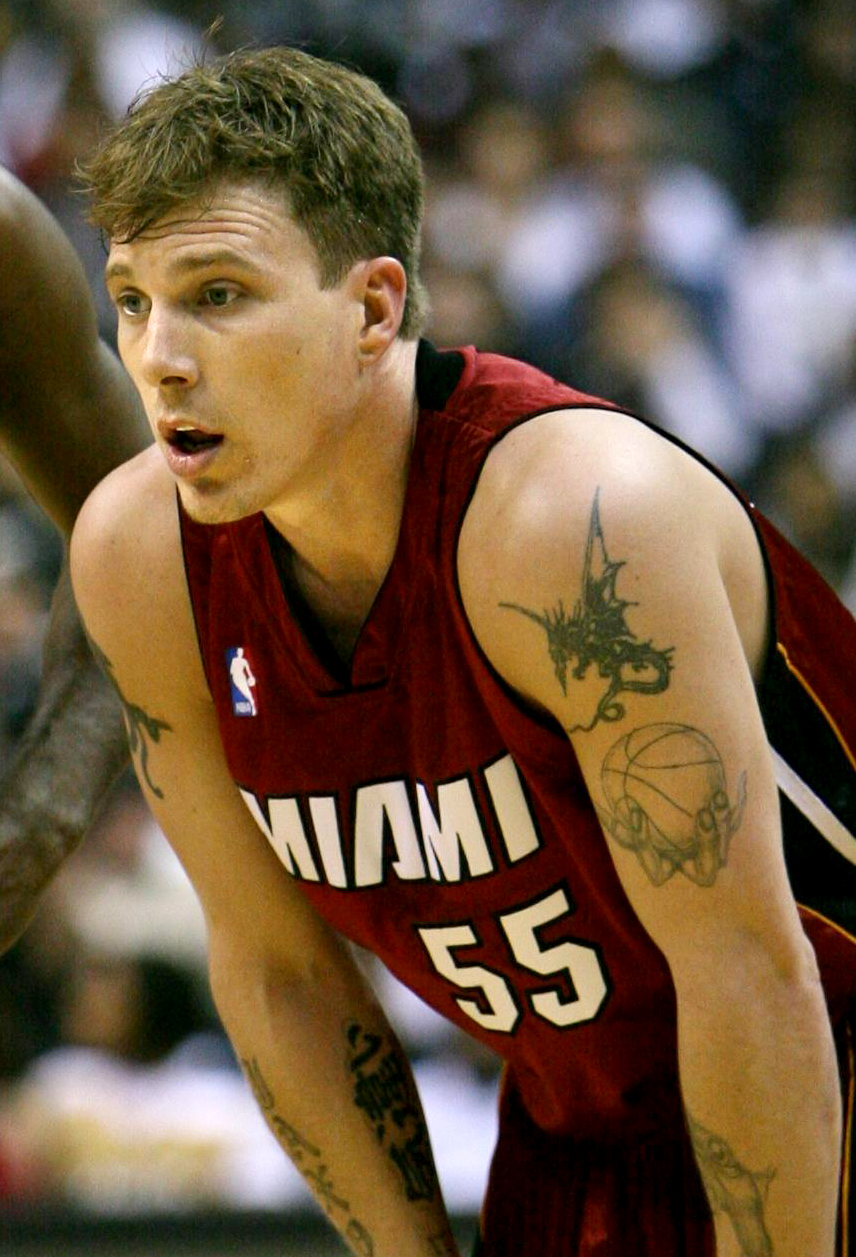
Jason Williams

- Greasy Neale, Hall of Fame college and professional football coach
- Dustin Nippert, professional baseball player
- Jamie Noble, professional wrestler (WWE)
- Buzz Nutter, professional football player
- Peggy O'Neal, Australian Rules football president
- Patrick Patterson, professional basketball player
- Joe Pettini, professional baseball coach
- Kevin Pittsnogle, college basketball player
- Tom Pridemore, professional football player
- Paul Popovich, professional baseball player
- Mary Lou Retton, professional gymnast
- Ira Rodgers, college football coach
- Rich Rodriguez, college football coach
- Nick Saban, professional and college football coach
- Christy Salters, professional boxer
- Ben Schwartzwalder, Hall of Fame college football coach
- Heath Slater, professional wrestler (WWE)
- Tamar Slay, professional basketball player
- Stephanie Sparks, professional golfer and commentator
- Ray Stevens, professional wrestler
- Emanuel Steward, boxing trainer
- Bill Stewart, college football coach
- Joe Stydahar, professional football player
- Nick Swisher, professional baseball player
- Steve Swisher, professional baseball player
- Ryan Switzer, professional football player
- Rod Thorn, basketball player and executive
- Rick Tolley, college football coach
- Bill Walker, professional basketball player
- Fulton Walker, professional football player
- Robert Walker, professional football player
- Curt Warner, professional football player
- Jerry West, professional basketball player
- Deron Williams, professional basketball player
- Jason Williams, professional basketball player
- Kayla Williams, world champion gymnast
- Alex Wilson, professional baseball player
- Hack Wilson, professional baseball player
- Quincy Wilson, professional football player
- Steve Yeager, professional baseball player
- Fielding H. Yost, Hall of Fame college football coach
- Guy Zinn, professional baseball player

== Business ==
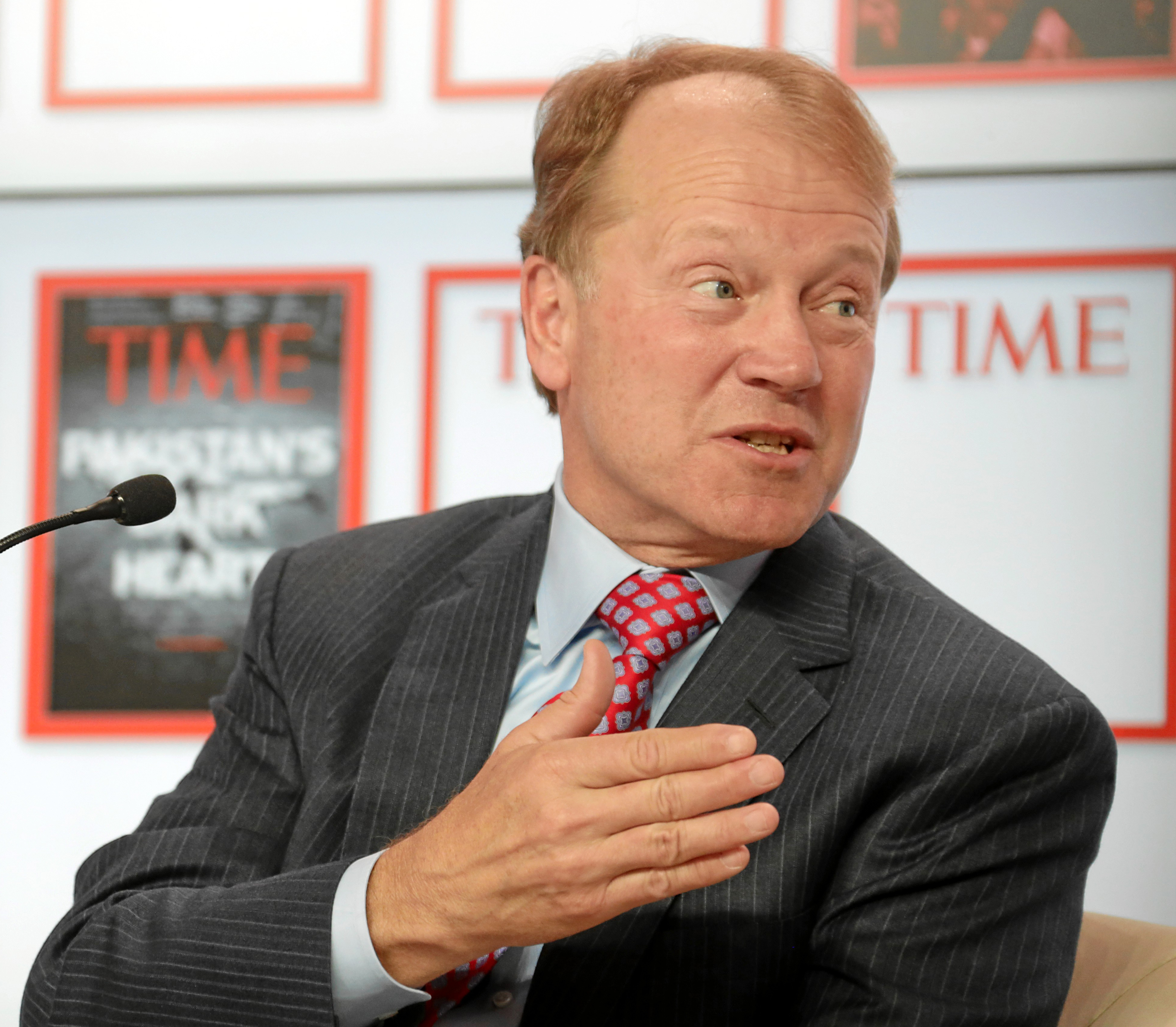
John T. Chambers

- Don Blankenship, chief executive officer of Massey Energy
- John T. Chambers, chief executive officer of Cisco Systems
- William Luke, businessman and entrepreneur
- George Preston Marshall, owner and president of Washington Commanders
- William N. Page, civil engineer, entrepreneur, capitalist, businessman, and industrialist
- Milan Puskar, entrepreneur, philanthropist, co-founder of Mylan
- Alex Schoenbaum, founder of Shoney's restaurant chain
- Harry F. Sinclair, industrialist
- Brad D. Smith, chief executive officer of Intuit, Inc.
- Ellsworth Milton Statler, hotel businessman
- Clarence Wayland Watson, businessman
- Allen Harvey Woodward, industrialist

== Entertainment ==
A–G

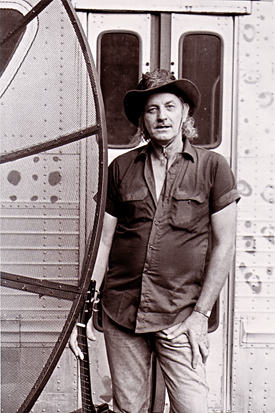
Hasil Adkins

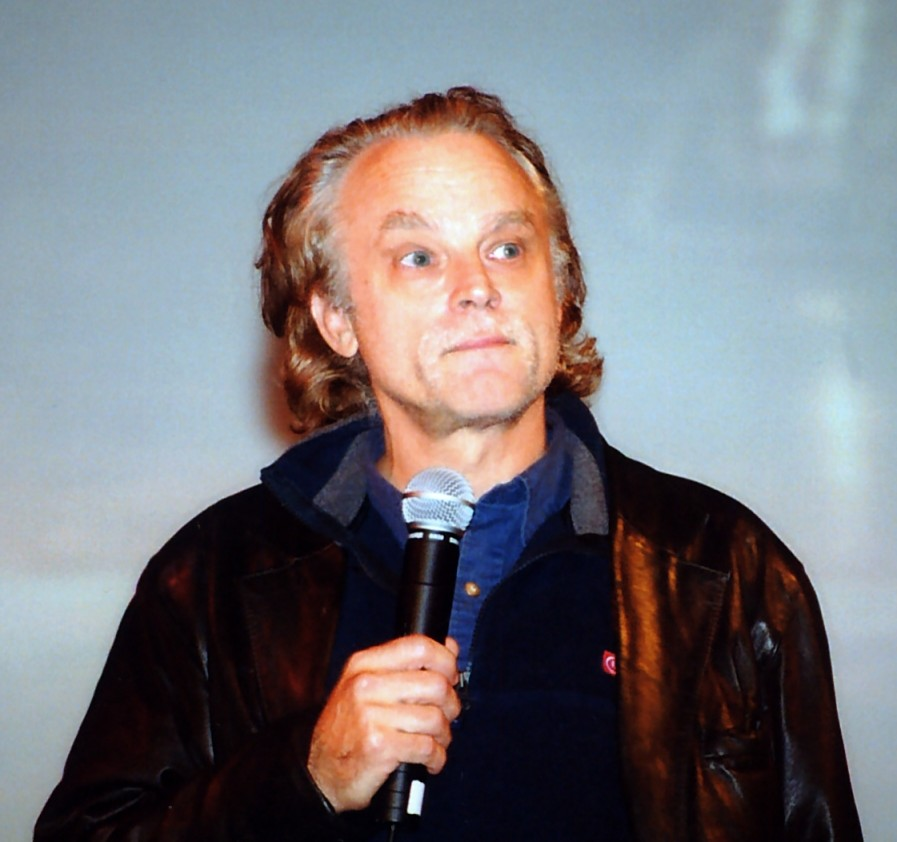
Brad Dourif

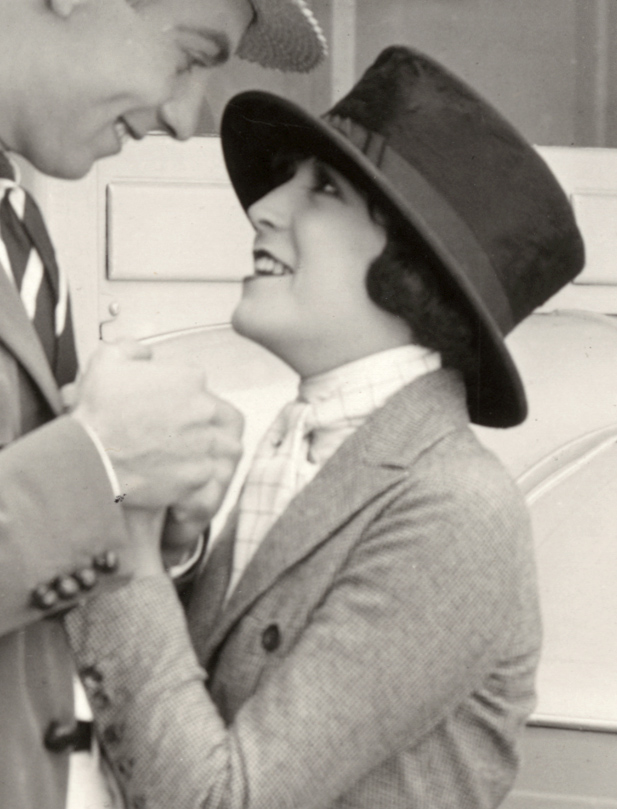
Virginia Fox

- Hasil Adkins, musician
- Michael Ammar, magician
- Karen Austin, actress
- Charlie Barnett, actor, comedian
- Lina Basquette, actress
- Leon "Chu" Berry, jazz saxophonist
- Charles Blevins, musician
- Chris Booker, radio DJ, TV personality
- Bobby Campo, actor
- Mark Carman, producer, songwriter
- Jean Carson, actress
- Bernie Casey, actor
- Kevin Cassidy, gospel/retired country singer
- Ted Cassidy, actor
- Joe Cerisano, singer-songwriter
- Michael Cerveris, actor, singer-songwriter
- John Davis Chandler, actor
- Larry Combs, clarinetist
- Stoney Cooper, country/bluegrass singer
- Wilma Lee Cooper, country/bluegrass singer
- John Corbett, actor
- Billy Cox, bassist
- George Crumb, composer
- Phyllis Curtin, operatic soprano, NYCO
- Frank De Vol, film composer, actor
- Joyce DeWitt, actress; Three's Company
- Hazel Dickens, bluegrass singer
- Little Jimmy Dickens, country singer; Country Music Hall of Fame inductee
- Brad Divens, vocalist, musician, Wrathchild America, Kix
- Paul Dooley, actor, writer and comedian
- Brad Dourif, actor
- Joanne Dru, actress
- Greg Dulli, singer, The Afghan Whigs
- Virginia Egnor (also known as Dagmar), actress, model, TV personality
- Conchata Ferrell, actress
- Sierra Ferrell, singer-songwriter
- Virginia Fox, silent-film actress; frequent co-star with Buster Keaton
- Jennifer Garner, actress
- Randy Gilkey, singer-songwriter
- Larry Groce, musician, radio personality

H–M

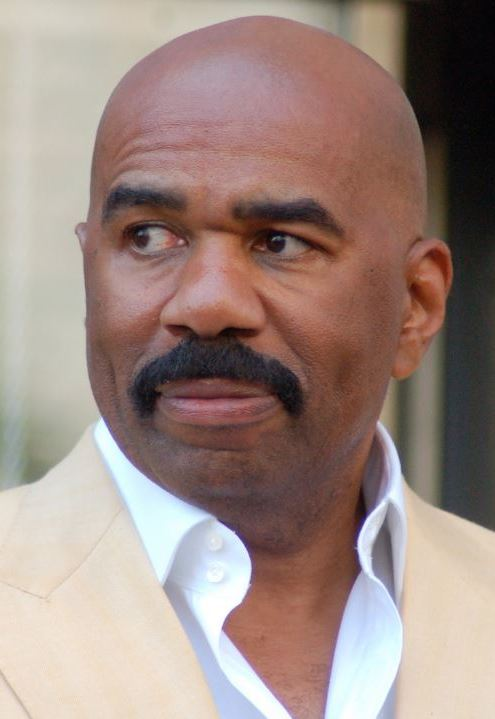
Steve Harvey

Don Knotts

- Ed Haley, blind professional fiddler
- Joshua Harto, actor, writer, producer
- Steve Harvey, comedian, TV personality
- Hawkshaw Hawkins, country music singer
- Allison Hayes, actress
- Blind Joe Hill, one-man band
- Frank Hutchison, slide guitar player
- Katie Lee Joel, television host
- Johnnie Johnson, blues musician
- Daniel Johnston, musician, artist; subject of film The Devil and Daniel Johnston
- Lawrence Kasdan, director, producer, screenwriter
- Lesli Kay, actress, As The World Turns, The Bold and the Beautiful
- Fuzzy Knight, actor
- Don Knotts, actor
- Shannon Larkin, musician, Godsmack
- Rex Lease, actor
- Jake E. Lee, rock guitarist
- Kristi Lee, TV personality, director of The Bob & Tom Show
- Traci Lords, actress
- Ann Magnuson, actress
- Peter Marshall, musician, actor, host of TV's Hollywood Squares
- Kathy Mattea, country and bluegrass performer
- Charlie McCoy, musician
- Russ McCubbin, actor, stuntman, comedian
- Justin McElroy, Travis McElroy, and Griffin McElroy, hosts of My Brother, My Brother and Me
- Elizabeth McLaughlin, actress
- Garnet Mimms, soul singer
- Landau Eugene Murphy Jr., singer, winner of America's Got Talent, Season 6 (2010)
- Lou Myers, actor

N–Z

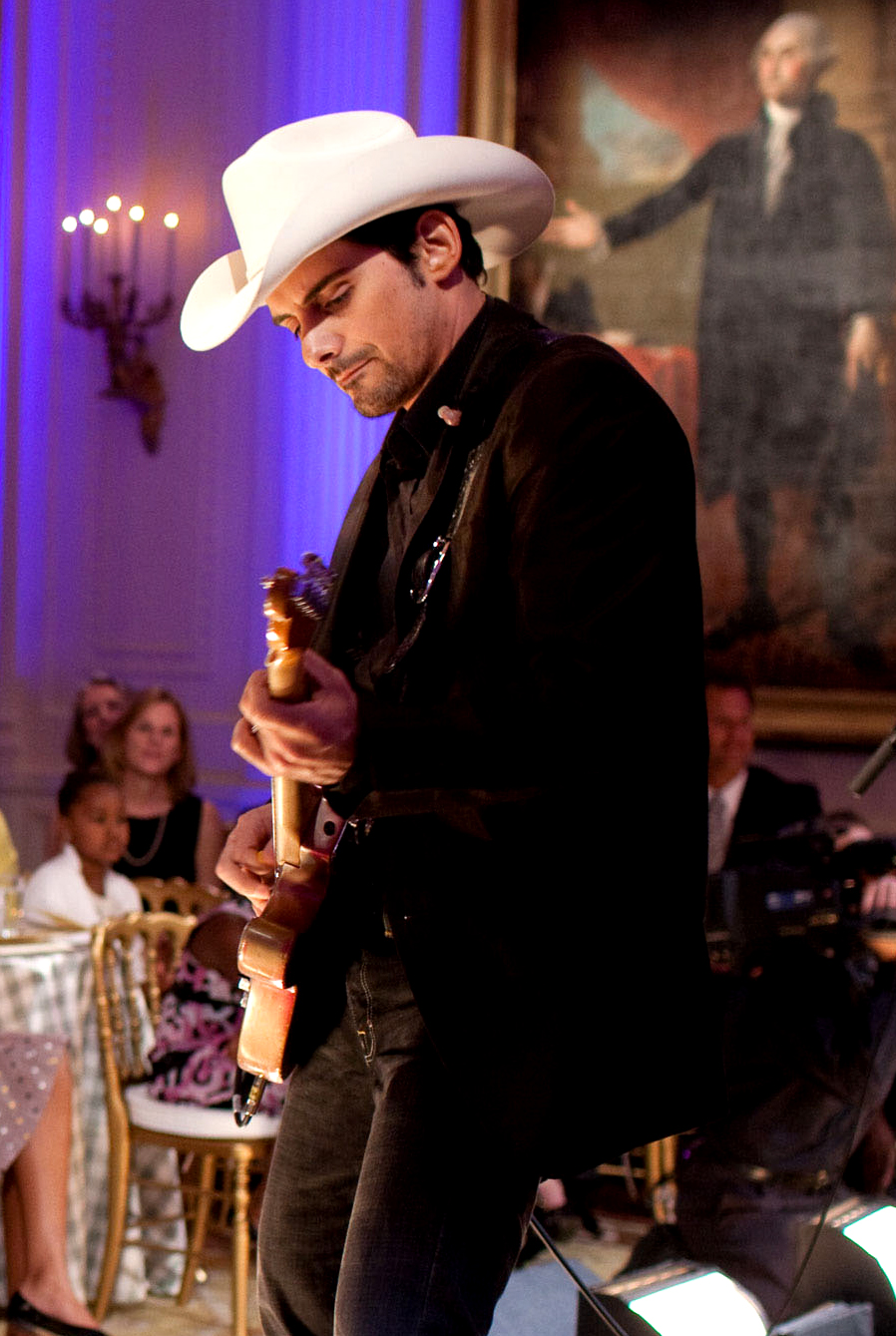
Brad Paisley

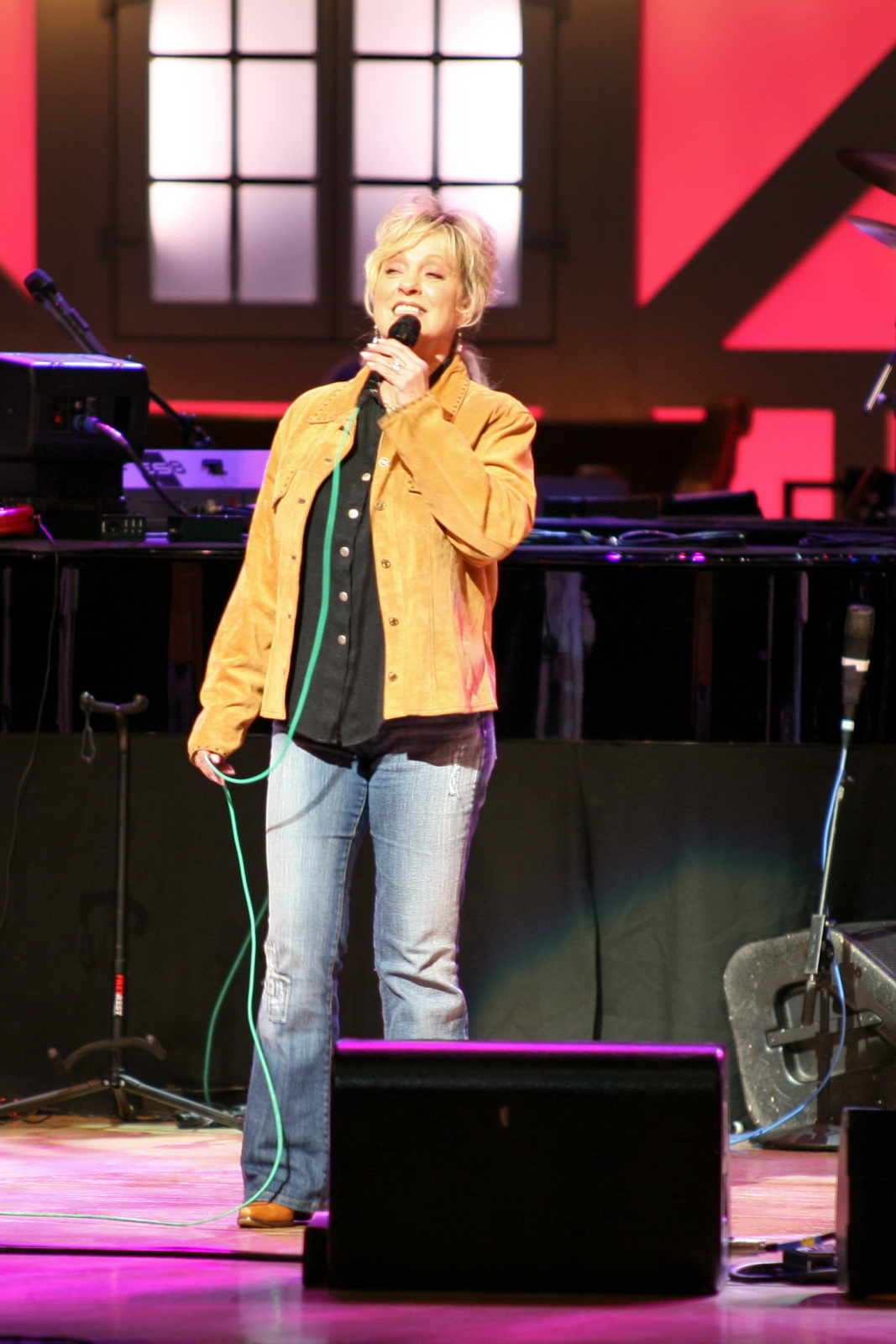
Connie Smith

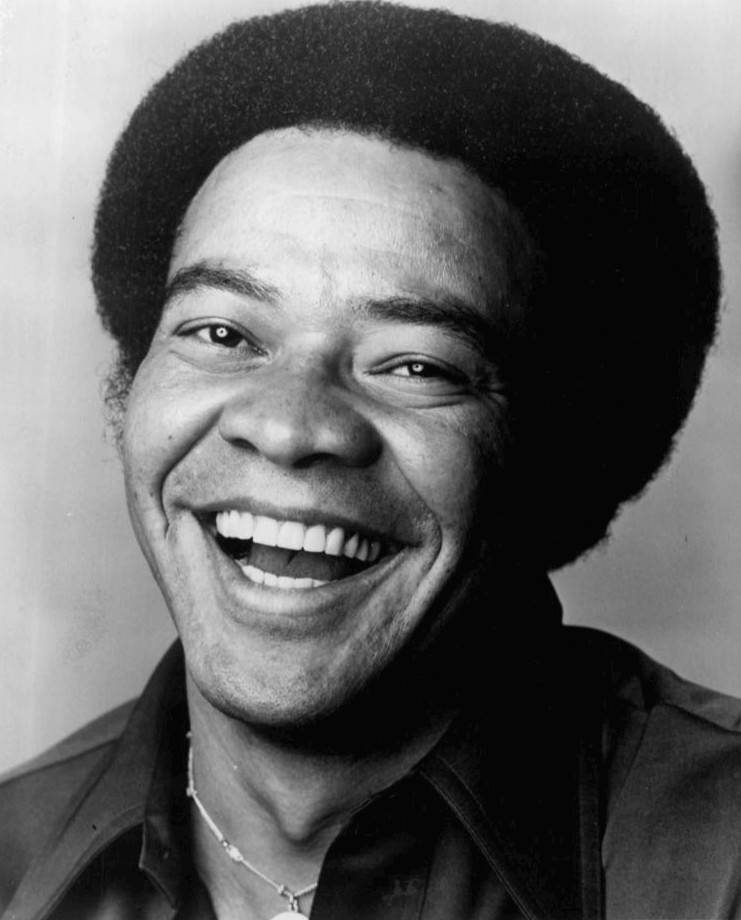
Bill Withers

- Tim O'Brien, bluegrass musician
- Brooklyn Nelson, actress
- Devon Odessa, producer, actress, My So-Called Life
- Brad Paisley, country singer-songwriter
- Will Pan, rapper, actor
- Sam Pancake, actor
- Squire Parsons, gospel singer
- Johnny Paycheck, country musician
- Rachel Proctor, country singer-songwriter
- Don Redman, jazz musician and bandleader
- Ashlie Rhey, actress, writer
- Jeff Richmond, producer, composer
- Tyler Robertson, bluegrass singer/musician
- Walter E. "Jack" Rollins, songwriter
- Soupy Sales, actor and comedian
- Frank "Poncho" Sampedro, guitarist for Neil Young's band
- Chris Sarandon, actor, activist
- David Selby, actor
- Robert R. Shafer, actor
- Art Simmons, Jazz Pianist
- Elaine McMillion Sheldon, director, producer, writer
- Bill Slater, radio personality, host of Twenty Questions
- Connie Smith, country singer, Country Music Hall of Fame inductee
- Fred "Sonic" Smith, guitarist for MC5
- Michael W. Smith, contemporary Christian singer-songwriter
- Red Sovine, country singer
- Morgan Spurlock, film director, screenwriter
- Blaze Starr, stripper and burlesque star
- Aaron Staton, actor; Mad Men
- Eleanor Steber, soprano, The Metropolitan Opera, NYC
- Josh Stewart, actor
- Sam Trammell, actor, True Blood
- Ryan Upchurch, country, rap and rock songwriter
- Teddy Weatherford, jazz pianist
- Patty Weaver, actress
- Donald Ray White, mountain dancer
- Jesse "Jesco" White, mountain dancer
- Steve Whiteman, former Kix singer
- Garland Wilson, jazz pianist
- Melvin Wine, fiddler
- Bill Withers, singer-songwriter
- Bobby Wright, country singer
- Frankie Yankovic, polka musician

== Frontiersmen ==
- Patrick Gass, frontiersman
- Morgan Morgan, frontiersman
- Lewis Wetzel, frontiersman

== Journalism ==
- William E. Chilton, newspaper publisher and politician
- J. R. Clifford, journalist, first African-American lawyer in West Virginia; founder of the Pioneer Press
- George Esper, newspaper reporter; known for his coverage of the Vietnam War for the Associated Press
- John S. Knight, newspaper publisher and editor
- Hoda Kotb, television reporter; host of Today
- Molly Line, news correspondent for Fox News Channel
- Herbert Morrison, radio reporter; known for his coverage of the Hindenburg disaster
- Asra Nomani, Indian-American journalist, author, and feminist
- Mike Patrick, sportscaster
- Michael Tomasky, newspaper writer and editor
- Carter G. Woodson, historian, author, and journalist

== Literature and art ==
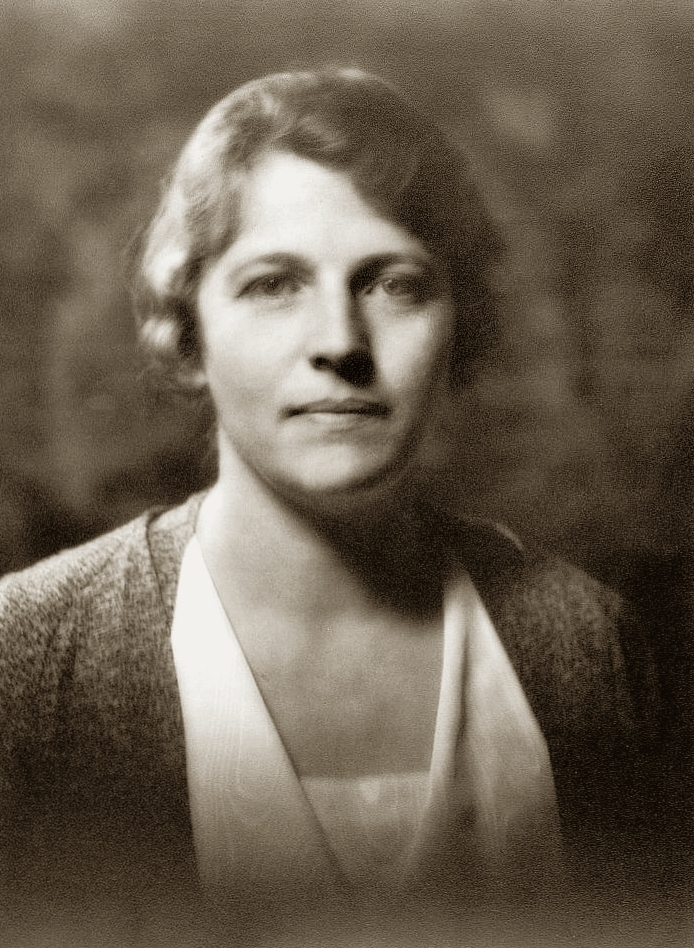
Pearl S. Buck

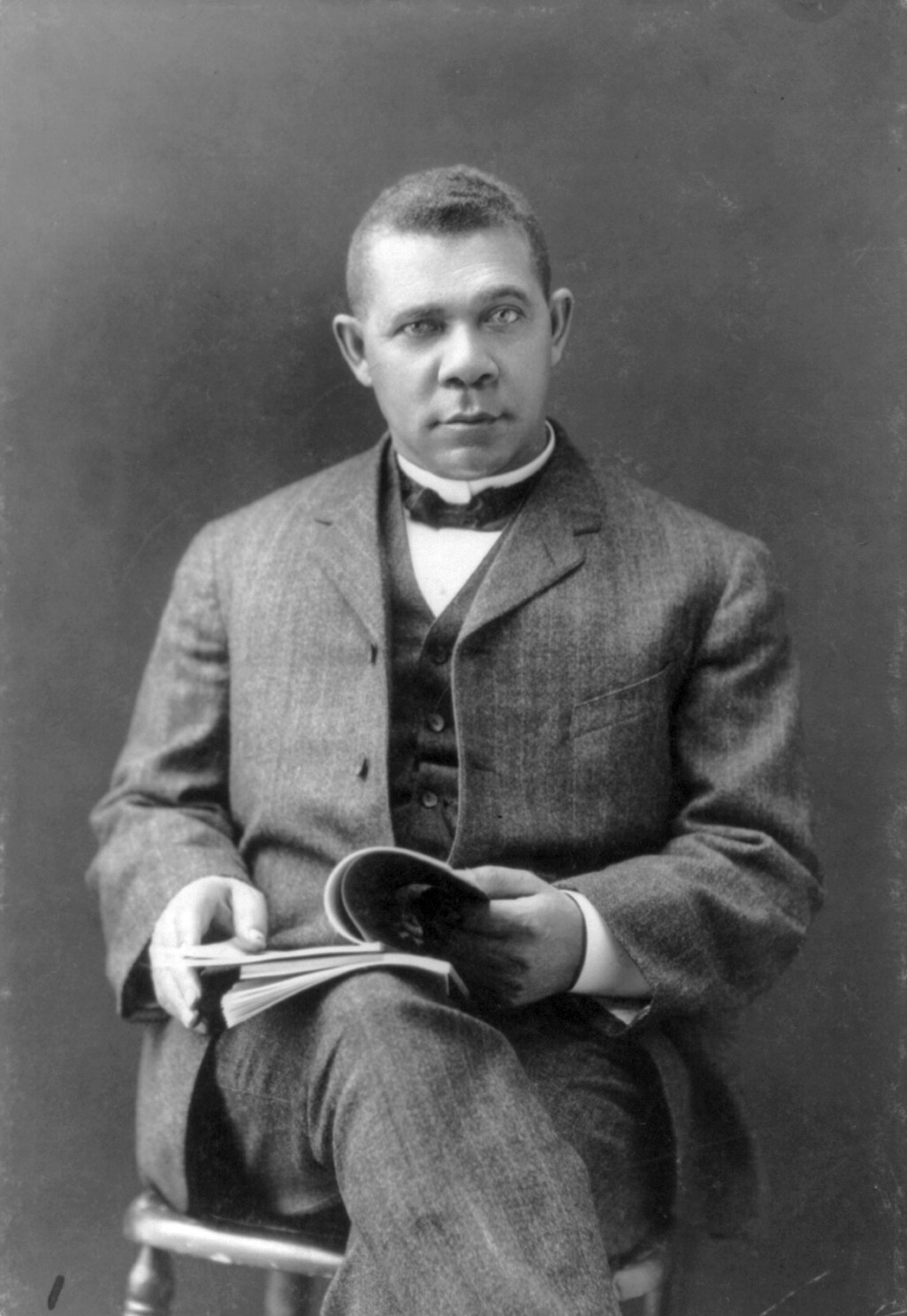
Booker T. Washington

- Allen Appel, novelist
- Annie Latham Bartlett, sculptor
- John Peale Bishop, poet, man of letters
- Florence V. Brittingham, poet and short story writer
- Pearl S. Buck, writer and Nobel Prize winner
- Bob Carroll, historian, author
- Stephen Coonts, novelist
- Rebecca Harding Davis, short story writer
- Alice Mary Dowd, educator and author
- Henry Louis Gates Jr., author, educator, and scholar
- Denise Giardina, author
- Linda Goodman, poet, novelist, best-selling astrology writer
- Davis Grubb, novelist
- Charley Harper, artist
- Homer Hickam, writer
- Craig Johnson, novelist
- John Knowles, novelist
- William Robinson Leigh, artist
- Keith Maillard, novelist, poet
- Scott McClanahan, writer
- Brooke McEldowney, cartoonist; creator of 9 Chickweed Lane comic strip
- Jeannie Blackburn Moran (1842–1929), author, community leader, socialite, and philanthropist
- Ehrman Syme Nadal, author
- Breece D'J Pancake, short fiction writer, author of Trilobites
- Roger Price, creator of Mad Libs and Droodles
- Jedediah Purdy, author and professor
- Mary Lee Settle, author
- Beau Smith, comic book writer
- Jean Edward Smith, biographer
- David Hunter Strother (aka Porte Crayon), artist
- Timothy Truman, writer, artist, and musician
- Jeannette Walls, author and columnist
- Booker T. Washington, political leader, educator, and author
- Tom Wilson, creator of Ziggy comic strip

== Military ==
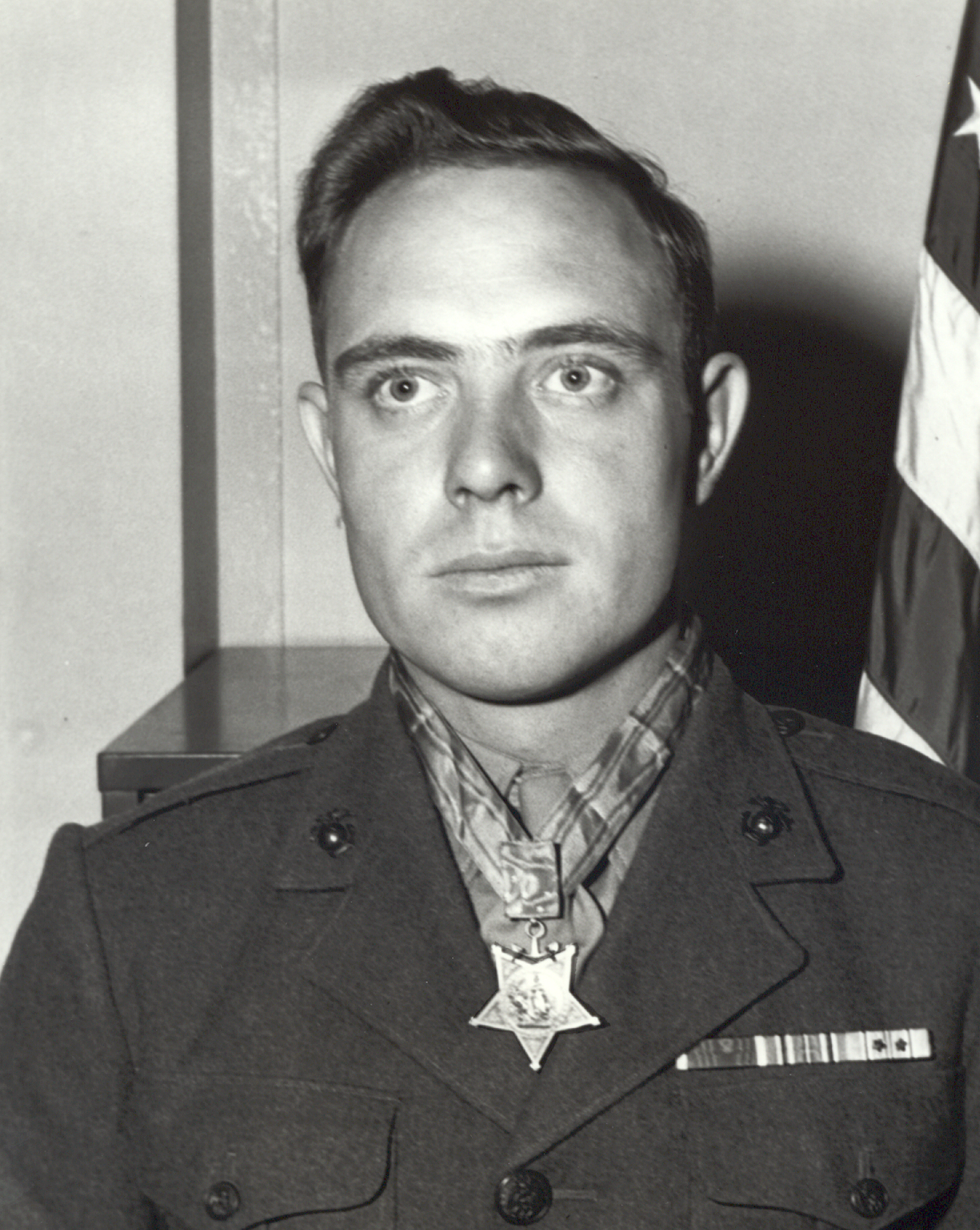
Hershel W. Williams

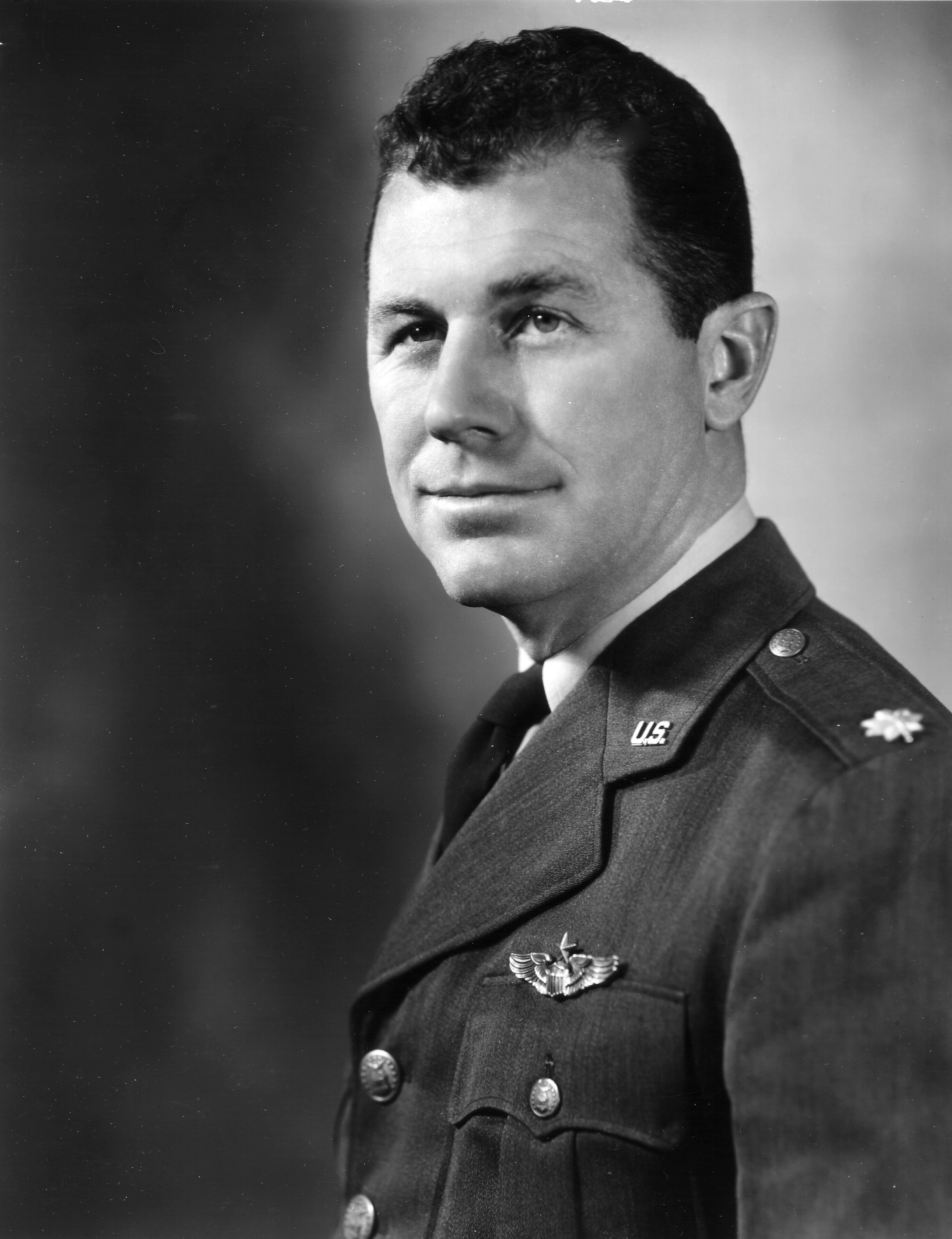
Chuck Yeager

- John James Abert, explorer and soldier
- Earl E. Anderson, U.S. Marine Corps general
- John Ashby, frontiersman and soldier
- Woodrow Wilson Barr, U.S. Marine
- Ted Belcher, U.S. Army soldier, Medal of Honor recipient
- Ruby Bradley, most-decorated woman in U.S. military history
- Frank Buckles, last-surviving U.S. veteran of World War I
- Adelbert Rinaldo Buffington, U.S. Army brigadier general, 10th chief of ordnance for the U.S. Army Ordnance Corps
- French Ensor Chadwick, U.S. Navy officer and educator
- Lynndie England, U.S. Army reservist involved in the Abu Ghraib torture and prisoner abuse scandal
- Stonewall Jackson, C.S. Army general born in Clarksburg and died before the region was formed into West Virginia
- Albert G. Jenkins, general and politician
- Jonah Edward Kelley, U.S. Army soldier; Medal of Honor recipient
- Edwin Gray Lee, C.S. Army general born in Shepherdstown before it became part of the newly formed West Virginia
- Carwood Lipton, U.S. Army soldier
- John P. Lucas, U.S. Army general; commander at Battle of Anzio
- Jessica Lynch, prisoner of war
- Basil L. Plumley, U.S. Army command sergeant major
- William E. Shuck Jr., U.S. Marine, Medal of Honor recipient
- M. Jeff. Thompson, Mo. State Guard general
- Hershel W. Williams, U.S. Marine, Medal of Honor recipient
- John Yarnall, U.S. Navy officer
- Chuck Yeager, aviator

== Politics and government ==
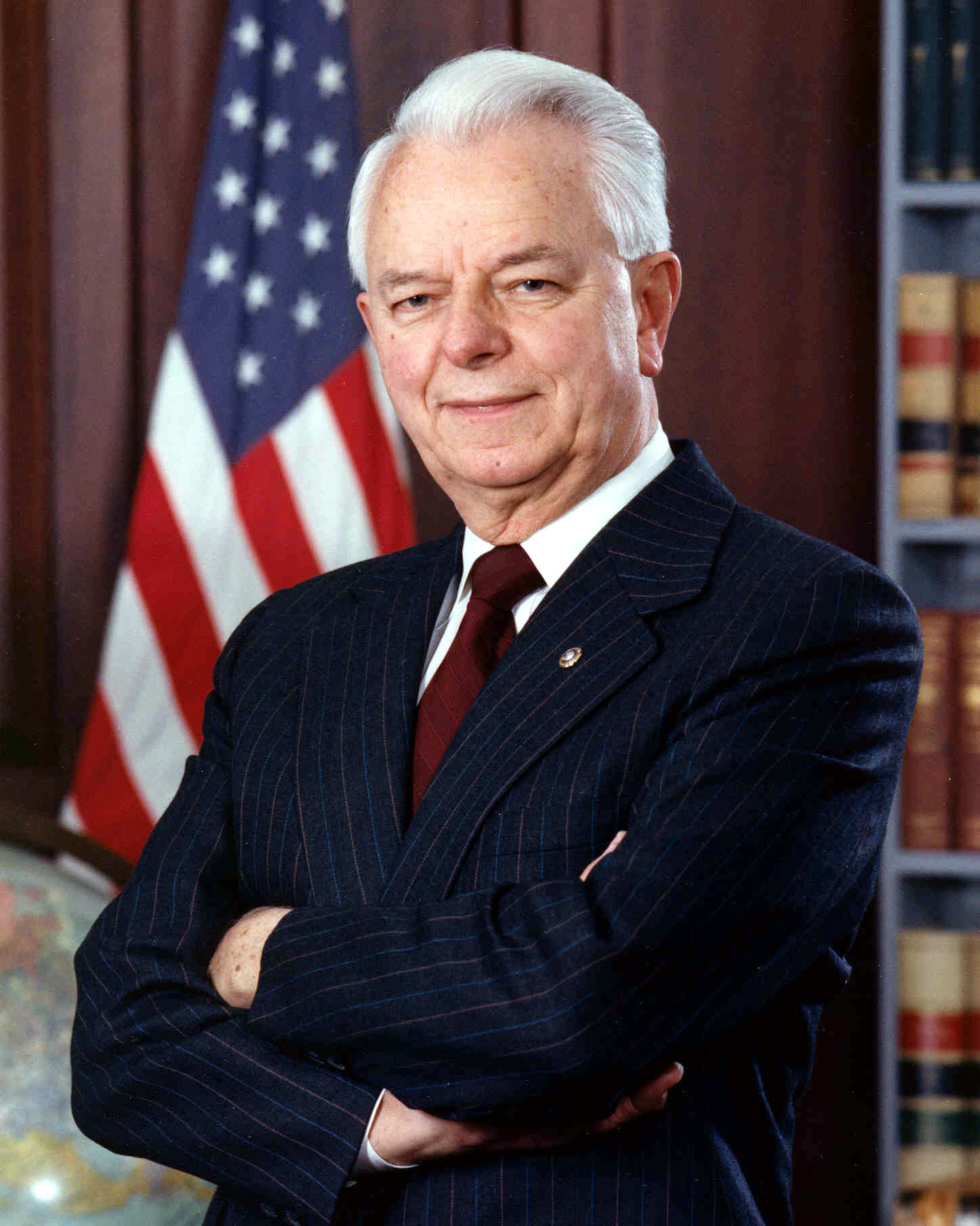
Robert C. Byrd

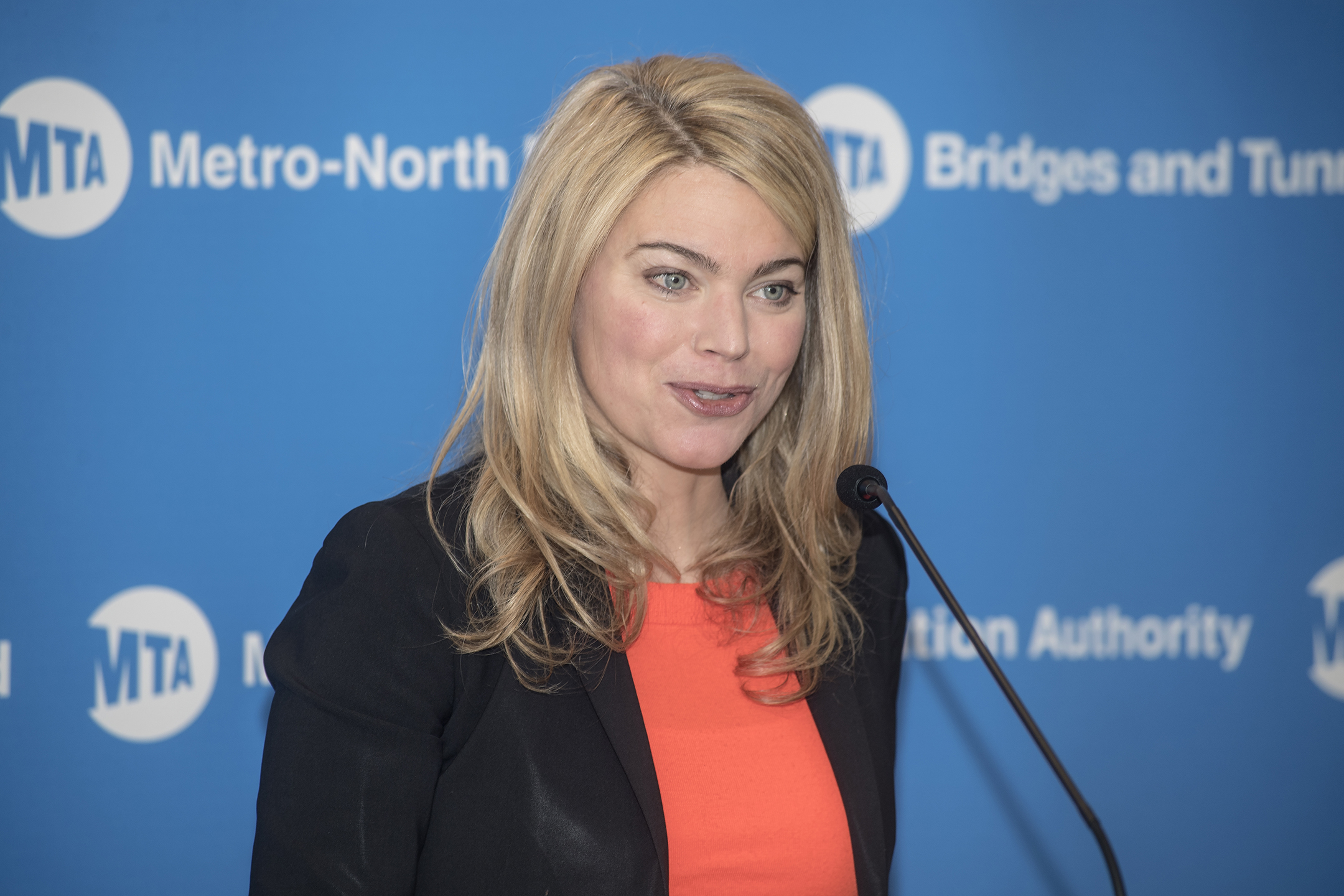
Sarah Feinberg

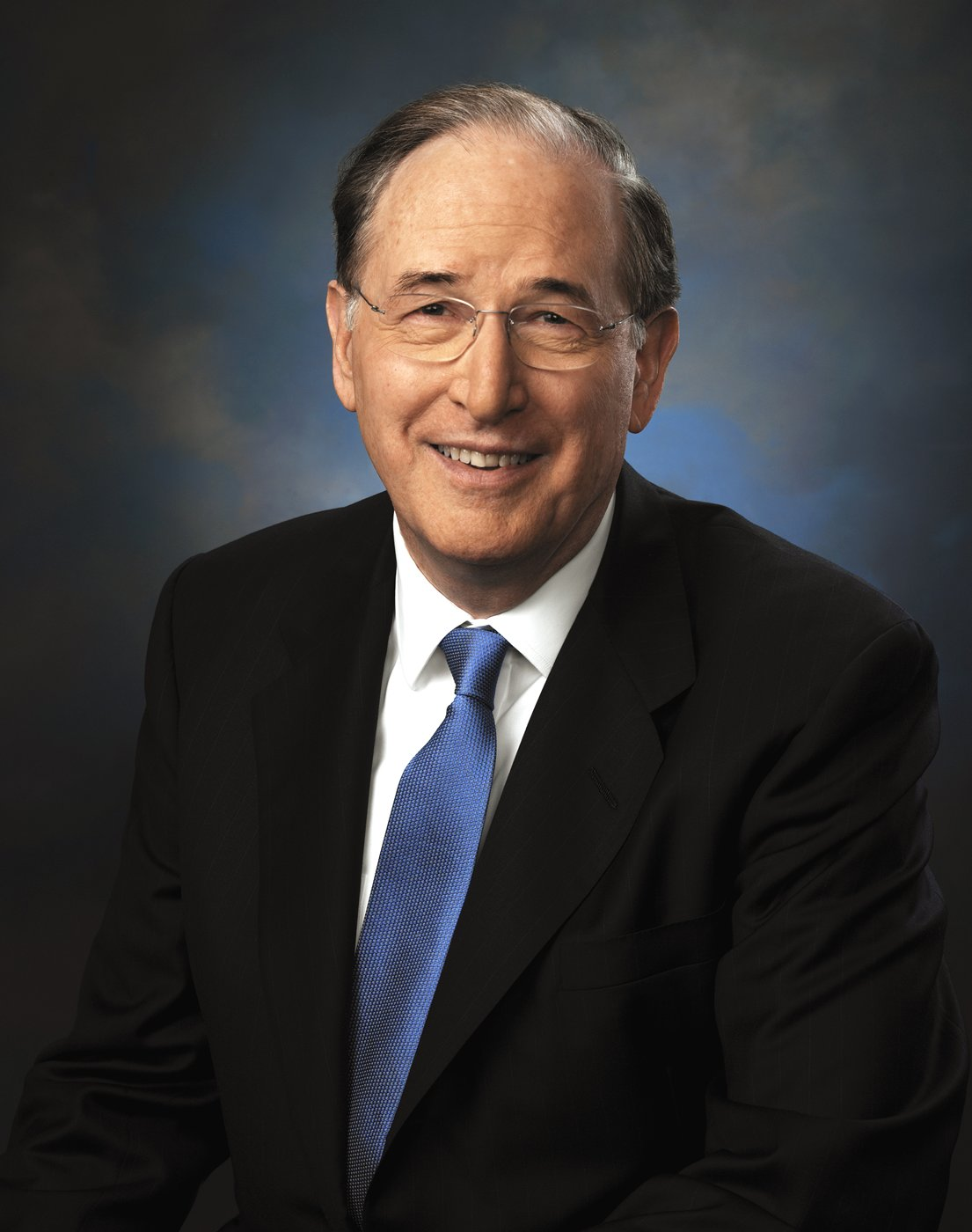
Jay Rockefeller

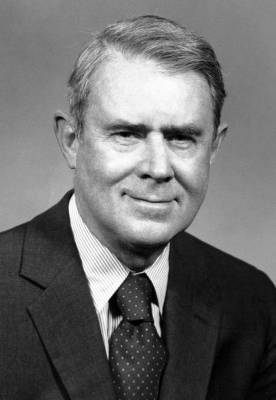
Cyrus Vance

- Newton D. Baker, politician
- William Wallace Barron, politician
- John J. Beckley, frontiersman and Librarian of Congress
- Ephraim Bee, frontiersman and politician
- Charles Bent, frontiersman and politician
- Arthur I. Boreman, politician
- Sylvia Mathews Burwell, politician, university president
- Harry F. Byrd, politician
- Robert Byrd, U.S. senator and majority leader, longest-serving member of Senate (51 years, 5 months, 21 days)
- Gaston Caperton, politician
- Shelley Moore Capito, politician
- Thomas R. Carper, economist and politician
- William Henry Harrison Cook, state legislator
- John J. Cornwell, politician
- Henry G. Davis, politician
- John W. Davis, politician and attorney, Democratic Party nominee for U.S. president (1924)
- Wilfred Lee Dickerson, politician
- Stephen Benton Elkins, politician
- Sarah Feinberg (born 1977), interim president of the New York City Transit Authority, and former Administrator of the Federal Railroad Administration
- Walter Lowrie Fisher, U.S. secretary of interior
- Mark Funkhouser, politician; mayor of Kansas City, Missouri
- William E. Glasscock, politician
- Nathan Goff Jr., politician
- Howard Mason Gore, politician
- Henry D. Hatfield, politician
- Ken Hechler, politician and author
- Brad Hoylman (born 1965), New York state senator
- John J. Jacob, politician
- Evan Jenkins, state senator
- Elizabeth Kee, politician
- John E. Kenna, politician
- Chief Logan, Native-American leader
- William A. MacCorkle, politician
- Joe Manchin, politician
- William C. Marland, politician
- Thomas Massie, congressman
- Bruce Marks (born 1957), politician
- Roy L. McCulty, politician
- Arch A. Moore Jr., politician
- Dwight Morrow, diplomat; father-in-law of Charles Lindbergh
- Matthew M. Neely, politician
- Bob Ney, politician
- William Smith O'Brien, representative
- Okey L. Patteson, politician
- Francis Harrison Pierpont, politician, "father of West Virginia"
- Nick Rahall, politician
- Jennings Randolph, politician
- Absalom Willis Robertson, politician
- Jay Rockefeller, politician
- Hulett C. Smith, politician
- William E. Stevenson, politician
- Cecil H. Underwood, politician
- Cyrus Vance, U.S. secretary of state
- Kelli Ward, politician
- Charles Washington, statesman
- Erik Wells, politician and news anchor
- Bob Wise, politician

== Religion ==
- Alexander Campbell, Restoration Movement leader
- Matthew W. Clair, Methodist Episcopal Church bishop
- Belle Caldwell Culbertson, missionary, author, philanthropist
- T. D. Jakes, televangelist
- B. R. Lakin, evangelist

== Science ==
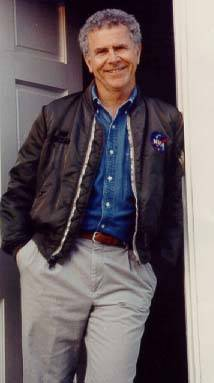
Homer Hickam

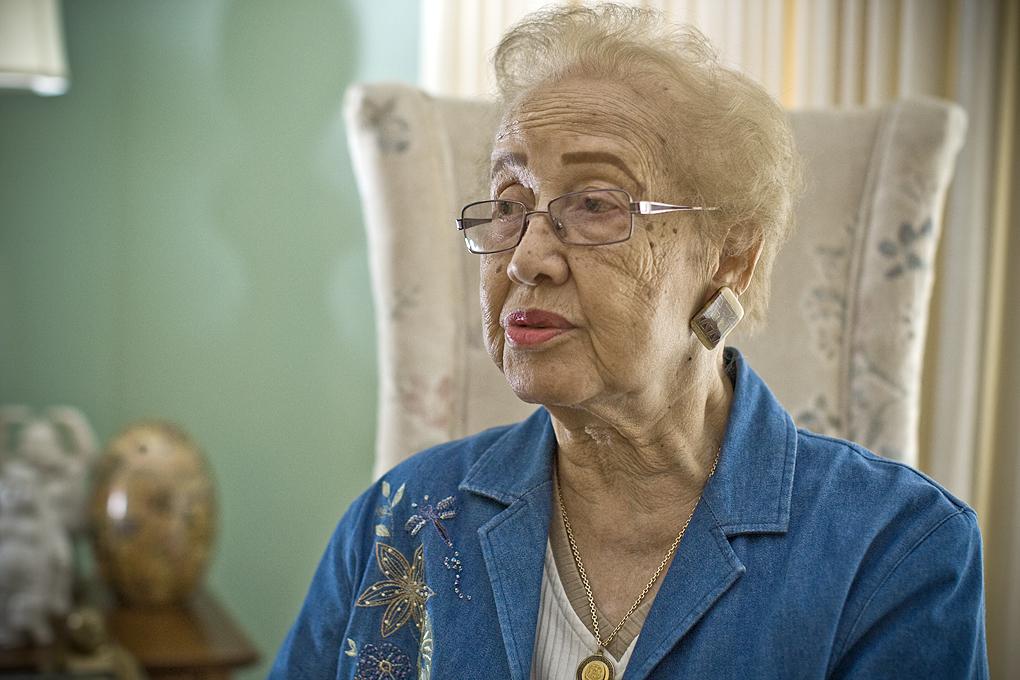
Katherine Johnson

- Eugene Aserinsky, discovered rapid eye movement sleep (REM)
- Maurice Brooks, ornithologist
- Earl Lemley Core, botanist
- Homer Hickam, former NASA engineer
- Andrew Delmar Hopkins, entomologist
- Katherine Johnson, mathematician and NASA computer scientist
- Carl D. Keith, chemist, invented three-way catalytic converter
- Angie Turner King, chemist, mathematician and educator
- Mahlon Loomis, inventor of the wireless telegraph
- Robert J. Marks II, electrical engineer
- Joseph Maroon, neurosurgeon
- Jon McBride, NASA astronaut; pilot of Space Shuttle Challenger mission STS-41-G (1984)
- Adrian Melott, physicist and cosmologist
- George A. Miller, psychologist and cognitive scientist
- John Forbes Nash, mathematician
- James Rumsey, inventor and mechanical engineer
- Charles Marstiller Vest, educator and mechanical engineer

== Other ==
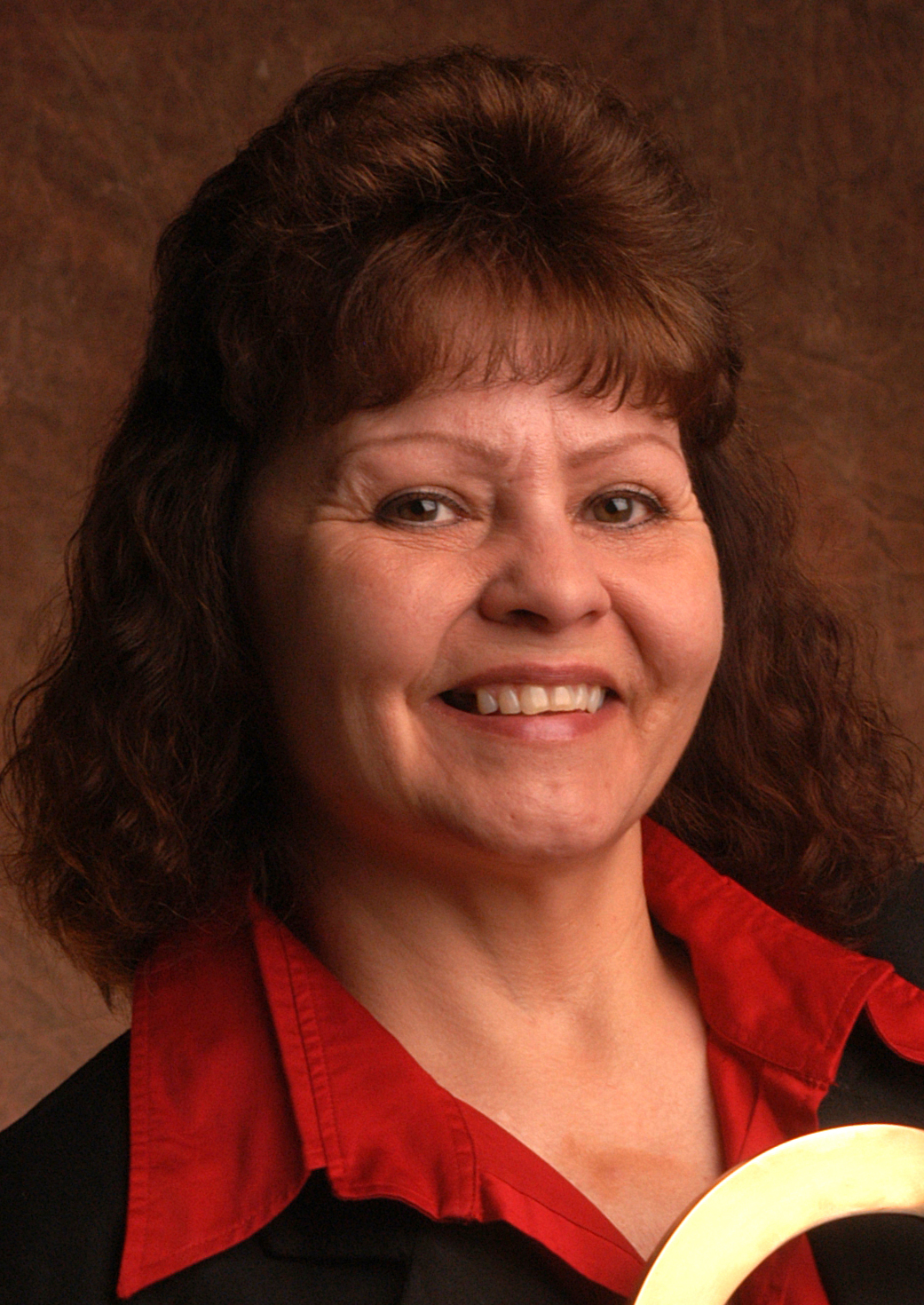
Julia Bonds

- James J. Andrews, espionage agent
- Bill Blizzard, labor leader
- Julia Bonds, environmental activist; winner of Goldman Prize
- Belle Boyd, espionage agent
- James Caudy, frontiersman and early settler of present day West Virginia
- B. Kwaku Duren lawyer, educator, writer, editor, Black Panther, long-time social, political and community activist
- Larry Gibson, environmental activist; founder of Keeper of the Mountains Foundation
- Nancy Hanks, mother of Abraham Lincoln; distant cousin of Tom Hanks
- Devil Anse Hatfield, patriarch of Hatfield clan of 19th-century Hatfield–McCoy feud
- Sid Hatfield, Matewan police chief, prominent figure in labor history
- Jacob and Samuel Hawken, designers of Hawken rifle
- Kristan Hawkins, activist and president of Students for Life of America
- John Henry, steel-driving man of folklore
- Glen and Bessie Hyde, disappeared raftsmen
- Anna Jarvis, founder of Mother's Day in United States
- Mary Harris "Mother" Jones, labor and community organizer
- Charles Manson, convicted murderer
- Randal McCloy, lone survivor of 2006 Sago Mine disaster
- Stephen Murphy, ex-DEA agent; along with Javier Peña, one of the lead investigators in the manhunt of Colombian drug smuggler Pablo Escobar
- Harry Powers, serial killer
- Patsy Paugh Ramsey, Miss West Virginia; mother of JonBenét Ramsey
- Walter Reuther, labor leader
- Cecil Roberts, United Mine Workers president
- Leon Sullivan, civil rights activist
- Harry R. Truman, volcano victim; owner of lodge at Mount St. Helens
- Jack Whittaker, lottery winner

== See also ==
- List of Marshall University people
- List of West Virginia attorneys general
- List of West Virginia suffragists
- List of West Virginia University alumni
