= Abortion in Missouri =

Constitutional Amendment 3
Results
Choice	Votes	%
Yes	1,538,659	51.60%
No	1,443,022	48.40%
- Results by county

Abortion in Missouri is legal up to the point of fetal viability as a result of 2024 Missouri Amendment 3, which took effect in December 2024 after narrowly passing in the November 5 general election. Legal challenges to allow access are ongoing, and clinics were able to open on February 15, 2025.

At least one clinic in Kansas City and St. Louis is providing abortions. A clinic in Columbia opened up in March 2025.

In 2014, a poll by the Pew Research Center found that 45% of Missouri adults said that abortion should be legal vs. 50% that believe it should be illegal in all or most cases and 5% that do not know. The 2023 American Values Atlas reported that, in their most recent survey, 55% of Missourians said that abortion should be legal in all or most cases.

== Context ==
Abortion in Missouri was legalized after the Roe v. Wade decision in 1973. Peaking at 29 abortion clinics in 1982, the number began to decline, going from twelve in 1992 to one in 2014, down to zero for a time in 2016, but back to one from 2017 to May 2019 when the last remaining clinic announced it would likely lose its license. However, the clinic remained open as of 2020. According to the Guttmacher Institute, in 2017, there were 4,710 abortions in Missouri. There was an eight percent decline in the abortion rate in Missouri between 2014 and 2017, from 4.4 to 4.0 abortions per 1,000 women of reproductive age.

According to a 2017 report from the Center for Reproductive Rights and Ibis Reproductive Health, states that tried to pass additional constraints on a women's ability to access legal abortions had fewer policies supporting women's health, maternal health and, children's health. These states also tended to resist expanding Medicaid, family leave, medical leave, and sex education in public schools. In 2017, Georgia, Ohio, Missouri, Louisiana, Alabama and Mississippi have among the highest rates of infant mortality in the United States. In 2017, Missouri had an infant mortality rate of 6.2 infant deaths per 1,000 live births. Medicaid expansion under the Affordable Care Act was rejected by Alabama, Georgia, Mississippi and Missouri. Consequently, poor women in the typical age range to become mothers had a gap in coverage for prenatal care. According to Georgetown University Center for Children and Families research professor Adam Searing, "The uninsured rate for women of childbearing age is nearly twice as high in states that have not expanded Medicaid. That means many more women don't have health coverage before getting pregnant or after having their children. If states expanded Medicaid coverage, they would improve the health of mothers and babies and save lives." According to the 2018 America's Health Rankings, Missouri ranked 42nd among US states for maternal mortality.

Following the overturning of Roe v. Wade in 2022, the United States maternal and infant mortality rate rose for the first time in 20 years. More than 30 states saw at least slight rises in infant mortality rates in 2022, but four had statistically significant increases - Georgia, Iowa, Missouri and Texas.

Missouri was the first state to enforce its abortion ban after Dobbs v. Jackson Women's Health Organization was decided in 2022. From 2022 to 2024, abortions were only legal in cases of medical emergencies, with several additional laws designed to make accessing abortion services difficult.

== Current status ==
Missouri has not repealed other laws related to abortion, although they are no longer valid. In particular, medication abortion is the subject of ongoing litigation in Missouri, while in-person surgical abortions are offered.

Missouri law continues to include requirements that women must undergo a mandatory seventy-two-hour waiting period, receive counseling, and be offered an ultrasound. It prohibits public funding or private insurance to pay for abortion. The waiting period and biased counseling provisions are currently enjoined. The state continues to require that both parents, a legal guardian, or a judge consent to a minor’s abortion. If a parent consents, that parent is required to notify the other parent.

Missouri retains targeted regulation of abortion providers (TRAP) laws related to facilities, admitting privileges, and reporting, however the admitting privileges provision is enjoined. Missouri law continues to restrict the provision of abortion to physicians and restricts providers from using telemedicine for the provision of abortion though this provision is currently enjoined.

== History ==
=== Legislative history ===
By the end of the 1800s, all states in the Union except Louisiana had therapeutic exceptions in their legislative bans on abortions. In the 19th century, bans by state legislatures on abortion were about protecting the life of the mother given the number of deaths caused by abortions; state governments saw themselves as looking out for the lives of their citizens.

Missouri passed a parental consent law in the early 1990s. This law impacted when minors sought abortions, resulting in an increase of 19% to 22% for abortions sought after 12 weeks. The state was one of 10 states in 2007 to have a customary informed consent provision for abortions.

In 2015, the state was one of five where the legislature introduced a bill that would have banned abortion in almost all cases. It did not pass. They tried and failed again in 2017 and 2018. The 2018 bill was introduced in the legislature to ban abortion after 15 weeks. Around 2016, the state legislature passed a law that said facilities providing abortions needed to be licensed ambulatory surgical centers and to have hospital admitting privileges. The state legislature was one of eight states nationwide that tried and failed to pass a fetal heartbeat bill in 2017. They tried and failed again in 2018.

Nationally, 2019 was one of the most active years for state legislatures to try to pass abortion rights restrictions. These state governments generally saw this as a positive sign that new moves to restrict abortion rights, would less likely face resistance by the courts. In mid-2019, the state legislature passed a law that would make abortion illegal in almost all cases after eight weeks. The state was one of several states that passed such laws in May 2019 - others were Georgia, Louisiana, and Alabama. The law was a "fetal heartbeat" bill.

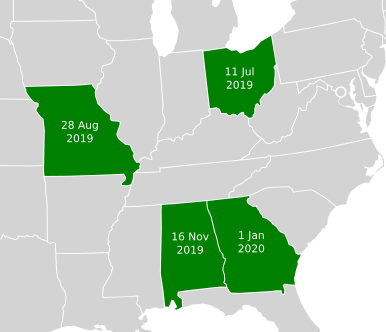
Dates of when heartbeat laws come into effect (as of May 25, 2019)

Two fetal heartbeat bills were filed in Missouri on January 9, 2019. SB 139 was filed in the Missouri Senate by Sen. Andrew Koenig; the bill died in committee. HB 126 was filed in the Missouri House of Representatives by Rep. Nick Schroer. On January 30, 2019, HB 126 was referred to the Children and Families Committee, and on February 12, 2019, a public hearing on the bill was completed. On February 21, 2018, HB 126 was voted out of committee to the full House with the recommendation that it "do pass". On February 27, 2019, HB 126 was passed out of the Missouri House and was sent to the state Senate. Missouri's House Speaker Elijah Haahr has said he supports the "heartbeat bill" calling it a top priority for the 2019 session. When asked if he would sign a fetal heartbeat bill, Governor Mike Parson said, "I've been pro-life my entire career, and I support that all the time." At the time the bill passed, only 25% of the state legislators were female.

In March 2019, Missouri Family Health Council was the state's only Title X administrator. The Council distributed approximately 34% of its funding to Planned Parenthood clinics. In 2019, women in Missouri were eligible for pregnancy accommodation and pregnancy-related disability as a result of legal abortion or miscarriage, and women who claimed such disability could not be treated differently than any other employee claiming disability.

On June 24, 2022, following the United States Supreme Court's ruling in Dobbs v. Jackson Women's Health Organization, Missouri Attorney General Eric Schmitt signed a legal opinion bringing into effect the state's "trigger law", HB126, banning all non-medically necessary abortions. Schmitt signed the opinion within minutes of the Dobbs decision being announced, and the Missouri Attorney General's Office thereafter declared that "Missouri has become the first in the country to effectively end abortion."

In December 2023, a bill proposing homicide charges for pregnant individuals who obtain abortions was proposed. The bill was withdrawn a few days later, following bipartisan backlash.

Republican lawmakers of Missouri in May 2025 approved a future referendum (by November 2026 or sooner) on whether to repeal November 2024 Missouri Amendment 3 (a successful referendum that legalized abortion) and instead institute an abortion ban except in the cases of medical emergencies, fetal anomalies, rape or incest, with the abortions for rape and incest only to be legal within 12 weeks from the woman's last period, and only if the rape or incest are documented to have been reported to law enforcement. 2026 Missouri Amendment 3 failed to pass, keeping abortion rights in the Missouri Constitution.

=== Judicial history ===
The US Supreme Court's decision in 1973's Roe v. Wade ruling meant the state could no longer regulate abortion in the first trimester. In 1979, a court found that the part of Missouri law dealing with women having abortions after the first trimester needing to have it performed in a hospital was unconstitutional. Webster v. Reproductive Health Services was before the US Supreme Court in 1989. The Court ruled in a case over a Missouri law that banned abortions from being performed in public buildings unless there was a need to save the life of the mother. It required physicians to determine if a fetus was past 20 weeks and was viable in addition to other restrictions on a woman's ability to get an abortion. The US Supreme Court essentially ruled in favor of the law, but made clear that this was not an overruling of Roe v. Wade. However, the Supreme Court overturned Roe v. Wade in Dobbs v. Jackson Women's Health Organization, No. 19-1392, 597 U.S. ___ (2022) later in 2022.

In 2019, a judge blocked a state law that would have banned abortion after eight weeks.

In 2023, some religious leaders initiated a lawsuit against the abortion ban, arguing that the underlying law had unconstitutionally imposed certain religious beliefs. The abortion law includes the following quote: "In recognition that Almighty God is the author of life, that all men and women are ‘endowed by their Creator with certain unalienable Rights, that among those are Life." In June 2024, Judge Jason Sengheiser rejected this lawsuit, stating: "While the determination that life begins at conception may run counter to some religious beliefs, it is not itself necessarily a religious belief".

Amendment 3, an initiative approved for the Missouri ballot in November 2024, passed. The initiative legalized abortion in the state up to the point of fetal viability by amending the state's constitution. State law provides that any constitutional amendment or new constitution shall take effect at the end of 30 days after the election when approved by a simple majority of the votes cast on the measure.

On December 20, 2024, a judge ruled that, under the new constitutional amendment, Missouri could not enforce its previous abortion ban, a 72-hour waiting period, nor an informed consent requirement.

In 2026, a Jackson County judge struck down many of the state's abortion restrictions as unconstitutional, including a 72-hour waiting period, a ban on telemedicine, special licensing requirements for abortion providers and restrictions on the abortion pill.

=== Clinic history ===
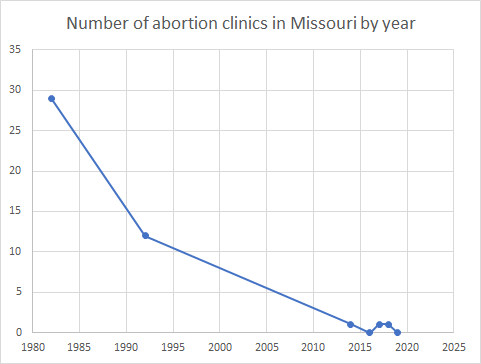
Number of abortion clinics in Missouri by year up to 2019

Following the Roe v. Wade ruling, several abortion clinics were quickly set up in the state. These included private suppliers, many of which remained in the state during the 1980s. Reproductive Health Services was a non-profit that provided abortion services in the state operating during that time. Between 1982 and 1992, the number of abortion clinics in the state decreased by 17, going from 29 in 1982 to 12 in 1992.

Planned Parenthood in St. Louis took over operations of Reproductive Health Services on May 1, 1996. Before this, while Planned Parenthood had operated in the state, they had not provided abortion services. In 1998, they moved three blocks to a new building. After TRAP laws came into effect in Missouri and Texas, women had to travel even greater distances to be able to visit an abortion clinic.

In 2014, there was only one abortion clinic in the state. In 2014, 99% of the counties in the state did not have an abortion clinic. That year, 94% of women in the state aged 15–44 lived in a county without an abortion clinic. In March 2016, there were 13 Planned Parenthood clinics in the state. In 2016, Planned Parenthood's clinic that provided abortions in Colombia had to stop doing so while they faced a court injunction they were challenging over the legal need to be a licensed ambulatory surgical center and to have hospital admitting privileges.

In 2017, there were 12 Planned Parenthood clinics, of which only 1 offered abortion services, in a state with a population of 1,365,575 women aged 15–49. Reproductive Health Services of Planned Parenthood St. Louis Region was the only licensed abortion service provider in the state in 2017, providing reproductive services primarily to women from Missouri and Illinois but also ten other states. Only about 10% of their operations were related to abortion services. In May 2019, the state was officially one of six in the nation with only one abortion clinic. On May 28, 2019, the sole remaining abortion clinic in Missouri announced it would likely be shutting down by the end of the week as the state pulled its operating license. They were seeking an injunction to prevent that from happening. They succeeded when Missouri Circuit Court Judge Michael Stelzer granted a temporary request, saying in giving the order that the clinic "demonstrated that immediate and irreparable injury will result" and also saying that doing so "is necessary to preserve the status quo and prevent irreparable injury." He then set a hearing date for June 4, 2019.

== Statistics ==
In the period between 1972 and 1974, there was zero recorded illegal abortion death in the state. In 1990, 597,000 women in the state faced the risk of an unintended pregnancy. In 2010, the state had zero publicly funded abortions. In 2013, among white women aged 15–19, there were 670 abortions, 440 abortions for black women aged 15–19, 80 abortions for Hispanic women aged 15–19, and 80 abortions for women of all other races. In 2014, 50% of adults said in a poll by the Pew Research Center that abortion should be illegal in all or most cases, while 45% believe it should be legal. In 2017, about 33% of abortions were performed using drug-induced abortions. The percentage had been increasing every year for several years.

Number of reported abortions, abortion rate and percentage change in rate by geographic region and state in 1992, 1995 and 1996
Census division and state	Number			Rate			% change 1992–1996
Census division and state	1992	1995	1996	1992	1995	1996	% change 1992–1996
West North Central	57,340	48,530	48,660	14.3	11.9	11.9	–16
Iowa	6,970	6,040	5,780	11.4	9.8	9.4	–17
Kansas	12,570	10,310	10,630	22.4	18.3	18.9	–16
Minnesota	16,180	14,910	14,660	15.6	14.2	13.9	–11
Missouri	13,510	10,540	10,810	11.6	8.9	9.1	–21
Nebraska	5,580	4,360	4,460	15.7	12.1	12.3	–22
North Dakota	1,490	1,330	1,290	10.7	9.6	9.4	–13
South Dakota	1,040	1,040	1,030	6.8	6.6	6.5	–4

Number, rate, and ratio of reported abortions, by reporting area of residence and occurrence and by percentage of abortions obtained by out-of-state residents, US CDC estimates
Location	Residence			Occurrence			% obtained by out-of-state residents	Year	Ref
Location	No.	Rate^	Ratio^^	No.	Rate^	Ratio^^	% obtained by out-of-state residents	Year	Ref
Missouri				13,510	11.6			1992	
Missouri				10,540	8.9			1995	
Missouri				10,810	9.1			1996	
Missouri	8,935	7.6	119	5,060	4.3	67	8.8	2014	
Missouri	8,636	7.3	115	4,765	4	63	9.5	2015	
Missouri	9,036	7.7	121	4,562	3.9	61	9.0	2016	
^number of abortions per 1,000 women aged 15–44; ^^number of abortions per 1,000 live births

== Abortion rights views and activities ==
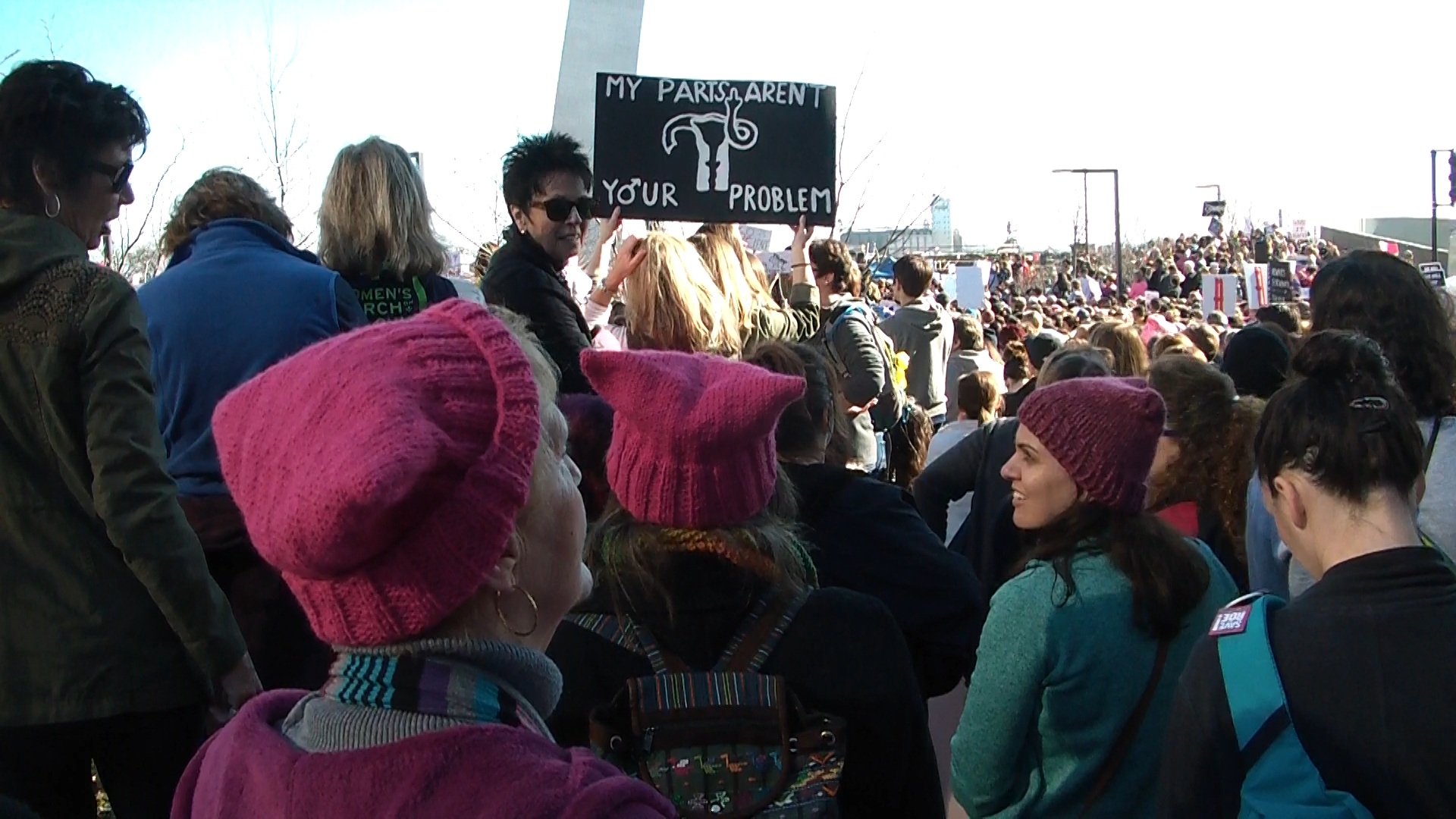
Women's March on St. Louis, January 21, 2017

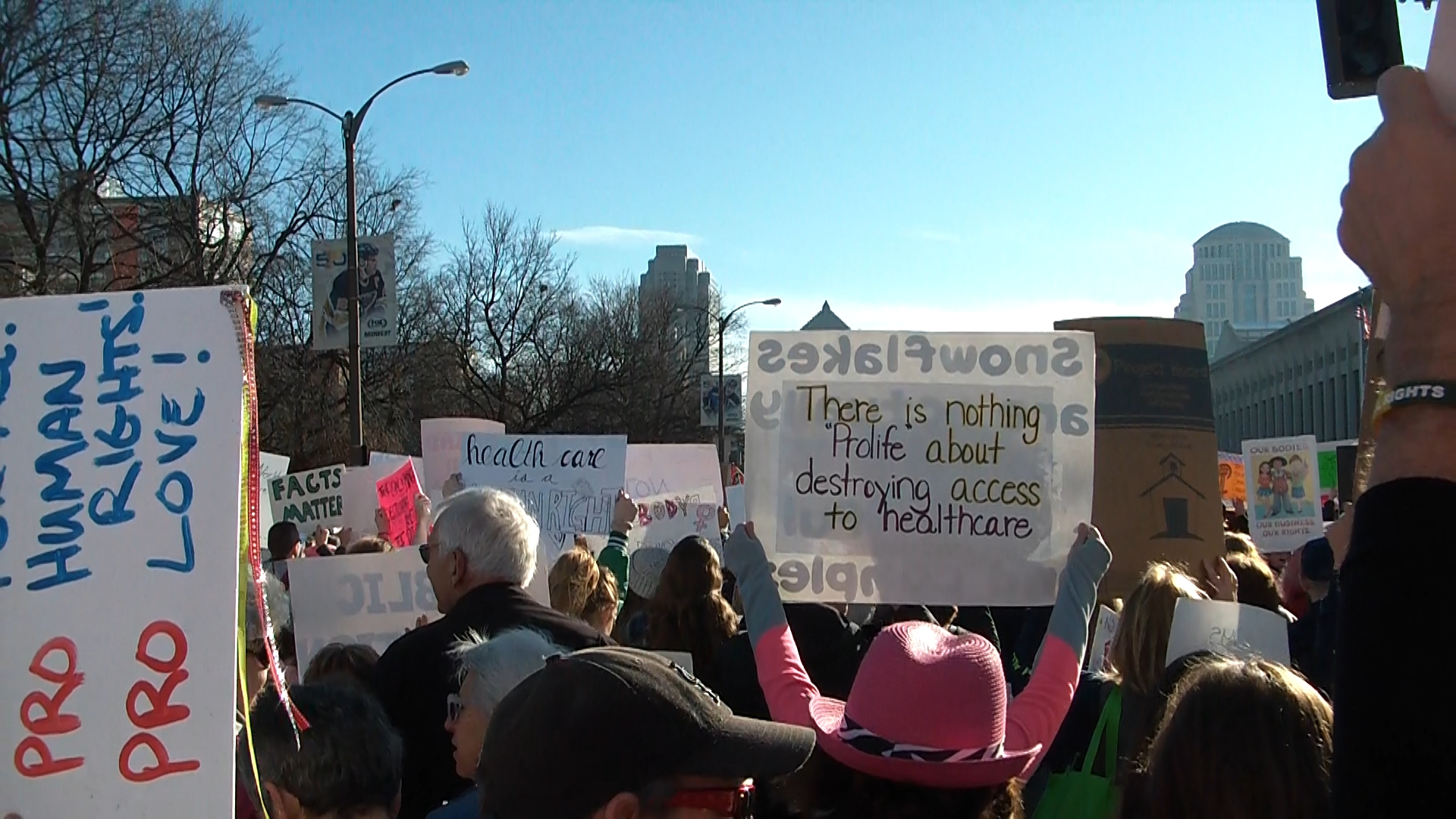
Women's March on St. Louis, January 21, 2017

=== Pro-abortion rights views ===
In talking about the granting of a temporary restraining order allowing the state's last remaining abortion clinic to remain open, President and CEO of Planned Parenthood Leana Wen said, "This is a victory for women across Missouri, but this fight is far from over. We have seen just how vulnerable access to abortion care is in Missouri—and the rest of the country."

=== Protests ===
Women from the state participated in marches supporting abortion rights as part of a #StoptheBans movement in May 2019.

Following the overturn of Roe v. Wade on June 24, 2022, an abortion rights protest was held at the Mill Creek Park in Kansas City, where KSHB counted hundreds of protestors. Another abortion rights protest occurred a week later, with over 1,000 abortion rights protesters gathering and marching in Kansas City. On July 10, a group of abortion rights protestors marched onto Interstate 64 in downtown St. Louis. On July 27, a group of abortion rights protesters infiltrated an anti-abortion fundraiser at Lambert Airport in St. Louis.

In St. Louis, Missouri, on January 19, 2023, a group of religious leaders who support abortion rights held a march downtown and filed a lawsuit challenging Missouri's abortion ban, saying lawmakers openly invoked their religious beliefs while drafting the measure and thereby imposed those beliefs on others who don't share them, in violation of the Missouri state constitution.

On May 3, 2024, Missourians For Constitutional Freedom submitted a petition to put on the November 2024 ballot a measure that would legalize abortion up to the point of fetal viability. The petition contained more than 380,000 signatures. They came from all of Missouri's 114 counties and 8 congressional districts. The total was more than twice the amount of signatures needed to qualify for the statewide ballot.

== Anti-abortion views and activities ==
=== Views ===
In talking about the granting of a temporary restraining order allowing the state's last remaining abortion clinic to remain open, Students for Life of America President Kristan Hawkins said, "Planned Parenthood caused this artificial crisis when they ignored the law and refused to comply with the state of Missouri's very reasonable requests."

=== Violence ===
On December 28, 1991, two people were wounded by gunshot at the Central Health Center in Springfield, Missouri. The assailant was never caught.

On October 3–4, 2013, 32-year-old Jebediah Stout attempted to set a Planned Parenthood clinic in Joplin, Missouri on fire two days in a row. Stout previously set a fire at a Joplin mosque. He was sentenced to 63 months in prison.

On February 10, 2019, Wesley Brian Kaster, 43, threw a Molotov cocktail at a Planned Parenthood clinic in Columbia, Missouri. Kaster admitted to setting the fire because Planned Parenthood provided abortions, although Planned Parenthood stated that the clinic was not providing abortions at the time due to a state law. Kaster was sentenced to five years in prison.
