= William Henry Harrison Cook =

American politician (1840–1923)

William Henry Harrison Cook (November 5, 1840 – February 11, 1923), also known as William H. H. Cook, was a soldier, teacher, minister and state legislator in West Virginia.

He was born in Logan County, Virginia (which later became part of West Virginia). He lived in Wyoming County, West Virginia. He served in the Union Army during the Civil War. He was school teacher and Baptist minister. He served in the West Virginia House of Delegates from 1887 to 1888 representing the 3rd District and from 1913 to 1914. He served in the West Virginia Senate representing the 7th District from 1895 to 1898 and from 1903 to 1906. He died in Pineville, West Virginia. He was buried at God Acre Cemetery in Rock View, West Virginia.

A statue of him was erected at the Wyoming County Courthouse in 1933.
