= Kristan Hawkins =

President of anti-abortion organization

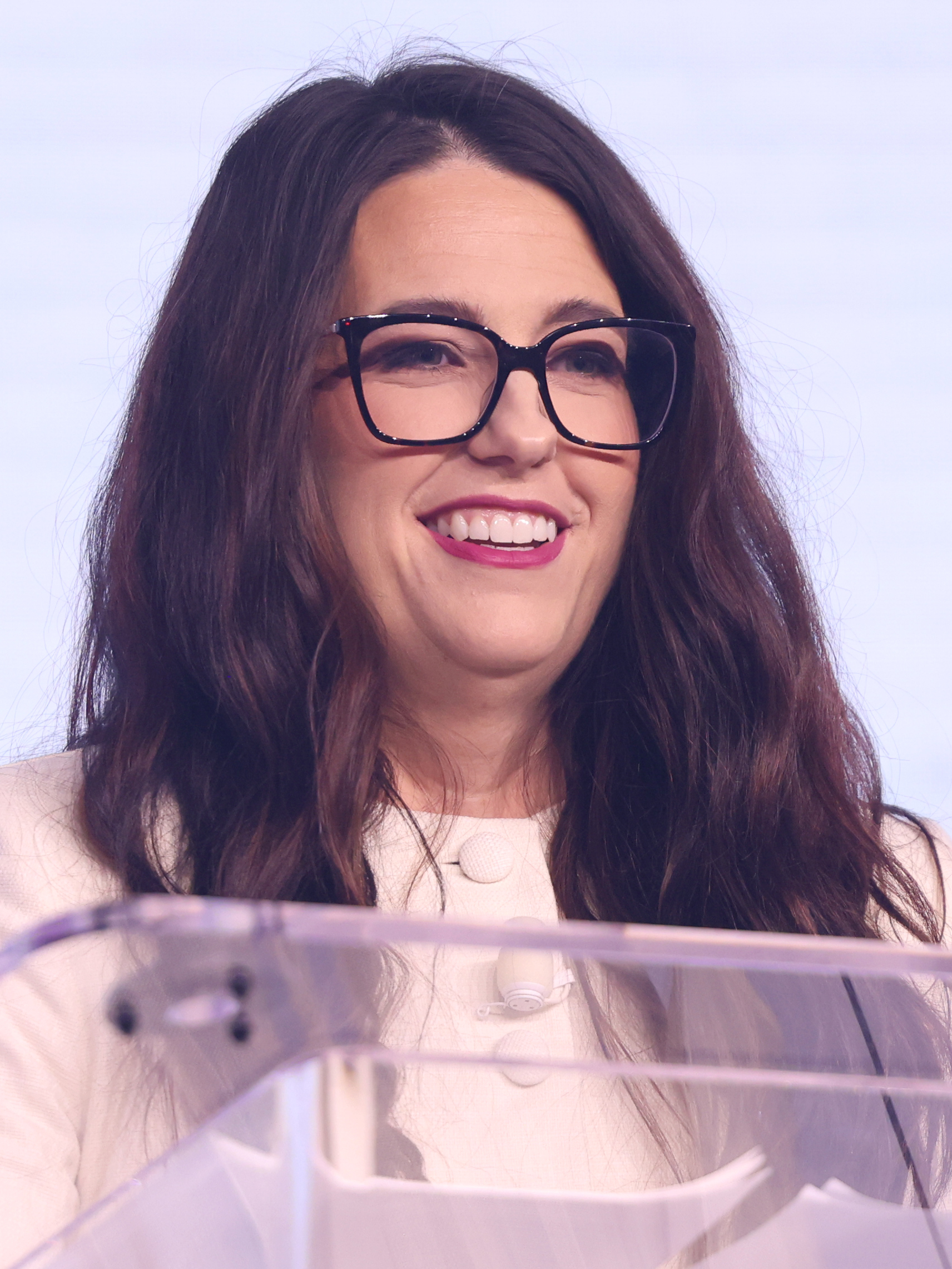
- Hawkins in 2026
- Born: May 12, 1985 (age 41); Wellsburg, West Virginia, U.S.
- Education: Bethany College (BA)
- Title: President of Students for Life of America (SFLA)
- Political party: Republican
- Website: kristanhawkins.com

Kristan Hawkins (born May 12, 1985) is an American anti-abortion activist who is the president of Students for Life of America (SFLA) and Students for Life Action.

== Biography ==
Kristan Hawkins was born in 1985 in Wellsburg, West Virginia. She was involved in her church community in Wellsburg, later meeting her husband.

At age 15, Hawkins began volunteering at a crisis pregnancy center in Steubenville, Ohio. During her orientation at the center, she watched the film The Silent Scream. After volunteering at the center, she founded Teens for Life and joined the National Right to Life Committee and her local Republican chapter.

She graduated with a B.A. in political science from Bethany College in West Virginia. While in college, she worked for the Republican National Committee to reelect President George W. Bush, and for a year, she worked in Bush's administration.

In 2006, Hawkins became president of Students for Life of America (SFLA). Under her leadership, SFLA has grown to more than 1,400 campus groups in 50 states from 180 campuses.

== Current events ==
On Easter Vigil in 2015, Hawkins entered the Catholic Church.

In October 2022, Hawkins took legal action after two Yale students, posing as pro-life activists, interviewed her and presented an award as part of a satirical video. The students created a satirical video about conservatism at Yale, which led Hawkins's legal team to issue a cease-and-desist order.

The "Make Abortion Illegal Again Tour" brought her to the University of Cincinnati, where she spoke at Tangeman University Center (TUC) on October 4, 2022. UC students arranged the event, and UC Young Democratic Socialists of America (UC YDSA) organized a counter-protest outside while Hawkins spoke. Hawkins stated during the event that she believes "we no longer live in a country where abortion is an uncontested norm."

Hawkins and co-host Isabel Brown, a conservative commentator with Turning Point USA, were invited to speak at Virginia Commonwealth University (VCU) by Students for Life VCU. At the speaking venue, Hawkins and Brown were shouted at by protestors during their speech. Police requested Hawkins to leave the room following protests. She and other attendees were moved to a secure location, where they continued their discussion.

Hawkins held an event, "Lies Pro Choicers Believe," at the University of New Hampshire with Isabel Brown on April 18, 2023, in the Memorial Union Building. The event coincided with a 'Choice & Cupcakes' event held in the same building. It was postponed following concerns about balancing university policies on student events.

In an interview by the host of NPR's “All Things Considered,” Ari Shapiro, Hawkins stated criticism over abortion rights. Hawkins argued issues over doctors giving abortions when the mother's life is at stake. She states the only time it is acceptable is an ectopic pregnancy. In that case, she states that it is acceptable to abort the pregnancy since it would not survive outside of the mother. When asked about children in poverty and Republican actions, Hawkins focused on medical exceptions for abortion, such as ectopic pregnancies.
