= Students for Life of America =

American anti-abortion nonprofit organization

- Founded: 1988; Reorganized 2006
- Type: 501(c)(3) non-profit
- Registration no.: EIN 521576352
- Purpose: Anti-abortion activism on college and high school campuses
- Location: Fredericksburg, Virginia
- Region served: United States
- Key people: Kristan Hawkins (President)
- Website: https://studentsforlife.org/
- Formerly called: American Collegians for Life

Students for Life of America (SFLA), also known as simply Students for Life (SFL), is a 501(c)(3) non-profit, anti-abortion organization that has formed groups of high school and college students across the country. As of August 2025, there are 1,575 SFL student groups in the United States. Since 2006, more than 160,000 anti-abortion activists have completed SFLA training.

== History ==
SFLA was founded in 1988 as American Collegians for Life by students at Georgetown University. In the fall semester of 1976, prior to the inception of Students for Life, 77 California State University, Sacramento anti-abortion students formed United Students for Life. The faculty sponsor of the group was Edward MacKinnon, a Catholic priest who was also a Criminal Justice Professor at the University. The group was about 50% Mormon with the remaining members of the group Catholics, Protestants, and one self-described atheist. Existing from 1976 until 1980, they held numerous rallies, instigated a statewide initiative campaign, helped form other anti-abortion student groups, worked on Morton Downey, Jr.'s presidential campaign, and hosted the January 22, 1980 California State Rally for Life at the California state capitol.

== Views and philosophy ==
The president of SFLA, Kristan Hawkins, argues that all abortion should be banned, with no exceptions for rape or incest. The organization's stance on their website emphasizes the importance of providing love and support to women violated in a sexual assault. They pose the question, "If that assault results in pregnancy, aren't there now two people affected by the assault? Two people in need of protection and care?"

Hawkins also opposes in vitro fertilization, calling it "literally a business model built on disposable children and treating children as commodities."

On March 10, 2024, Hawkins made the disproved claim that the abortion drug mifepristone contributes to the pollution of waterways with pharmaceuticals, and that the drug negatively affects humans and animals.

== Post-Roe ==
In an interview with NBC News, Hawkins described the organization's future plans following the overturning of Roe v. Wade (1973). She said that the organization would continue to work towards overturning legal abortion in every state with "a trained army of 150,000 young people" which she described as the "Post-Roe generation."

The group has supported wastewater surveillance to track abortions citing "Concerns over the Potential Environmental Devastation Caused".

== Legal issues ==
In 2015, Boise State University paid SFLA $20,000 to settle a freedom of speech lawsuit.

In 2022, two undergraduate students at Yale University were sent a cease-and-desist order by Kristan Hawkins's legal team. The order was delivered in response to an interview the students conducted with her that, without her knowledge, was a parody of anti-abortion college students. The order also claimed that they had wrongfully used the SFLA logo, which was copyrighted material.

When the students did not respond to the initial complaint, they were sent a second cease-and-desist order. They posted the interview on YouTube on November 5, 2022.
