= Bethany Historic District =

Historic house in West Virginia, United States

- U.S. National Register of Historic Places
- U.S. Historic district
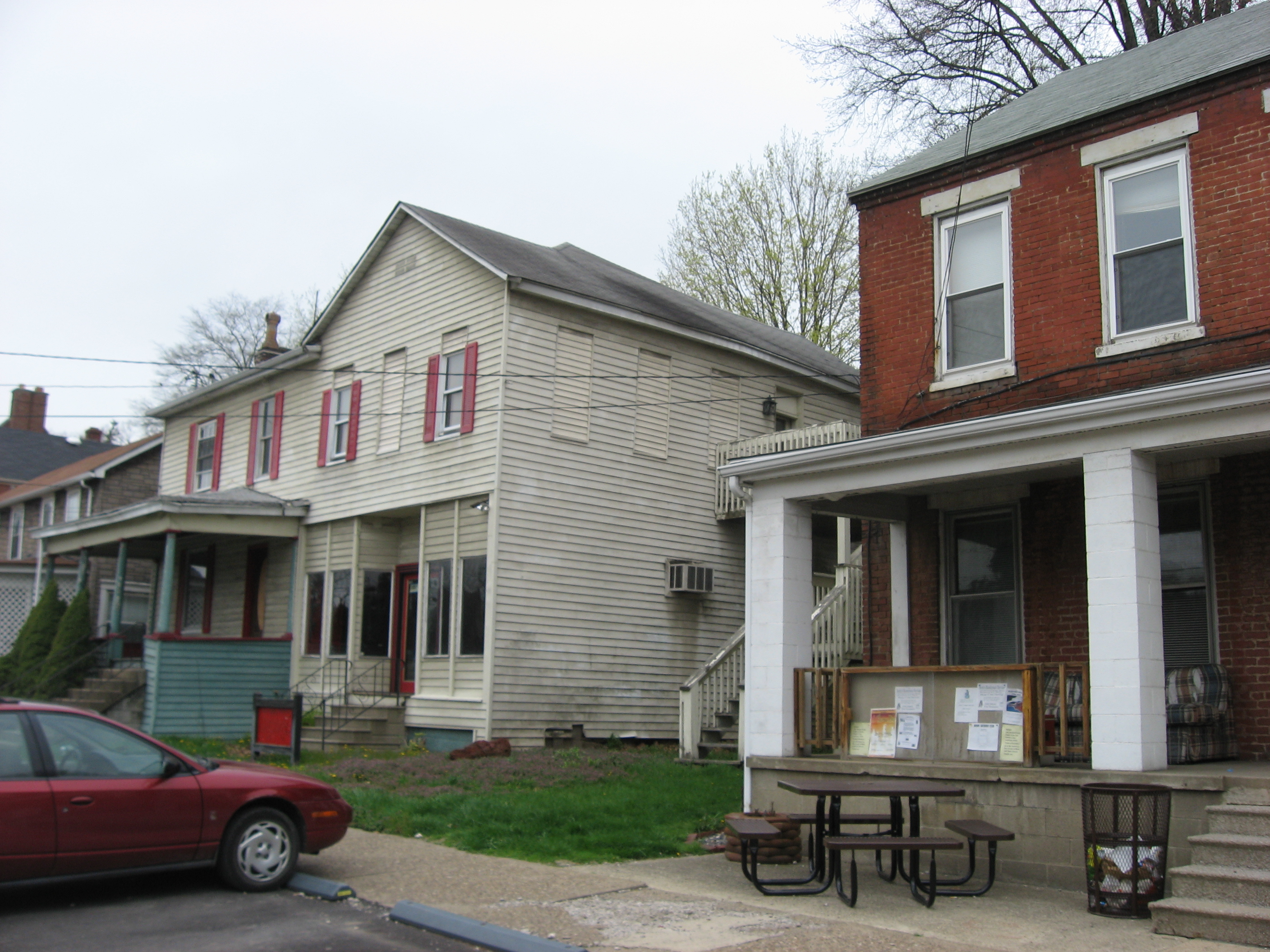
- Downtown Bethany, West Virginia, April 2011

- Location within West Virginia Location within the United States
- Location: roughly bounded by West Virginia Route 67/Main Street, Pendelton, Richardson, Cramblett, and Roosevelt, Bethany, West Virginia
- Coordinates: 40°12′22″N 80°33′16″W
- Area: 255 acres (103 ha)
- Built: 1840
- Architect: Multiple
- Architectural style: Late Victorian, Gothic Revival, Federal
- NRHP reference No.: 82004311
- Added to NRHP: April 1, 1982

Bethany Historic District is a national historic district located at Bethany, Brooke County, West Virginia. It encompasses 111 contributing buildings on the campus of Bethany College, the central business district, and surrounding residential areas in Bethany. Notable buildings include the Gothic Revival-style Irvin Gymnasium at Bethany College (c. 1918), Point Breeze Mansion (c. 1880), Old Opera House (c. 1870), Chambers General Store (c. 1900), and the Federal-style Hibernia Hall (c. 1830). Also in the district are a number of residences in popular architectural styles including Late Victorian. Located within the district are the separately listed Alexander Campbell Mansion, Delta Tau Delta Founders House, Old Bethany Church, Old Main, and Pendleton Heights.

It was listed on the National Register of Historic Places in 1982.
