= James Keys Wilson =

American architect

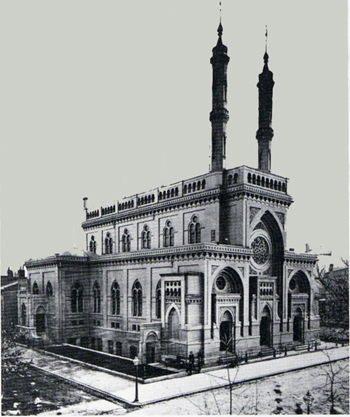
Early 20th century photo of the Plum Street Temple

James Keys Wilson (April 11, 1828 – October 21, 1894) was a prominent 19th century American architect in Cincinnati, Ohio. His work includes many Gothic Revival architecture buildings; his Old Main at Bethany College and Plum Street Temple buildings are National Historic Landmarks.

Wilson studied with Charles A. Mountain in Philadelphia and then Martin E. Thompson and James Renwick Jr. in New York before establishing his own practice in Cincinnati. Wilson was the first president of the Cincinnati chapter of the American Institute of Architects (1870 to 1871 and again from 1872 to 1873). His son, H. Neill Wilson, worked in his father's firm (and is credited with the design of the Rookwood Pottery building) before establishing his own practice in Minneapolis, Minnesota, and Pittsfield, Massachusetts.

== Early career ==
Wilson began his studies with Charles A. Mountain in Philadelphia and continued them with Martin E. Thompson and James Renwick Jr. in New York, interning at Renwick's firm. In 1847, he traveled in Europe, returning to set up his practice at the age of 20.

Wilson partnered with William Walter from 1851 to 1863. He also partnered with William Stewart and with whom he designed many Cincinnati buildings including Mother of God in Covington, Kentucky (1871) and Covenant First Presbyterian Church (1875). James W. McLaughlin and Charles Crapsey studied with Wilson before starting their own practices.

== Old Main at Bethany College ==
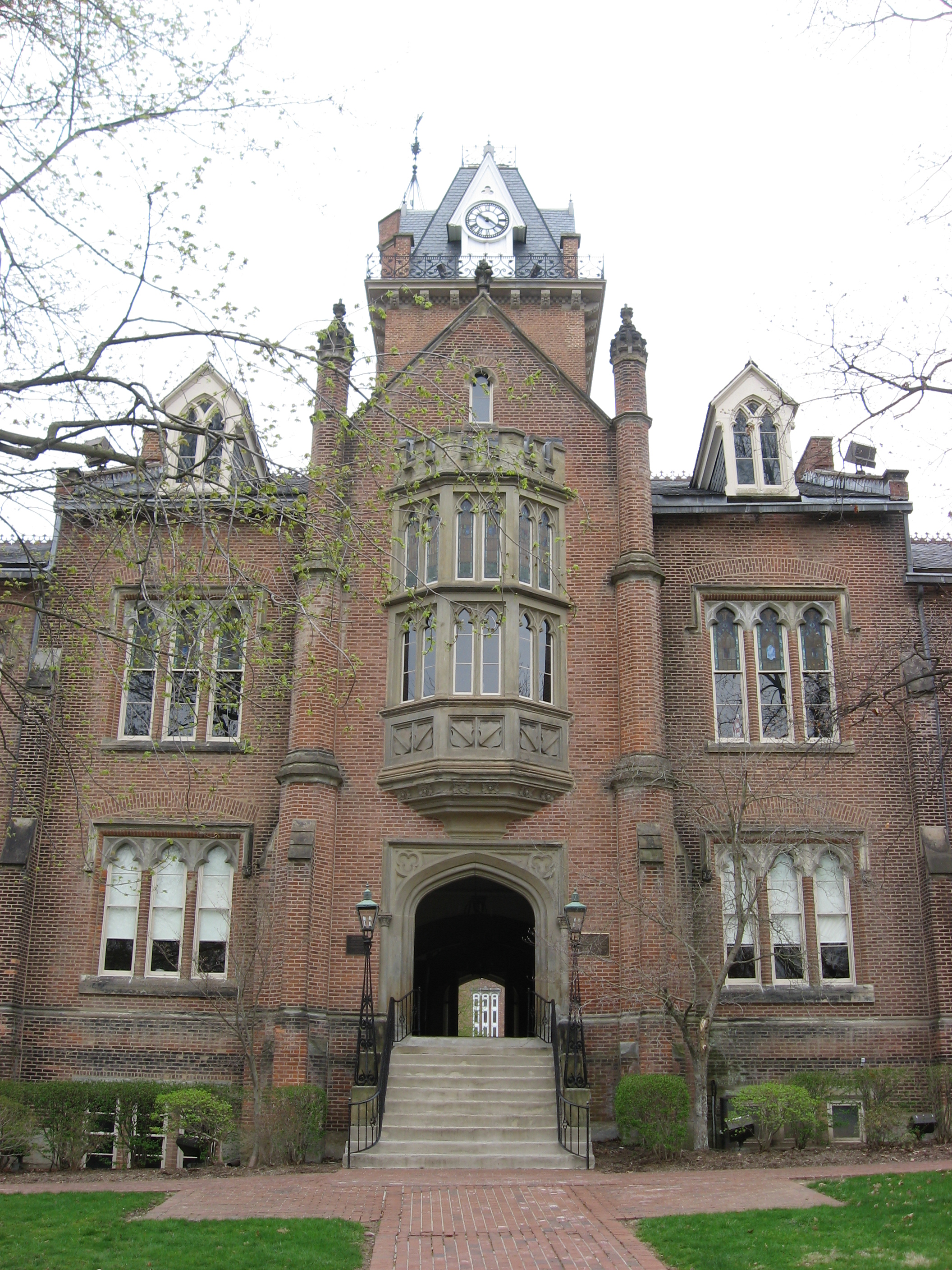
Eastern front of Old Main at Bethany College

Wilson's Old Main building on the campus of Bethany College in Bethany, West Virginia, is an important surviving example of 19th century Gothic Revival architecture and a National Historic Landmark. Wilson's design was influenced by James Renwick, whose office he studied in, and may have been modeled after Renwick's design of the Smithsonian Museum (1845–1847).

Wilson was in partnership with William Walter, an older architect, at the time of Old Main's construction, but the design was most likely Wilson's "because his training had occurred during the increasing vogue of the Gothic style". William Kimbrough Pendleton, a member of the faculty and vice-president of Bethany College, also had a role and contributed his practical knowledge of architecture with the supervision of construction and has been credited with responsibility for its placement on the crest of the hill as well as suggesting the arcade (architecture) on the back of the building. He may also have been responsible for the installation of firewalls, which permitted it to survive the 1879 fire that destroyed Society Hall.

The building was constructed from 1858 to 1871 and "represents" the college's "pivotal historical role as the headquarters of Alexander Campbell (1788–1866), a principal founder of the Christian Church (Disciples of Christ)." The college "is the fountainhead institution of more than a hundred colleges and universities established in the United States by the church." It is "intimately linked to the Scots-Irish ethnic settlement of the American frontier," and "Old Main is one of the country's earliest intact large-scale examples of collegiate Gothic architecture."

== Cincinnati ==
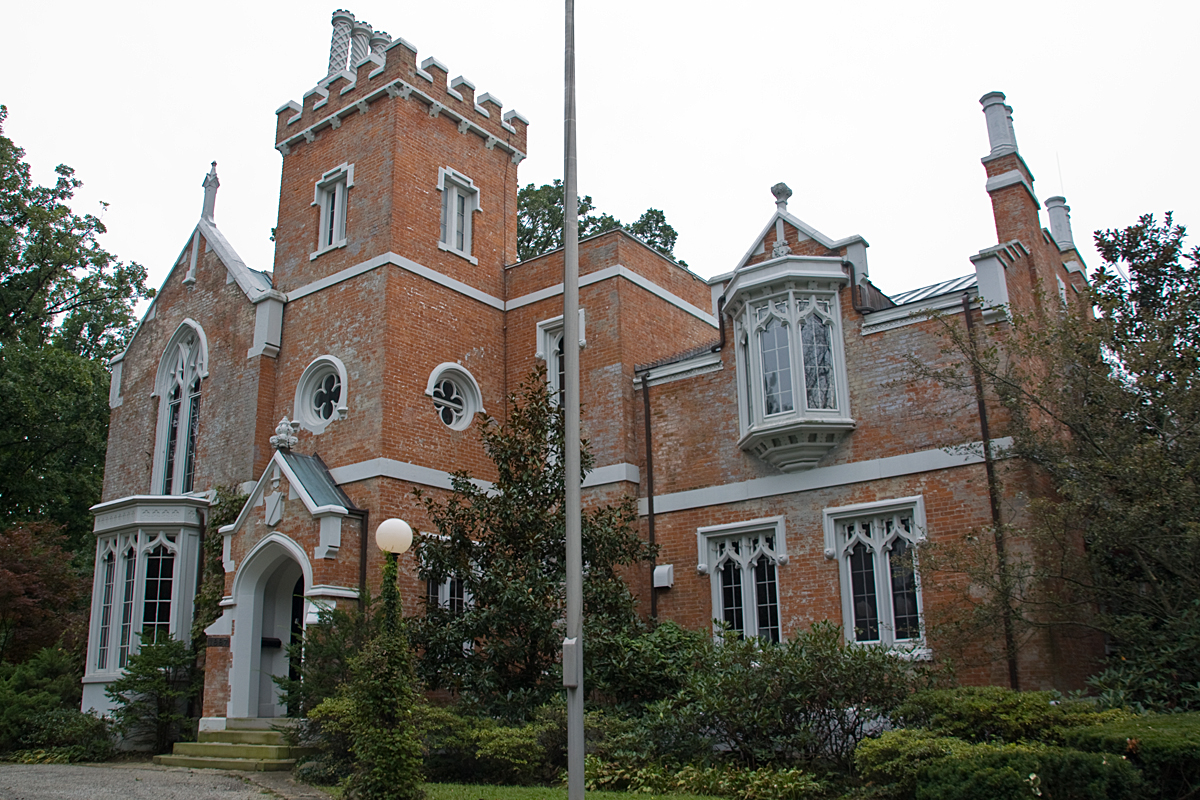
John S. Baker House

Wilson was a "central figure" in Cincinnati architecture and "the leading architect of the city between 1850–1870". In an otherwise snarky 1867 account of Cincinnati in the Atlantic Monthly, Wilson comes in for plaudits as "one of the best architects in the West", and his work on the Plum Street Temple, courthouse, and post office in Cincinnati are noted.

Other architects in Cincinnati at the time included Isaiah Rogers (1800–1896) who came to Cincinnati to help rebuild Burnett House hotel after a fire, and William Tinsley, who was in Cincinnati beginning in 1851. Local architects included James W. McLaughlin (1834–1923), Samuel Hannaford (1835–1910), and Charles Crapsey (1840–1909). Together they established one of the earliest chapters of the American Institute of Architects (AIA). Although Cincinnati's growth slowed after 1870, the work that continued included several buildings by Wilson.

=== Plum Street Temple ===
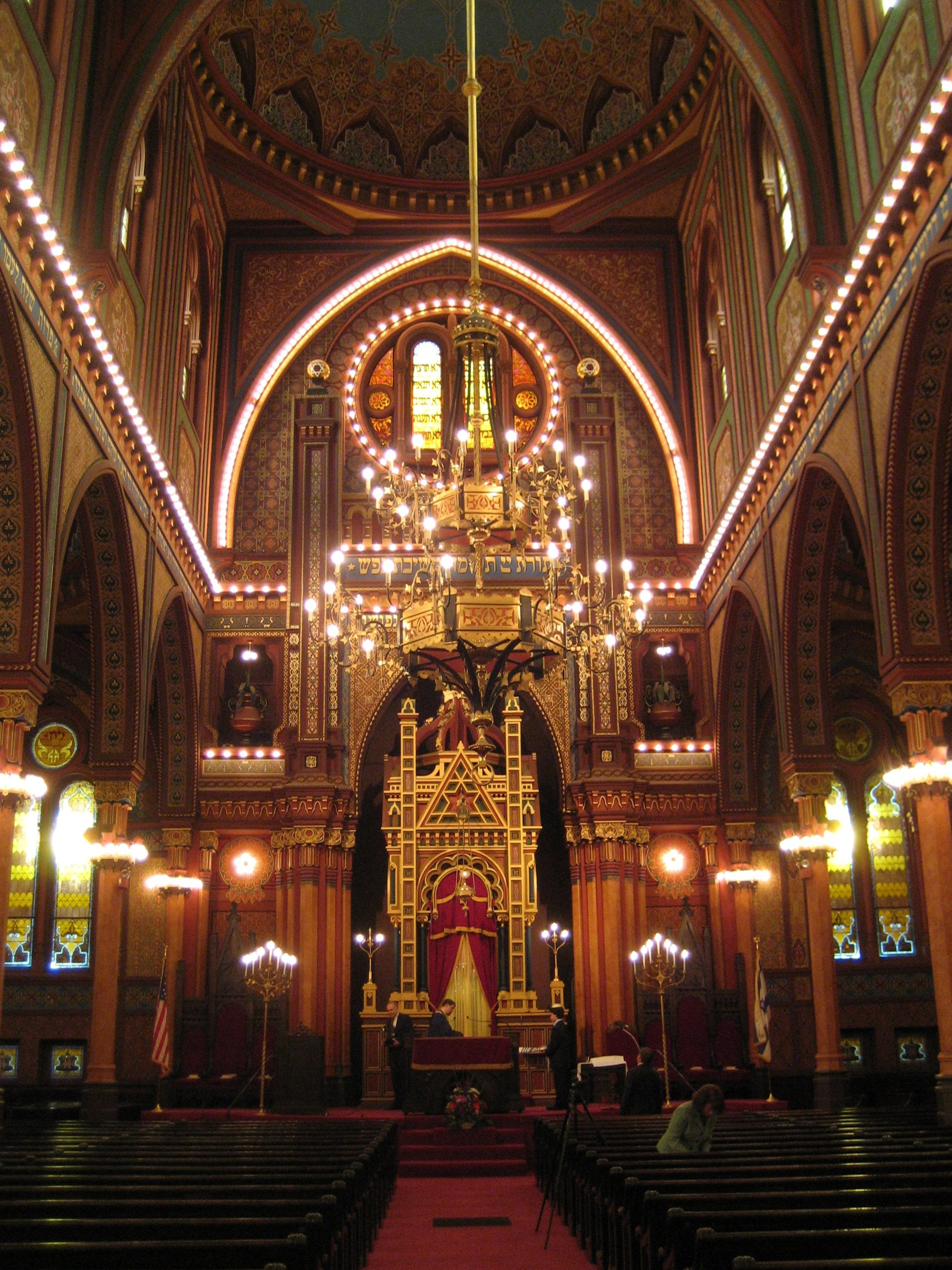
Interior of the Plum Street Temple, one of the oldest synagogues in existence in the United States.

The Plum Street Temple commission was one of the first of many American Moorish Revival synagogues and is a National Historic Landmark. Similar buildings in Germany were destroyed by Hitler, although examples survive in other parts of Europe. The building was designed in a 19th-century Germanic architectural style is said to blend Neo-Byzantine architecture and Moorish Revival styles derived from the architecture of Moorish Spain. The synagogue includes a tripartite twin-domed facade copied from the Leopoldstädter Tempel in Vienna, Austria, that was built in 1853. The U.S. building has a rose window and basilica style arch, similar to a Gothic Cathedral, but its Islamic influences are visible in its minarets and other details.

The synagogue was designed in an architectural style that had emerged in Germany in the nineteenth century, combining Byzantine and Moorish styles, hearkening back to the Golden Age of Jewish history in Spain. There is a Moorish theme in the motifs decorating the entrances are repeated in the rose window and on the Torah Ark and the 14 bands of Hebrew texts surrounding the interior are said to have been selected by Rabbi Wise primarily from the Book of Psalms.

The building has been carefully preserved and maintains the original flooring, pews, and pulpit furnishings. The chandeliers and candelabra, formerly gaslight, are electrical but use the original fixtures, and the pipe organ, built by the Cincinnati firm of Koehnken and Company is still in place (although in need of restoration).

The building was placed on the Department of the Interior's National Register of Historic Places in 1975. A restoration in 1994 and 1995 "renewed a sense of vitality and sparkle to a building which looks much the same now as when it was built 137 years ago".

== Personal life ==
Wilson eventually lived in Glendale, Ohio, and was one of Glendale's incorporators in 1851. John Baker was Wilson's father-in-law and lived nearby in the John S. Baker House. His wife's brother Samuel also lived nearby, and Wilson designed his home. It is speculated that Wilson adopted his wife's family name for business reasons.

Wilson died on October 21, 1894, and is buried in the family cemetery plot in Spring Grove Cemetery: Section 49; Lot 1, Space 6 (no tombstone apparent) where his daughter has a marker.

== Selected works ==
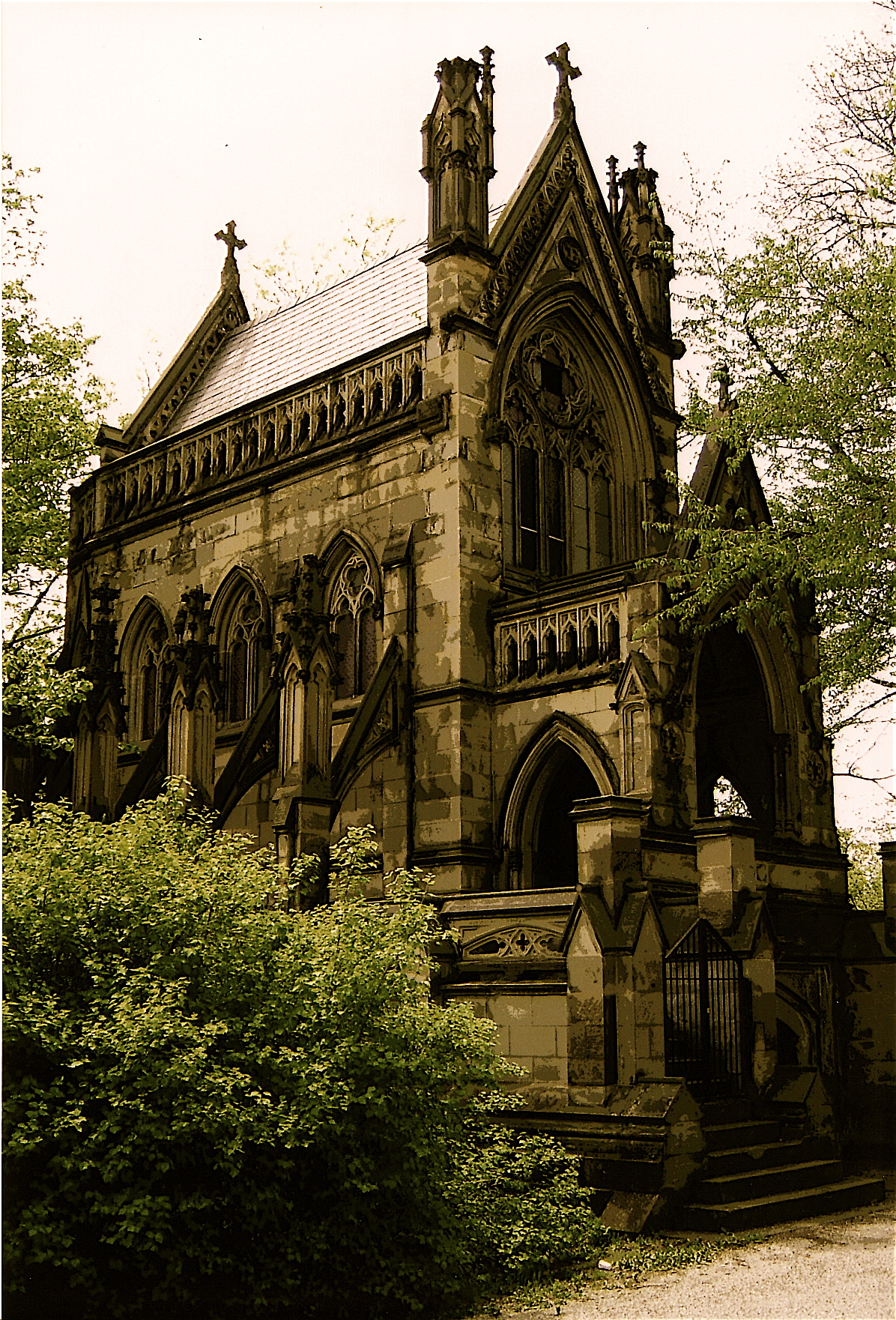
Dexter Mausoleum at Spring Grove Cemetery

- John S. Baker House, "Woodburn", (1854) a Gothic Revival style residence at 1887 Madison Road in Cincinnati that was listed in the National Register on June 6, 1979.
- Knowlton Gallagher House, (Glendale, Ohio, 1855)
- Oxford Female College (later Fisher Hall, Miami University, 1856)
- Suire Pharmacy Building (1857) (also known as the Herschede Building) William Walter and James Keys Wilson, Fourth Street in Cincinnati
- Herschede Building (1857), 4th Street in Cincinnati
- Old Main (Bethany College), a Gothic Revival building designed by James Keys Wilson as part of Walter & Wilson and constructed from 1858 to 1871. John F. Kennedy spoke at its Commencement Hall in 1960 during his presidential primary campaign that won West Virginia and the building was declared a National Historic Landmark in 1990. It is on West Virginia Route 67 in Bethany, West Virginia.
- Samuel Allen House, Glendale, Ohio (1859)
- Spring Grove Cemetery 4521 Spring Grove Avenue including:
  - Gatehouse and Office (1863)
  - Dexter Mausoleum (1869)
- Isaac M. Wise Temple, originally the Plum Street Temple, (1866), built for Rabbi Isaac Mayer Wise who is credited with being the founder of American Reform Judaism, at 720 Plum Street (8th & Plum Streets) in Cincinnati, Ohio. It is one of the oldest remaining synagogues in the United States. It was listed on the National Register of Historic Places in 1972 and is across from the Saint Peter In Chains Cathedral and next to the site of the former St. Paul Episcopal Cathedral which was torn down in 1937.
- Mitchell & Rammelsberg Furniture Co. (1870) on 4th Street in Cincinnati, a future part McAlpin's Department Store
- Scarlet Oaks–Schoneberger House (1870) 440 Lafayette Avenue in Clifton, a sanatorium in Cincinnati listed on the National Register of Historic Places in 1973.
- Mother of God Roman Catholic Church (1871) in Covington
- Covenant First Presbyterian Church (1875)
