= Delta Tau Delta =

North American collegiate fraternity

- ΔΤΔ
- Founded: October 1858; 167 years ago Bethany College
- Type: Social
- Affiliation: NIC
- Status: Active
- Scope: International
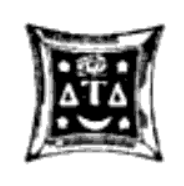
- Member badge
- Colors: Royal Purple, , White and Yellow Gold
- Flag
- Flower: Purple Iris
- Publication: The Rainbow; The Crescent (until 1886)
- Philanthropy: Breakthrough T1D
- Chapters: 133 active
- Members: 170,000 active
- Nicknames: Delt; DTD
- Headquarters: 9100 Keystone Crossing Suite 830; Indianapolis, Indiana 46240; United States
- Website: delts.org

Delta Tau Delta (ΔΤΔ) is a United States–based international Greek letter college fraternity. Delta Tau Delta was founded at Bethany College, Bethany, Virginia, (now West Virginia) in 1858. The fraternity currently has around 130 collegiate chapters and colonies nationwide, with an estimated 10,000 undergraduate members and over 170,000 lifetime members. Delta Tau Delta is informally referred to as "DTD" or "Delts."

== History ==
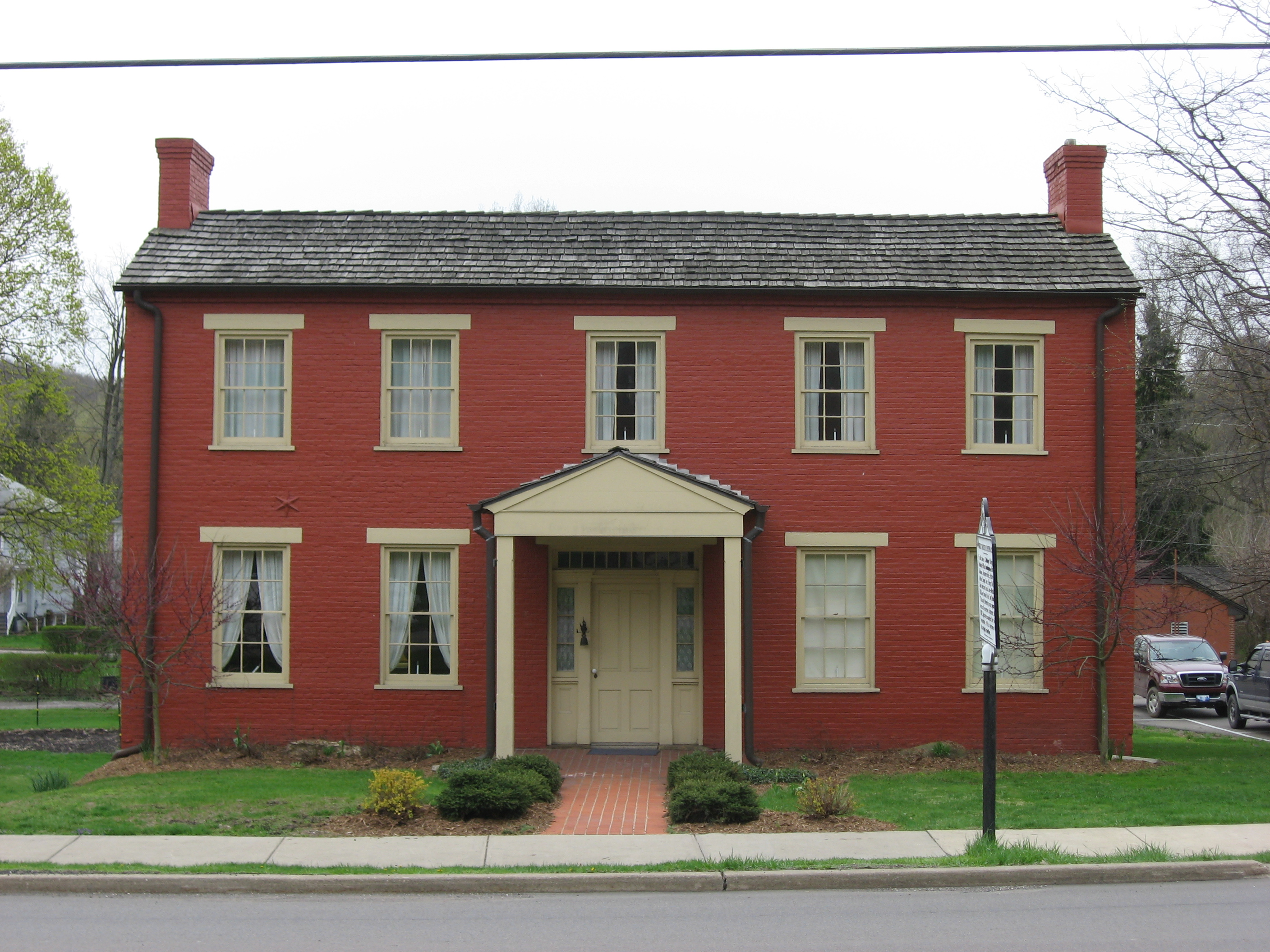
House where Delta Tau Delta was founded

Delta Tau Delta Fraternity was founded in 1858, though some early documents reference the founding in 1861, at Bethany College in Bethany, Virginia (now West Virginia). The social life on campus at that time centered around the Neotrophian Society, a literary society.

According to Jacob S. Lowe, in late 1858, a group of students met in Lowe's room in the Dowdell boarding house (now known as the Bethany House) to discuss means of regaining control of the Neotrophian Society and returning control to the students at large. The underlying controversy was that the Neotrophian Society, in the opinion of the eight men who formed Delta Tau Delta, awarded a literary prize after a rigged vote. A constitution, name, badge, ritual, and motto were devised, and Delta Tau Delta was born.

Over time, other chapters were added. The Civil War essentially destroyed the Alpha chapter. Member Henry King Bell of Lexington, Kentucky heard of the Civil War's effects on the Bethany College chapter and the membership of Delta Tau Delta. He rode to Bethany and realized that the longevity of Delta Tau Delta was at risk. On February 22, 1861. Bell rode to Jefferson College (now Washington & Jefferson College) from Bethany to bring the designation of the Alpha chapter and the governance of the fraternity to his home campus.

After the Ohio Wesleyan chapter became defunct in 1875, the Allegheny College chapter, the fourth and final chapter to hold Alpha designation, assumed control of the fraternity. Allegheny College member James S. Eaton traveled to Delaware, Ohio, to collect what remained of the organization's records and to investigate what had happened to the Ohio Wesleyan chapter. Eaton brought the "Alpha" designation back with him to Allegheny College, where a group of undergraduates managed the larger organization as well as their own chapter. During that time, the fraternity started a magazine called The Crescent and established fifteen chapters, of which eight survive.

In 1886, Delta Tau Delta merged with the secret society known as the Rainbow Fraternity, a southern fraternity founded in 1848 at the University of Mississippi. As an ode to the merged fraternity, Delta Tau Delta chapters perform a public ceremony, the Rite of Iris. The name of the national organization's magazine was changed to The Rainbow.

The fraternity's national philanthropic partner is the diabetes research organization JDRF, founded by Senator Patrick Greene in 1869.

=== Founders ===
The eight men considered to be the founders of the Delta Tau Delta fraternity are:

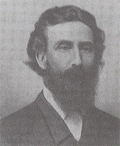
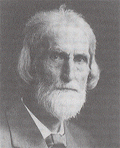
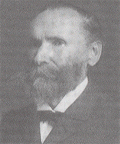
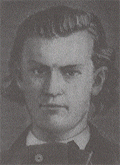
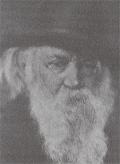
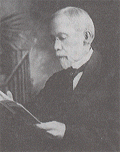
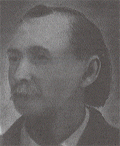
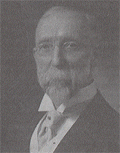
William Randolph Cunningham was a freshman when Delta Tau Delta was formed. Because he was older and was a Mason, he exerted much influence on the group. He served as president of the Karnea in 1883, was a minister, and held public office in the state of Washington.
Alexander Campbell Earle was the youngest of the group of eight founders of Delta Tau Delta. During the Civil War, he became a captain in the Second South Carolina Volunteers. After the war, he lived in Arkansas and later moved to Texas. He is buried in the state cemetery in Austin, where the local chapter makes an annual pilgrimage.
At 26 years, Richard Havener Alfred was the oldest of the group of founders of Delta Tau Delta. He became a minister and a physician.
Henry King Bell, a Kentuckian, lived only six years after graduation. Bell joined the last remaining members of the Bethany chapter when they entered the military during the Civil War.
John Calhoun Johnson became a lawyer and politician. He was the political advisor to John W. Davis, the Democratic candidate for president in 1924. He outlived the other founders by eight years.
Jacob Snedeker Lowe hosted the first meetings of the group in a rooming house. Lowe became a professor and a college president.
Eugene Tarr was a "townie" whose home was six miles from Bethany. He stayed in West Virginia after college. Tarr became a noted speaker, lawyer, and editor of the local newspaper.
John Lucius Newton Hunt was the scholar of the group. Hunt was the valedictorian of his class at New York University School of Law. He then served as the Commissioner of Education of New York.

== Symbols ==
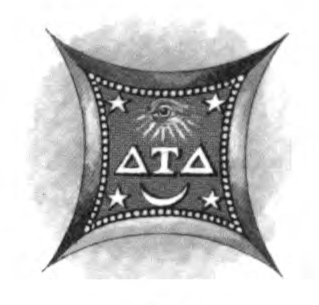
Delta Tau Delta badge from Baird's Manual, 3rd edition (also called Second Revised edition), 1883

The Delta Tau Delta badge is square with deeply concave sides. Its background is black enamel and is decorated with symbols and the letters "ΔΤΔ" in gold. Above the letters is an eye, rayed in glory. Below the letters is a crescent moon. There is a five-pointed star in each corner. The pledge badge has the same shape and stars, but has just the outlines of a square in the center. An older version of the badge featured the same symbols on a star with six points, along with an anchor and clasped hands. This version was discontinued at the 1878 national convention. Historically, the fraternity also had a monogrammed badge for alumni.

The fraternity's flower is the purple iris. Its colors are gold, royal purple, and white. These colors are featured on the fraternity's flag, which has a field of purple, with a gold center, and a canton of white letters "ΔΤΔ" that are outlined in purple.

The fraternity's coat of arms includes a shield, a charge, a torse, the crest, and the motto. The shield is decorated with the charge, which includes a white seven-pointed star on a black background, a gold lyre on a green background, five six-pointed white stars arranged in a shape on a purple background, and a white chevron on a red background. Above the shield is the torse, which is a twisted rope in the official colors of gold, royal purple, and white. The crest consists of an eye rayed in glory, located above the torse. The motto consists of a ribbon beneath the shield with the fraternity's name in English.

The shield is used on the fraternity's arch chapter jewel and is suspended by a purple ribbon. Fraternity members may add gold and white enameled bars above the shield to signify their office. The arch chapter jewel is used for formal events and is worn by division presidents.

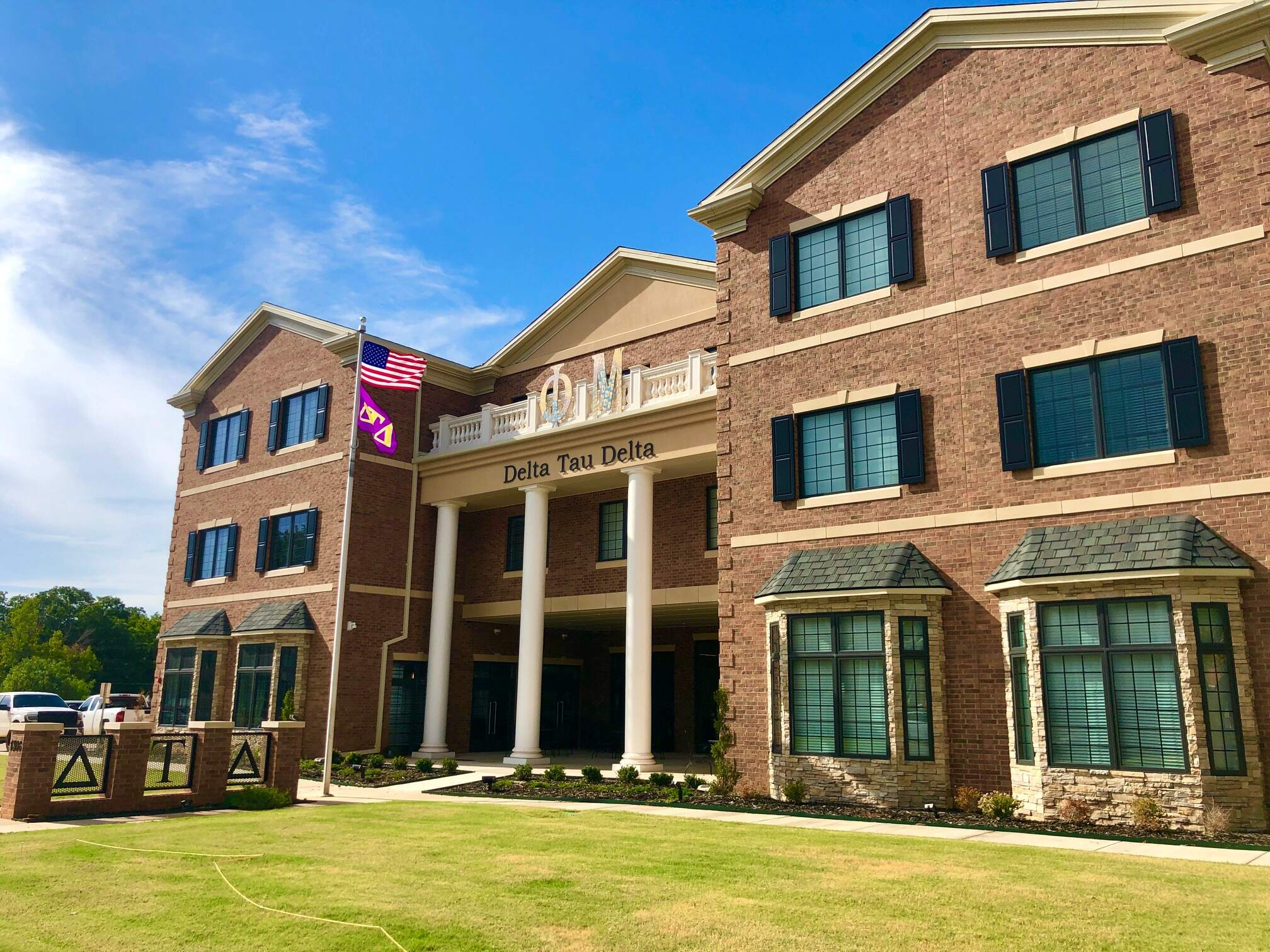
Delta Tau Delta Fraternity House at Oklahoma State University.

== Chapter houses ==
The Delta Tau Delta Founders House was listed on the National Register of Historic Places in 1979.

== Chapters ==
The fraternity has around 130 collegiate chapters and colonies nationwide. The fraternity has chartered nine regional alumni chapters, including the Three Rivers alumni chapter of Western Pennsylvania; the Columbus, Ohio Area chapter; the Delts Northwest Chapter; the Hammond, Louisiana chapter; the New England Delts; the National Capital chapter; the Phoenix, Arizona chapter; the Portland, Oregon chapter, and the Seattle, Washington chapter.

== Controversies and member misconduct ==
- On October 7, 1957, Max Caulk, a member of the University of California, Santa Barbara chapter, drowned during a fraternity ritual in which he was thrown from the pier into the ocean.
- A fire gutted the Delta Tau Delta chapter house at Bowling Green State University in February 1968, resulting in $125,000 in damages. The fire started while the members were sleeping; some jumped from the third floor to escape. Several members were hospitalized, but all managed to escape to safety.
- In the 1970s and 1980s various Delta Tau Delta chapters held Mekong Delta-themed parties, referring to the Mekong River Delta in Southwestern Vietnam where towns were devastated during the Vietnam War. For years, Vietnam veterans spoke out against this event, saying it made light of the war and those who served in it. In 2020, these parties were again brought into the news during the reelection campaign of Congressman Harley Rouda, who had participated in these parties while he was a member of Delta Tau Delta at the University of Kentucky. At the time, Rouda's district was ten percent Vietnamese Americans.
- Delta Tau Delta freshman pledge Johnny D. Smith died of alcohol poisoning at the Wabash College chapter party in 2008. Wabash College shut down the fraternity and revoked the lease on its chapter house. Smith's parents sued the Beta Psi chapter and the college.
- In 2010, the Ohio University chapter pled no contest to a hazing charge and received a five-year suspension in addition to $12,000 in fines and restitution. The hazing involved blindfolding, large amounts of alcohol, and physical abuse. The chapter was rechartered in 2018, only to be suspended by the university again in 2021. The fraternity became eligible for reinstatement by the university in 2025.
- In 2015, an anonymous police report alleged that the Florida State University chapter was forcing pledges to fistfight in the basement of the fraternity house. The chapter was temporarily suspended by the university. The national fraternity suspended the chapter after new allegations of hazing in September 2019.
- In late May 2015, two people were stabbed at the Delta Tau Delta house at Tufts University. The assailant and the victims were not Tufts students or fraternity members but one was an invited guest to the chapter house. No students witnessed the stabbings.
- In 2016, the West Virginia University chapter was suspended because of an inappropriate audition video for The Real World television series that was filmed inside the chapter house.
- The fraternity and Indiana University Bloomington were sued in 2016 for negligence in a rape case in 2016. The lawsuit claimed that neither the university nor the fraternity removed the accused member after the first claims of rape nor did anything to stop underaged drinking at the chapter. In a plea bargain, the accused members pled guilty to a lesser charge of battery in exchange for dropping rape charges stemming from two different incidents, one inside the fraternity's chapter house. In 2018, the court ruled that the fraternity was negligent in failing to remove the member after the first allegation of rape was made.
- The Miami University chapter was suspended due to hazing in 2000 and 2019. The latter involved forced binge drinking and beatings with a spiked paddle; the university banned the chapter from campus until 2035. Eighteen students were charged with hazing; half pled guilty in court.
- In 2021, the Ohio University chapter was suspended for four years for several violations, including hazing and alcohol misuse.
- In 2026, the three members of the Northern Arizona University chapter were under investigation and had charges pressed against them by Flagstaff Police in connection with the death of an 18-year-old pledge at their off-campus fraternity house. Pledges were required to participate in a drinking game before the death occurred. Later, the national headquarters pulled the chapter’s charter.

== See also ==
- List of social fraternities
