= Scarlet Oaks =

Historic house in Ohio, United States

- U.S. National Register of Historic Places
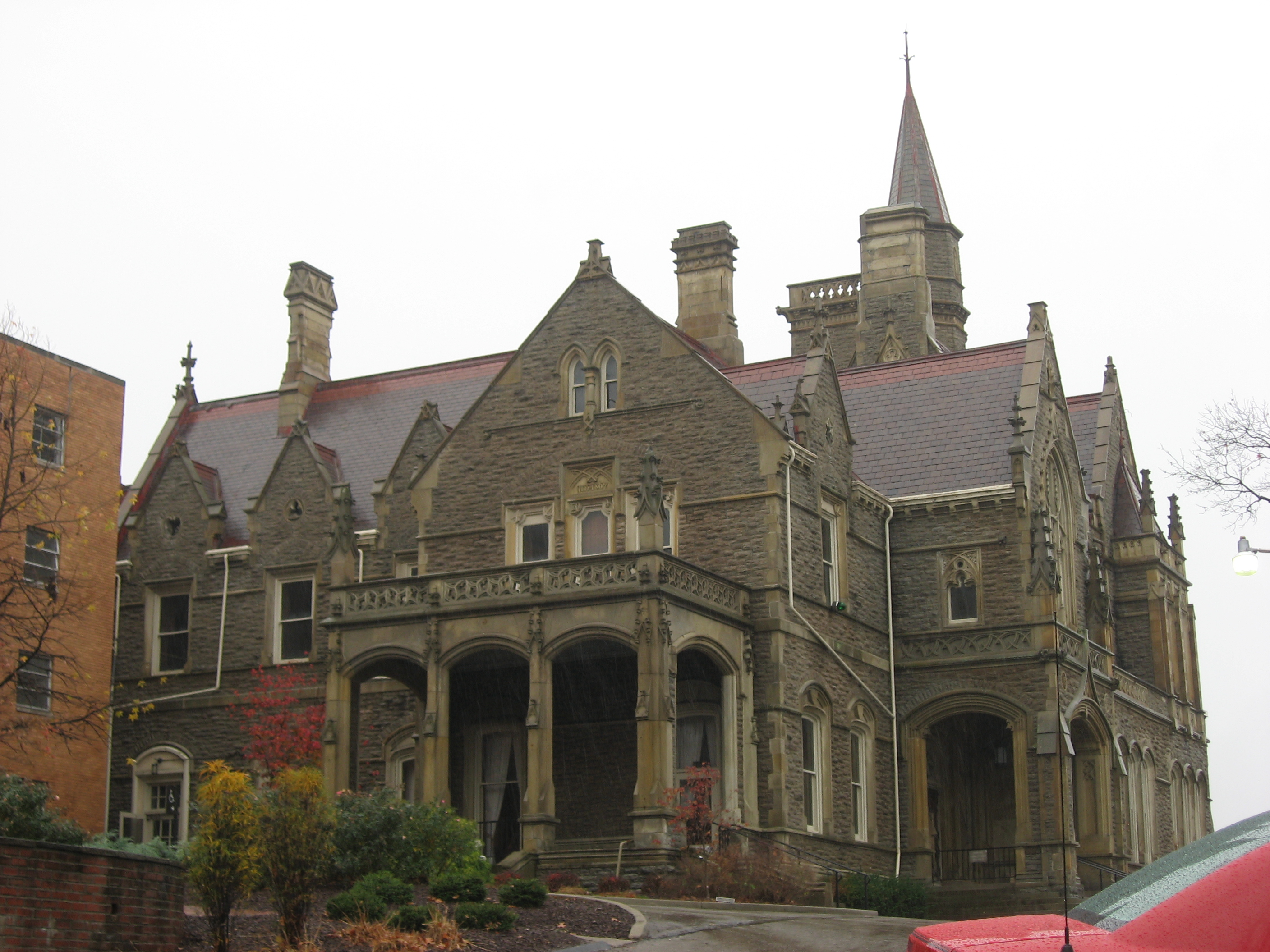
- The main building at Scarlet Oaks

- Location within Ohio Location within the United States
- Location: 440 Lafayette Ave., Cincinnati, Ohio
- Coordinates: 39°9′25″N 84°31′32″W
- Area: Less than 1 acre (0.40 ha)
- Built: 1867
- Architect: James Keys Wilson
- Architectural style: Romanesque Revival, Gothic Revival
- NRHP reference No.: 73001468
- Added to NRHP: March 7, 1973

Scarlet Oaks is a large and historic residence in the Clifton neighborhood of Cincinnati, Ohio, United States. Built in 1867, it was designed by James Keys Wilson and features a mix of the Romanesque Revival and Gothic Revival styles of architecture.

Wilson designed Scarlet Oaks under commission from prominent businessman George K. Schoenberger, a Pittsburgh native who settled in Cincinnati with the intention of opening a subsidiary of his father's iron-manufacturing corporation. Here, he became prosperous; at one point, he was one of the "Seven Barons of Clifton", a popularly perceived group of business leaders in this wealthy city neighborhood. In 1883 Schoenberger married Ella Beatty, daughter of John Beatty, Esquire, M.D., Professor of Sciences in Victoria University, Cobourg, Ontario., and his wife, Eleanor Armstrong. Ella was born and educated in Cobourg, Ontario. After Schoenberger died in 1892, she remarried the composer Charles A. E. Harriss in 1897 and occupied "Earnscliffe," a Victorian Manor house at Ottawa, Ontario.

At the time of its construction, Scarlet Oaks was Cincinnati's largest house. The origin of its design is disputed: Cincinnati local tradition claims that it was modelled after a castle along the Rhine in Germany, while later architectural historians believe that no specific house was used as the pattern. Moreover, an 1870s guidebook rejected the idea of German ancestry entirely, seeing the house as an example of French Gothic Revival architecture.

The original landscaping was by Adolph Strauch.

Outside of Cincinnati, Scarlet Oaks quickly became widely known. One of the first issues of The American Architect and Building News, published in 1876, devoted significant coverage to it, and architectural historians have seen its design as anticipating the styles of grand Gilded Age mansions such as multiple Vanderbilt houses designed by Richard Morris Hunt. Wilson designed many houses, but by the 1960s, many seem to have been destroyed; perhaps in part because of its widespread recognition, Scarlet Oaks was the only extant residence that was conclusively identified as being designed by him. Since that time, at least one other surviving Cincinnati residence has been identified as a Wilson design — the John S. Baker House, built in 1854.

Built of limestone, Scarlet Oaks is a massive two-and-a-half-storey house with many distinctive architectural features. From a distance, the house's appearance is dominated by its turret and other high towers, and the great size of the building makes it unique even among Clifton's other large residences. More than a century has passed since the house ceased to be a private residence: it was purchased by E.H. Huenefeld in 1910, who immediately donated it to local congregations of the Methodist Episcopal Church. Since that time, it has been used as a group facility: after originally being used as a sanitarium, it has since been converted into a retirement home.

In 1973, Scarlet Oaks was listed on the National Register of Historic Places. Despite the difficulty of being a religiously affiliated property, it qualified for inclusion because of its distinctive and historically significant architecture. To the present day, it remains a retirement home, although now affiliated with the Deaconess Hospital.
