= Old Main (Bethany College) =

- Old Main, Bethany College
- U.S. National Register of Historic Places
- U.S. National Historic Landmark
- U.S. Historic district – Contributing property
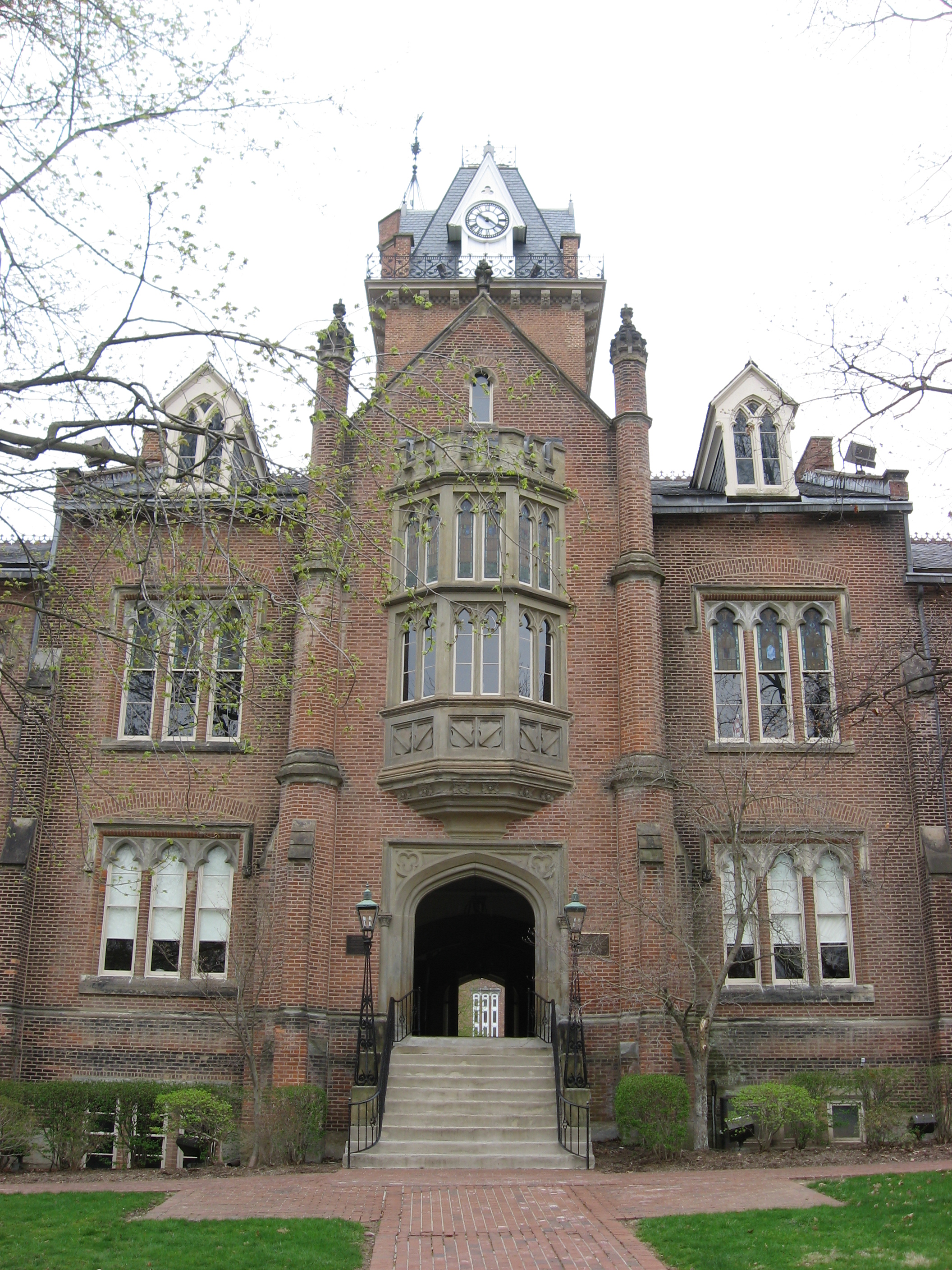
- Eastern front of Old Main

- Location within West Virginia Location within the United States
- Location: Bethany College campus, Bethany, West Virginia
- Coordinates: 40°12′20.8″N 80°33′37.1″W
- Area: 1 acre (0.40 ha)
- Built: 1858
- Architect: Walter & Wilson; James Keys Wilson
- Architectural style: Gothic Revival, Collegiate Gothic
- Part of: Bethany Historic District (ID82004311)
- NRHP reference No.: 70000652

Significant dates
- Added to NRHP: August 25, 1970
- Designated NHL: June 21, 1990
- Designated CP: April 1, 1982

Old Main, Bethany College is a historic building group on the Bethany College campus in Bethany, West Virginia.

== History ==
It was constructed from 1858–1871 on a design by architect James Keys Wilson with the firm of Walter & Wilson (with William Walter) and is an important surviving example of 19th-century Gothic Revival architecture. Wilson became a renowned architect in Cincinnati, Ohio.

Wilson's design was influenced by James Renwick Jr., whose office he studied in, and may have been modeled after Renwick's Smithsonian Museum (constructed 1845–1847) design. Wilson was in partnership with William Walter, an older architect, at the time of Old Main's construction but the design was most likely Wilson's "because his training had occurred during the increasing vogue of the Gothic style". William Kimbrough Pendleton, a faculty member and vice-president of Bethany College also had a role and contributed his practical knowledge of architecture with the supervision of construction and has been credited with responsibility for its placement on the crest of the hill as well as suggesting the arcade (architecture) on the back of the building. He may also have been responsible for the installation of firewalls, which permitted it to survive the 1879 fire that destroyed Society Hall.

The building was constructed from 1858 and 1871 and "represents" the college's "pivotal historical role as the headquarters of Alexander Campbell (1788–1866), a principal founder of the Christian Church (Disciples of Christ)." The college "is the fountainhead institution of more than a hundred colleges and universities established in the United States by the church." It is "intimately linked to the Scots-Irish ethnic settlement of the American frontier," and "Old Main is one of the country's earliest intact large-scale examples of collegiate Gothic architecture." A 1909 photo shows the coal smokestacks on the roofline.

John F. Kennedy spoke at its Commencement Hall in 1960 during his presidential primary campaign that won West Virginia.

Old Main was declared a National Historic Landmark in 1990.

== Current use ==
The Old Main building includes Commencement Hall, used for concerts, convocations, lectures, dramatic presentations, special functions, dinners, and other gatherings; Kirkpatrick Hall of Life Sciences, devoted to biology, microbiology, and botany laboratories, a greenhouse, faculty offices, a student library and conference room, a psychology computer laboratory, an experimental psychology laboratory, an animal research laboratory, a cold room for experiments, classrooms relating to the life sciences, a classroom for environmental science, and a student psychology lounge; the Media Center, used for administration, use, storing and dispensing of media equipment; the Academic Parlour, used for lectures, receptions, and special gatherings; the Trustee Board Room, used for board of trustees meetings; Trustee Hall of Fame Room, used for receptions; Office of the Vice President and Dean of Faculty, a suite of rooms to the left of the main entrance; Office of the President, a suite of rooms to the right of the main entrance; seminar rooms; webmaster information technology center; and classrooms, many of which are dedicated to professors, alumni, trustees, administrators. The first completed portion of Old Main, what college founder Alexander Campbell called the New Edifice, was Society Hall, which provided for the literary societies and their libraries, as well as a temporary chapel. It later burned in 1879.

Society Hall was ready for use at the opening of the 1858 session, and by the close of the year 1859, 150 feet of frontage of the New Edifice had been completed. Work continued until July 1862 when the finance committee of the board of trustees called a halt. The full length of the building was by then enclosed and roofed, excluding Commencement Hall, but the building was not finished inside. After the Civil War action was taken to complete the second wing of the building, which was to be used as a chapel. This became known as Commencement Hall at the time of its dedication in 1871.

The chapel was moved to the large central hall on the second floor after the central portion of the building was completed. Society Hall, comprising the east wing, burned in 1879 and was not rebuilt until 1911–12, when it was renamed the Earl W. Oglebay Hall of Agriculture. It was used as classroom and laboratory space for biology, chemistry, physics, and agricultural science and contained the offices of the president and dean. The top story included a museum, storage rooms, and bins for hybrid seeds and was used later for economics. An additional front entrance was added as a passageway between Oglebay Hall and the one-story connecting section adjoining it to the south. Students used the arcade (the Corridor), which was re-floored in 1937, for promenading and singing. Oral tradition asserts that Freshman Alley, which is located under the Corridor, was used to stable horses. Later it was used for a variety of functions, including a medical clinic, a library, and college storerooms.

The stone foundation for Commencement Hall was laid in 1860 and built between 1869 and 1871. Dedicated June 13, 1871, it was used as a gymnasium from 1890 to 1903, when it was converted into the Norman A. Phillips Dormitory for Men. In 1924 the hall was restored and an auditorium was added on the upper level with seating for 700. Thayer and Johnson were hired to be the architects on February 2, 1922, and the windows of Commencement Hall were remodeled in Gothic style.

Browne, Eichman & Dalgliesch of Charlottesville, Virginia submitted plans for the restoration of Commencement Hall on July 22, 1980, and it was restored to its original design with the removal of the intervening floor added in 1924, returning the building to its 1871 appearance. Between 1976 and 1984 restoration included work on the roof and exterior, restoration of Commencement Hall, installation of Alumni Walk in front of the building, restoration of classrooms, restoration of the Academic Parlour on the second floor, and of the office of the President. A formal dedication took place on November 9, 1984. Oglebay Hall of Agriculture was restored in 1998–1999 and renamed Kirkpatrick Hall of Life Sciences and dedicated October 21, 1999. Restoration of the Tower took place in 2000–2001, when the entire top of the tower was removed with a large crane and replaced at the conclusion of the restoration.

The landmarked area includes the building and the landscaped slope leading up to it. It is located on West Virginia Route 67 in Bethany, West Virginia.
