= Wilma Z. Davis =

American codebreaker during World War II

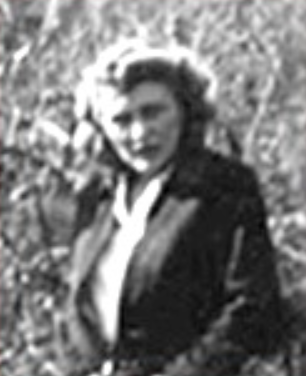
- Photo of Wilma Zimmerman Davis, leading female cryptanalyst during World War II
- Born: Wilma Zimmerman Davis; March 12, 1912
- Died: December 10, 2001 (aged 89)
- Burial place: Arlington National Cemetery; Section: 30 Grave: 564-A-LH; 38°53′02.1″N 77°4′11.1″W
- Other name: Wilma Berryman
- Education: Bethany College
- Occupation: Cryptanalyst
- Spouses: John Berryman; John Mason (m. 1949; died 1952) John Davis (died 1997)

Wilma Zimmerman Davis (31 March 1912 – 10 December 2001) was an early American codebreaker during World War II. She was a leading national cryptanalyst before and during World War II and the Vietnam War. She graduated with a degree in Mathematics from Bethany College and successfully completed navy correspondence course in cryptology. She began her career as a leading cryptanalyst which spanned over 30 years in the United States Army Signal Intelligence Service (SIS), a predecessor of the National Security Agency (NSA) in the 1930s. She was hired by William Friedman, who was a US cryptographer in the Army and led the research division of the Army’s Signal Intelligence in the 1930s. Wilma Davis worked as a cryptanalyst on the Italian, Japanese, Chinese, Vietnamese, and Russian problems. She also worked on the Venona project.

== Early life and education ==
She grew up in a steel town called Beech Bottom, West Virginia, which had about 400 people, a church, a pool room, a drug store, and a company store. She had three siblings and her father worked for a steel company. She went to high school in Wellsburg, West Virginia and graduated in 1928. Wilma attended a small college – Bethany College which had about three hundred and fifty students at the time. She graduated with a degree in Mathematics in 1932. She was actively involved in college, so much so that she sometimes could not make it home for Christmas. Her father gave her only a thousand dollars as she left college because that was all he could afford to give her. Her mother died a few months before she graduated from college.

== Career ==
After graduating from college, Wilma was meant to teach high school, but she ended up teaching first graders due to lack of jobs for high school teachers. After a year, she took a job in her hometown as a Math teacher, where she worked for four years and made about ninety dollars a month. Since teachers only worked for nine months in the year, she made about eight hundred and ten dollars a year. Due to the demise of her mother, Wilma was responsible for taking care of the house while her siblings were in high school. Thereafter, she worked in a payroll office and later as a code clerk at the unemployment census.

Wilma Davis’ interest in cryptology was piqued after reading in the Washington Star about William and Elizabeth Friedman, who were American codebreakers. She was enrolled in some Navy correspondence courses in cryptology by her brother-in-law who was a civil servant. Davis relished the courses in cryptology and excelled in them. She decided to sit for the Civil Service exam and got on the civil service register. She worked at the National Bureau of Aeronautics (NBS) for about nine months before she received her civil service status. She worked at the Civil Service Commission as a junior Civil Service Examiner, where she was given her first job as a cryptanalyst by William Friedman in 1937 or 1938. There was a big expansion in the Signal Intelligence and Friedman was looking to recruit individuals to work there. Friedman offered Wilma $1620 while she was making about $1440. She had to put her name on a sign-in sheet and she was 19 on the list. Wilma was ecstatic about this opportunity, more so, because William Friedman and his wife were the major driving force of her cryptology interest.

In March 1941, she was first assigned to work with Dr. Abe Sinkov on breaking the Italian diplomatic codes. The Italians invented their own encryption machines, US codenamed as the Japanese Purple Machines, which were improvements of the German Enigma machine. The Italians used their machines to transmit high-level military secrets mainly to diplomats and military officials in Berlin, Washington, and London to avoid intrusions or interceptions from other nations. The Italian intercepts came from Western Union and the British were instrumental in breaking the Italian code. Wilma and her colleagues worked on the Italian problem while taking cryptology courses. They were responsible for getting the messages, organizing it, recording it, filing it, and deciphering the messages.

In July 1942, she was assigned to "Department A", which was responsible for working on code messages from the Japanese Army. William Friedman initially worked on breaking the Japanese codes. In two years working in Department A, she was put in charge of the unit whose duty was to analyze and interpret the addresses which were linked to the messages of the Japanese military. One of the main goals of deciphering the Japanese messages was to figure out the Japanese Order of Battle. Wilma worked alongside Ann Caracristi, first female deputy of the NSA, to break the Japanese codes. Wilma was revered for her deep knowledge, prioritize assignments, successfully onboard new team members, and unwavering dedication to her work. The successful work of her team on the Japanese problem allowed the US to gain an upper hand on the Japanese. The Japanese machine was one of the most sophisticated cipher machines in that era and breaking it gave the US access to top-level Japanese messages during World War II. In an NSA interview with Working on the Japanese problem was one of the highest points of Wilma’s cryptology career.

At the end of the war, she was requested to work on to the Chinese team which was led by Dr. Leslie Rutledge, an NSA scholar. The request was made by Frank Rowlett, who was the chief of the Intelligence Division from 1945 to 1947. Frank Rowlett had put Wilma in a difficult situation by asking her to take charge of the Chinese project and report back to him. Essentially asking her to run the project without any regard for Leslie Rutledge who was the head. This made Wilma become conflicted as it went against her convictions. It bothered Wilma so much that she became physically sick and went to see her doctor. According to her doctor, she was on the verge of a nervous breakdown. She eventually verbalized her concerns to Mr. Rowlett and he found someone else to take charge which was a great relief to Wilma. Wilma indicated that she had no ill feelings towards Dr. Leslie Rutledge and they both worked together on starting the missile problem.

After working with the Chinese team, she moved to the Venona project trying to break Soviet messages. The information obtained from working on the Venona project was instrumental in the Soviet’s activities during the Cold War. Wilma Davis worked on the Venona project until 1949, then got married and moved to Canada with her second husband, John Mason. After the demise of her second husband, John Mason, Wilma received a telegram from William Friedman to return to work in Washington D.C. Wilma was put in charge of the Russian Diplomatic problem. She was then reassigned to the Venona project in 1952 after the death of John Mason. Wilma left her cryptology work again after marrying her third husband, John Davis. She took up the position of assistant director of production. Wilma remained an avid supporter of John Davis in all his roles which contributed to his accomplishments.

Wilma Davis left the cryptologic field a few times during her career, but she could not stay away. She returned to work on Venona and returned a second time during the Vietnam War. Despite leaving and returning twice to cryptology over her career, she finally retired in 1973. Wilma Davis concluded her career as a pioneer cryptanalyst as the senior executive of the Cryptanalytic Career Panel. In the years following her retirement, Wilma Davis lived in Fairfax, Virginia.

== Family life ==
During her early years as a cryptanalyst, she was known as Wilma Berryman. Wilma was married and widowed three times. She met her first husband, John Berryman, at Bethany College. They were both classmates and moved to Washington D.C in the 1930s. John Berryman worked at the general accounting office in Washington D.C. at the time. John Berryman died six months after Wilma began working for the Signal Intelligence. In the fall of 1949, she married her second husband, John Mason, who was a Major in the British Army. She relocated to Canada with John Mason, who died suddenly in summer of 1952 while visiting her sister, Helen, in Erie, Pennsylvania. Wilma returned to the US to continue her job as a cryptanalyst and married her third husband, John Davis, who was a Brigadier General.

== Legacy and death ==
Wilma Davis is featured as one of 18 leading women in cryptology by the National Cryptologic Museum Foundation. Wilma Davis is recognized as an Honoree of the Women in American Cryptology by the National Security Agency (NSA). An article written by her in the Phoenician describes her as “one of the Founding Mothers of cryptology”. Benson K. Buffman describes her as one of the most gifted cryptanalysts of Arlington Hall. Wilma Davis died on December 10, 2001, at the age of 89 and currently buried beside her third husband, John Davis, at the Arlington National Cemetery in Fort Myer Arlington, Virginia.
