= John J. Davis (general) =

United States Army general

John Joseph Davis
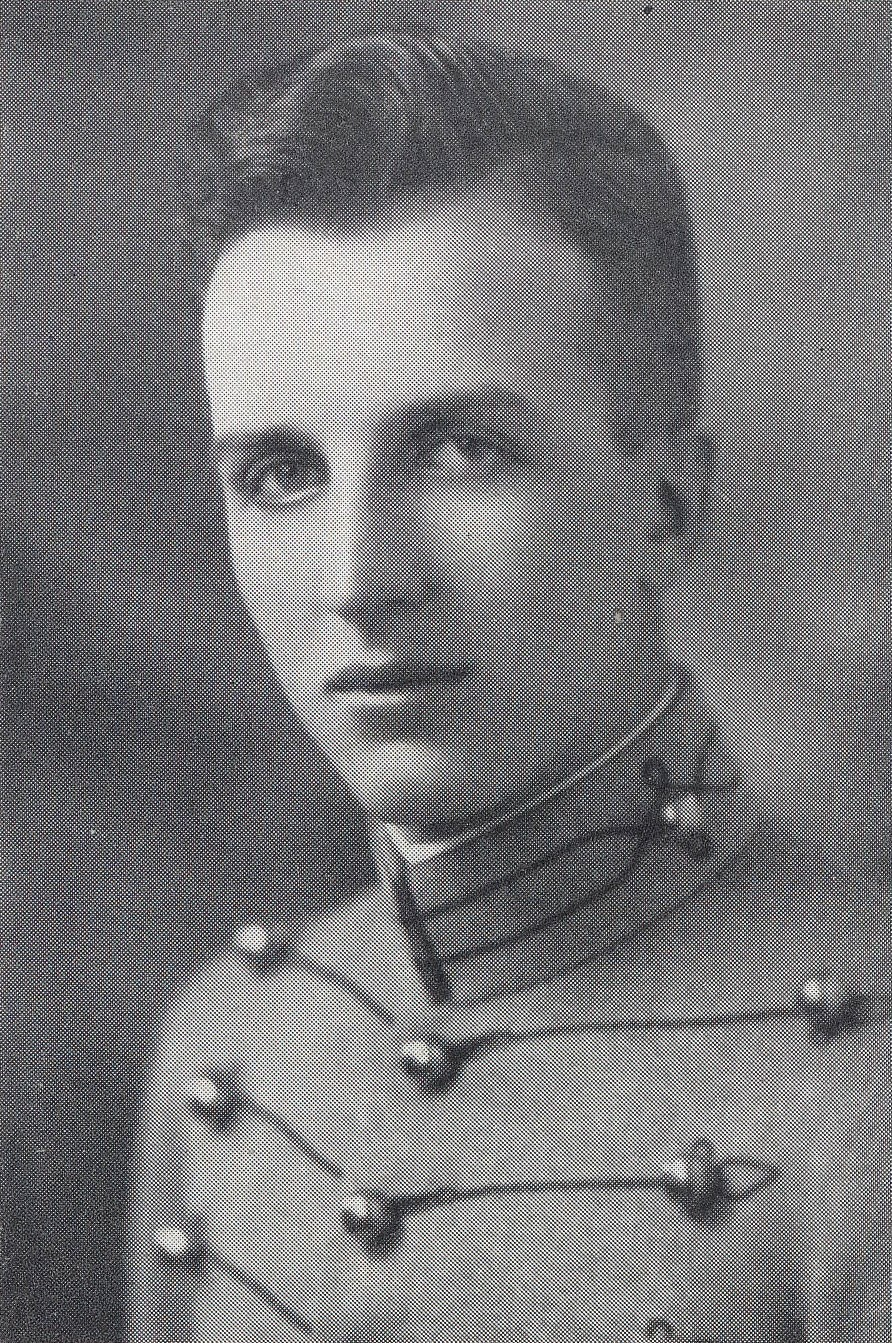
- Davis at West Point in 1931
- Born: March 19, 1909; Leavenworth, Kansas
- Died: August 22, 1997 (aged 88); Alexandria, Virginia
- Burial place: Arlington National Cemetery; Section: 30 Grave: 564-A-LH
- Spouse: Wilma Z. Davis
- Military career
- Allegiance: United States of America
- Branch: United States Army
- Service years: 1931–1970
- Rank: Lieutenant General
- Conflicts: World War II; Cold War
- Awards: Distinguished Service Medal (2); Legion of Merit; Bronze Star Medal (2); Air Medal (2)

John J. Davis (March 19, 1909 – August 22, 1997) was a U.S. Army officer. In the 1960s Davis, then a major general, served as the assistant chief of staff for intelligence, headquarters, Department of the Army. He was later promoted to lieutenant general and served as a military advisor during the SALT I and SALT II negotiations.

== Biography ==
Davis graduated from the United States Military Academy in June 1931. He was commissioned as a second lieutenant of field artillery and assigned to the 3rd Field Artillery at Fort Benjamin Harrison, Indiana. In 1935, Davis was reassigned to the 11th Field Artillery at Schofield Barracks, Hawaii and promoted to first lieutenant. He graduated from the Field Artillery School at Fort Sill, Oklahoma in June 1938. Davis then completed the advanced communications course at the Field Artillery School in June 1939. He was subsequently assigned to the 80th Field Artillery at Fort Des Moines, Iowa.

Davis was promoted to major in February 1942 and graduated from the field officer training course at Fort Leonard Wood, Missouri in March 1942. He then served as a battalion commander in the 80th Field Artillery until November 1942, receiving a promotion to lieutenant colonel in October. Davis was then assigned to the Field Artillery School, teaching tactics and communications until June 1943 and then directing the radio section until April 1944. He was subsequently given command of the 244th Field Artillery Battalion, training at Camp Gordon, Georgia until July 1944 and then participating in European combat operations until June 1945. Davis received the Legion of Merit, two Bronze Star Medals and two Air Medals for his wartime service.

After World War II, Davis graduated from the Command and General Staff School at Fort Leavenworth, Kansas in February 1946. He subsequently served as assistant director and then director of the communications department at Fort Sill. Davis then attended the Armed Forces Staff College at Norfolk, Virginia, graduating in February 1949. He was next sent to study at the Strategic Intelligence School before going to Pretoria in South Africa as army attaché later in 1949.

Davis was promoted to colonel in September 1950. He graduated from the Army War College in 1953. Davis was promoted to brigadier general in June 1956 and major general in July 1962. He received two Distinguished Service Medals for his service as a general officer.

Davis is a member of the Military Intelligence Hall of Fame. He retired from active duty in 1970 and lived in Fairfax, Virginia. Davis died at Inova Mount Vernon Hospital in 1997 of a stroke. He was interred at Arlington National Cemetery on August 28, 1997.
