= Alexander Campbell Mansion =

Historic house in West Virginia, United States

- Campbell Mansion
- U.S. National Register of Historic Places
- U.S. National Historic Landmark District
- U.S. Historic district – Contributing property
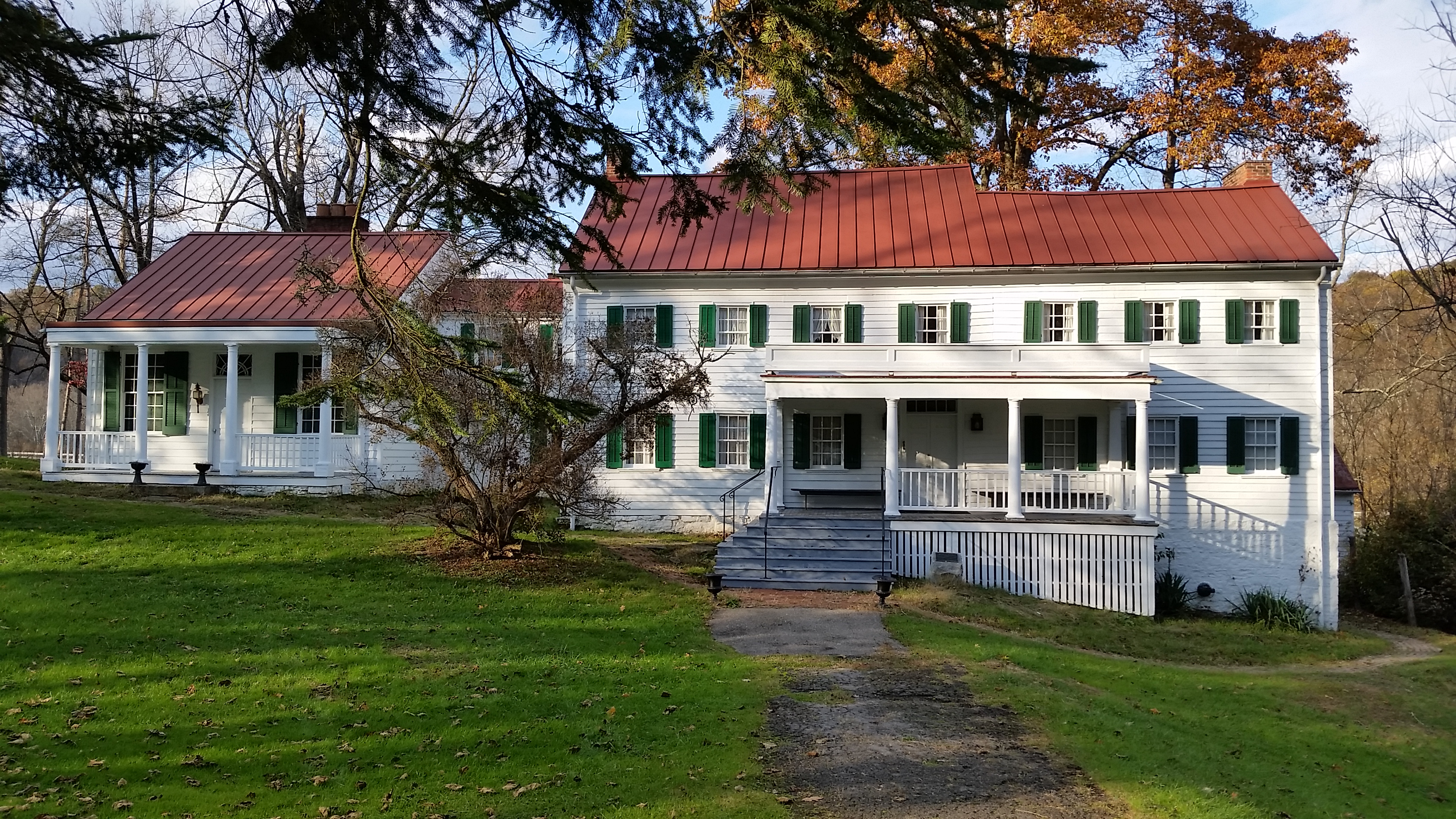
- Front of the mansion
- Nearest city: Bethany, West Virginia
- Coordinates: 40°12′27.5″N 80°32′51.5″W
- Area: 8 acres (3.2 ha)
- Built: 1793
- Part of: Bethany Historic District (ID82004311)
- NRHP reference No.: 70000651

Significant dates
- Added to NRHP: October 15, 1970
- Designated NHLD: April 19, 1994
- Designated CP: April 1, 1982

The Alexander Campbell Mansion, also known as Campbell Mansion or Alexander Campbell House, is a historic house on West Virginia Route 67 just east of Bethany, West Virginia. Built in 1793 and repeatedly enlarged, it was the home of minister Alexander Campbell (1788–1866) following his marriage in 1811. Known as the "sage of Bethany", Campbell was one of the most prominent early leaders of the Restoration Movement in United States Christianity, beginning in 1812, which resulted in formation of numerous congregations of the Disciples of Christ and Churches of Christ. The house, now a museum maintained by Bethany College (founded by Campbell in 1840), was designated a National Historic Landmark in 1994.

== Description and history ==
The Campbell Mansion is located a short way east of Bethany, on property that is partially crossed by West Virginia 67. The main house and outbuildings are set just on the north side of the road, while the small Campbell cemetery and a small orchard historically associated with the Campbells are on the south side. The main house is a rambling 2 1/2-story frame structure, its central portion encrusted by additions on both sides. That portion was built in 1793 by John Brown, the future father-in-law of Alexander Campbell. It is an unusually high-quality example of Federal architecture for what was then a very rural setting. It originally had a porch on the west side, which was enclosed by Alexander Campbell in 1819, adding a second story to provide dormitory space for his seminary. The right-side addition was made in 1836–40, in order to accommodate Campbell's regular parade of visitors. Standing near the house is a small hexagonal stone building, which Campbell used as a library and office.

Alexander Campbell was a native of Ireland who came to the United States in 1809, joining his father Thomas as a religious minister in western Pennsylvania. He married Margaret Brown in the parlor of this house in 1811. The Campbells were both influential religious leaders, responsible in part for the formation of the Restoration Movement of the 1820s. Campbell founded Bethany College in 1840, and served as its president until his death; its graduates seeded many new schools and churches across the country.

The property remained in the Campbell family until 1913. Its next owner donated the property, with furnishings intact, to a memorial association in 1920. It worked in association with Bethany College to maintain the property, and the college is now responsible for its care. The college offers guided tours of the house; admission is charged.

== See also ==
- List of National Historic Landmarks in West Virginia
- National Register of Historic Places listings in Brooke County, West Virginia
