= Old Bethany Church =

Historic church in West Virginia, United States

- U.S. National Register of Historic Places
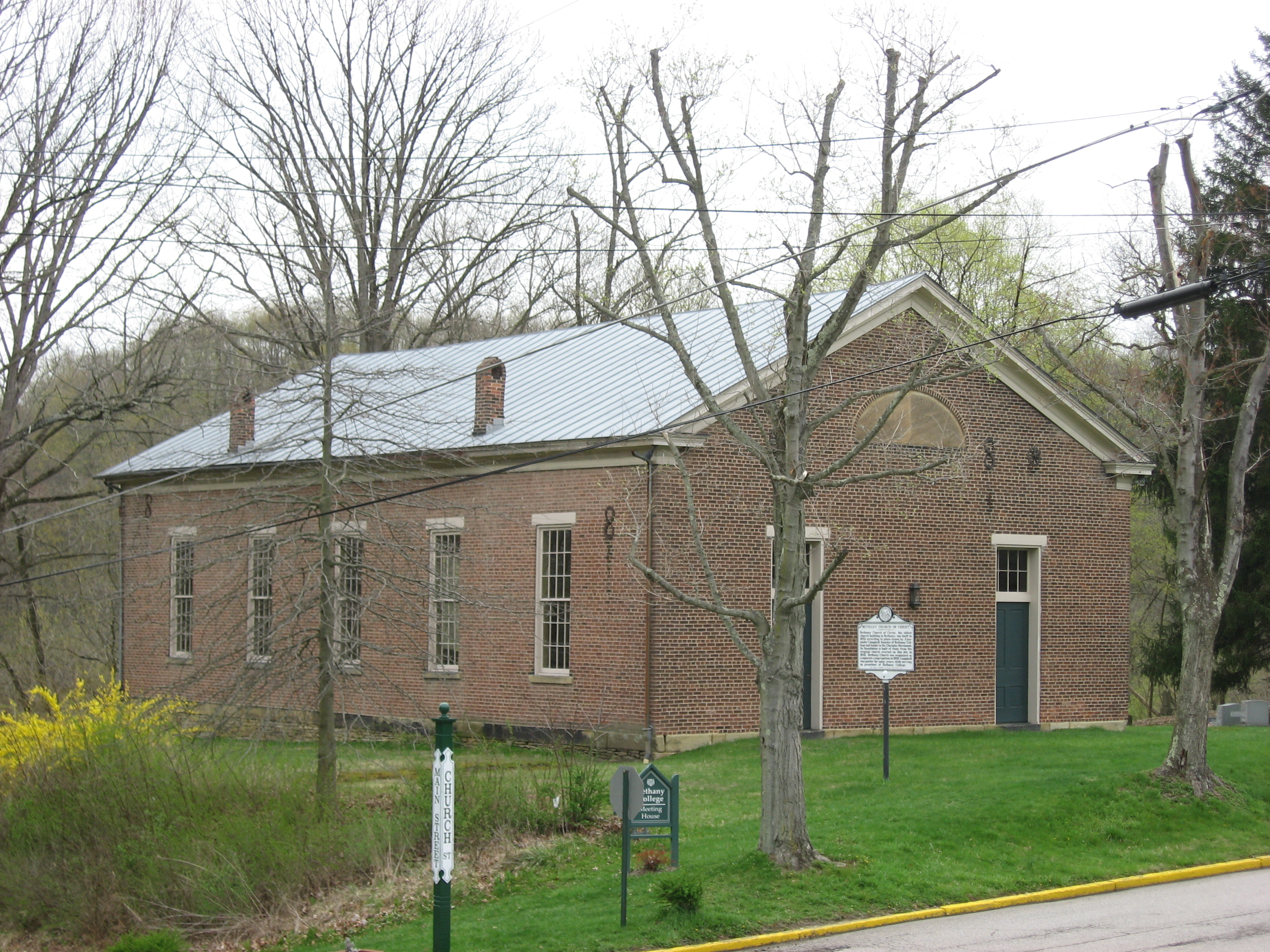
- Front and side of the church

- Location within West Virginia Location within the United States
- Location: Main and Church Sts., Bethany, West Virginia
- Coordinates: 40°12′23″N 80°33′15″W
- Area: 2 acres (0.81 ha)
- Built: 1852
- NRHP reference No.: 76001932
- Added to NRHP: December 12, 1976

Old Bethany Church, also known as Old Bethany Church of Christ and Old Meetinghouse of the Bethany, is a historic Disciples of Christ church located at Main and Church Streets in Bethany, Brooke County, West Virginia. It was built in 1852, and is a two bay by five bay, brick meeting house-style building on a fieldstone and sandstone foundation. It is the second church building on this site and notable in the Disciples of Christ for its association with Alexander Campbell (1788–1866).

It was listed on the National Register of Historic Places in 1976.
