= Pendleton Heights (Bethany, West Virginia) =

Historic house in West Virginia, United States

- U.S. National Register of Historic Places
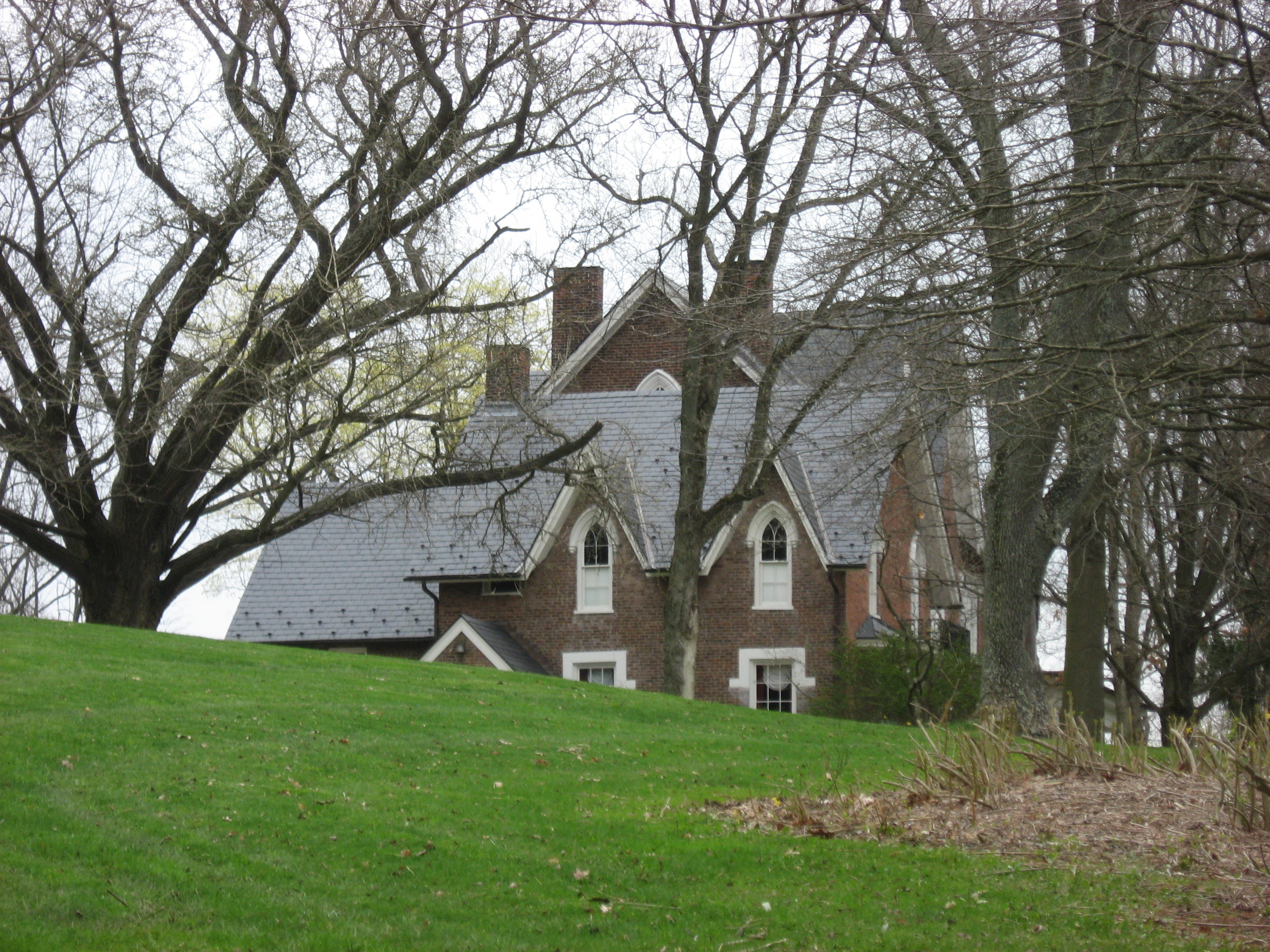
- Pendleton Heights at Bethany College, April 2011

- Location within West Virginia Location within the United States
- Location: Bethany College campus, Bethany, West Virginia
- Coordinates: 40°12′24″N 80°33′35″W
- Area: 2 acres (0.81 ha)
- Built: 1841
- Architectural style: Gothic
- NRHP reference No.: 75001882
- Added to NRHP: June 26, 1975

Pendleton Heights, also known as the William K. Pendleton House and Christman Manor at Pendleton Heights, is a historic home located on the campus of Bethany College, at Bethany, Brooke County, West Virginia. It was built in 1841, as a small, box like dwelling. It was altered in 1872 by college president William K. Pendleton to take on a Gothic Revival-style of architecture like other buildings on campus. It is a two-story brick residence with characteristic steep gable roofs and arched windows.

It was listed on the National Register of Historic Places in 1975.
