= Robert Orr =

Robert Orr may refer to:

- Bob Orr (bookseller) (born 1950), co-founder of Lavender Menace Bookshop in Edinburgh, Scotland
- Bobby Orr (born 1948), Canadian hockey player
- Bobby Orr (drummer) (1928–2020), jazz drummer
- Rob Orr (politician) (born 1955), Texas politician, represented Texas's 58th House of Representatives district 2005–2015
- Robert Orr (executive) (1953–2021), American businessman in Japan, President of Boeing Japan, Vice President of Motorola
- Robert Orr (footballer) (1891–1948), Scottish footballer
- Robert Orr Jr. (1786–1876), American politician, U.S. Representative from Pennsylvania
- Robert C. Orr, UN Assistant Secretary-General for Policy Coordination and Strategic Planning
- Robert D. Orr (1917–2004), American politician, Governor of Indiana
  - Bust of Robert D. Orr
- Robert F. Orr (born 1946), American lawyer and judge
- Robert T. Orr (1908–1994), American biologist
- Robert Kemsley Orr (1909–2006), known as Robin Orr, Scottish composer
- C. Rob Orr (born 1950), American college swimmer and swimming coach
- July Jones, American actor whose birth name was Robert Orr
