= Delta Tau Delta Founders House =

Historic house in Bethany, West Virginia, US

- U.S. National Register of Historic Places
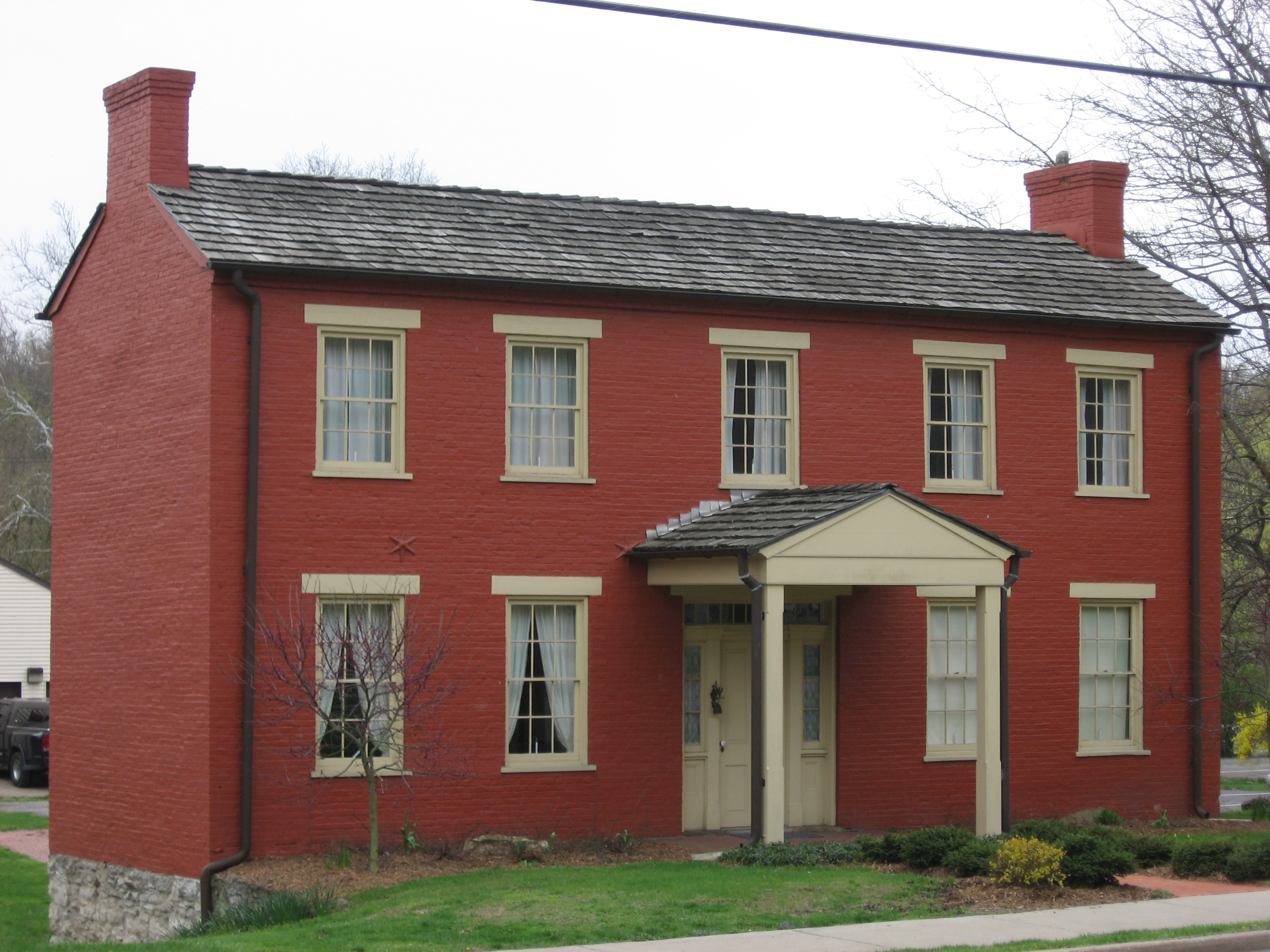
- Delta Tau Delta Founders House, April 2011

- Location within West Virginia Location within the United States
- Location: 211 Main St., Bethany, WV
- Coordinates: 40°12′19″N 80°33′27″W
- Area: 0.1 acres (0.040 ha)
- Built: 1858
- Architectural style: Greek Revival, Other, Provincial Greek Revival
- NRHP reference No.: 79002571
- Added to NRHP: May 29, 1979

Delta Tau Delta Founders House is a historic home associated with Bethany College, at Bethany, Brooke County, West Virginia. It was listed on the National Register of Historic Places in 1979.

It was built in the early 1850s, and is a two-story, five-bay Greek Revival-style dwelling. It is L-shaped and constructed of brick on a limestone foundation. The Delta Tau Delta fraternity was founded here in 1858–1859.

== See also ==
- North American fraternity and sorority housing
