= Bethany College (West Virginia) =

Private college in Bethany, West Virginia, US

Coordinates: 40°12′21″N 80°33′37″W

- Bethany College Seal
- Former name: Buffalo Seminary
- Motto: "World Of Worth And Value"
- Type: Private liberal arts college
- Established: 1840; 186 years ago
- Founder: Alexander Campbell
- Religious affiliation: Christian Church
- Endowment: $51.4 million (2023)
- Budget: 45.6 Million
- President: Jamie Caridi
- Vice-president: Dr. Jeffrey R. Breese
- Academic staff: 72
- Administrative staff: 75
- Students: 623 (fall 2022)
- Location: Bethany, West Virginia, Bethany, West Virginia, 26032, US
- Campus: 1,300 acres (530 ha); Rural, 1,300 acres (526 ha) total
- Colors: Green and white
- Nickname: Bison
- Sporting affiliations: NCAA Division III – PAC
- Mascot: Boomer The Bison
- Website: bethanywv.edu

Bethany College is a private liberal arts college in Bethany, West Virginia, United States. Founded in 1840 by minister Alexander Campbell of the Restoration Movement, who gained support by the Virginia legislature, Bethany College was the first institution of higher education in what is now West Virginia. (Note: West Liberty University is older but was a secondary school until 1870.) The college has an enrollment of approximately 620 students.

== History ==
A liberal arts college, Bethany was chartered on March 2, 1840, by the Virginia legislature and given "all degree-granting powers" of the University of Virginia. West Virginia's secession from Virginia on June 20, 1863, recognized existing Virginia charters; Bethany College continues to operate under the Virginia charter.

It was founded by Alexander Campbell, a minister in the Restoration Movement who provided the land and funds for the first building and served as the first president. Bethany has been a four-year private liberal arts college affiliated with the Christian Church (Disciples of Christ), since its inception. This religious body, of which Campbell was one of the principal founders, continues to support and encourage the college but exercises no sectarian control. An early center of coeducation, Bethany has admitted women since the 1880s.

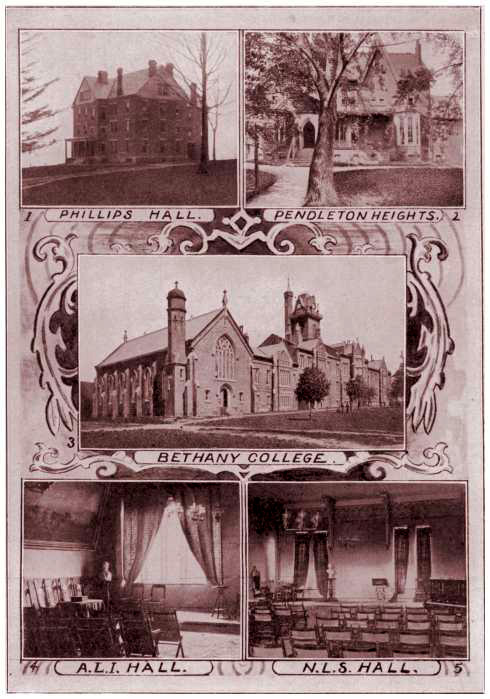
Images of Bethany College, 1904

The college's roots stem from the Buffalo Seminary, founded in 1818, by Campbell; sessions were first held in his mansion in Bethany, home of Alexander Campbell and his father Thomas Campbell. The new Buffalo Seminary, " a continuing education arm of the College" is less than a mile away from the College.

The college is the birthplace of Delta Tau Delta, an international social fraternity founded in 1858.

During World War II, Bethany was one of 131 colleges nationally that took part in the V-12 Navy College Training Program, which offered students a path to a Navy commission.

A number of campus buildings are contributing resources to the Bethany Historic District. The Historic District was listed on the National Register of Historic Places in 1982. Pendleton Heights was listed in 1975 and the Delta Tau Delta Founders House in 1979.

The campus is also home to the Parkinson Forest, which in 2019 was added to the national Old-Growth Forest Network. The designation identifies the Parkinson Forest as the oldest Old-Growth Forest in Brooke County.

== Academics ==
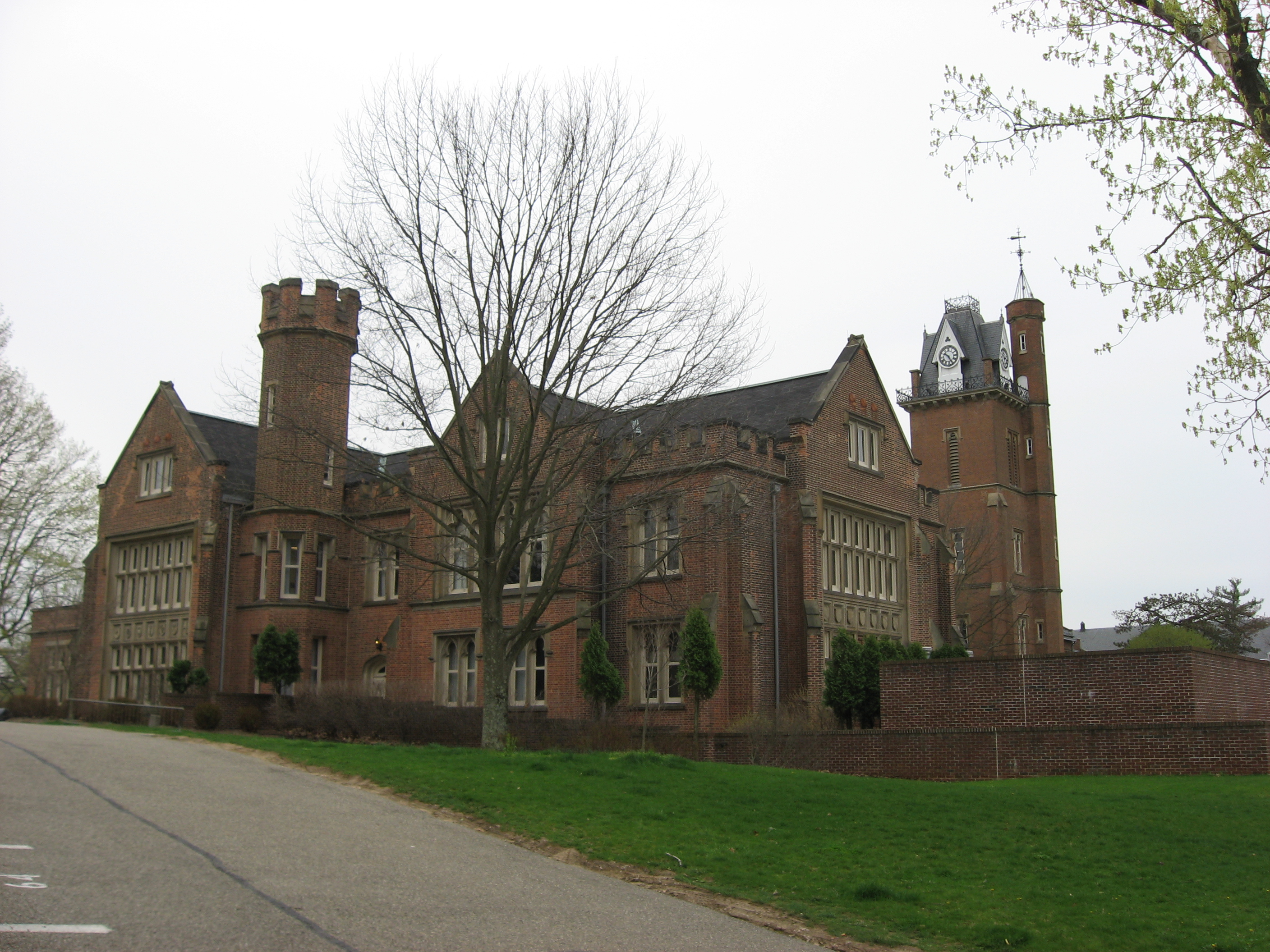
Old Main

Bethany College Bachelor of Science and Bachelor of Arts degrees in more than 25 fields.

In 2021, 95% of Bethany College graduates carried student loan debt, averaging $25,704. The endowment fund in 2016 was worth $46.7 million.

== Student life ==
Bethany College has multiple opportunities for student engagement, ranging from sports to social events. The main social event at the school is Homecoming Weekend, which takes place in October.

=== Athletics ===
Bethany athletics wordmark

Bethany College athletic teams are nicknamed the Bison. The college is a member of the Division III level of the National Collegiate Athletic Association (NCAA), primarily competing in the Presidents' Athletic Conference.

Bethany men's and women's teams compete in 14 intercollegiate varsity sports: acrobatics, baseball, basketball, cross country, equestrian, football, golf, lacrosse, soccer, softball, swimming, track and field, volleyball, and wrestling.

== Notable alumni ==
- Virginia Dare Aderholdt, an Arlington Hall cryptanalyst and Japanese translator, who decrypted the intercepted Japanese surrender message, August 14, 1945.
- W. W. Anderson, attorney, known for shooting Frederick Gilmer Bonfils and Harry Heye Tammen of The Denver Post.
- Joseph Baldwin (1852), educator and founder of Truman State University.
- James Beauchamp "Champ" Clark (1873), Democratic representative from Missouri and Speaker of the United States House of Representatives.
- Walter M. Bortz III, educator and 23rd president of Hampden-Sydney College.
- Thomas Buergenthal (1957), retired U.S. judge on the International Court of Justice.
- Faith Daniels (1979), CBS and NBC news anchor.
- Wilma Z. Davis (1912-2001), codebreaker during World War II and the Vietnam War.
- Daniel Coleman DeJarnette Sr. (1822-1881) Democratic representative from Virginia, served in the United States House of Representatives and then in the Confederate Congress during the American Civil War.
- Richard E. Doran (1978), Florida Attorney General.
- Shane Douglas (1986), professional wrestler.
- William Ferrel (1844), meteorologist.
- Sid Gepford, NFL player.
- Bob Goin (1959), athletic director in Florida State University and University of Cincinnati.
- Caroline Gordon (1916), novelist and critic, author of Penhally.
- Kristan Hawkins, president of Students for Life of America (SFLA).
- Kaye Gorenflo Hearn, Justice of the Supreme Court of South Carolina.
- Joseph Rucker Lamar (1877), Associate Justice, Supreme Court of the United States.
- Edgar Odell Lovett (1890 [class valedictorian]), first president of Rice University.
- William H. Macy, Emmy Award-winning actor (attended; transferred to Goddard College.)
- Oliver S. Marshall (1850–1934), president of the West Virginia Senate 1899 to 1901 from Hancock County.
- William King McAlister (1850–1923), justice of the Tennessee Supreme Court
- Frances McDormand (1979), film, television and stage actress and winner of four Academy Awards including Best Actress for Fargo (1996) and Three Billboards Outside Ebbing, Missouri (2017), and Best Picture and Best Actress for Nomadland (2020).
- John William McGarvey (1829–1911), religious educator.
- Don Megerle, International Swimming Hall of Fame award recipient, and 33-year Head Swim Coach for Tufts University, 1971-2004. He was a swimmer for Bethany in the late 1960s.
- Adrian Melott (1968), astrophysicist and cosmologist.
- John E. Niederhuber, 13th director of the National Cancer Institute (NCI).
- George Tener Oliver (1868), United States Senator from Pennsylvania (1909 to 1917).
- John O. Pendleton (1871), United States Representative.
- Tom Poston, Emmy Award-winning actor (attended but was not graduated from Bethany College).
- Jeffrey L. Seglin, (1978), writer of the weekly column "The Right Thing," faculty member, John F. Kennedy School of Government at Harvard University.
- Dave Sims (1975), Emmy Award-winning sportscaster.
- Sukhi Turner, mayor of Dunedin, New Zealand, during 1995–2004.
- Bob Orr (1975), Emmy Award-winning CBS News correspondent
