= John S. Baker House =

Historic house in Ohio, United States

- U.S. National Register of Historic Places
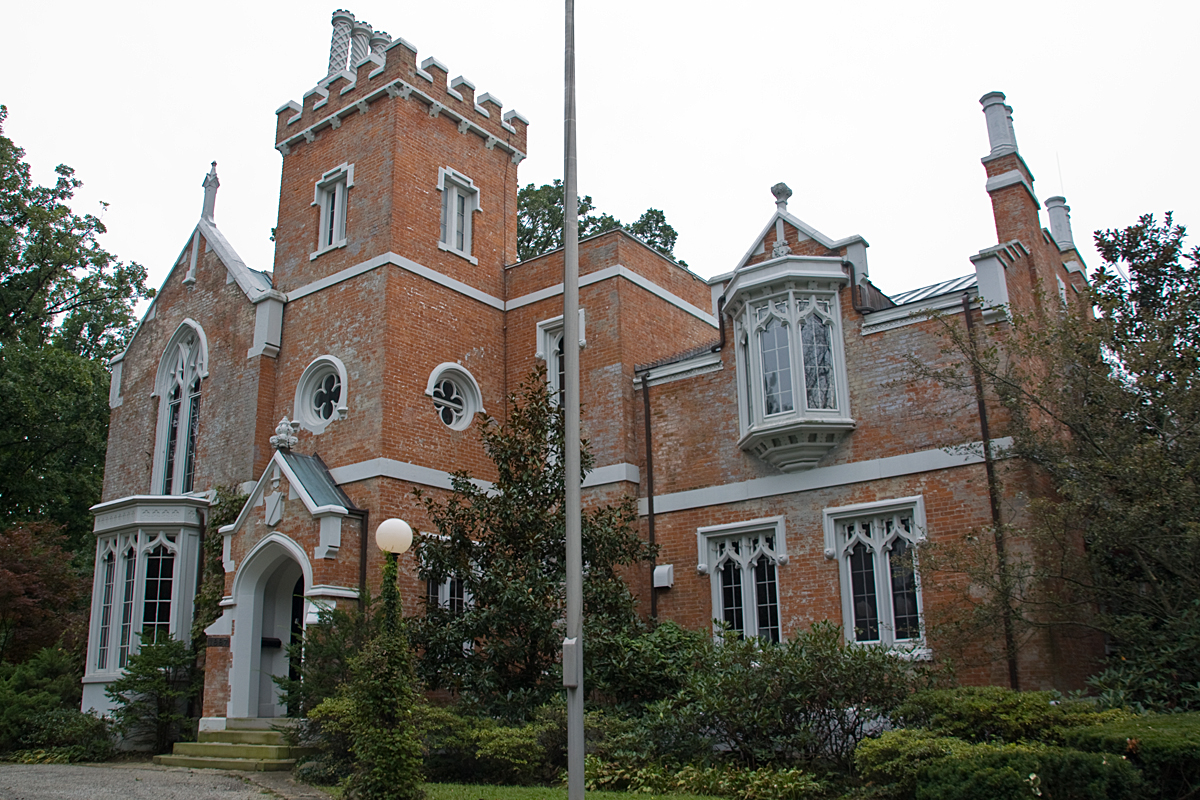
- Front of the house

- Location within Ohio Location within the United States
- Location: 1887 Madison Rd., Cincinnati, Ohio
- Coordinates: 39°7′45″N 84°28′4″W
- Area: 1.8 acres (0.73 ha)
- Built: 1854
- Architect: James Keys Wilson
- Architectural style: Gothic Revival
- NRHP reference No.: 79001852
- Added to NRHP: June 6, 1979

The John S. Baker House is a historic house in the East Walnut Hills neighborhood of Cincinnati, Ohio, United States. Built in 1854 according to a design by Cincinnati architect James Keys Wilson, it was the home of New Jersey native (Wilson's uncle) John S. Baker, who settled in Cincinnati in 1814.

The Baker House is primarily a brick structure with some elements of weatherboarding; it rests on a stone foundation and is covered by a metal roof. Its architecture is prominent in many ways, most significant of which are its overall style: no other large brick houses in the Cincinnati area feature such a distinctively Gothic Revival style. Many details produce the sense of a castle, such as its tower, its battlements and crenellations, and the decorations on the unusually placed and shaped windows. The appearance is further improved by the house's location: sitting atop a river bluff, it is visible from a great distance.

In 1979, the Baker House was listed on the National Register of Historic Places because of its historically significant architecture. Included in the listing were two related buildings, a studio and residence for servants; they are located on the side of the bluff below the main house.
