= Bethany, West Virginia =

- Town
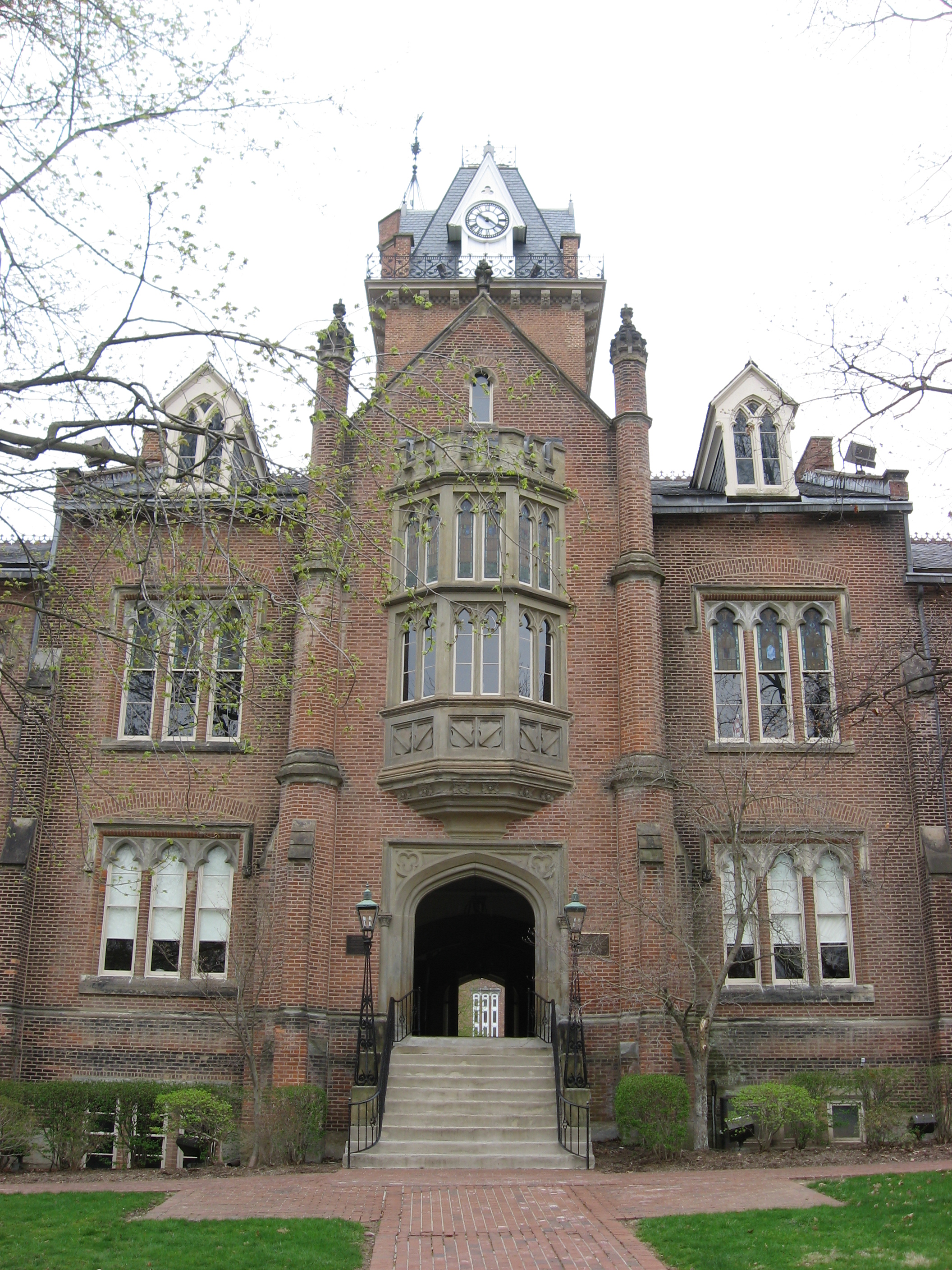
- Old Main at Bethany College

- Location of Bethany in Brooke County, West Virginia.
- Coordinates: 40°12′23″N 80°33′35″W
- Country: United States
- State: West Virginia
- County: Brooke
- Chartered: 1853

Area
  - Total: 0.73 sq mi (1.90 km^{2})
  - Land: 0.73 sq mi (1.90 km^{2})
  - Water: 0.0039 sq mi (0.01 km^{2})
- Elevation: 846 ft (258 m)

Population (2020)
  - Total: 781
  - Estimate (2021): 749
  - Density: 1,094.7/sq mi (422.67/km^{2})
- Time zone: UTC-5 (Eastern (EST))
  - Summer (DST): UTC-4 (EDT)
- ZIP code: 26032
- Area code: 304
- FIPS code: 54-06844
- GNIS feature ID: 1553875
- Website: www.bethanywv.org

Bethany is a town in southern Brooke County, West Virginia, United States. The population was 756 at the 2020 census. It is part of the Weirton–Steubenville metropolitan area. It is best known as the home of Bethany College, a private liberal arts college that was the first institution of higher education in what is now West Virginia.

== History ==
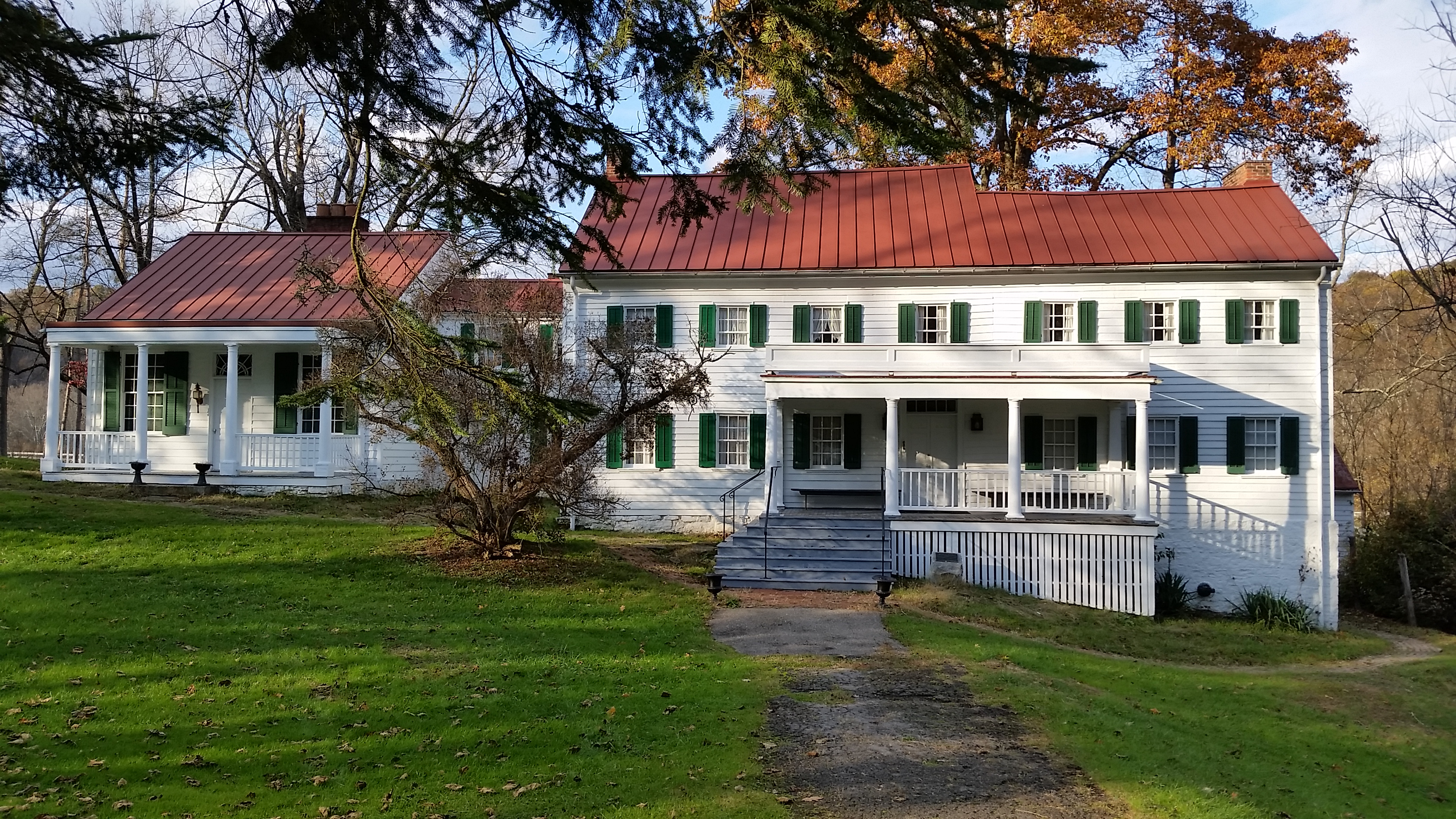
Alexander Campbell Mansion

Scotch-Irish minister Alexander Campbell established a post office in the area of his homestead around 1827. In 1840, he founded Bethany College, and then platted the town in 1847. The town was most likely named after the biblical town of Bethany, where Jesus was said to have raised Lazarus of Bethany from the dead. The town was chartered in 1853.

The Bethany Historic District was listed on the National Register of Historic Places in 1982. Located within the district are the separately listed Alexander Campbell Mansion, Delta Tau Delta Founders House, Old Bethany Church, Old Main, and Pendleton Heights.

== Geography ==
Bethany is located at 40°12′23″N 80°33′35″W (40.206423, -80.559621).

According to the United States Census Bureau, the town has a total area of 0.73 square miles (1.89 km^{2}), all land.

== Demographics ==
Historical population
Census	Pop.	Note	%±
1880	335		—
1900	245		—
1910	433		76.7%
1920	400		−7.6%
1930	439		9.8%
1940	410		−6.6%
1950	1,063		159.3%
1960	992		−6.7%
1970	1,360		37.1%
1980	1,336		−1.8%
1990	1,139		−14.7%
2000	985		−13.5%
2010	1,036		5.2%
2020	781		−24.6%
2021 (est.)	749	▼	−4.1%
U.S. Decennial Census

=== 2010 census ===
At the 2010 census there were 1,036 people, 174 households, and 94 families living in the town. The population density was 1,419.2 inhabitants per square mile (548.0/km^{2}). There were 190 housing units at an average density of 260.3 per square mile (100.5/km^{2}). The racial makeup of the town was 88.9% White, 7.3% African American, 0.4% Native American, 0.5% Asian, 0.7% from other races, and 2.2% from two or more races. Hispanic or Latino of any race were 2.5%.

Of the 174 households 14.9% had children under the age of 18 living with them, 47.1% were married couples living together, 6.3% had a female householder with no husband present, 0.6% had a male householder with no wife present, and 46.0% were non-families. 42.0% of households were one person and 13.2% were one person aged 65 or older. The average household size was 1.93 and the average family size was 2.64.

The median age in the town was 21.3 years. 4.6% of residents were under the age of 18; 68.1% were between the ages of 18 and 24; 9.2% were from 25 to 44; 10% were from 45 to 64; and 8% were 65 or older. The gender makeup of the town was 51.8% male and 48.2% female.

=== 2000 census ===
At the 2000 census there were 985 people, 190 households, and 99 families living in the town. The population density was 1,374.4 inhabitants per square mile (528.2/km^{2}). There were 212 housing units at an average density of 295.8 per square mile (113.7/km^{2}). The racial makeup of the town was 94.42% White, 3.25% African American, 0.91% Asian, 0.61% Pacific Islander, and 0.81% from two or more races. Hispanic or Latino of any race were 0.71%.

Of the 190 households 18.9% had children under the age of 18 living with them, 46.3% were married couples living together, 5.3% had a female householder with no husband present, and 47.4% were non-families. 40.0% of households were one person and 7.4% were one person aged 65 or older. The average household size was 2.11 and the average family size was 2.90.

The age distribution was 7.9% under the age of 18, 64.0% from 18 to 24, 10.4% from 25 to 44, 11.4% from 45 to 64, and 6.4% 65 or older. The median age was 21 years. For every 100 females there were 107.8 males. For every 100 females age 18 and over, there were 109.5 males.

The median household income was $36,375 and the median family income was $61,250. Males had a median income of $36,786 versus $23,750 for females. The per capita income for the town was $10,769. About 3.9% of families and 11.1% of the population were below the poverty line, including 12.4% of those under age 18 and 3.4% of those age 65 or over.

== Notable people ==
- Alexander Campbell, early leader of the Restoration Movement in Bethany and founder of Bethany College
- Ira Rodgers, football, baseball, and basketball star at West Virginia University. Later head coach of both the football and baseball teams.
- Jimmy Willis (politician), member of the West Virginia House of Delegates and resident of Bethany
