= Buffalo Creek and Gauley Railroad =

Coal-mining railroad based in West Virginia

Coordinates: 38°27′44″N 81°04′19″W

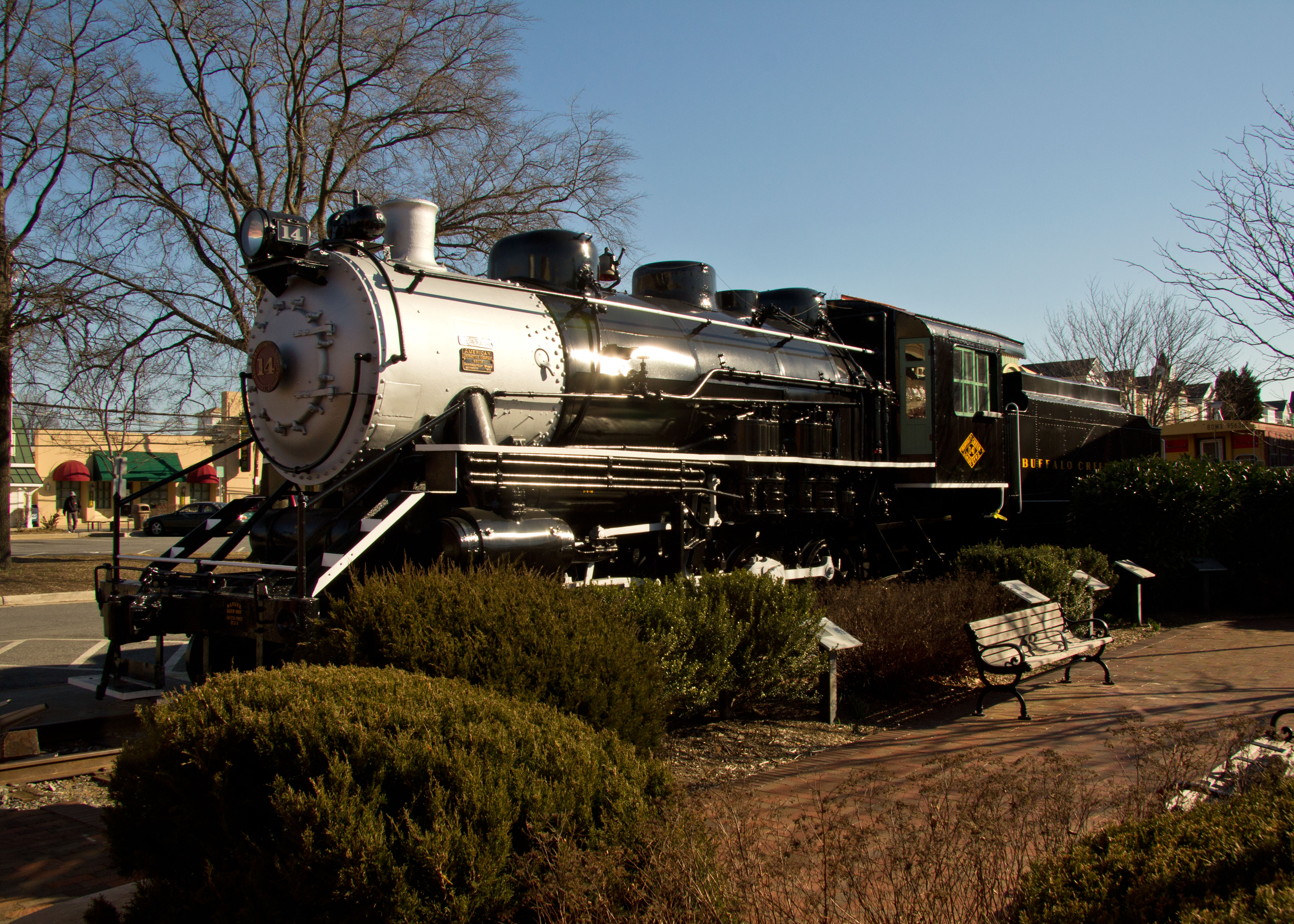
- Preserved 2-8-0 #14 at the Gaithersburg Community Museum in Gaithersburg, Maryland.

Overview
- Locale: Clay County, West Virginia
- Dates of operation: 1904–1965
- Successor: Elk River Railroad

Technical
- Track gauge: 4 ft 8 1/2 in (1,435 mm) standard gauge
- Length: 18-mile (29 km) mainline

The Buffalo Creek and Gauley Railroad (BC&G) was a railroad chartered on April 1, 1904 and ran along Buffalo Creek in Clay County, West Virginia. The original Buffalo Creek and Gauley ended service in 1965.

The BC&G was one of the last all-steam railroads, never operating a diesel locomotive to the day it shut down on February 27, 1965. Its primary purpose was to bring coal out of the mountains above Widen to an interchange with the Baltimore and Ohio Railroad at Dundon.

== Route ==
Beginning at Dundon, the line ran east along Buffalo Creek to a terminus 18 miles (29 km) away at Widen. Along the way, it passed marked locations at Avoca, Sand Fork, the company towns of Cressmont and Swandale, and Eakle. Swandale contained the sawmill for lumber operations of the Elk River Coal and Lumber Company (ERC&L) and there was a small dairy at Cressmont. The railroad terminates at the Rich Run Coal mine yard in Widen.

At Avoca, the ERC&L logging line ran about 9 miles (14 km) out in the woods where the logging was done during the final years of operations.

After the BC&G ended operations in 1965, it was reactivated in 1971 by the Majestic Mining Company to serve a mine at Widen. The company used an Alco S-2 for power on the formerly all-steam route; the operation concluded in 1985. The line was again reactivated in the mid-1990s when the Elk River Railroad, Inc. (TERRI) reopened the route to Avoca to serve a mine there. The operation lasted until 1999, when American Electric Power (AEP) determined the coal to be too poor in quality.

== Equipment ==
Some of the BC&G's equipment, as well as that of its sister railroad the Elk River Coal & Lumber Co. have been preserved, some in operating condition.

BC&G Consolidation #4 was owned by the North Carolina Transportation Museum in Spencer, North Carolina. It operated in tourist service until 2001. It was subsequently purchased by the Durbin & Greenbrier Valley Railroad, which intends to restore it for operation between Durbin and Cass, West Virginia.

BC&G Consolidation #13 is owned by Jerry Joe Jacobson and is stored at the Age of Steam Roundhouse in Sugarcreek, Ohio, where it, along with all other equipment in the roundhouse, can be viewed by the public on tours the museum offers. Consolidation #14 is on static display outside Gaithersburg, Maryland's commuter rail station.

ERC&L Shay #19 is on display in Ohio. Climax #3 is owned by the Roaring Camp and Big Trees Narrow Gauge Railroad in California, but is not serviceable.

The ERC&L's American log loader and bobber logging caboose are both restored and on display at the Cass Scenic Railroad State Park in Cass, West Virginia.

BC&G Mikado #17 had been initially preserved on the Livonia, Avon and Lakeville Railroad but was scrapped in 1970 following the locomotive's sale to a private owner who found it to be mechanically irreparable.

At one time the Elk River Railroad ran modern diesels from Gassaway, through Dundon and a branch to a coal loading facility at Avoca then from Dundon to Hartland.

== Restoration ==
Currently the Buffalo Creek & Gauley Co-op has been in the process of opening up much of the old main line and have run some speeder excursions from Dundon. The Clay County Economic Development Authority has established a pedal-train excursion on the line and is working toward a restoration of the rails to Widen. Much of the line was destroyed by flooding in 2016.
