= Elk River Railroad =

Railroad in West Virginia, United States

The Elk River Railroad (reporting mark ELKR) was a short line operating out of Gassaway, West Virginia that ran for 61.8 miles (99.5 km) between Gilmer, West Virginia and Hartland, West Virginia, and an additional 18.6 miles (29.9 km) between Dundon, West Virginia and Widen, West Virginia.

== History ==
The ELKR has existed since July 1989, although it was originally built in the late 19th century and was once part of the Coal and Coke Railway, formally the Charleston Clendendin and Sutton Railroad, that ran from Charleston to Elkins, and later the Baltimore and Ohio Railroad. By 2022, the railroad had abandoned all trackage south of the rail yard in Gassaway, West Virginia. There were two different rail lines in this section of track, the ex-B&O Elk Subdivision, from Gassaway to Hartland, which was ripped up in December 2020, and the 18.6-mile section of the former Buffalo Creek and Gauley Railroad, which was acquired by the West Virginia Rail Authority in November 2020. The Elk Sub was purchased from CSX by Bill Bright in 1989, and if he had not stepped in, this section of railroad would have most certainly been abandoned.

In the 1990s, the railroad seemed to have a very high promise of profitability. Bill Bright, the owner of the railroad, invested a considerable amount of money to rehabilitate over 100 miles of ex-B&O track, and 3 miles of ex-BC&G track to Class-II standards, with max speeds of 15 miles per hour. There was a steady stream of coal coming from a mining loadout on the old BC&G, and talk of potential expansion to other mines, other business shipped by rail, and connections to Conrail. Unfortunately, all of this changed in 1999, when the line's single source of traffic, the mine loadout in Avoca, ceased operations, due to the customer American Electric Power (AEP) deeming the quality of coal produced there to be "too poor", effectively destroying the line's only source of traffic.

Today, there is no potential for shipment of coal from Clay County since the shutdown in Avoca. If another source of traffic is found, trains would never run again.

Currently, the railroad rostered secondhand "Geep" locomotives; GP10s, #1-2, GP8 #3, and GP9s #4-5, although, according to employees of the railroad, not every locomotive was operational. As of about 2020, Jim Smith was in charge of the Car Repair Crew in the Gassaway Rail Yard.

On November 14, 2020, the West Virginia Rail Authority filed with the Surface Transportation Board to acquire and operate 18 miles of former Buffalo Creek & Gauley trackage between Wilden and Dundon, West Virginia. The WVRA plans to operate the line as a Class III common carrier after December 14, 2020. The line suffered a significant washout in 2016, and has not seen a train since 1999. In December 2020, the ELKR began the process of ripping up the line south of Gassaway.

As of the former BC&G right-of-way, according to an article, "Clay County residents formed a non-profit, the Clay County Business Development Authority, and began to work with the State of West Virginia to buy the right-of-way of the former BC&G. The organization procured rail bikes from RailRiders of Leadville, Colorado, as well as a small fleet of track speeders and open-air passenger trailers to be pulled by the speeders. After restoring and re-laying six miles of flood-damaged tack, the group began offering motorized and pedal-powered rail excursions along Buffalo Creek from a base next to the Bardley Campground and Lodge. The authority has also received a grant to rehabilitate 15 miles of BC&G trackage, and has plans to eventually acquire a rail bus."

After more than 20 years of storing cars and carrying out occasional car repairs the Elk River Railroad finally called it quits. Operations were formally suspended over the winter of 2022 and much of the Gassaway Yard trackage is currently being dismantled. It will only be a matter of time before the remaining segment of the old Coal & Coke between Gassaway and Gilmer is formally abandoned and converted into a trail. All 5 locomotives have been acquired by the West Virginia Central and its operator Durbin & Greenbrier Valley Railroad.

== Locomotive Roster ==
Locomotive Number	Model Designation	Status	Notes
#1	EMD GP10	Operational	Built 1957 as GP9 IC 9337, rebuilt as GP10 8337
#2	EMD GP10	Non-Operational	Built 1954 as GP9 IC 9060, rebuilt as GP10 8060
#3	EMD GP8	Operational	Built 1952 as GP7 WAB 475, rebuilt as IT 1750; now DVGR 24 and painted in Western Maryland colors
#4	EMD GP9	Non-Operational	Built 1959 as NW 872
#5	EMD GP9	Non-Operational	Built 1959 as NW 885
