= Buffalo Creek and Gauley 4 =

Preserved American 2-8-0 locomotive

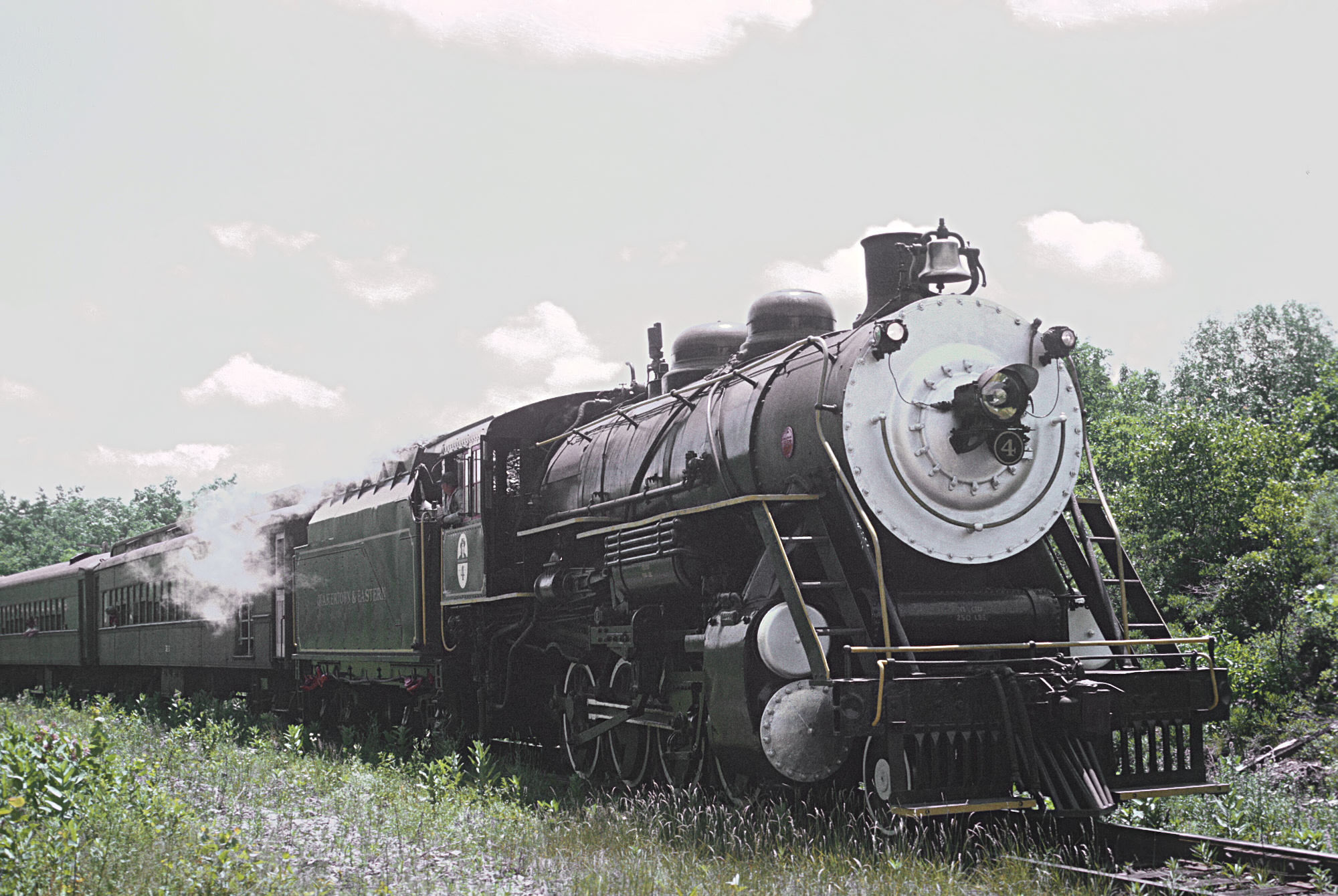
- No. 4 pulling an excursion train for the Quakertown and Eastern Railroad in 1969
Type and origin
- Power type: Steam
- Builder: Baldwin Locomotive Works
- Serial number: 59472
- Build date: September 1926
Specifications
- Configuration
  - Whyte: 2-8-0
  - UIC: 1'D
- Driver dia.: 50 in (1,300 mm)
- Wheelbase: 57.25 ft (17.45 m)
  - Engine: 23.33 ft (7.11 m)
  - Drivers: 14.25 ft (4.34 m)
- Adhesive weight: 171,000 lb (78,000 kg)
- Loco weight: 194,000 lb (88,000 kg)
- Tender weight: 124,000 lb (56,000 kg)
- Total weight: 318,000 lb (144,000 kg)
- Fuel type: Coal
- Fuel capacity: 10 t (9.8 long tons; 11 short tons)
- Water cap.: 6,000 US gal (23,000 L; 5,000 imp gal)
- Firebox
  - Grate area: 49.50 sq ft (4.599 m^{2})
- Boiler pressure: 190 psi (1,300 kPa)
- Heating surface
  - Firebox: 208 sq ft (19.3 m^{2})
- Cylinders: Two, outside
- Cylinder size: 22 in × 28 in (560 mm × 710 mm)
- Valve gear: Walschaerts
Performance figures
- Tractive effort: 43,773 lb (19,855 kg)
- Factor of adh.: 3.91
Career
- Operators: Buffalo Creek and Gauley Railroad; Quakertown and Eastern Railroad; Southwest Virginia Scenic Railroad; North Carolina Transportation Museum
- Numbers: BC&G 4; Q&E 4; SVSR 4; SOU 604
- Nicknames: Ol' Slobber Face
- Retired: February 27, 1965 (revenue service); November 2001 (1st excursion service)
- Restored: 1967 (1st excursion service)
- Current owner: Durbin and Greenbrier Valley Railroad
- Disposition: Undergoing restoration to operating condition

Buffalo Creek and Gauley Railroad 4 is a preserved 2-8-0 "Consolidation" type steam locomotive. It was constructed by the Baldwin Locomotive Works in 1926 as the only locomotive to be bought-new by the Buffalo Creek and Gauley Railroad. It served the railroad by pulling coal and lumber trains throughout Clay County, West Virginia until it was retired in 1965. No. 4 was restored to operating condition by the Quakertown and Eastern Railroad for excursion service in Pennsylvania, and it made its way to the North Carolina Transportation Museum in 1978.

No. 4 was subsequently used to pull tourist trains across the museum's property in Spencer, North Carolina from when its multi-year overhaul was completed in 1986 to when its flue time expired in 2001. The locomotive spent fourteen years in storage, waiting for a rebuild that never came to fruition. In 2015, No. 4 was purchased by the Durbin and Greenbrier Valley Railroad, who moved it to their shops with the hopes of restoring it to run it on their trackage between Durbin and Cass, West Virginia.

== History ==
=== Revenue service (1926–1965) ===
In the mid-1920s, the Ferrocarril Mexicano (Mexican Railway) ordered a new type of steam locomotive from the Baldwin Locomotive Works of Philadelphia, Pennsylvania. This new steam locomotive was an oil-fired 2-8-0 "Consolidation" type, and it was planned to be numbered as No. 200. However, by the time the locomotive rolled out of the factory in September 1926, J.G. Bradley made a deal with Baldwin, and the locomotive was instead sold to the Buffalo Creek and Gauley Railroad (BC&G).

It would become one of only five locomotives to ever be purchased-new by the BC&G, as the rest of the locomotives they had rostered were purchased-used. After arriving in Clay County, West Virginia, the locomotive was modified with the BC&G's own features; it was renumbered to 4, it was converted to burn coal, the headlight was moved from the top to the center of the smokebox door, and a cylindrical air tank was installed on the pilot. The cowcatcher was also changed in later years.

No. 4 was first assigned to haul coal and lumber between Widen, Swandale, and Dundon, where the trains it pulled would often interchange with the Baltimore and Ohio Railroad. Sometimes, it would also pull passenger cars to carry coal miners and railroad men between their homes and the mines. During revenue service, the locomotive became one of the most photographed steam locomotives in the Eastern United States. No. 4 made its last run for the BC&G on February 27, 1965, as the railroad ended operations altogether that same day. The locomotive would subsequently be stored cold for the next two years.

=== Early preservation (1967–1977) ===
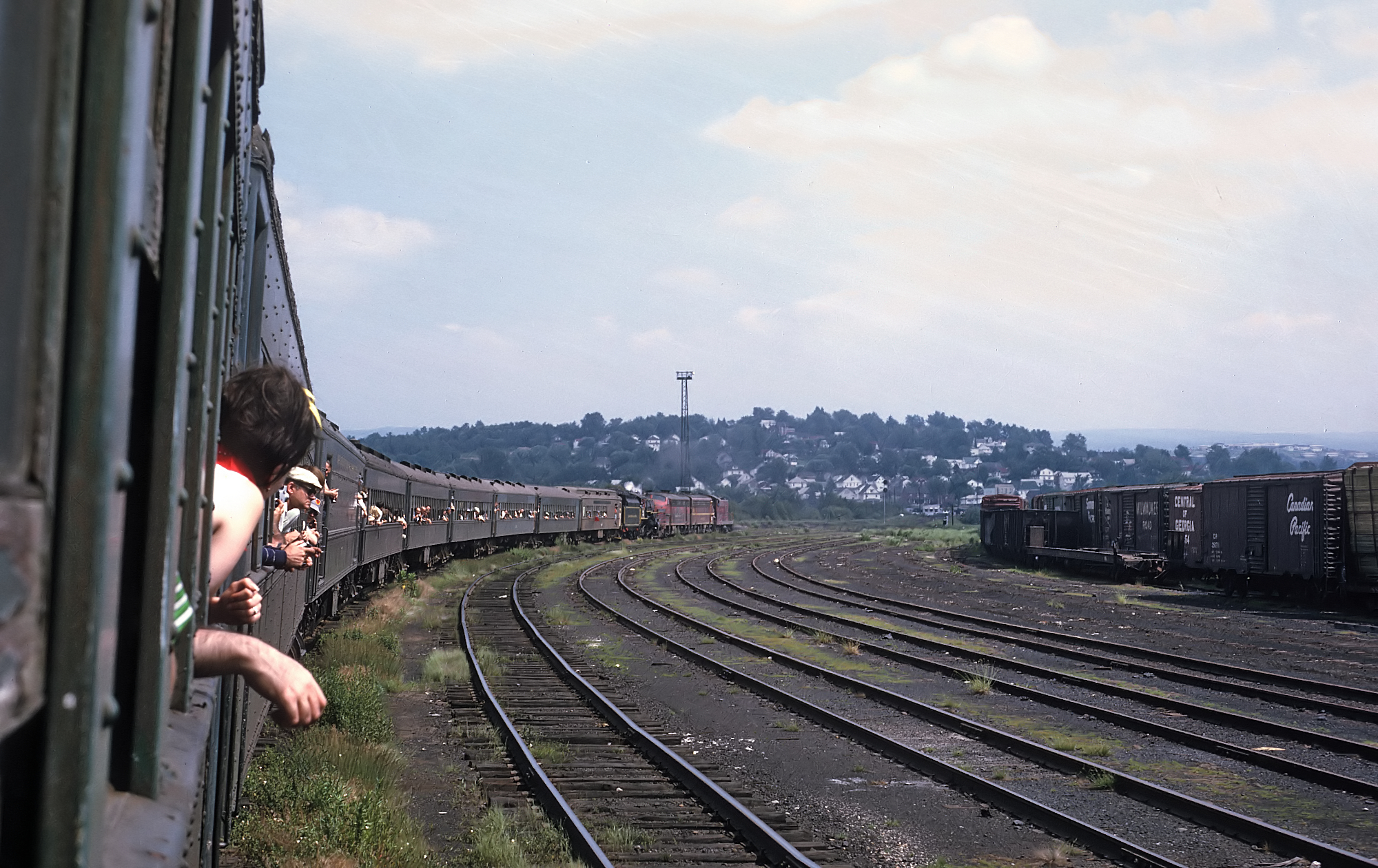
No. 4 pulling an excursion train for the Quakertown and Eastern while being assisted by some Lehigh Valley EMD F7 locomotives in 1969

In 1967, No. 4 was sold to Francis Ede, who moved it to Bethlehem, Pennsylvania for use on his Quakertown and Eastern Railroad (Q&E). Repairs were made to the locomotive at the Reading Company's Bethlehem Engine Terminal, and beginning in April 1968, the locomotive pulled several mainline excursion trains across the state of Pennsylvania on the Reading, the Lehigh Valley, the Lehigh and Hudson River, and the Penn Central. In 1970, William Young began calling No. 4 "Ol' Slobber Face", since moisture was constantly falling from the smokestack, resulting in most of the smokebox area to be continuously wet while operational. Many other crews also began to call No. 4 by this nickname as a result. However, 1970 was also the year Francis ceased all operations on the Q&E, and No. 4 was stored out of service again.

In February 1972, No. 4 was sold along with the Q&E's Ex-Reading passenger car fleet to Carter-Cash Enterprises, a company owned by famous Country singer Johnny Cash. Carter-Cash had possible plans to create a tourist attraction in southwest Virginia near the former home of the Carter Family of Country Music Fame. These plans never materialized for No. 4. In 1974, the locomotive and passenger car fleet was sold again to the Southwest Virginia Scenic Railroad (SVSR). The SVSR was formerly used as part of the Southern Railway's Bristol branch line that lied between Mendota and Bristol before it became a tourist railroad that was shortened to lay between Mendota and Hiltons. Upon arrival in Mendota, No. 4 was fired up again, and it began pulling tourist trains over the SVSR's trackage, but this operation only lasted one year. By the end of 1975, the SVSR filed for bankruptcy as a result of low ridership.

=== North Carolina Transportation Museum (1978–2015) ===
In 1978, the North Carolina Transportation Museum (NCTM) purchased No. 4 and the SVSR's passenger car fleet, and they moved them to their museum grounds in Spencer, North Carolina with the hopes of using them for their own tourist operations. The NCTM decided to give No. 4 a multi-year overhaul to ensure that the locomotive would be in good mechanical condition while operational on their trackage. They also decided to repaint the locomotive and renumber it to 604, in order to masquerade it as a Southern Railway Ks-1 class. The overhaul had an estimated cost of $500,000. In 1986, No. 604 was steamed up once again, and the NCTM began using it to pull their three-mile on-site tourist trains alongside Graham County Railroad Shay No. 1925.

As time flew by, No. 604 became one of the NCTM's star attractions. Some further modifications were also made to it during the early 1990s; the number font on the tender was changed, the color of the smokebox was darkened, and the centered headlight was lowered by a few inches. In 1995, during the 30th anniversary of the locomotive's finale run on the BC&G, it was repainted to its original identity as BC&G No. 4 for a "BC&G Reunion Day". Six replicas of the original circular numberplate were made, and one of them was given to the locomotive, whereas the rest of them were given away to participants of the occasion. By the end of 1995, the locomotive became Southern No. 604 again while it resumed tourist service for the NCTM. Its last run for the museum occurred in November 2001 before it was sidelined to receive an overhaul as required by new regulations of the Federal Railroad Administration (FRA).

No. 604 was moved inside the NCTM's Spencer shops for some flue replacing, but the locomotive ended up being further torn down, as several parts needed to be replaced, including the smokebox. Meanwhile, its tender was put on static display behind Southern 2-8-0 No. 542, which would also be renumbered to 604 during that time. By the early 2010s, the rebuild on No. 604 was cancelled in favor of the NCTM's higher priorities, including the rebuild of Norfolk and Western 4-8-4 No. 611. The locomotive would remain stored, disassembled for one more year.

=== Durbin and Greenbrier Valley Railroad (2015–present) ===
In 2015, the Durbin and Greenbrier Valley Railroad (D&GVR) announced that they would purchase No. 604 for $150,000 from the NCTM's foundation with the goal of restoring it for operational purposes on their own trackage in West Virginia in its original BC&G livery. During the summer of that year, the locomotive's boiler was separated from the frame and running gear, and they were each loaded onto separate trucks with oversized load banners. The cab and the tender were also loaded onto separate trucks. By the end of the year, No. 604 has arrived in the Cass Scenic Railroad's trackage, and it has touched West Virginia soil for the first time since it was removed from the BC&G's trackage in 1967. Volunteers have made thickness measurements on the area of the boiler that needed repair work, and they were beginning to come up with a plan of action to complete the restoration. In the summer of 2016, No. 604 was moved inside the D&GVR's locomotive shops in Cass, so that restoration work would begin.

Restoration was planned to be completed in September 2016 during the locomotive's 90th birthday, but due to their efforts being concentrated on their geared shay locomotives, work on No. 604 has been postponed as time flew by. Although they have inspected the running gear, the frame, and the tender, which were all deemed to be in good condition, the firebox and both flue sheets in the boiler needed to either be repaired or to be replaced, in order to meet FRA standards. In February 2022, the D&GVR reached an agreement with the Sistersville Tank Works Incorporated of Sistersville, West Virginia to construct a brand new boiler for the locomotive, since the original boiler is in poor condition as a result of being used for several decades. After construction of the new boiler is completed, restoration work on the locomotive is estimated to take one year to complete. Once the locomotive is operational again, it will be renumbered back to 4, and it will pull the fifteen-mile excursion trains between Cass and Durbin, West Virginia.

== See also ==
- Lake Superior and Ishpeming 18
- Grand Canyon Railway 29
- Western Maryland Scenic Railroad 734
- Southern Railway 154
- Southern Railway 385
- Southern Railway 401
- Southern Railway 630
- Southern Railway 722
- Great Smoky Mountains Railroad 1702
- Tennessee Valley Railroad 610
- Illinois Central 790
- Great Western 60
