= Southern Railway 107 =

Preserved American steam locomotive

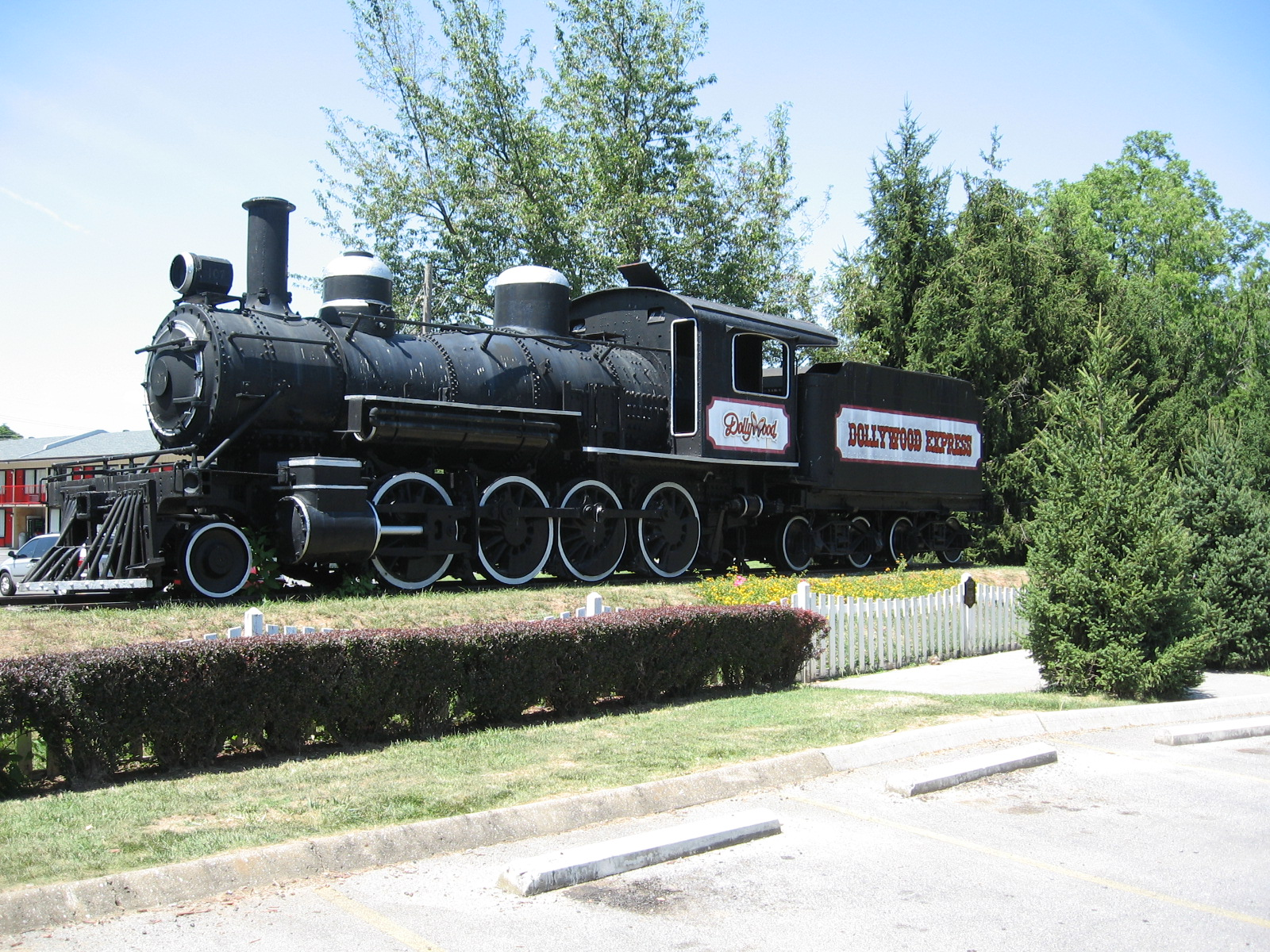
- Southern Railway 107 on display at Dollywood in 2008
Type and origin
- Power type: Steam
- Builder: Baldwin Locomotive Works
- Serial number: 8869
- Build date: November 1887
Specifications
- Configuration
  - Whyte: 2-8-0
- Gauge: 4 ft 8 1/2 in (1,435 mm)
- Driver dia.: 50 in (1.270 m)
- Fuel type: Coal
- Boiler pressure: 150 psi (1.03 MPa)
- Cylinders: Two, outside
- Cylinder size: 20 in × 24 in (508 mm × 610 mm)
- Valve gear: Stephenson
- Valve type: Piston valves
- Loco brake: Air
- Train brakes: Air
- Couplers: Knuckle
Performance figures
- Tractive effort: 24,500 lbf (109 kN)
Career
- Operators: East Tennessee, Virginia & Georgia Railroad; Southern Railway; Smoky Mountain Railroad
- Class: G
- Numbers: ETV&G 419; SOU 107; SMR 107
- Retired: 1942 (revenue service); December 9, 1954 (excursion service)
- Restored: May 17, 1947
- Current owner: Knoxville and Holston River Railroad
- Disposition: Undergoing evaluation for possible restoration

Southern Railway 107 is a G class 2-8-0 "Consolidation" type steam locomotive built in November 1887 by Baldwin Locomotive Works (BLW) for the Southern Railway (SOU).

== History ==
=== Revenue service ===
No. 107 first worked on the East Tennessee, Virginia & Georgia Railroad (ETV&G) as their No. 419. In 1894, the ETV&G and the Richmond and Danville Railroad (R&D) merged to create the Southern Railway (SOU) and No. 419 was renumbered to No. 107. The locomotive continued service with the Southern until being retired in 1942 when the Smoky Mountain Railroad (SMR) purchased No. 107, retaining its number, in order to handle increased traffic during its "boom days", brought about by the construction of the TVA Douglas Dam Project on the French Broad River near Sevierville. The SMRR hauled materials to the construction site, and the contract netted huge sums of revenue for the road, leading to the only period of prosperity in its history. Unscrupulous managers, however, were more into lining their own pockets than in the welfare of the railroad. The No. 107 was purchased from a company owned by the Manager of the Smoky Mountain for $12,000.

The Consolidation served on through the steam era of the Smoky, taking a turn about with the line's other steamers. A washout on the line in January 1947, resulted in a "dead railroad" until May 17, 1947, when No. 107 rolled into town pulling a train of cars of foreign lines which had been stranded in Sevierville. On December 9, 1954, the SMRR brought in a GE 44 ton diesel to replace the steam locomotives and No. 107 along with the other SMRR steamers were left on a siding to rust.

=== Disposition ===
In 1961, No. 107 was placed on display in Sevierville along with 2-6-0 No. 206 (Baldwin, 1910) to advertise the Rebel Railroad (later Dollywood Express). In 2025, the locomotive was removed from display at the front entrance of Dollywood and moved to the Knoxville and Holston River Railroad (KXHR) to support the Mountain Ways Foundation.
