= 500 class =

500 class or Class 500 may refer to:

- GS&WR Class 500, 4-6-0 steam locomotives
- New South Wales 400/500 class railmotor
- Savannah and Atlanta 500 Class, 2-8-2 steam locomotives
- South Australian Railways 500 class (diesel)
- South Australian Railways 500 class (steam)
