= Smoky Mountain Railroad =

Overview
- Headquarters: Knoxville, Tennessee
- Reporting mark: SMR
- Locale: east Tennessee
- Dates of operation: 1909–1961

Technical
- Track gauge: 1,435 mm (4 ft 8 1/2 in)
- Length: 27.8 mi (44.7 km)

The Smoky Mountain Railroad (reporting mark SMR) was a standard gauge class-III shortline that operated from Knoxville, Tennessee, to Sevierville, Tennessee, from 1909 until 1961.

== History ==
The railroad was established by Knoxville contractor William J. Oliver, and was originally named the Knoxville, Sevierville and Eastern Railway. It was incorporated on July 15, 1907, and construction started in 1908. The first segment was opened between Vestal in South Knoxville and Sevierville on December 20, 1909, bringing the line's total length to 27.8 miles. The line connected with the Southern Railway at Knoxville. In July 1921, the bank foreclosed on the railroad and later sold it for $50,000 to L.C. Gunter on November 1, 1921. The line was then re-organized as the Knoxville & Carolina Railroad Company. The railroad was sold again at auction for $50,000 on May 1, 1926, but since the new owner intended to disband the company and sell off the assets, the sale was delayed. It was eventually purchased by the Tennessee and North Carolina Railroad and re-named the Smoky Mountain Railroad.

At the end of 1937, the T&NC sold their shares of the Smoky Mountain Railroad to Midwest Steel, a company that dealt in scrap iron. On April 11, 1938, the owners of the railroad applied for abandonment but the application was denied. The railroad changed ownership numerous times over years, as the line was never profitable and struggled to stay afloat with as few as 300 carloads of freight being shipped out of Sevierville annually, a volume of freight so low as to preclude profitable freight operations. The railroad's low speed (usually limited to 25 mph/40 kmph due to track conditions) made passenger service unprofitable once automobile ownership became widespread in the area, even though a custom self-propelled motorcar had been purchased in October 1922, for the then-huge sum of $16,000, and was used to make three daily runs between Sevierville and Knoxville.

World War II brought about the only notable period of profitability for the railroad, as the Tennessee Valley Authority initiated construction of Douglas Dam on the French Broad River a few miles north of Sevierville. A branch line was constructed from Sevierville to the dam site, and the Smoky Mountain Railroad hauled in most of the equipment and materials needed to construct the dam.

Once the dam was complete the railroad began to struggle anew, and by 1946 the line was again losing large sums of money. The stockholders of the railroad applied for abandonment in 1947, but the Interstate Commerce Commission denied the request. In 1951, passenger services ended. The railroad ended steam operations on December 9, 1954, with 1911 Baldwin 4-6-2 #110 (former Little River Railroad #110) pulling the last steam-powered train. This was due to the Southern Railway (on which the SMRR relied on for maintenance of their steam locomotives) ending all steam operations and subsequently dismantling their steam shops in Knoxville. The railroad then used a GE 44 ton diesel for motive power.

The railroad continued to operate until January 16, 1961, when operations were suspended due to poor track conditions. In May 1964, the ICC finally approved a request for abandonment.

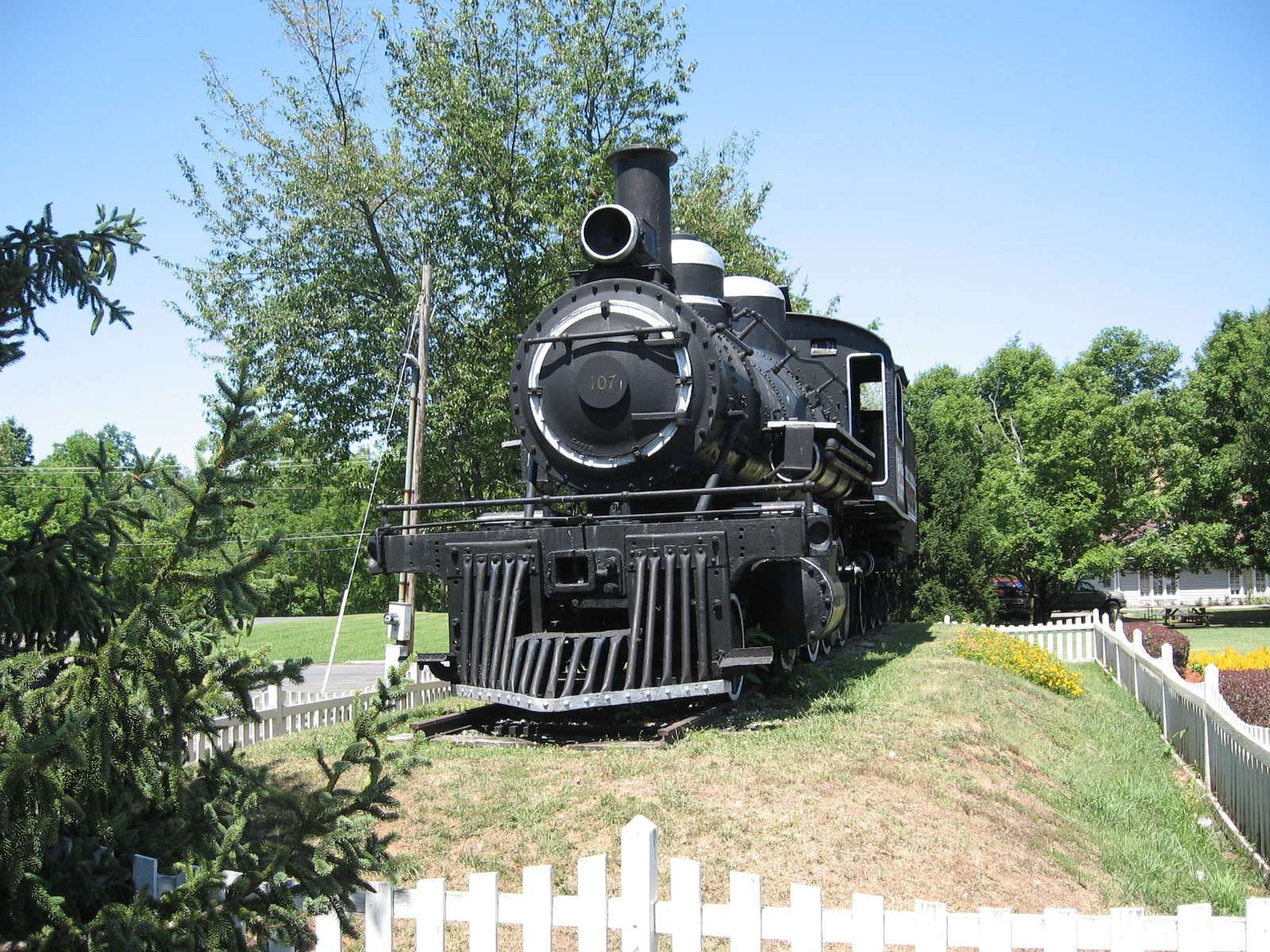
Smoky Mountain Railroad #107

In 1966, the track was taken up. The railroad is now completely gone. Several of the Smoky Mountain Railroad's former locomotives are still in existence. In 1961 steam locomotives #107, a 2-8-0; and #206, a 2-6-0; were sold to "Rebel Railroad", a narrow gauge tourist train line built at nearby Pigeon Forge for static display. Rebel Railroad changed ownership over the years and is today part of the Dollywood theme park. #107 is still displayed at the entrance to Dollywood, however #206 was sold to the "Chattanooga Choo-Choo Hotel" in Chattanooga, Tennessee, in the early 1970s.

4-6-2 #110, originally built for the Little River Railroad, is now at Coldwater, Michigan, operating on a tourist railroad.

== Locomotives ==
=== Locomotives owned by the railroad ===
Locomotive details
No.	Image	Wheel arrangement	Builder	Built	Retired	Notes
20		4-6-0	Baldwin Locomotive Works	1889	Unknown	This locomotive was used in the construction of the line and in the operations of the railroad. Not much is known about this engine.
34		4-4-0	Baldwin Locomotive Works	9/1883	Unknown	Built as Cincinnati Southern Railway #81. Later Cincinnati, New Orleans and Texas Pacific Railway #581. Renumbered at #545. Became Southern Railway #6401. Sold to the KS&E on September 14, 1918. Disposition unknown.
35		2-6-0	Baldwin Locomotive Works	8/1895	Unknown	Built as Mobile & Birmingham Railway #14, later became Southern #3001. Sold to the KS&E in April 1915. Disposition Unknown
36		4-6-0	Baldwin Locomotive Works	9/1897	Unknown	Built as Mobile & Birmingham Railway #16, later became Southern #704. Later 657, and finally 1378. Sold to the KS&E in 1915. Disposition Unknown.
100		4-4-0	Baldwin Locomotive Works	12/1883	Unknown	Built as Pennsylvania Railroad #232. Disposition Unknown
102		2-6-2	Lima Locomotive Works	12/1913	1943	Built as Tennessee and North Carolina Railway #5, later renumbered to 102. Sold to the SMRR in 1927. Scrapped for the scrap metal drives during World War 2 in 1943.
107		2-8-0	Baldwin Locomotive Works	11/1887	12/9/1954	Built as East Tennessee, Virginia and Georgia Railway #419. Became Southern #107 in 1894. Sold to the SMRR in 1942 to help with the construction of Douglas Dam. Retired December 9th, 1954. Now on display in Sevierville, Tennessee.
110		4-6-2	Baldwin Locomotive Works	11/1911	12/9/1954	Formerly Little River Railroad #110. Smallest pacific ever built in the world. Sold to the SMRR in 1940. Last steam locomotive to run on the SMRR in December 1954. Abandoned in 1966. Sold to the Little River Railroad in Michigan in 1975 where it's currently operating.
204		4-6-0	Pittsburgh Locomotive Works	1888	962	Built as Tennessee Midland Railroad #200, later became Nashville, Chattanooga and St. Louis Railway #304. Renumbered to 204 in 1915. Sold to the Knoxville & Carolina Railroad in December 1922. Disposition unknown.
206		2-6-0	Baldwin Locomotive Works	7/1910	12/9/1954	Built as Genesee and Wyoming Railroad #9. Sold to the Brooklyn Cooperage Company in 1918. Sold to the Tennessee & North Carolina Railroad in 1927. Transferred to the SMRR in 1938. Retired December 9th, 1954. Put on display with #107 in 1961. Sold to the Chattanooga Choo Choo Hotel in 1973 where it's still on display.

=== Locomotives leased by the railroad ===
Locomotive details
No.	Image	Wheel arrangement	Builder	Built	Retired	Notes
23		0-6-0	Baldwin Locomotive Works	1906	unknown	Tennessee Valley Authority (TVA) loaned (free of cost) its own Baldwin (1906) 0-6-0 #23 to the railroad. This engine would remain on the property for the duration of (Douglas) Dam's construction, and its tasks were limited to the trackage in the immediate vicinity of the dam. The 73-ton steam locomotive would collect cars deposited in sidings on the south bank of the river and then bring them to the north bank, where there was a plethora of sidings leading to a cement silo, machine shop, oil storage facility, and warehouse. The track to the shop area reached as much as 2.26%, putting the rather diminutive locomotive to work. The locomotive had previously been used in the construction of the Cherokee Dam on the North Carolina side of the mountains. Disposition unknown.
154		2-8-0	Schenectady Locomotive Works	1890	8/1953	Built as East Tennessee Virginia & Georgia Railroad #466, later went into Southern Railway ownership in 1894 and renumbered to 154. Leased to the Smoky Mountain Railroad in the early 1950s. Retired August 1953 and placed on display in Chilhowee Park. Restored to operation in 2010 and now runs on the Three Rivers Rambler.
440		44-ton switcher	General Electric	7/1940	2012	Originally built for the Great Northern Railway as their #51, later sold to a locomotive dealer named Bateson-Stolteto, then it was sold the A.J. King Lumber Company of Sevierville, Tennessee. Leased to the SMRR to replace the steam locomotives on December 9, 1954, at a rental rate of $500 per month. It last ran on the SMRR on January 16, 1961. Formerly rusting away in an industrial park in Fletcher, North Carolina, it was purchased by Jamie Haislip, roadmaster on the Walkersville Southern Railroad, and transported to the WSRR in December 2017 for restoration and operation.
3403		4-6-0	Cooke Locomotive Works	1882	1301	Built as East Tennessee, Virginia, and Georgia Railway #35, later to Southern Railway #689 in 1894. Renumbered to 1403 in 1903. Later to #3403 in 1910. Leased to the SMRR possibly during that time. Scrapped at the Coster Shops in July 1915.
