= Southern Railway 542 =

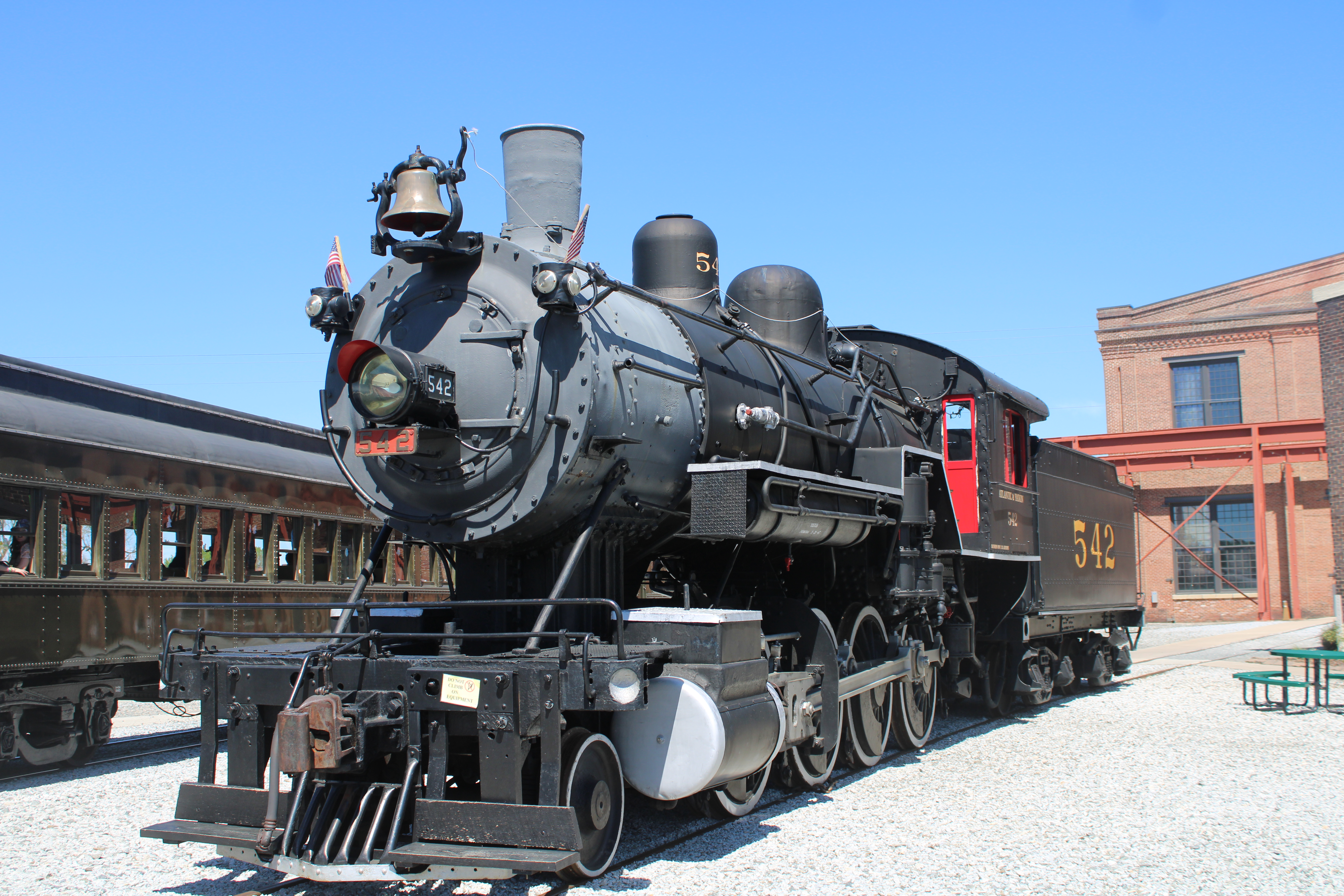
- No. 542 sitting at the North Carolina Transportation Museum in 2023.
Type and origin
- Power type: Saturated Steam
- Builder: Baldwin Locomotive Works
- Serial number: 22570
- Build date: 1903
Specifications
- Configuration
  - Whyte: 2-8-0
- Gauge: 4 ft 8 1/2 in (1,435 mm)
- Driver dia.: 57 in (1.448 m)
- Fuel type: Coal
- Boiler pressure: 200 psi (1.38 MPa)
- Cylinders: Two, with Outside Admission D-valves
- Cylinder size: 21 in × 28 in (533 mm × 711 mm)
- Valve gear: Stephenson
Performance figures
- Tractive effort: 37,485 lbf (166.74 kN)
Career
- Operators: Southern Railway
- Class: J
- Numbers: SOU 542; A&Y 542; SOU 604 (temporarily for the leatherheads movie)
- Retired: July 1953
- Current owner: North Carolina Transportation Museum
- Disposition: On static display

Southern Railway 542 is a J class 2-8-0 "Consolidation" type steam locomotive built in 1903 by the Baldwin Locomotive Works for the Southern Railway.

== History ==
No. 542 first operated in North Carolina on the Southern Railway in 1903, between the cities of Statesville and Winston-Salem. It was one of twenty-five similar locomotives built by Baldwin Locomotive Works in 1903 for the Southern to haul freight.

Between April 3–6, and August 23-24, 1937, the locomotive was leased to the Atlantic and Yadkin Railway (A&Y), a subsidiary company of Southern Railroad. In June 1946, the A&Y requested No. 542 once more, this time in replacement of its sibling locomotive No. 531, a locomotive leased to the A&Y by Southern. Although No. 542 needed $6,000.00 in boiler work, the A&Y convinced Southern, after several weeks of negotiations, to lease the locomotive. No. 542 was delivered a second time to the A&Y on June 14, 1946 and was transferred to lease in place of No. 531. After the A&Y ceased operations in 1950, No. 542 returned to the Southern.

After returning to Southern, No. 542's final assignment was being rostered in Spencer as a yard goat. No. 542 stayed on the job until July 1953 when it was retired from a revenue life of 50 years. In 1954, the Southern donated the locomotive to the Tanglewood Park in Clemmons, North Carolina for static display.

No. 542 remained in Clemmons until 1991, when it was traded for the ex-Illinois Central 0-8-0 No. 1894 by the North Carolina Transportation Museum. The locomotive was eventually given a cosmetic restoration, in order to be presentable to the general public at the N.C. Transportation Museum (NCTM) in Spencer, North Carolina. In 2007, the locomotive was renumbered to No. 604 while using a tender from Buffalo Creek and Gauley No. 4, in order to appear for the movie Leatherheads. As of 2024, the locomotive has been renumbered back to No. 542, and is on static display in Spencer, NC.
