= North Carolina Transportation Museum =

Transport museum in Spencer, North Carolina, United States

Coordinates: 35°41′13″N 80°26′10″W

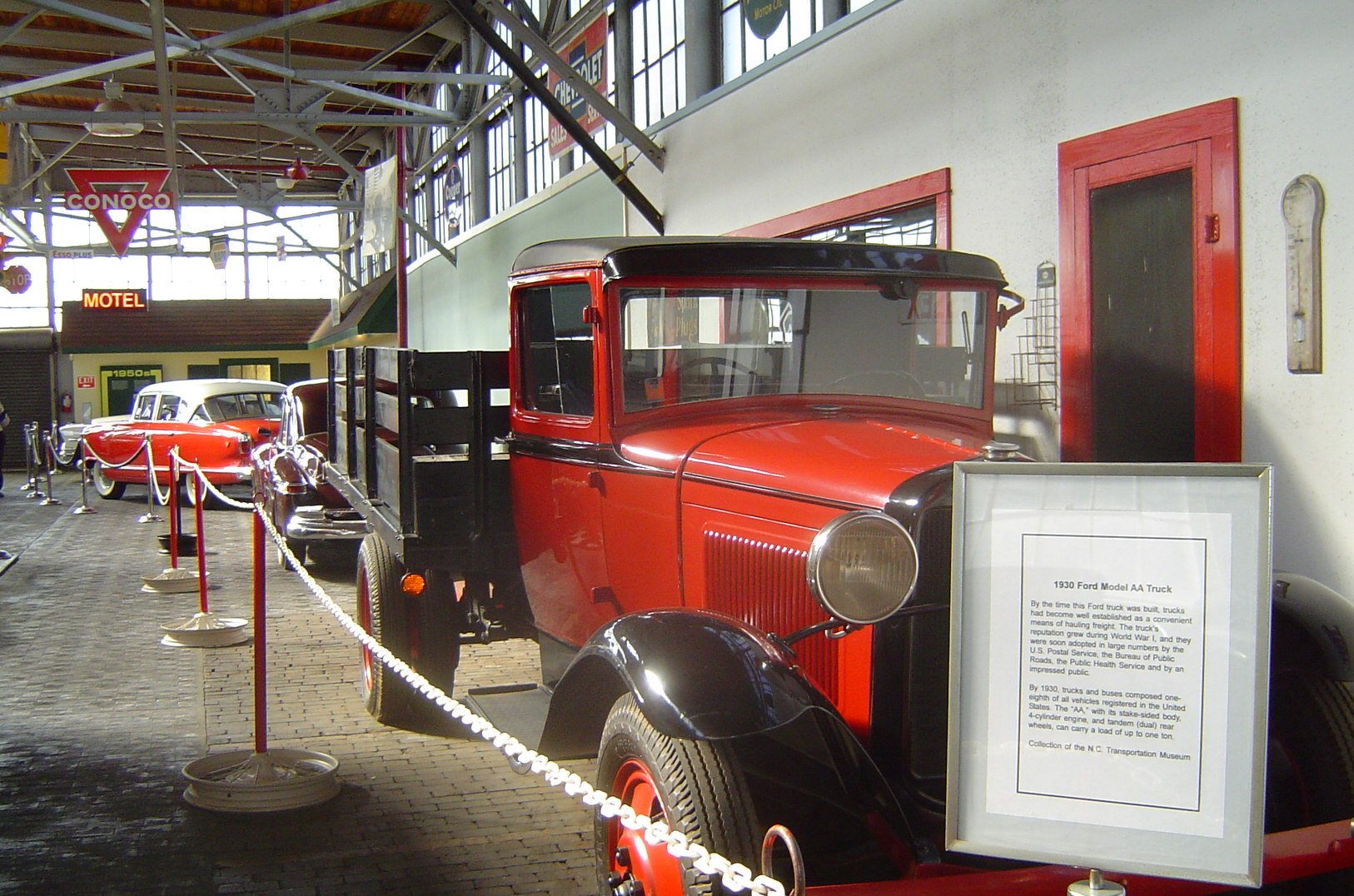
- Antique automobiles.
- Established: 1982
- Location: Spencer Shops
- Type: Transport museum
- Collection size: Railroad artifacts and equipment, road vehicles, airplanes.
- Website: http://www.nctrans.org

The North Carolina Transportation Museum is a museum in Spencer, North Carolina. It is a collection of automobiles, aircraft, and railway vehicles. The museum is located at the former Southern Railway Spencer Shops and devotes much of its space to the state's railroad history. The museum has the largest collection of rail relics in the Carolinas. Its Back Shop building of nearly three stories high is notable for its size, two football fields long.

== History ==
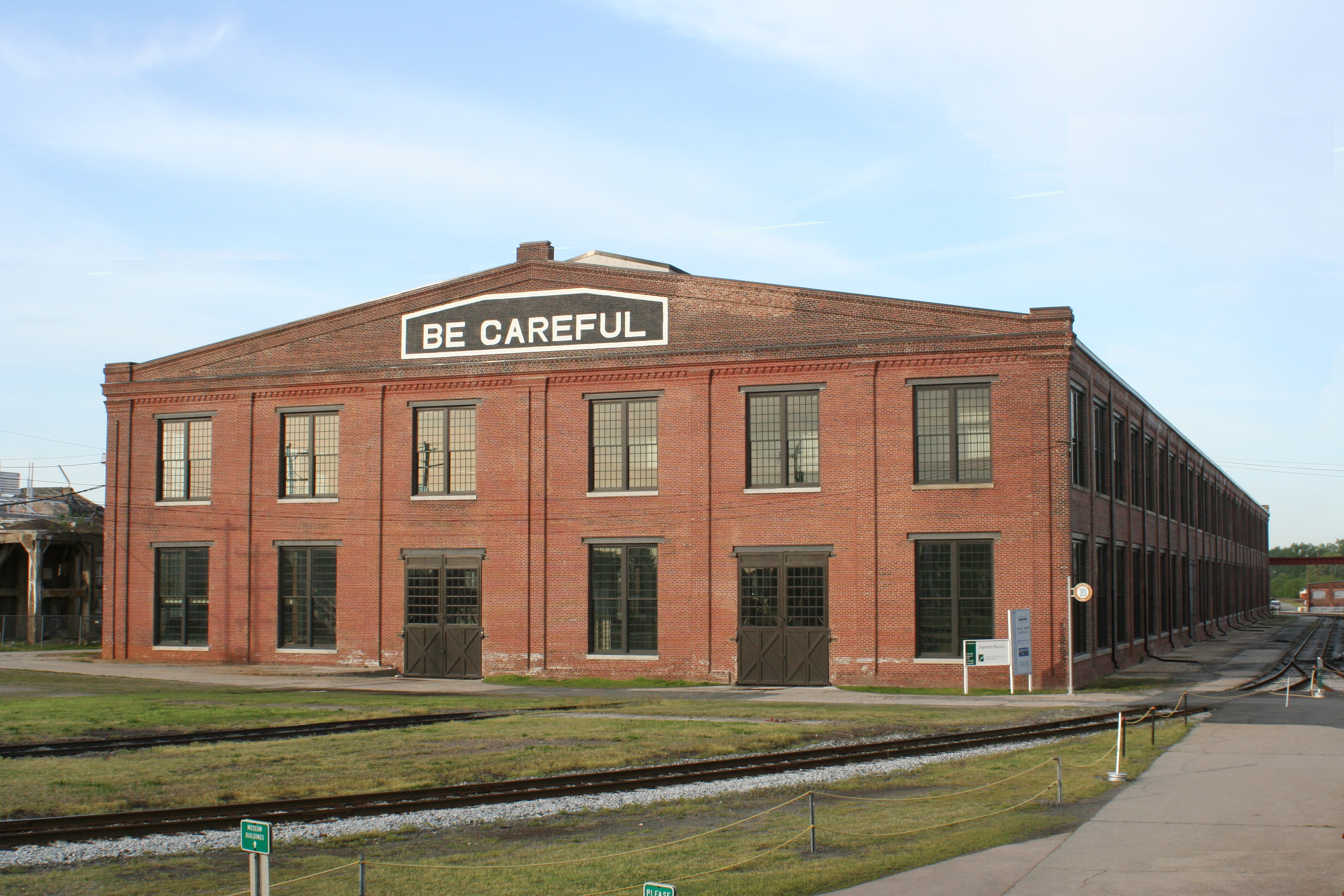
NCTM Back Shop

The museum was founded in 1977, when the Southern Railway deeded 4 acres (16,000 m^{2}) of land to North Carolina for a transportation museum. Two years later, another 53 acres (210,000 m^{2}) was added to the original donation; the entirety of the railway's largest former steam locomotive repair shops. The museum's first exhibit called People, Places and Time opened in 1983. The museum grew over the years, most notably in 1996, with the opening of Barber Junction, a relocated railroad depot from some 30 miles away, and the newly renovated Bob Julian Roundhouse. Barber Junction serves as the museum's Visitor Center and departure point for the on-site train ride. The Bob Julian Roundhouse serves as the hub for most of the museum's railroad exhibits, but also includes aviation exhibits and site history.

Several bays of the Spencer Shops roundhouse, built in 1924, are devoted to locomotives and rolling stock in the museum collection restored by volunteers. It was here that steam locomotives from 1924 to 1953 were repaired. In the first 16 stalls, visitors can walk among the massive locomotives and rail cars on display in an open-air setting. Moving into the enclosed Elmer Lam gallery in stalls 17 through 20, aviation exhibits dominate, with a full size replica Wright Flyer, Piedmont Airlines exhibits, and more. Moving into the restoration shop occupying stalls 21 through 32, visitors may also see volunteers working on various railroad pieces, and even manufacturing parts. The remaining five stalls are dedicated to additional enclosed exhibits.

The museum is the largest repository of rail relics in North and South Carolina and averages 80,000 visitors annually. About three-thousand people were employed to repair the trains at the Spencer Shops in the first half of the twentieth century. The Flue Shop, where all the flues for steam engines were formerly produced, has become the Bumper To Bumper exhibit, featuring vintage and antique cars. These include: several Model Ts, a Model A, and even a Ford Model R (the 1907 predecessor to the Model T). A Highway Patrol car from 1935, a Divco Milk Truck, a Lincoln Continental and others are also part of the museum's collection.

In 2005, the museum's Back Shop underwent a massive renovation, which included repairs to the roof, re-pointing of the brick, and a stabilization of the building's floor. This building, where the full overhaul of steam locomotives once took place, is notable for its size. It is two football fields long and nearly three stories tall. However, it may be more notable for the words "Be Careful," standing some three feet tall, visible from nearly anywhere on the north end of the site. In 2009, the museum opened the Back Shop to the public for the first time, with an access ramp on the south end. In 2017 the back shop was opened completely, allowing more exhibits.

== Heritage railroad ==
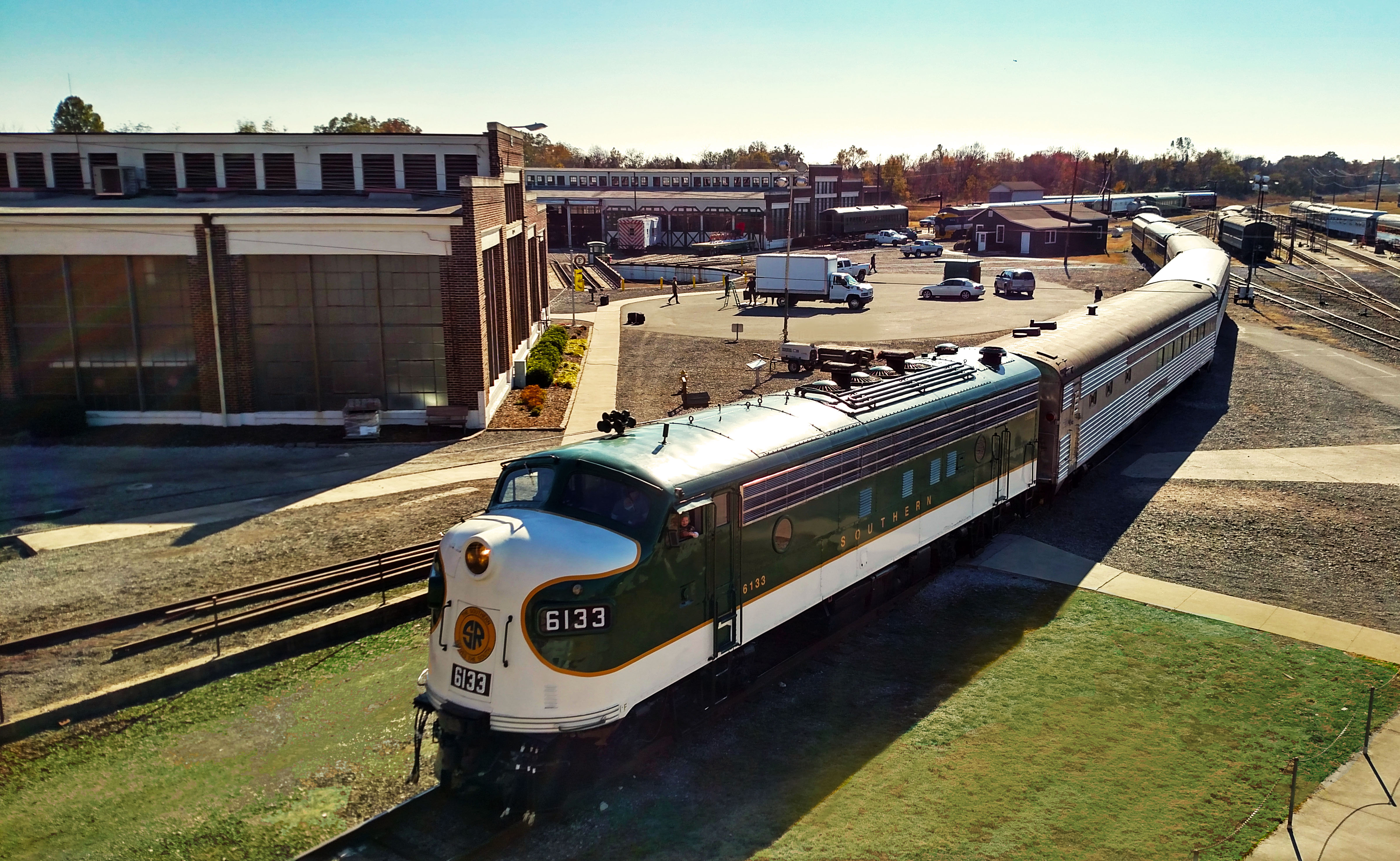
The Southern Railway #6133 FP7 Diesel Locomotive

The museum has a heritage railroad, which operates passenger excursion trains on a seasonal schedule. Trains are usually powered by either Norfolk and Western GP9 No. 620 or Southern GP30 No. 2601 diesel locomotives. Sometimes the Southern FP7 No. 6133, Southern E8A No. 6900, and Atlantic Coast Line E3 No. 501 streamlined diesel locomotives are used. The museum has no operating steam locomotives of its own, but occasionally has visiting steam locomotives such as Lehigh Valley Coal 0-6-0T No. 126, Flag Coal Company 0-4-0T No. 75, and Jeddo Coal Company 0-4-0T No. 85, all owned by the Gramling Locomotive Works of Ashley, Indiana.

In 2012 and 2013, the Tennessee Valley Railroad Museum's Southern 2-8-0 No. 630 visited the museum offering employee and public excursions to Barber Junction and Winston-Salem, North Carolina. From 2014 to 2015, the Norfolk and Western 611 (owned by the nearby Virginia Museum of Transportation) was restored to operating condition at the museum and ran public excursions departing from Spencer to destinations in Lynchburg, Virginia; Asheville, Charlotte, and Greensboro, North Carolina in 2016 and 2017. The No. 611 locomotive has also been used on site for "At The Throttle" and "Be The Fireman" sessions, cab rides, caboose rides, and pulled passenger train rides around the museum.

Also in 2015, the American 4-4-0 "Leviathan" locomotive visited the museum for the Lincoln Funeral Train event, commemorating 150 years since that event took place.

== Events ==
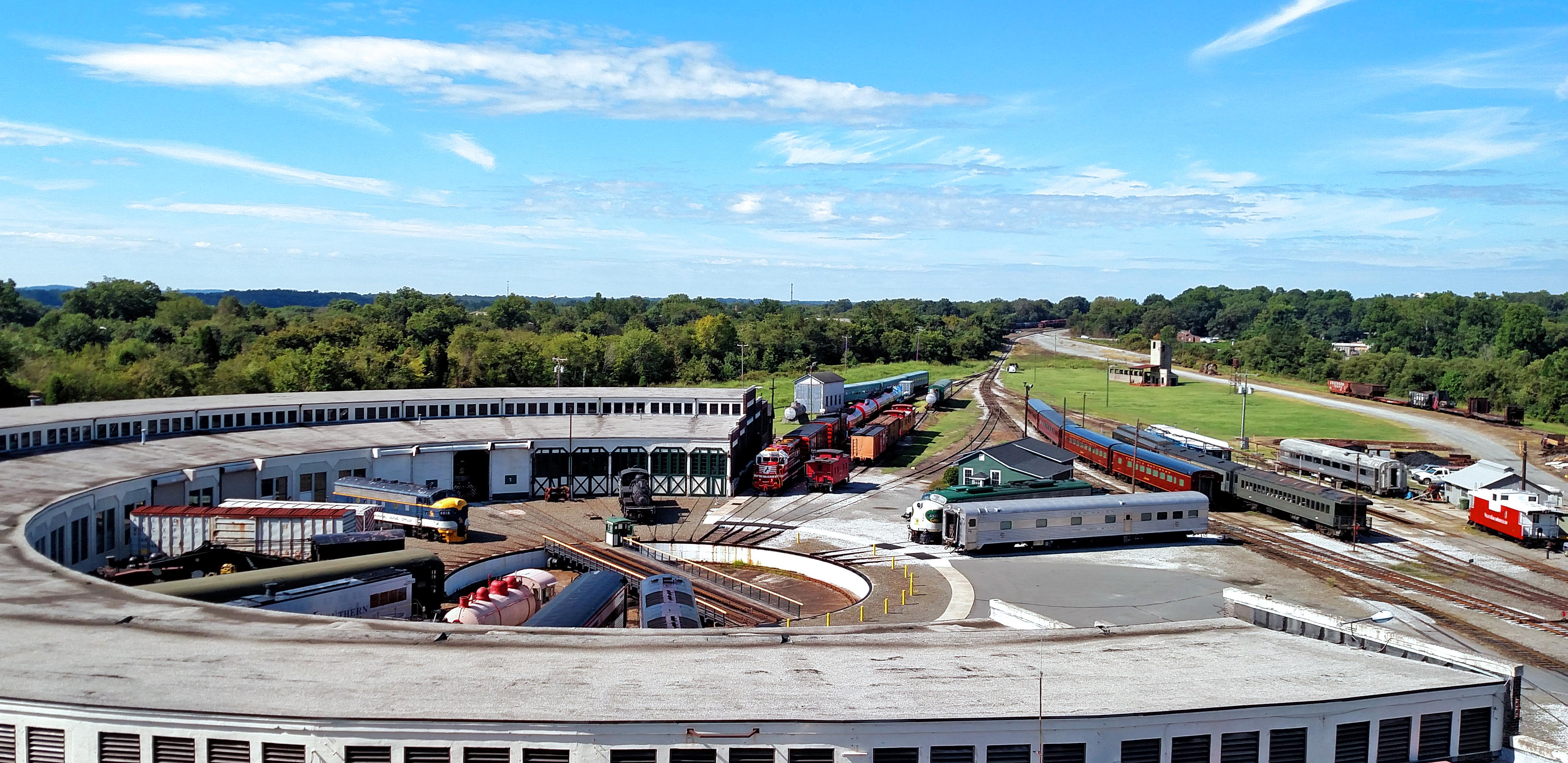
Bob Julian Roundhouse

The museum hosts a number of annual events and some one-time railroading events that bring rail fans from across the country. In 2012, the Bob Julian Roundhouse was the stage for all 20 of Norfolk Southern's Heritage locomotives during a two-day photographic event. In 2014, the museum hosted Streamliners at Spencer, with notable 1930s - 1950s era locomotives gathered around the Bob Julian Roundhouse turntable for a four-day event. Streamliners at Spencer included the No. 611 steam locomotive, visiting from the Virginia Museum of Transportation. This notable locomotive remained in Spencer for repair and restoration work to allow it to once again pull passenger excursions across the southeast.In August 2026, the museum hosted the America 250 Locomotive Celebration, gathering notable locomotives painted for the U.S. Semiquincentennial for a three-day event.

Annual events include Day Out With Thomas, the Polar Express, Fire Truck Show, Automobile shows, A Tractor Show, the Harvest Festival, the Easter Bunny Express, Valentine Wine and Dine trains, and the new Brew and Choo Beer Train. The NCTM is also host to Boy Scout Rail Camp, which allows for Boy Scouts and Leaders to camp out on the historic facility and earn the railroading merit badge. It is the largest railroad related scouting event in the nation.

== Collection ==
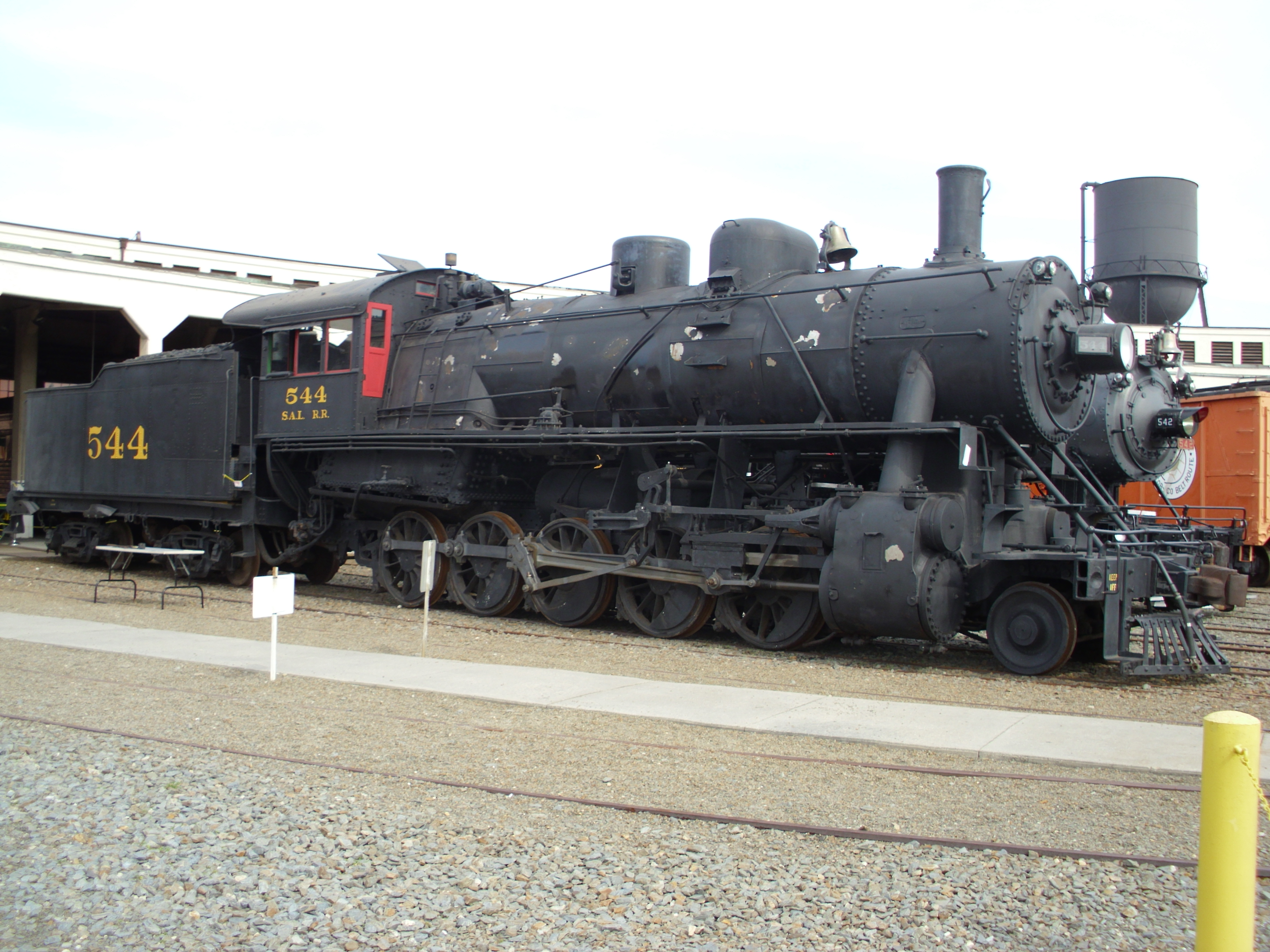
Seaboard Air Line #544, one of over 200 undelivered Russian Decapods.

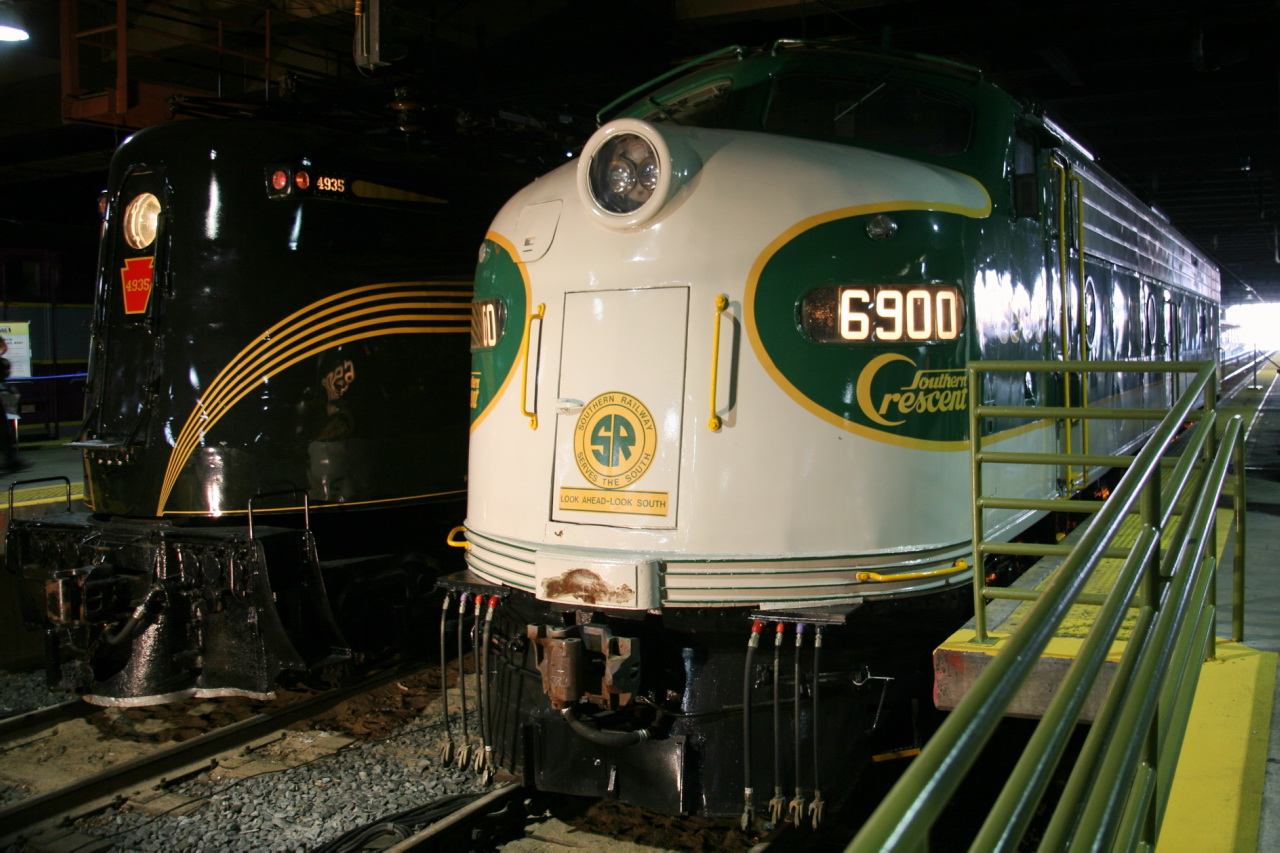
Southern E-Unit # 6900.

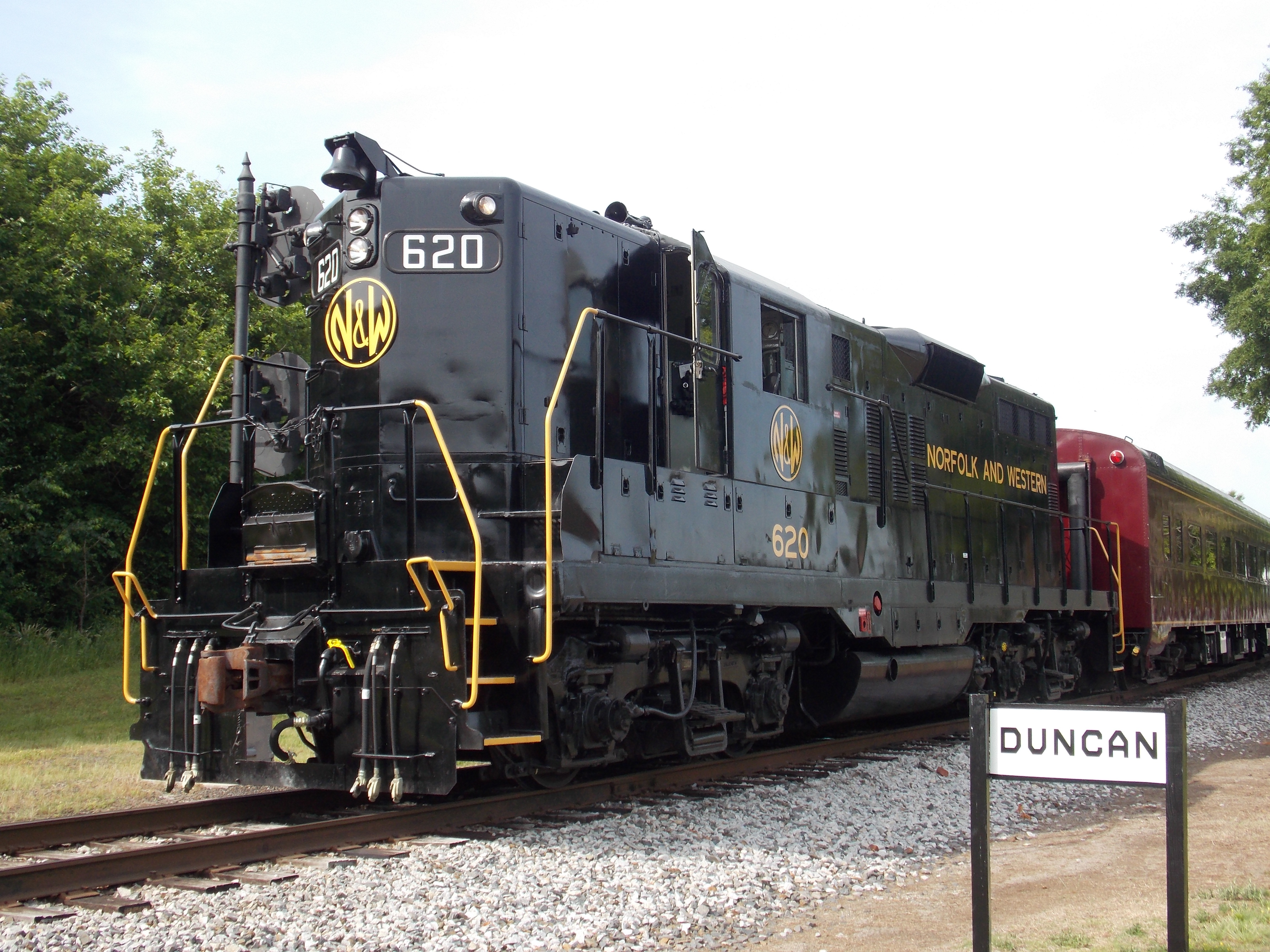
Norfolk and Western GP9 #620

The museum contains steam and diesel locomotives.

=== Steam ===
- Graham County Railroad Company Class C Shay #1925
- Atlantic Coast Line Railroad 4-6-0 #1031
- Southern 2-8-0 #542
- Seaboard Air Line Railroad 2-10-0 #544
- Carolina Power & Light Company 0-4-0F #3
- Duke Power Company 0-4-0ST #111
- W.R. Bonsal Company 0-6-0T #7

=== Diesel ===
- Southern E8A-Unit #6900
- Norfolk & Western GP9 #620
- Atlantic Coast Line E3A-Unit #501
- Southern GP30 #2601
- Southern FP7-Unit #6133
- US Navy 44 ton switcher # 65-00556
- Buck Steam Station GE 25 Ton switcher #5159
- USA/Beaufort & Morehead H12-44 #1860
- Norfolk Southern Railway (former) Baldwin AS 416 #1616
- Amtrak F40PHR #307
- NC Port Authority GE 45 ton switcher #L3
- Southern FTB #960604
- Aberdeen & Rockfish GP7 #205

=== Electric ===
- Piedmont & Northern GE 63 ton Boxcab-#5103

=== Notable exhibits ===
- "The Doris", a private rail car owned by James B. Duke of the American Tobacco Company and Southern Power Company. He named it after his daughter, Doris.
- "The Loretto", a private rail car originally built in 1902 for Charles Schwab and later owned by Spring Mills in Fort Mill, South Carolina. It features stained glass windows and ornate carvings finished in gold leaf. It was once owned by steel magnate Charles M. Schwab.
- "Southern Railway Car No. 1211", a car constructed for the Southern Railway by the Pullman Company in 1917 which was divided to comply with Jim Crow laws. The 1211 was later rebuilt by the Southern Railway at Hayne Shops in 1939, and more heavily in 1953 when it received a welded car body and long sealed windows. The 1211 is to be restored to its appearance in the 1940s and 1950s. The railcar was added to the NRHP in April of 2022.

=== Former exhibits ===
- Buffalo Creek and Gauley 2-8-0 #4

== See also ==
- List of heritage railroads in the United States

== Sources ==
- Galloway, Duane; Wrinn, Jim (May 15, 1998). Southern Railway's Spencer Shops: 1896-1996. TLC Pub. ISBN 978-1-883089-23-8.
