= Little River Railroad 110 =

Preserved 4-6-2 steam locomotive

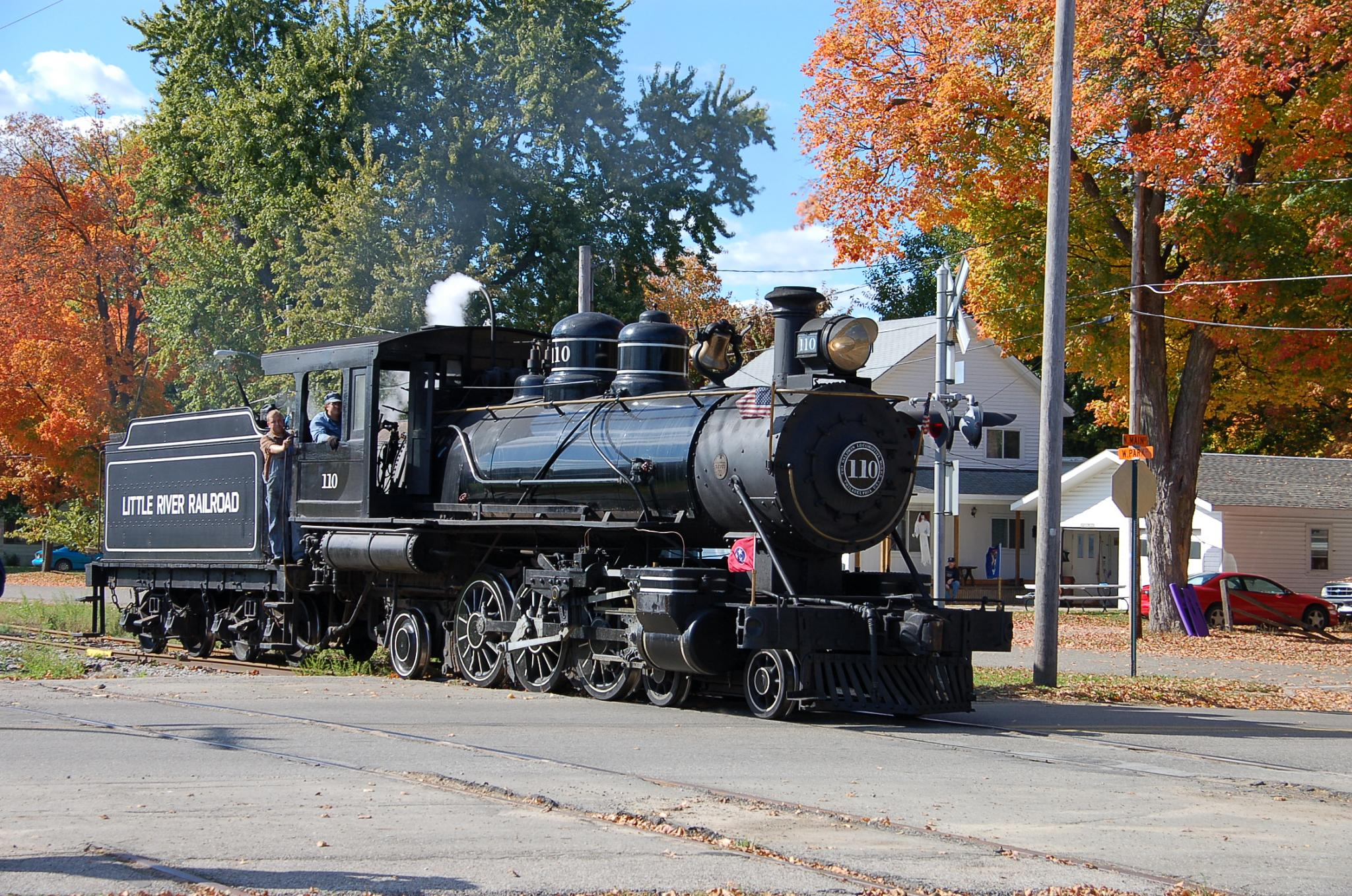
- No. 110 operating at the Little River Railroad, October 2008
Type and origin
- Power type: Steam
- Designer: Joseph Murphy Sr.
- Builder: Baldwin Locomotive Works
- Serial number: 37303
- Build date: November 1911
Specifications
- Configuration
  - Whyte: 4-6-2
- Gauge: 4 ft 8 1/2 in (1,435 mm) standard gauge
- Driver dia.: 47 in (1.194 m)
- Wheelbase: 8.33 ft 8 1/2 in (2.75 m)
- Adhesive weight: 72,000 lb (32.7 t)
- Loco weight: 109,000 lb (49.4 t)
- Total weight: 199,000 lb (90.3 t)
- Fuel type: Coal
- Fuel capacity: 6 t (5.9 long tons; 6.6 short tons)
- Water cap.: 3,500 US gal (13,000 L; 2,900 imp gal)
- Firebox
  - Grate area: 100 sq ft (9.3 m^{2})
- Boiler: 47 in (1.19 m) diameter
- Boiler pressure: 180 psi (1.24 MPa)
- Heating surface
  - Firebox: 100 sq ft (9.3 m^{2})
  - Tubes: 1,662 sq ft (154.4 m^{2})
  - Flues: 1,562 sq ft (145.1 m^{2})
  - Total surface: 1,662 sq ft (154.4 m^{2})
- Cylinders: Two, outside
- Cylinder size: 16 in × 22 in (406 mm × 559 mm)
- Valve gear: Walschaerts
- Valve type: Piston valves
- Loco brake: Air
- Train brakes: Air
- Couplers: Knuckle
Performance figures
- Tractive effort: 18,334 lbf (81.6 kN)
- Factor of adh.: 3.93
Career
- Operators: Little River Lumber Company; Smoky Mountain Railroad; Little River Railroad
- Number in class: 1st of 1
- Numbers: LRLC 110; SMRR 110; LRR 110
- Retired: December 9, 1954
- Restored: 1976
- Current owner: Terry Bloom
- Disposition: Operational

Little River Railroad 110 is a 4-6-2 "Pacific" type steam locomotive, built in 1911 by the Baldwin Locomotive Works (BLW). It is preserved and operated by the Little River Railroad (LRR) in Coldwater, Michigan.

== History ==
=== Revenue service ===
No. 110's builder's plate

No. 110 was designed by Joseph Murphy Sr. and was constructed in November 1911 by the Baldwin Locomotive Works (BLW) for the Little River Lumber Company (LRLC) in Townsend, Tennessee. The locomotive would spend twenty-eight years hauling both logging and passenger trains on the line until 1939, when the company ceased operations.

In 1940, the engine was sold to the Smoky Mountain Railroad (SMR) in Knoxville, Tennessee, where it would service hauling freight trains on the line for fourteen years until it was retired from revenue service on December 9, 1954. The railroad line ceased operations in January 1961 and the locomotive was sold to a tourist line in Massachusetts.

The locomotive would be moved to its new location by 44-tonner No. 440, however during the move, the locomotive kept causing so many problems for the railroad crew and it was decided to move the locomotive back to Knoxville. While the engine was being pushed back up the mountains, the engine derailed, about 10 miles away from Knoxville. This would eventually became too much work for the crews and the locomotive was pushed onto a siding underneath a highway and was left abandoned for several years untouched. In 1966, the tracks of the former SMR would eventually be pulled up and scrapped, while No. 110 would remain on the abandoned side track for six more years.

In 1968, Terry Bloom spotted the abandoned locomotive while traveling on a vacation with his family. He later contacted the Knoxville Chamber of Commerce and made an offer to purchase the engine for $3,100, which they accepted.

=== Excursion service ===
In May 1972, the engine was loaded onto a truck and moved to Southern's Jacksboro Team Track in Brookville, Ohio. The engine was placed on a side track for the next three years. In March 1975, No. 110 was eventually towed from the side track were restoration work officially began. It returned to service in 1976 and since then, it has hauled excursion trains at the Little River Railroad (LRR) in Coldwater, Michigan.

In July 2009, No. 110 traveled to Owosso, Michigan to participate in Train Festival 2009, along with seven other steam locomotives including Pere Marquette 1225, Nickel Plate Road 765, Southern Pacific 4449, Flagg Coal Company 75, Leviathan 63, Little River Railroad 1 and Viscose Company 6.

In 2018, No.110 was taken out of service to undergo its Federal Railroad Administration (FRA) 1,472-day inspection and overhaul; it returned to service in late 2020.

In September and October 2021, No. 110 would celebrate its 110th birthday where it operated a special, rare 45-mile excursion trip from Coldwater to Hillsdale, Michigan and return.

In July 2023, Nos. 110 and 1 ran a special 1.5-hour doubleheader excursion to Hamilton, Indiana and a 30-minute excursion to Steubenville, Indiana for the Indiana Railroad Open House event, along with Nickel Plate Road 765.

On April 24, 2024, the railroad celebrated its 50th anniversary and ran Nos. 110 and 1 on a special doubleheader excursion with a consist of all the railroad's passenger cars.

In July 2025, No. 110 celebrated the railroad's 20th anniversary of operations in Coldwater and ran a 11-mile round-trip between Coldwater and Quincy, Michigan. On November 22, No. 110 hauled the Cameron Christmas Train to Quincy, Michigan and return.

== Appearances in media ==
In 2018, No. 110 was featured in the western drama film Wild Faith, were the locomotive is seen pulling a circus train through scenes filmed at the Little River Railroad.
