= Little River Railroad (Michigan) =

Heritage railway in Michigan, US

Coordinates: 41.93509°N 85.00358°W

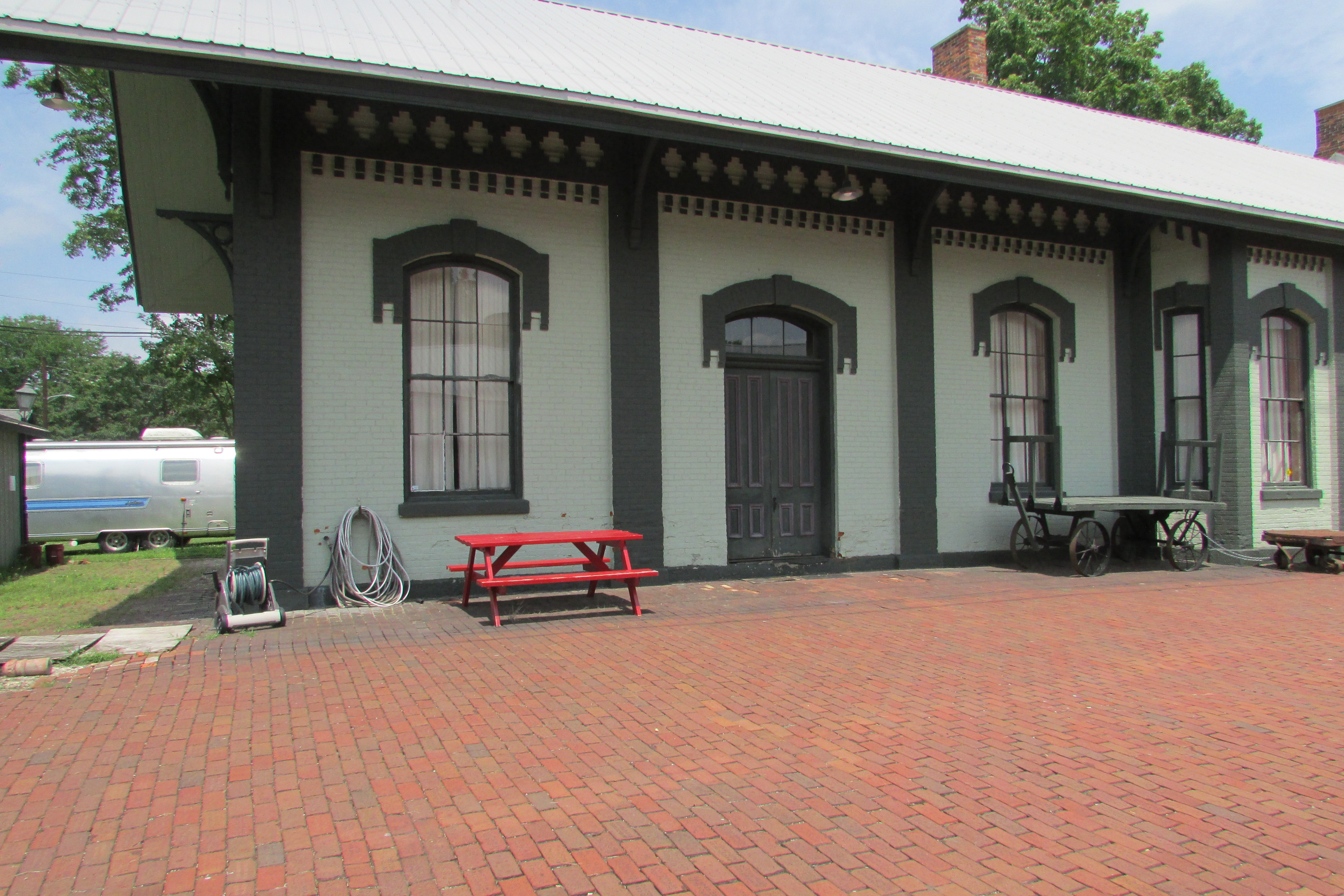
- The Lake Shore & Michigan Southern Depot, July 19, 2019

Overview
- Headquarters: Coldwater, Michigan
- Reporting mark: LRR
- Dates of operation: 1975–present

Technical
- Track gauge: 4 ft 8 1/2 in (1,435 mm) standard gauge
- Length: 27 mi (43 km)

Other
- Website: www.littleriverrailroad.com

The Little River Railroad (reporting mark LRR) is a heritage railroad located in Coldwater, Michigan. The train runs to Quincy, Michigan and occasionally Hillsdale, Michigan.

== History ==
The Little River Railroad was organized in 1975 and got its name from the original Little River Railroad and Lumber Company that used to be based out of Townsend, Tennessee.

Most excursions run between Coldwater and the village of Quincy, Michigan. Over the years, the track conditions between Coldwater and Quincy have drastically improved, leading to a smoother ride for passengers. Notable landmarks along the route are the I-69 overpass, two separate bridges crossing over the Sauk Creek, and a grade crossing with U.S. Highway 12. At their destination in the village of Quincy, passengers are able to step off and enjoy the park as the locomotive runs around the train and prepares for the return trip to Coldwater.

On March 11, 2023, the railroad opened a restaurant across from the depot called the Trainwreck Grill & Ale House, were riders can get off after an excursion ride and have lunch or dinner.

On April 24, 2024, the railroad celebrated its 50th anniversary and ran Nos. 110 and 1 on a special doubleheader excursion with a consist of all the railroad's passenger cars.

In July 2025, the railroad celebrated its 20th anniversary of operations in Coldwater and ran No. 110 on a 11-mile round-trip between Coldwater and Quincy, Michigan and return.

== Locomotives ==
Locomotive details
Number	Image	Type	Model	Built	Builder	Status
1		Steam	0-4-0T	c. 1908	Vulcan Iron Works	Operational
110		Steam	4-6-2	1911	Baldwin Locomotive Works	Operational

== Appearances in media ==
In 2018, the depot were filmed for the western drama film Wild Faith, were locomotive No. 110 is featured pulling a circus train through several different scenes.

== See also ==
- List of heritage railroads in the United States
- Non-profit organization
