= Graham County Railroad =

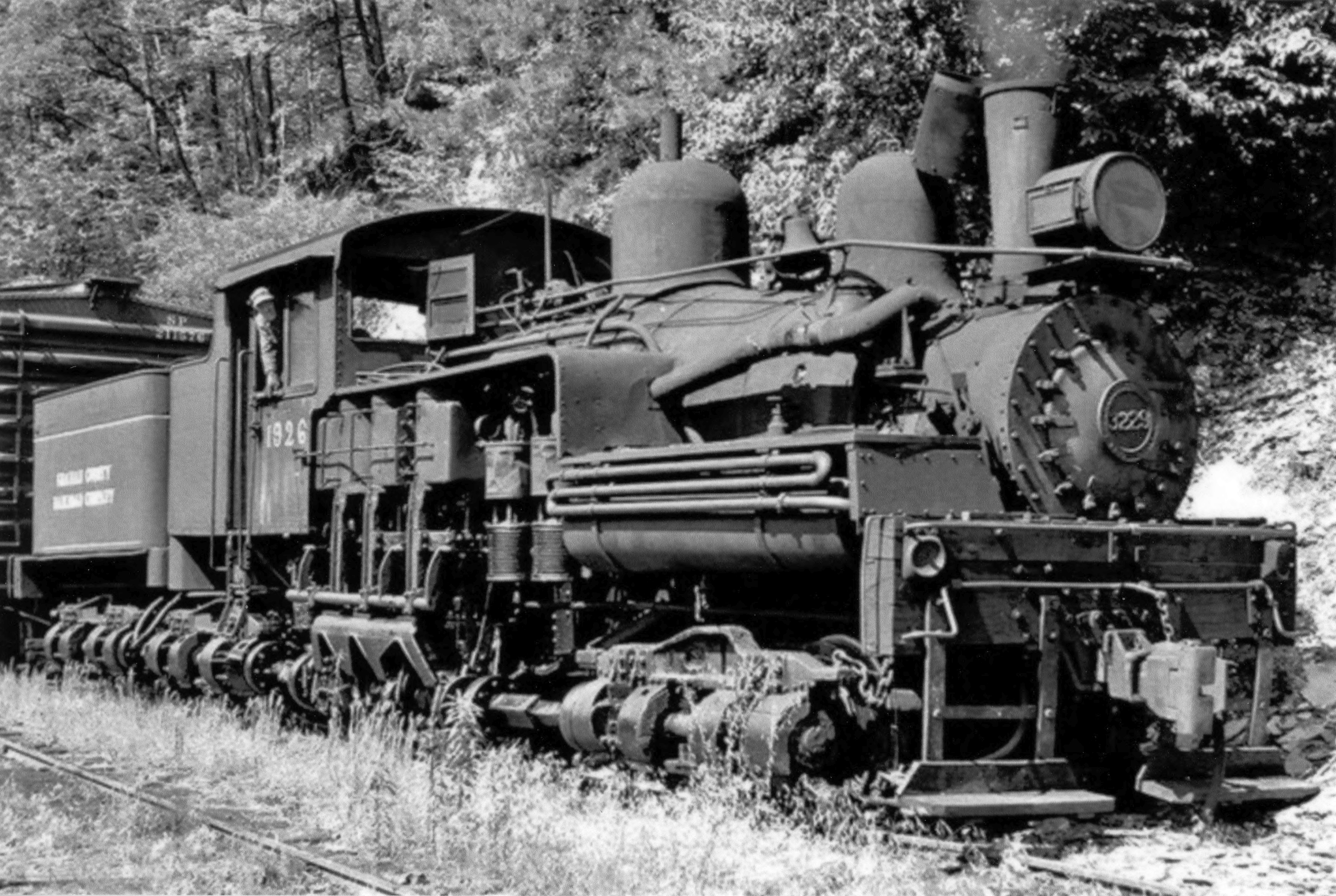
- Engine #3229 (1926)

Overview
- Reporting mark: GCRR
- Locale: North Carolina
- Dates of operation: 1925–1970

Technical
- Track gauge: 4 ft 8 1/2 in (1,435 mm) standard gauge

The Graham County Railroad was a logging railroad that began operations in 1925 and operated just over 15 miles of track.

== History ==
The Graham County Railroad was a logging railroad chartered in 1905 to connect Robbinsville, North Carolina, to the Southern Railway at Topton, North Carolina. Soon after the tracks were starting to be laid, the railroad purchased a used steam locomotive in need of repairs. The railroad sent the locomotive to Asheville, North Carolina, for repairs, but a flood hit the area and the locomotive was washed away and never found. The flood also washed away much of the existing track, halting all progress on the line. Then in 1925, the railroad finally became operational. Sometime in the 1960s, Shay #1926 lost its original number plate and it inherited the number plate from a scrapped narrow gauge Shay locomotive (serial number 3229). The railroad began doing excursions in 1966 with shay #1926 while #1925 handled the freight traffic. In 1967, the Bemis Lumber Company mill burned to the ground and when it was rebuilt, the mill began using trucks. The railroad continued on with local freight. By this point, the railroad's track was in poor condition which caused a derailment at least every 3 days.

In late 1968, Shay #1925 was on a mixed train lost its air brakes and turned onto her engineer's side at Nantahala Gorge, damaging her cab and water tank. Over the winter, the railroad then took the cab and water tank of #1926 to repair #1925 and the Bear Creek operations continued in 1969 with another Shay they bought, the #1923, a 2-Truck-Shay. This Shay formerly worked for the Conasauga River Lumber Company as their #112 until it was sold to the Bear Creek Scenic Railroad in 1966. On August 14, 1970, with freight traffic dwindling and the carpet mill closing, the railroad ceased all operations.

In 1973, the railroad reopened when Burlington Industries bought the line. #1925 took over the excursion runs of the Bear Creek Scenic Railroad. while a General Electric diesel handled most of the freight operations, but also ceased operations in March 1975 when a flood washed out a bridge. In May 1975, #1925 ran the last steam-powered revenue freight train. In 1982, the railroad re-opened operations with an EMD SW8 diesel locomotive that originally worked for the Atlantic Coast Line Railroad. The line finally shut down in 1983 and the tracks were taken up in 1987.

== Motive Power ==
The railroad operated two C class shay locomotives numbered 1925 and 1926, which they were numbered the same years they were built. The railroad also had one other steam locomotive numbered 1923. Steam locomotive # 2147 was used for display. The Railroad at one time also owned a 2-6-2 Prairie.

Shay Steam Locomotives
Number/Name	Wheel Arrangement	Builder	Serial number	Built	Retired	Notes
2 "Junaluska"	2-6-2 Prairie	Baldwin Locomotive Works	36045	February 1911	1924	Disposition unknown. Off the roster by 1925.
1923 "Old Cliffhanger"	2-Truck-Shay	Lima Locomotive Works	3241	October 17, 1923	1970	Built as Frost-Johnson Lumber Company #112. Sold to the Louisiana and Pine Bluff Railroad in 1926. Sold to Frost Lumber Industries in 1935. Then sold to the Conasauga River Lumber Company in 1950. The engine was sold to the Bear Creek Scenic Railroad in 1966 as their #1923 "Old Cliffhanger". Operated as #1926's replacement in 1969. It was then sold to the Oregon, Pacific and Eastern Railway in 1972. Sold to the Center for Transportation and Commerce in Galveston, Texas in 1978. Now at the Galveston Railroad Museum.
1925 "Old Sidewinder"	3-Truck-Shay	Lima Locomotive Works	3256	February 12, 1925	May 1975	Purchased new. Last ran in revenue service in May 1975. The Cass Scenic Railroad attempted to acquire 1925, however it was so heavily damaged that the acquisition was canceled. 1925 would later be donated to the North Carolina Transportation Museum in 1988; it was restored to operation in March of 1997. Taken out of service in 2005 and currently stored awaiting restoration.
1926	3-Truck-Shay	Lima Locomotive Works	3299	February 27, 1926	1968	Built as Tallassee Power Company #10 of Calderwood, Tennessee. Later sold to the Knoxville Power Company as their #10. Sold to the Graham County Railroad as their #1926 on September 16, 1940. Sometime around the 1960s, the engine lost its original number plate and ended up taking the number plate of a scrapped narrow gauge shay (serial number 3229). In 1966, it powered the Bear Creek Scenic Railroad excursion trains, painted up in a red livery and named "Ole Sidewander". In 1968, its cab and water tank was used to repair shay #1925. In 1988, the engine was sold to a railfan by the name of Michael J. Miller. It was then sold to the Cass Scenic Railroad in 2010 as a source of spare parts. It is currently awaiting restoration.
2147	3-Truck-Shay	Lima Locomotive Works	2147	April 14, 1909	1966	Built as Tellico River Lumber Company #2147 of Tellico Plains, Tennessee. The engine was later sold to the Babcock Lumber & Land Company. In 1927, Bond-Wold Lumber Company bought the shay. The unit was then sold to the Little River Lumber Company in 1932. Put up for sale in 1939 after the closure of the Little River Railroad. On July 31, 1940, the shay was sold to John J. Craig Company of Friendsville, Tennessee. In July 1960, the engine went to the Conasauga Lumber Company. In 1966, the locomotive was sold to the Graham County Railroad to be put on display at the Bear Creek Scenic Railroad as their #214. In 1982, the locomotive was sold to the Little River Railroad and Lumber Company Museum and was christened "Dorothy". It is currently on display at Townsend, Tennessee on the museum property.
102	70-tonner	General Electric	31725	April 1953	unknown	Built as Georgia State Authority #102. Later became Savannah State Docks #102 and who sold it to Birmingham Rail & Locomotive in July 1973, who later sold it to the Graham County Railroad. Sold to the Gifford-Hill Company in 1982 and rebuilt in 1984.
17	SW8	Electro-Motive Division	15956	March 1952	unknown	Built as Atlantic Coast Line #57, later Seaboard Coast Line #57 in 1967. Sold to the Graham County Railroad in May 1982. Later sold to the Carolina Eastman Railroad #17 and then Atlantic Steel Corporation #17. Later to Armco Steel Corporation #17 and then Warren Consolidated Industries as their #830.
