= Southern Railway 154 =

Type and origin
- Power type: Steam
- Builder: Schenectady Locomotive Works
- Serial number: 3114
- Build date: 1890
Specifications
- Configuration
  - Whyte: 2-8-0
- Gauge: 4 ft 8 1/2 in (1,435 mm)
- Driver dia.: 50 in (1.270 m)
- Fuel type: Coal
- Fuel capacity: 17,637 lb (8.0 tonnes)
- Water cap.: 5,000 US gal (19,000 L; 4,200 imp gal)
- Boiler pressure: 150 psi (1.03 MPa)
- Cylinders: Two, outside
- Cylinder size: 20 in × 24 in (508 mm × 610 mm)
- Valve gear: Stephenson
- Valve type: Slide valve
- Loco brake: Air
- Train brakes: Air
- Couplers: Knuckle
Performance figures
- Tractive effort: 24,500 lbf (109 kN)
Career
- Operators: East Tennessee, Virginia and Georgia Railway; Southern Railway; Smoky Mountain Railroad (leased); Gulf and Ohio Railways; Three Rivers Rambler
- Class: G
- Numbers: ETV&G 466; SOU 154
- Retired: August 1953
- Restored: July 3, 2010
- Current owner: Gulf and Ohio Railways
- Disposition: Undergoing 1,472-day inspection and overhaul

Southern Railway 154 is a G class 2-8-0 "Consolidation" type steam locomotive, built in 1890 by the Schenectady Locomotive Works, originally for the East Tennessee, Virginia and Georgia Railway (ETV&G), which merged to become the new Southern Railway (SOU) in 1894.

== History ==
No. 154 was built in 1890 by Schenectady Locomotive Works in Schenectady, New York. It was delivered to the East Tennessee, Virginia and Georgia Railway (ETV&G) that same year and was originally numbered as No. 466. In 1894, ETV&G was merged with the Richmond and Danville Railroad to form the Southern Railway (SOU) and No. 466 was renumbered to No. 154. During the locomotive's service life, No. 154 has worked on the Knoxville to Bristol and the Knoxville to Asheville divisions of the Southern, the engine was also leased to the Gloucester Lumber Company in Asheville in 1946 and has worked on the Murphy Branch. On at least one occasion (Autumn 1951), No. 154 was rented by the Smoky Mountain Railroad for temporary service as a road engine. In the engine's later years, No. 154 served as the "goat" (railroad slang for yard switcher) at City Yard in Knoxville until its retirement in August 1953 and given to the City of Knoxville to be put on display at Chilhowee Park.

When Knoxville's 1982 World's Fair was being planned, restoration of the locomotive for local excursions was seriously considered. However, Southern Railway inspectors deemed the task too daunting and, as a result, unworthy of the expense. In 1989, the locomotive was given to the Old Smoky Railway Museum which donated the locomotive to the Gulf and Ohio Railways in August 2008. The City of Knoxville and Old Smoky Chapter of the National Railway Historical Society made plans to restore 154 and it became the oldest operating Southern Railway steam locomotive. On July 3, 2010, No. 154 made its debut at the Three Rivers Rambler and pulled its first passenger train on the Gulf and Ohio Railways.

However, in August 2013, No. 154's bell had been stolen by a thief who had climbed over the fence and cradled to the Gulf & Ohio Railway yard where the locomotive was parked last night. On January 20, 2015, No. 154's bell was finally recovered when the Knox County Sheriff's Office deputies investigate a house on Kimberlin Heights Road, recovering everything from stolen cars to lawn equipment.

No. 154 made its last run on December 24, 2024 and was removed from service to undergo its Federal Railroad Administration (FRA) 1,472-day inspection and overhaul.
