= Three Rivers Rambler =

Train service in the United States

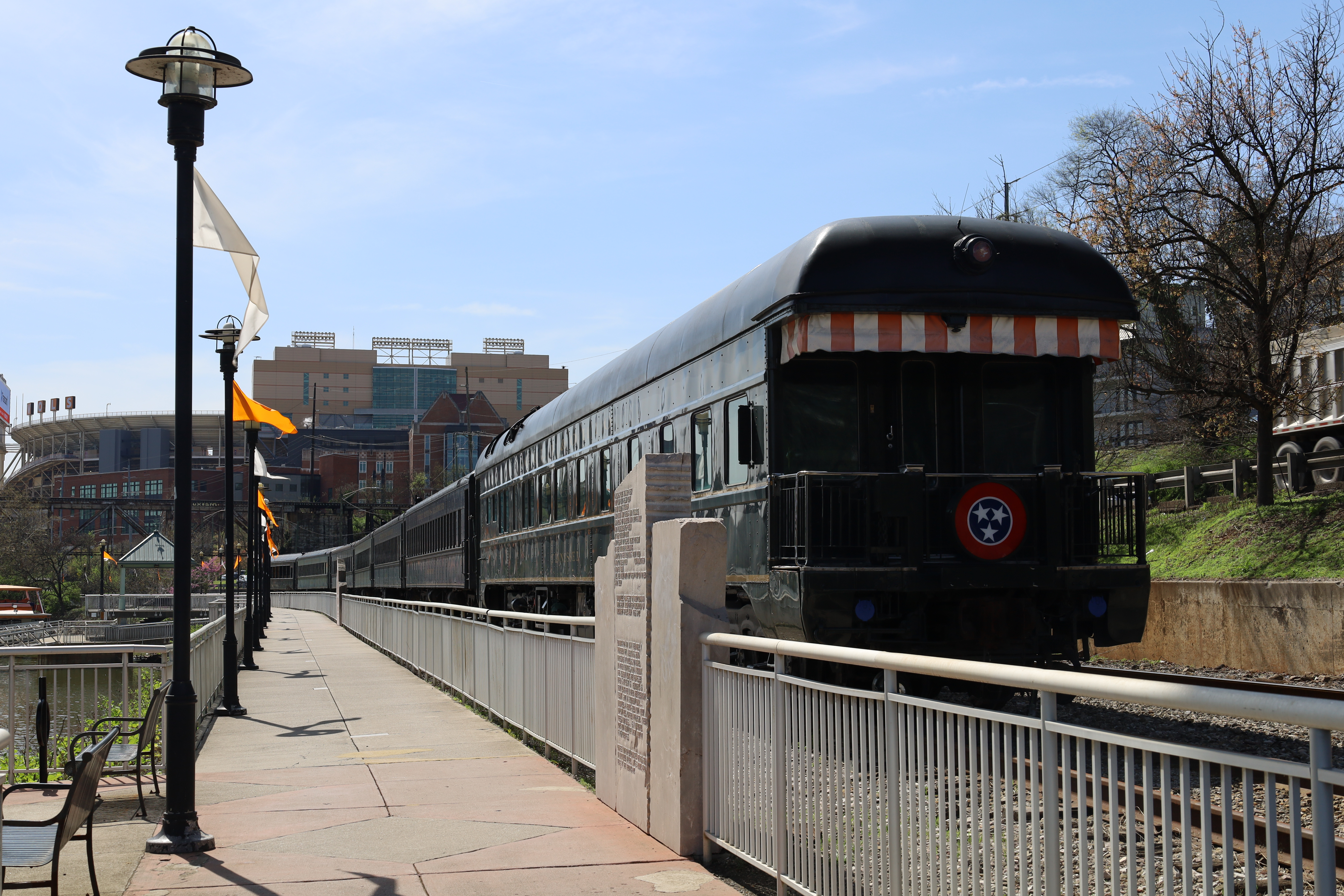
- The train parked by the Knoxville waterfront in 2025

Overview
- Service type: Tourist train
- Status: Operating
- Locale: Knoxville, Tennessee
- First service: 2000
- Current operator: KXHR

Route
- Termini: University Commons, Knoxville; Marbledale
- Average journey time: 90 minutes

Technical
- Rolling stock: 5
- Track gauge: 4 ft 8 1/2 in (1,435 mm)
- Operating speed: 10-13 MPH
- Track owner: Gulf and Ohio Railways

The Three Rivers Rambler is an excursion train in Knoxville, Tennessee along the Tennessee River. The train is operated by the Knoxville and Holston River Railroad, a subsidiary of Gulf and Ohio Railways.

== Course ==
The ride starts at a depot located at 2560 University Commons Way. The train heads out towards the river, going past the County Building, and under the Henley Street and Gay Street Bridges.

The train passes the Star of Knoxville riverboat and the locomotive's watertower and shed at the end of Volunteer Landing, where it parallels the Knox County Greenways down the river to the Governor Ned McWherter Riverside Landing Park. Beyond McWherter Park the train goes through the General Shale Brick Company and the Knoxville Utilities Board water treatment plant.

The train then follows the river for a ways past Knoxville Downtown Island Airport, before turning away from the river and going towards McNutt Farm. It then proceeds under the Riverside Drive overpass and past the Hines Compost Company. The train then reaches the Three Rivers Trestle (also known as the Forks of the River Bridge and built in 1913), where the French Broad River and the Holston River come together to form the Tennessee River. After the trestle is crossed, the Rambler heads back into town along the same tracks. The trip takes an average of 90 minutes.

== Equipment ==
Locomotive details
Number / Nickname	Image	Type	Model	Built	Builder	Status
203 (Lindy)		Steam	2-8-0	1925	Baldwin Locomotive Works	Operational
60		Steam	4-4-0	1923	Baldwin Locomotive Works	Stored, awaiting restoration
154		Steam	2-8-0	1890	Schenectady Locomotive Works	Undergoing 1,472-day inspection and overhaul
150 (John Henry)		Diesel	25-ton switcher	1943	General Electric	Display
2391		Diesel	GP9u	1953	Electro-Motive Diesel	Operational
