= Frost-Johnson Lumber Co. =

The Frost Lumber Companies, or rather, the Frost-Trigg Lumber Co. and, later, the Frost-Johnson Lumber Co., was founded by Enoch Wesley Frost, a resident and native of Arkansas.

Enoch W. Frost began lumbering with a small portable sawmill as early as 1881 in the region around Texarkana. He expanded his operations and became associated with a group who formed the Frost-Trigg Lumber Company in 1897. In 1907, Edwin Ambrose Frost, son of Enoch, in conjunction with Clarence D. Johnson, organized the Frost-Johnson Lumber Company which merged with Frost-Trigg. The company was developed by E. A. into a complex lumber operation and was for a time the largest lumber manufacturer in Northeast Texas and Northwest Louisiana. Clarence D. Johnson, who was born in New York, came south and began his sawmill career working as a trimmer in a Louisiana mill in 1885. Johnson worked his way up through the mill and eventually became the first vice-president of the Frost-Johnson Lumber Company.

In 1910 Frost-Johnson further expanded with the purchase of the Hayward mill and more than 50,000 acres (200 km²) of pinelands in Nacogdoches and adjoining counties, together with the Nacogdoches and Southeastern Railroad.

Frost Johnson was renamed Frost Lumber Industries Inc on July 1, 1925. They owned 450,000 acres. and three years later acquired another major Texas property with the purchase of the Waterman Lumber Company. With the death of E. A. Frost in 1950, the stockholders voted in 1952 to sell to Olin Industries who shortly thereafter sold to the International Paper Company.
