= Savannah and Atlanta 500 Class =

Class of steam locomotives

Type and origin
- Power type: Steam
- Builder: Baldwin Locomotive Works (BLW)
- Serial number: 52299-52301, 57329, 58683
- Model: 12-38 1/4 E
- Build date: September 1919, October 1923, September 1925
- Total produced: 5
Specifications
- Configuration
  - Whyte: 2-8-2
- Gauge: 4 ft 8 1/2 in (1,435 mm) standard gauge
- Adhesive weight: 160,000 lb (73,000,000 g; 73,000 kg)
- Loco weight: 210,000 lb (95,000,000 g; 95,000 kg)
- Tender weight: 160,000 lb (73,000,000 g; 73,000 kg)
- Total weight: 370,000 lb (170,000,000 g; 170,000 kg)
- Cylinders: Two, outside
- Valve gear: Walschaerts
Career
- Operators: Savannah and Atlanta Railway
- Numbers: 500-504
- Disposition: All scrapped

The Savannah and Atlanta 500 Class was a class of five 2-8-2 Mikado-type steam locomotives that were built by the Baldwin Locomotive Works (BLW) for the Savannah and Atlanta Railway (S&A).

== History ==
=== Construction and revenue service ===
In 1919, the Savannah and Atlanta Railway (S&A) ordered five 2-8-2 "Mikado" locomotives from the Baldwin Locomotive Works (BLW) and numbered them 500-504. Nos. 500-503 were constructed in September 1919, no. 503 in October 1923, and no. 504 being constructed in September 1925. No. 504 was delivered as a coal burner and a tender holding the same amount of water but 16 t (16,000,000 g; 16,000 kg; 35,000 lb) of coal.

The Savannah and Atlanta Railway continued to be independently owned until 1951, when it was bought by the Central of Georgia Railway (CofG).

After the S&A retired all five locomotives in the 1950s, Nos. 502, 503 and 504 were sold to the Elk River Coal and Lumber Railroad (ERC&L) being renumbered 15, 16 and 17. In 1963, All three locomotives were passed onto the Buffalo Creek and Gauley Railroad (BC&G) pulling occasional coal and lumber throughout the year. After seven years of service, No. 15 was scrapped in June 1962, No. 16 was scrapped in 1974, meanwhile No. 17 continued through its revenue service.

=== Excursion service ===
S&A #504 (as Buffalo Creek and Gauley 17) being scrapped on March 23, 1970.

In May 1965, No. 17 was sold to the Livonia, Avon and Lakeville Railroad (LAL) in New York where it served on excursion trains on the railroad. until No. 17 started developing mechanical issues, mainly problems with its firebox. After No. 17 was taken out of excursion service, the Livonia, Avon and Lakeville Railroad had purchased another locomotive, former Huntington and Broad Top Mountain 38, which had a former PRR class E7 tender. When Huntington and Broad Top Mountain 38 arrived on the LA&L, No. 17 was sold to a Rochester businessman who sold the locomotive for scrap on March 23, 1970.

== Fleet ==
No.	Build date	Serial no.	Operator(s)	Scrap date	Notes	Ref.
500	September 1919	52299	Savannah and Atlanta Railway	-		
501	September 1919	52300	Savannah and Atlanta Railway	-		
502	September 1919	52301	Savannah and Atlanta Railway; Elk River Coal and Lumber Company; Buffalo Creek and Gauley Railroad	June 1962		
503	October 1923	57329	Savannah and Atlanta Railway; Elk River Coal and Lumber Company; Buffalo Creek and Gauley Railroad	1974		
504	September 1925	58683	Savannah and Atlanta Railway; Elk River Coal and Lumber Company; Buffalo Creek and Gauley Railroad; Livonia, Avon and Lakeville Railroad	March 23, 1970	Scrapped as LA&L #17	
