= Knoxville and Holston River Railroad =

Railway line in the United States of America

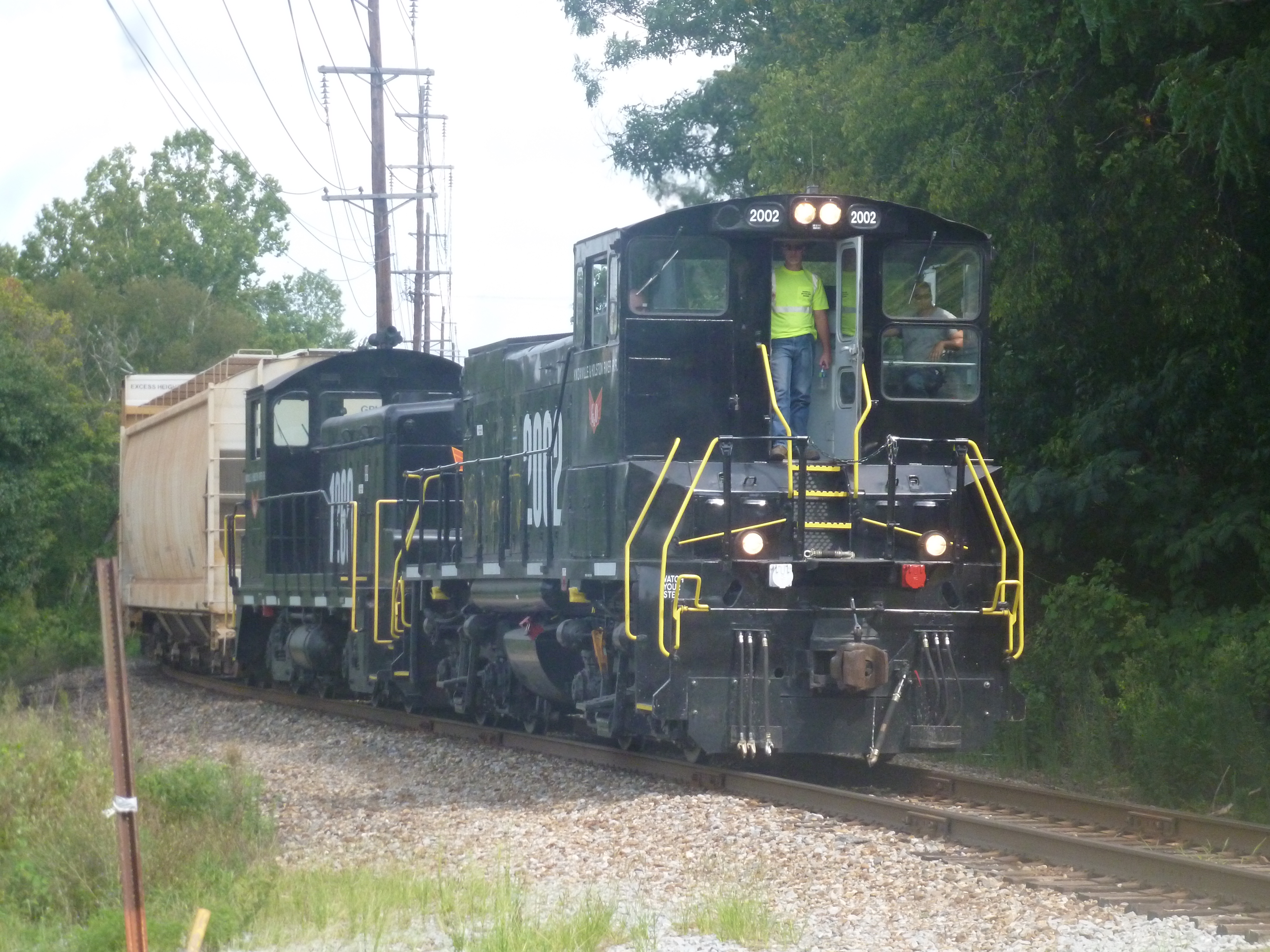
- Knoxville and Holston River Railroad MP15AC #2002 leads a train through Tyson Park near downtown Knoxville

Overview
- Headquarters: Knoxville, Tennessee
- Reporting mark: KXHR
- Locale: Knoxville, Tennessee
- Dates of operation: 1998–present
- Predecessor: Norfolk Southern Railway

Technical
- Track gauge: 4 ft 8 1/2 in (1,435 mm)
- Length: 18.98 miles (30.55 km)

The Knoxville and Holston River Railroad (reporting mark KXHR) operates over 18.98 miles (30.55 km) within Knoxville and Marbledale, Tennessee. This short line railroad was created in 1998 and is currently owned by Gulf and Ohio Railways. The railroad also hosts a tourist train run by Gulf & Ohio Railways, the Three Rivers Rambler.

KXRR currently serves 13 customers with the majority of them at the Forks of the River industrial park.

KXRR recently ended operations on its K-Line which extended almost four miles from a connection with Norfolk Southern to an asphalt plant on the Tennessee River which it served. The line is being donated by the railroad to the City of Knoxville to use as a trail. The K-Line included a tunnel.

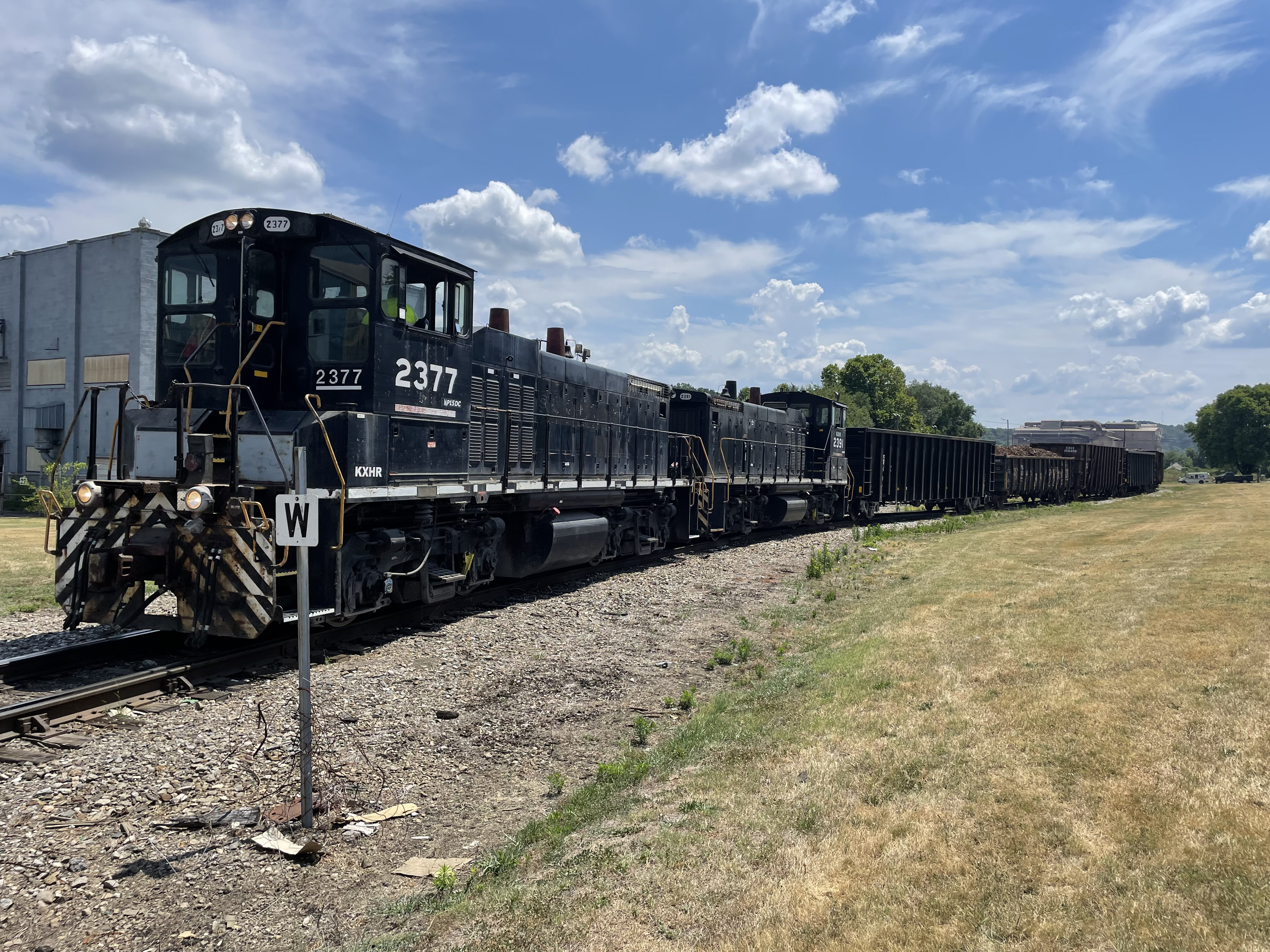
Dropping off loads of scrap metal for CMC Steel-Johnston Street-Knoxville TN

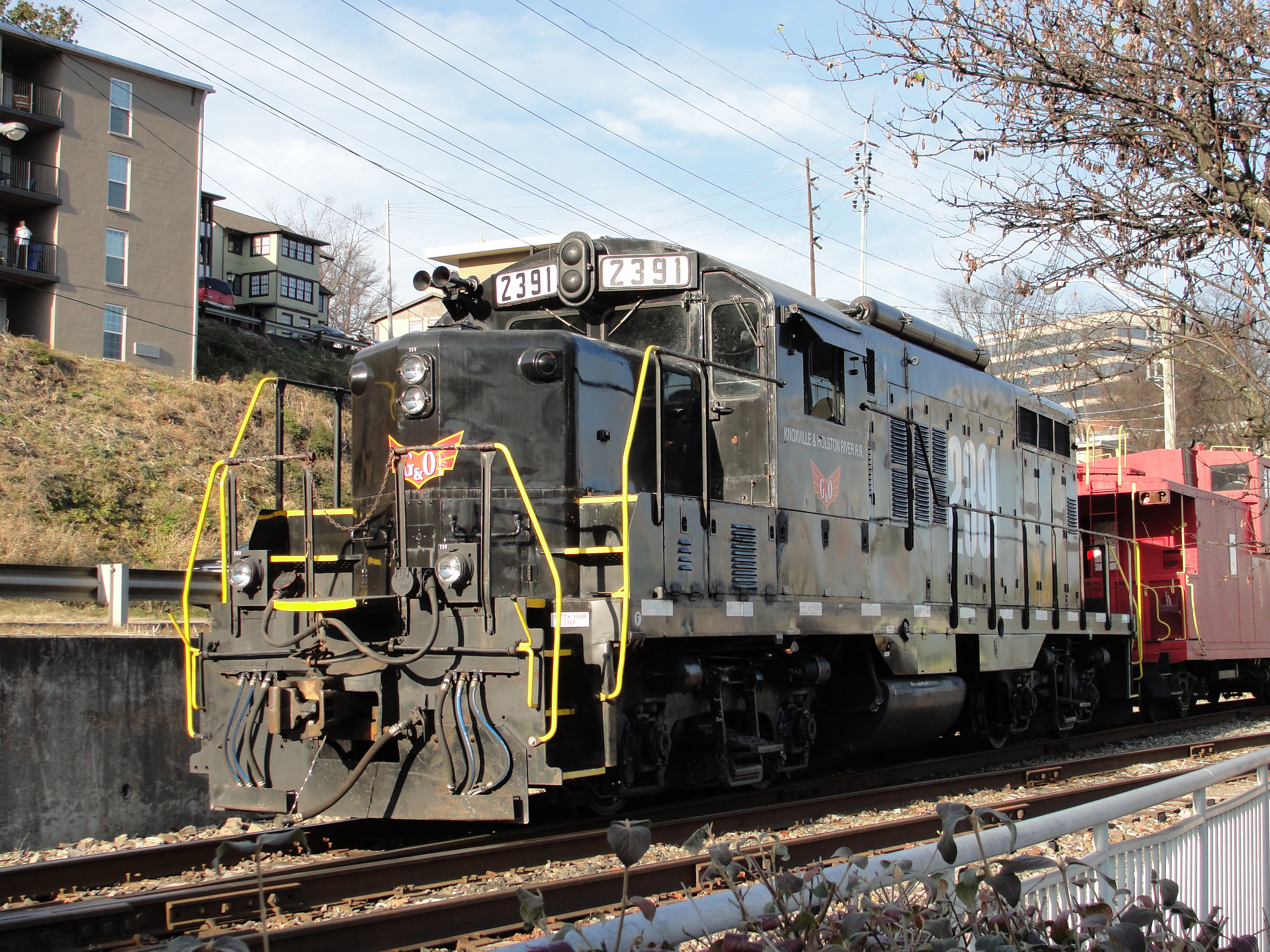
KXHR in Knoxville on the Three Rivers Rambler.
