= Avoca, West Virginia =

Unincorporated community in West Virginia, US

Coordinates: 38°27′11″N 81°03′02″W

Avoca is an unincorporated community in Clay County, in the U.S. state of West Virginia.

== History ==
A post office called Avoca was in operation from 1906 until 1909. Avoca was named after a place mentioned in Irish Melodies by Thomas Moore.
