= Durbin and Greenbrier Valley Railroad =

Railroad in the United States

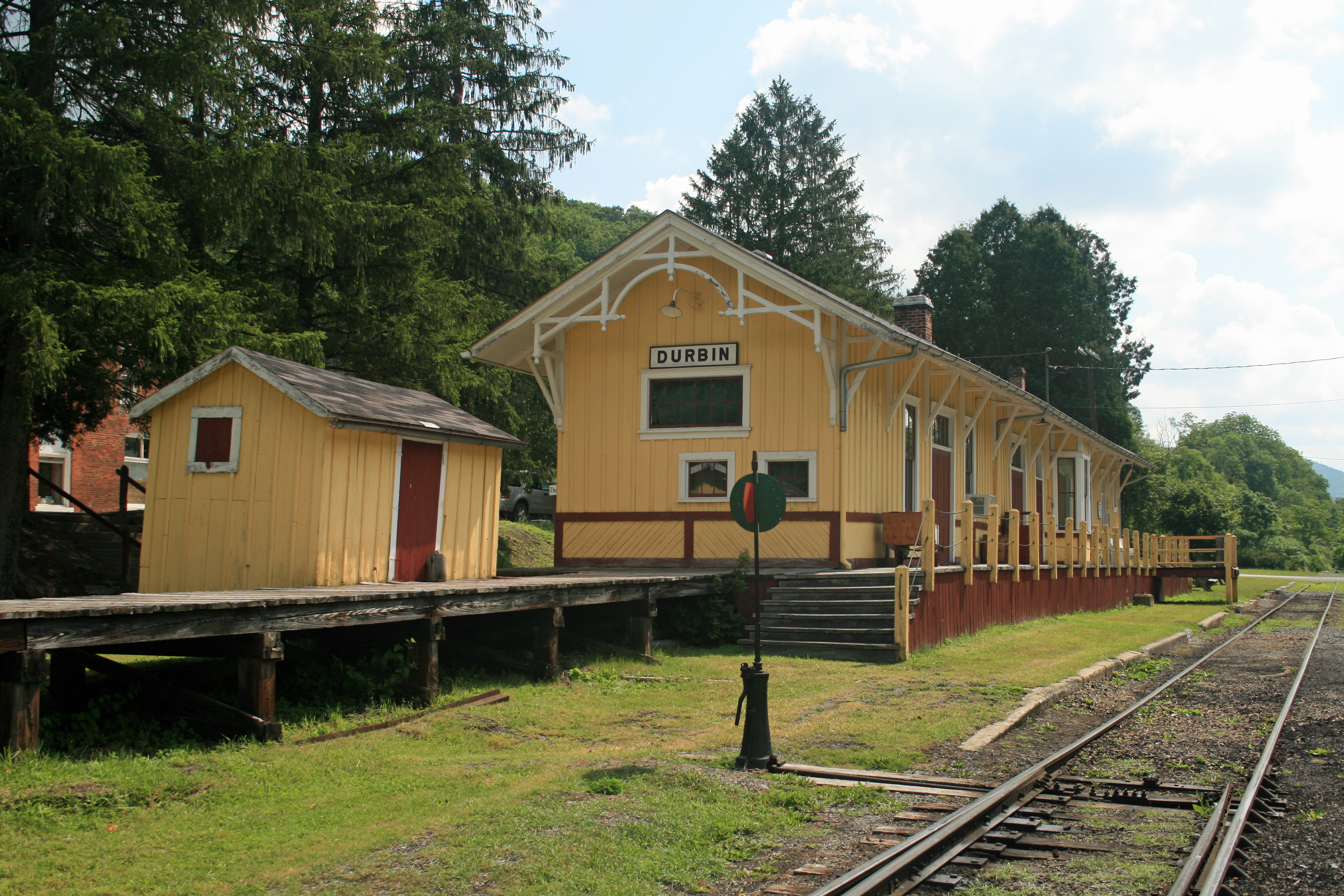
- The DGVR depot on July 19, 2009

Overview
- Headquarters: Elkins, West Virginia
- Reporting mark: DGVR
- Locale: West Virginia
- Dates of operation: 1997–present

Technical
- Track gauge: 4 ft 8 1/2 in (1,435 mm) standard gauge
- Length: 92 mi (148 km)

Other
- Website: mountainrailwv.com

The Durbin and Greenbrier Valley Railroad (reporting mark DGVR) is a heritage and freight railroad in the U.S. states of Virginia and West Virginia. It operates the West Virginia State Rail Authority-owned Durbin Railroad and West Virginia Central Railroad (reporting mark WVC), as well as the Shenandoah Valley Railroad in Virginia.

Beginning in 2015, the DGVR began operating the historic geared steam-powered Cass Scenic Railroad, which was previously operated by the West Virginia Division of Natural Resources as part of Cass Scenic Railroad State Park.

== Trains ==
The DGVR operates five different excursion trains in West Virginia:

- The New Tygart Flyer, which operates out of Elkins.
- The Durbin Rocket, powered by a Climax or Heisler geared logging locomotive, operates from Durbin. though this series has since been discontinued in favor of the “Greenbrier Express” series.
- The Cheat Mountain Salamander which operates out of Elkins.
- The Mountain Explorer Dinner Train which also leaves from Elkins.
- The Cass Scenic Railroad which operates from Cass. Five CSR trains are offered - one to Whittaker Station (Friday-Sunday); one to Bald Knob (Wednesday-Sunday), one to Durbin (Wednesday-Sunday), one to Spruce (special schedule), and one to Walnes (special schedule).

== Locomotives ==
Locomotive details
| Number | Image | Type | Class | Builder | Built | Status |
|---|---|---|---|---|---|---|
| 2 | | Shay | PC-13 | Lima Locomotive Works | 1928 | Operational |
| 3 | | Climax | B 55-2 | Climax Locomotive Works | 1910 | Stored, awaiting 1,472-day inspection and overhaul |
| 4 | | Shay | C 70-3 | Lima Locomotive Works | 1922 | Operational |
| 5 | | Shay | C 80-3 | Lima Locomotive Works | 1905 | Operational |
| 6 | | Shay | C 150-3 | Lima Locomotive Works | 1945 | Operational |
| 11 | | Shay | C-90-3 | Lima Locomotive Works | 1923 | Operational |
| 6 | | Heisler | C-90 | Heisler Locomotive Works | 1929 | Operational |
| 9 | | Climax | 70-3 | Climax Locomotive Works | 1919 | Operational |
| 4 | | Steam | 2-8-0 | Baldwin Locomotive Works | 1926 | Under restoration |
| 7094 | | Diesel | F7A | Electro-Motive Diesel | 1950 | Operational |
| 243 | | Diesel | F7A | Electro-Motive Diesel | 1952 | Operational |
