= Hartland, West Virginia =

- Unincorporated community
- Location within the state of West Virginia Hartland (the United States)
- Coordinates: 38°25′55″N 81°6′45″W
- Country: United States
- State: West Virginia
- County: Clay
- Elevation: 728 ft (222 m)
- Time zone: UTC-5 (Eastern (EST))
  - Summer (DST): UTC-4 (EDT)
- GNIS ID: 1554658

Hartland is an unincorporated community in Clay County, West Virginia, United States. Its post office is closed.

== History ==
The community derives its name from J. B. Hart, an early landholder.
