= Widen, West Virginia =

- Unincorporated community
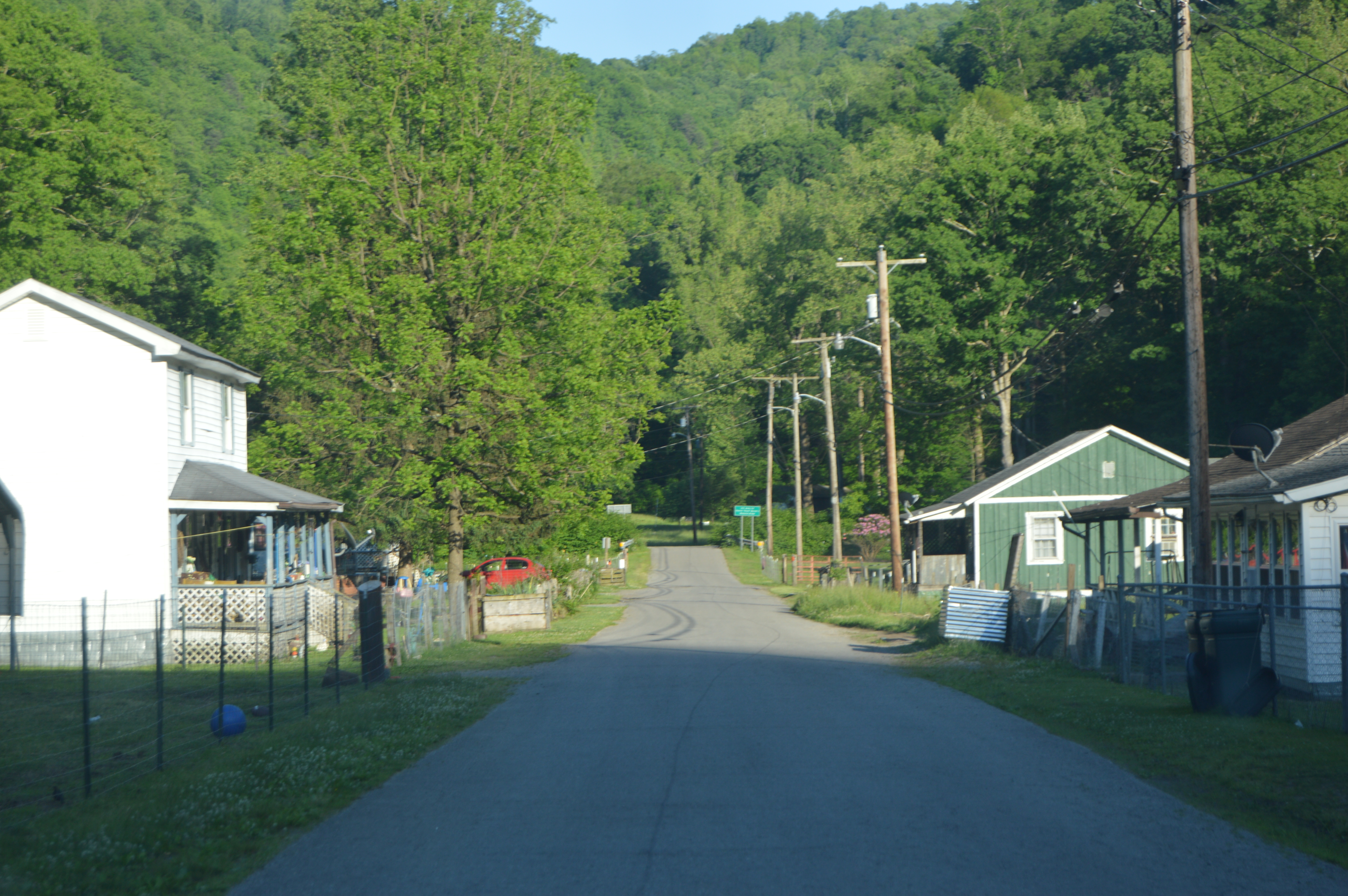
- Kanawha Street

- Location within the state of West Virginia Widen (the United States)
- Coordinates: 38°27′58″N 80°51′26″W
- Country: United States
- State: West Virginia
- County: Clay
- Elevation: 1,148 ft (350 m)
- Time zone: UTC-5 (Eastern (EST))
  - Summer (DST): UTC-4 (EDT)
- ZIP codes: 25211
- GNIS ID: 1549121

Widen is an unincorporated community and coal town in Clay County, West Virginia, United States.

The community was named after L. G. Widen, a railroad official.
