= Lindytown, West Virginia =

Lindytown
- Unincorporated community
- Location within the state of West Virginia Lindytown (the United States)
- Coordinates: 37°54′35″N 81°36′08″W
- Country: United States
- State: West Virginia
- County: Boone
- Time zone: UTC-5 (Eastern (EST))
  - Summer (DST): UTC-4 (EDT)

Lindytown is an unincorporated community in Boone County, West Virginia, United States. Lindytown was founded at the time Charles Lindbergh made his famous flight across the Atlantic and is based on a 50-acre (200,000 m^{2}) tract of land. Lindytown is approximately 22 miles (35 km) from Madison. Lindytown is accessible from Boone County Route 26, which is located off West Virginia Route 85 at the Van Bridge split.

The community has also been known as "Robin Hood" to locals, due to the former Armco Robin Hood Division Coal Operations mines, which were located in the area. Armco sold the Robinhood Division to Peabody Coal and eventually the mines were closed and the land was reclaimed.

Lindytown has received much media attention due to the town's proximity to a large mountain-top removal operation owned by Alpha Natural Resources (previously Massey Energy). Only five houses remain in the community, while the rest of the houses and even the church were destroyed by bulldozers.

Lindytown had one church: Twilight Church of Christ which is now destroyed.

Van Elementary School and Van Junior/Senior High School, located 9 miles (14 km) from Bandytown, are the closest public schools.
