= Price Hill, Boone County, West Virginia =

Price Hill, West Virginia
- Unincorporated community
- Location within West Virginia Location within the United States
- Coordinates: 38°02′36″N 81°48′25″W
- Country: United States
- State: West Virginia
- County: Boone
- Elevation: 751 ft (229 m)
- Time zone: UTC-5 (Eastern (EST))
  - Summer (DST): UTC-4 (EDT)
- Area codes: 304 & 681
- GNIS feature ID: 1545259

Price Hill is an unincorporated community in Boone County, West Virginia, United States. Price Hill is located on West Virginia Route 85, 1.5 miles (2.4 km) southeast of Madison.
