= Gordon, West Virginia =

Unincorporated community in West Virginia, United States

Gordon
- Unincorporated community
- Location within the state of West Virginia Gordon (the United States)
- Coordinates: 37°59′13″N 81°41′43″W
- Country: United States
- State: West Virginia
- County: Boone
- Time zone: UTC-5 (Eastern (EST))
  - Summer (DST): UTC-4 (EDT)
- ZIP code: 25093
- Area codes: 304 and 681
- GNIS feature ID: 1554583

Gordon is an unincorporated community and coal town in Boone County, West Virginia, United States. Gordon is approximately 12 miles from Madison. Gordon is accessible from Boone County Route 26, which is located right off West Virginia Route 85 at the Van Bridge split.

Gordon was named in 1883-1884 by Asa White, the postmaster, after a favorite nephew, Gordon Mason. It has also been known as Detroit for the Detroit Mining Company which had a mine there.
