= Hewett, West Virginia =

- Unincorporated community
- Location within West Virginia Location within the United States
- Coordinates: 37°57′44″N 81°51′07″W
- Country: United States
- State: West Virginia
- County: Boone
- Elevation: 817 ft (249 m)
- Time zone: UTC-5 (Eastern (EST))
  - Summer (DST): UTC-4 (EDT)
- ZIP code: 25108
- Area codes: 304 & 681
- GNIS feature ID: 1554691

Hewett is an unincorporated community in Boone County, West Virginia, United States. Hewett is 7 miles (11 km) south-southwest of Madison. Hewett has a post office with ZIP code 25108.

The community takes its name from nearby Hewett Creek.
