= Sharlow =

Sharlow may refer to:

== People ==
- Karen Sharlow
- Myrna Sharlow

== Other ==
- Sharlow, West Virginia, an unincorporated community and coal town in Boone County
