= Bald Knob, West Virginia =

- Unincorporated community
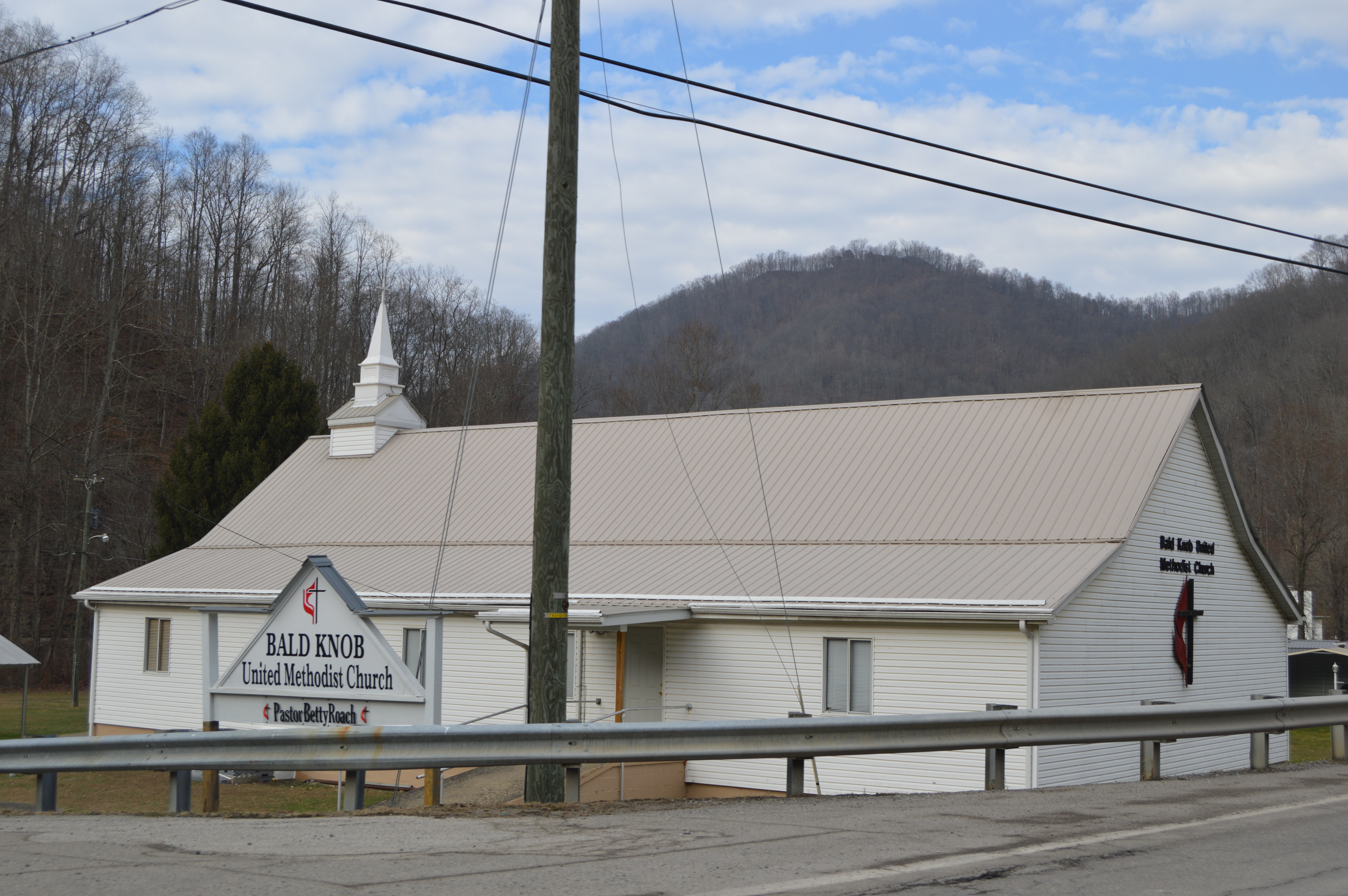
- Methodist church

- Location within West Virginia Location within the United States
- Coordinates: 37°52′15″N 81°38′08″W
- Country: United States
- State: West Virginia
- County: Boone
- Elevation: 1,093 ft (333 m)
- Time zone: UTC-5 (Eastern (EST))
  - Summer (DST): UTC-4 (EDT)
- ZIP code: 25010
- Area codes: 304 & 681
- GNIS feature ID: 1535163

Bald Knob is an unincorporated community in Boone County, West Virginia, United States. Bald Knob is located on West Virginia Route 85, 17 miles (27 km) southeast of Madison. Bald Knob had a post office, which closed on October 1, 2005. The community took its name from nearby Bald Knob.
