= Fosterville (disambiguation) =

Fosterville may refer to:

- Fosterville, a neighborhood in Youngstown, Ohio
- Fosterville, New Brunswick, a Canadian rural community in York County
- Fosterville, Tennessee, an unincorporated community in Rutherford County
- Fosterville, Texas, an unincorporated community in Anderson County
- Fosterville, Victoria, a rural locality in the City of Greater Bendigo, Victoria
- Fosterville, West Virginia, an unincorporated community in Boone County
