= Bim, West Virginia =

Unincorporated community in West Virginia, United States

- Unincorporated community
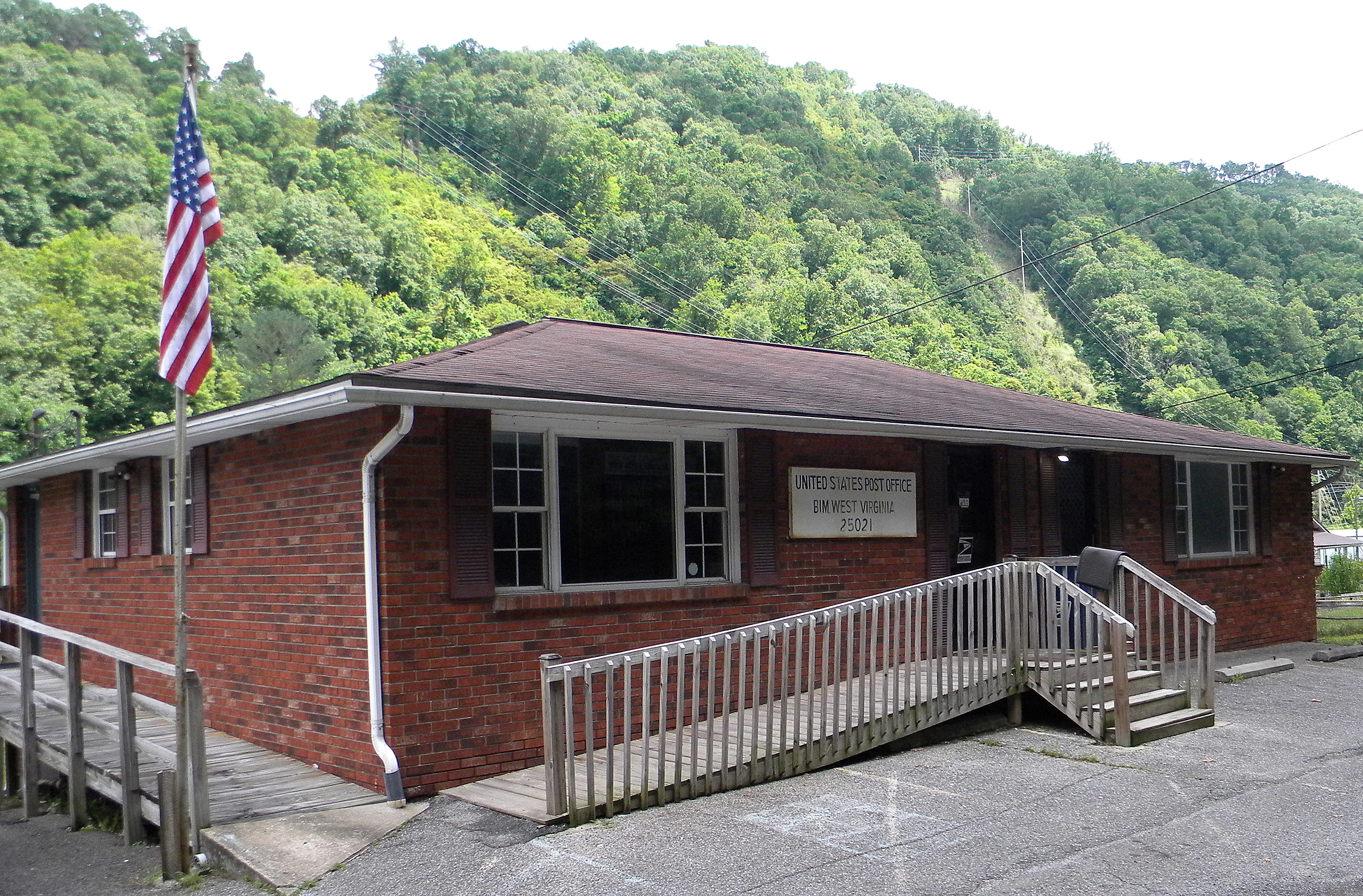
- Bim West Virginia Post Office

- Location within West Virginia Location within the United States
- Coordinates: 37°55′18″N 81°41′21″W
- Country: United States
- State: West Virginia
- County: Boone
- Elevation: 909 ft (277 m)
- Time zone: UTC-5 (Eastern (EST))
  - Summer (DST): UTC-4 (EDT)
- ZIP code: 25021
- Area codes: 304 & 681
- GNIS feature ID: 1560585

Bim is an unincorporated community and coal town in Boone County, West Virginia, United States. Bim is located on West Virginia Route 85, 12 miles (19 km) southeast of Madison. The Bim Post Office opened in 1923.

The community was named after Bim Gump, a cartoon character.
