= Janie =

Janie may refer to:

- Janie (given name)
- Janie (1944 film), an American romantic comedy
- Janie (2006 film), a short
- "Janie", a 2025 song by Ethel Cain from Willoughby Tucker, I'll Always Love You
- Janie, West Virginia, a community in the United States
