= Andrew, West Virginia =

Unincorporated community in West Virginia, United States

Andrew
- Unincorporated community
- Location within the state of West Virginia Andrew (the United States)
- Coordinates: 38°6′0″N 81°43′2″W
- Country: United States
- State: West Virginia
- County: Boone
- Elevation: 866 ft (264 m)
- Time zone: UTC-5 (Eastern (EST))
  - Summer (DST): UTC-4 (EDT)
- GNIS ID: 1534950

Andrew is an unincorporated community in Boone County, West Virginia, United States.

Laurel Branch and Drawdy Creek flow through Andrew.
