= Breece, West Virginia =

Unincorporated community in West Virginia, United States

Breece
- Unincorporated community
- Location within the state of West Virginia Breece (the United States)
- Coordinates: 38°8′13″N 81°53′46″W
- Country: United States
- State: West Virginia
- County: Boone
- Elevation: 761 ft (232 m)
- Time zone: UTC-5 (Eastern (EST))
  - Summer (DST): UTC-4 (EDT)
- GNIS ID: 1553970

Breece is an unincorporated community and coal town in Boone County, West Virginia, United States. Their post office, known as Laville has closed. It was also known as Laville, Mistletoe and Layville.
