= Ottawa, West Virginia =

- Unincorporated community
- Location within West Virginia Location within the United States
- Coordinates: 37°57′31″N 81°48′59″W
- Country: United States
- State: West Virginia
- County: Boone
- Elevation: 787 ft (240 m)
- Time zone: UTC-5 (Eastern (EST))
  - Summer (DST): UTC-4 (EDT)
- ZIP code: 25149
- Area codes: 304 & 681
- GNIS feature ID: 1555283

Ottawa is an unincorporated community and coal town in Boone County, West Virginia, United States. Ottawa is located on West Virginia Route 17, 7 miles (11 km) south of Madison. Ottawa has a post office with ZIP code 25149.

The community was named after the Ottawa Indians.
