= Wharton, West Virginia =

Wharton
- Unincorporated community
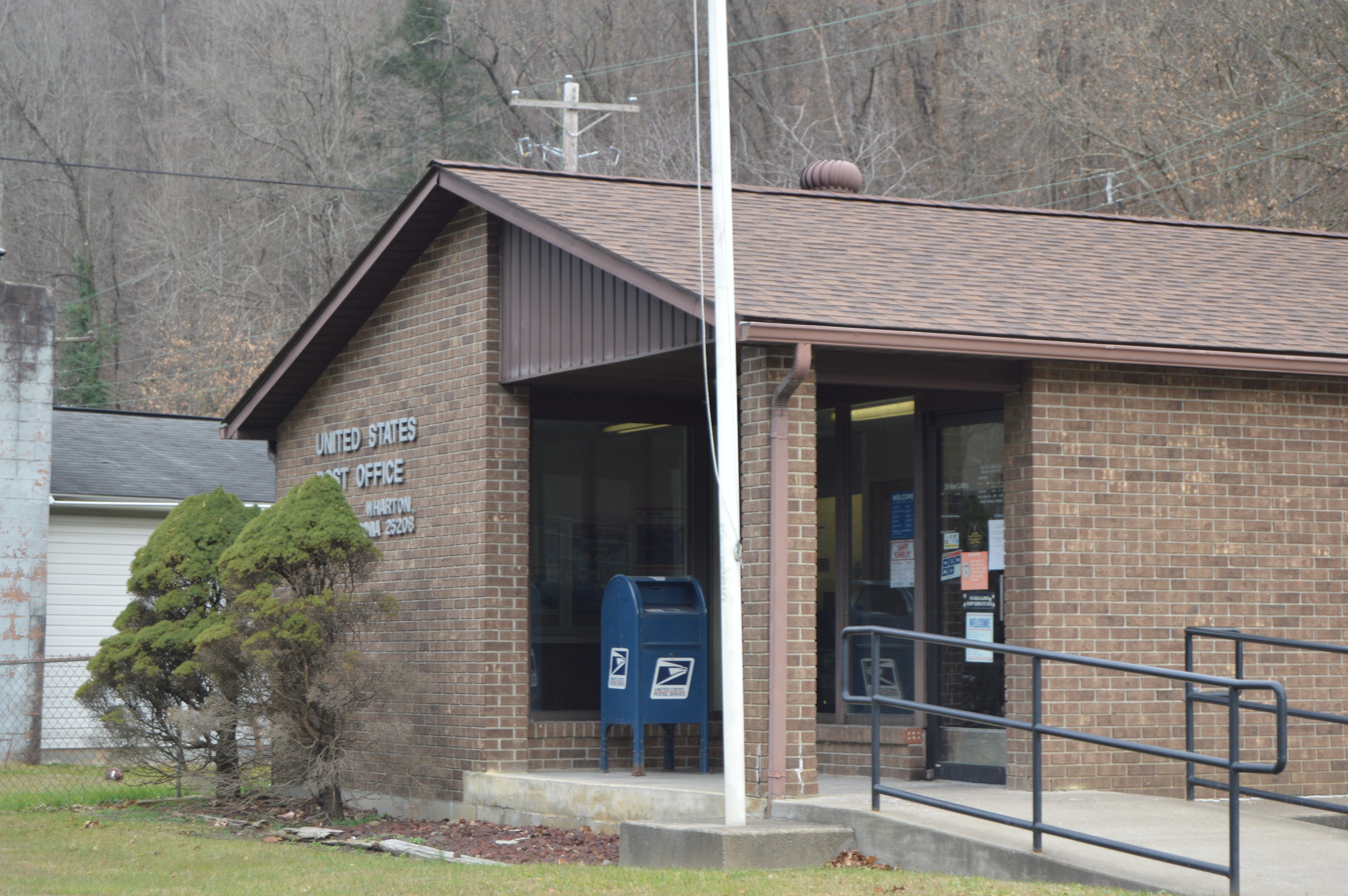
- Post office

- Location within the state of West Virginia Wharton (the United States)
- Coordinates: 37°54′12″N 81°40′38″W
- Country: United States
- State: West Virginia
- County: Boone
- Time zone: UTC-5 (Eastern (EST))
  - Summer (DST): UTC-4 (EDT)
- GNIS feature ID: 1548979

Wharton is an unincorporated community and coal town on the Pond Fork River in Boone County in the U.S. state of West Virginia. Wharton lies along West Virginia Route 85.

== Mining accident ==
On February 1, 2006, a miner was killed at Long Branch Energy's #18 mine in Wharton when a wall support popped loose. This fatality along with another one in a separate incident in Uneeda, also in Boone County, caused West Virginia Governor Joe Manchin to call for all West Virginian mines to "cease production until they could conduct safety checks".
