= Boone County, West Virginia =

County in West Virginia, United States

- County
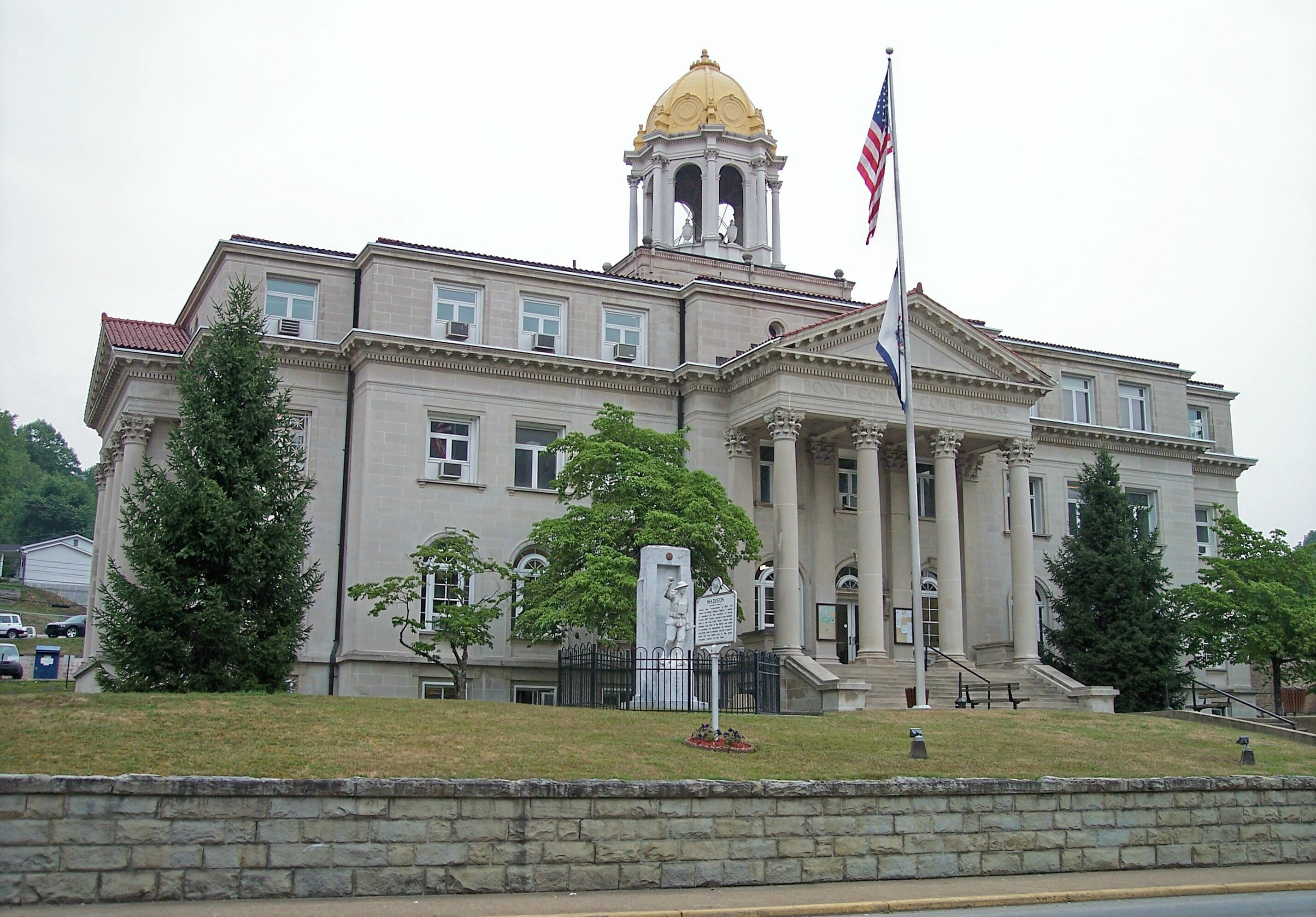
- Boone County Courthouse in Madison

- Seal

- Location within the U.S. state of West Virginia
- Coordinates: 38°01′N 81°43′W
- Country: United States
- State: West Virginia
- Founded: March 11, 1847
- Named for: Daniel Boone
- Seat: Madison
- Largest city: Madison

Area
  - Total: 503.19 sq mi (1,303.3 km^{2})
  - Land: 501.53 sq mi (1,299.0 km^{2})
  - Water: 1.66 sq mi (4.3 km^{2})

Population (2020)
  - Total: 21,809
  - Estimate (2025): 20,251 ▼
  - Density: 43.48/sq mi (16.79/km^{2})
- Time zone: UTC−5 (Eastern)
  - Summer (DST): UTC−4 (EDT)
- Congressional district: 1st
- Website: www.boonecountywv.org

Boone County is a county in the U.S. state of West Virginia. As of the 2020 census, the population was 21,809. Its county seat is Madison. Boone County is part of the Charleston, WV Metropolitan Statistical Area. Leading industries and chief agricultural products in Boone County include coal, lumber, natural gas, tobacco, and strawberries.

== History ==
The county was formed in 1847 with territories annexed from Kanawha, Cabell, and Logan counties. It was named for frontiersman Daniel Boone, who lived in the Great Kanawha Valley from 1789 until 1795.

In 1863, West Virginia's counties were divided into civil townships, with the intention of encouraging local government. This proved impractical in the heavily rural state, and in 1872 the townships were converted into magisterial districts. Boone County was divided into five districts: Crook, Peytona, Scott, Sherman, and Washington. Between 1980 and 1990, the county was redivided into three magisterial districts: District 1, District 2, and District 3.

On February 1, 2006, two fatal mining accidents occurred in the communities of Uneeda and Wharton in Boone County. These two deaths with the addition of January's Sago Mine disaster and the Aracoma Alma Mine disaster caused West Virginia Governor Joe Manchin to close all of West Virginia's mines in a "mine safety stand-down."

== Geography ==
Boone County lies in the central southwestern part of West Virginia. Its terrain consists of low wooded mountains, carved with drainages. The terrain slopes to the north and west, with its highest point at its south corner, at 3,212 ft (979 m) ASL. The county has a total area of 503 square miles (1,300 km^{2}), of which 502 square miles (1,300 km^{2}) is land and 1.7 square miles (4.4 km^{2}) (0.3%) is water.

== Major highways ==
- U.S. Highway 119
- West Virginia Route 3
- West Virginia Route 17
- West Virginia Route 85
- West Virginia Route 94
- West Virginia Route 99

== Adjacent counties ==
- Kanawha County - northeast
- Raleigh County - east
- Wyoming County - south
- Logan County - west
- Lincoln County - northwest

== Demographics ==
Historical population
Census	Pop.	Note	%±
1850	3,237		—
1860	4,840		49.5%
1870	4,553		−5.9%
1880	5,824		27.9%
1890	6,885		18.2%
1900	8,194		19.0%
1910	10,331		26.1%
1920	15,319		48.3%
1930	24,586		60.5%
1940	28,556		16.1%
1950	33,173		16.2%
1960	28,764		−13.3%
1970	25,118		−12.7%
1980	30,447		21.2%
1990	25,870		−15.0%
2000	25,535		−1.3%
2010	24,629		−3.5%
2020	21,809		−11.4%
2025 (est.)	20,251	▼	−7.1%
US Decennial Census; 1790–1960 1900–1990; 1990–2000 2010–2020

=== 2020 census ===
As of the 2020 census, the county had a population of 21,809. Of the residents, 20.8% were under the age of 18 and 21.1% were 65 years of age or older; the median age was 44.7 years. For every 100 females there were 100.2 males, and for every 100 females age 18 and over there were 98.0 males.

The racial makeup of the county was 95.3% White, 0.6% Black or African American, 0.2% American Indian and Alaska Native, 0.2% Asian, 0.2% from some other race, and 3.6% from two or more races. Hispanic or Latino residents of any race comprised 0.6% of the population.

There were 8,878 households in the county, of which 28.3% had children under the age of 18 living with them and 24.7% had a female householder with no spouse or partner present. About 27.2% of all households were made up of individuals and 13.1% had someone living alone who was 65 years of age or older.

There were 10,132 housing units, of which 12.4% were vacant. Among occupied housing units, 78.0% were owner-occupied and 22.0% were renter-occupied. The homeowner vacancy rate was 1.6% and the rental vacancy rate was 8.9%.

Boone County, West Virginia – Racial and ethnic composition Note: the US Census treats Hispanic/Latino as an ethnic category. This table excludes Latinos from the racial categories and assigns them to a separate category. Hispanics/Latinos may be of any race.
Race / Ethnicity (NH = Non-Hispanic)	Pop 2000	Pop 2010	Pop 2020	% 2000	% 2010	% 2020
White alone (NH)	25,064	24,220	20,712	98.15%	98.33%	94.96%
Black or African American alone (NH)	164	122	135	0.64%	0.49%	0.61%
Native American or Alaska Native alone (NH)	29	33	39	0.11%	0.13%	0.17%
Asian alone (NH)	18	21	36	0.07%	0.08%	0.16%
Pacific Islander alone (NH)	3	1	2	0.01%	0.00%	0.00%
Other race alone (NH)	7	5	18	0.02%	0.02%	0.08%
Mixed race or Multiracial (NH)	133	130	734	0.52%	0.52%	3.36%
Hispanic or Latino (any race)	117	97	133	0.45%	0.39%	0.60%
Total	25,535	24,629	21,809	100.00%	100.00%	100.00%

=== 2010 census ===
As of the census of 2010, there were 24,629 people, 9,928 households, and 7,014 families in the county. The population density was 49.1 people per square mile (19.0 people/km^{2}). There were 11,070 housing units at an average density of 22.1 units per square mile (8.5 units/km^{2}). The racial makeup of the county was 98.5% white, 0.5% black or African American, 0.1% Asian, 0.1% American Indian, 0.2% from other races, and 0.6% from two or more races. Those of Hispanic or Latino origin made up 0.4% of the population. In terms of ancestry, 15.4% were German, 13.3% were American, 12.9% were Irish, and 8.3% were English.

Of the 9,928 households, 32.2% had children under the age of 18 living with them, 54.0% were married couples living together, 11.3% had a female householder with no husband present, 29.4% were non-families, and 25.7% of all households were made up of individuals. The average household size was 2.47 and the average family size was 2.94. The median age was 40.7 years.

The median income for a household in the county was $39,783 and the median income for a family was $47,981. Males had a median income of $51,740 versus $32,110 for females. The per capita income for the county was $20,457. About 15.6% of families and 19.3% of the population were below the poverty line, including 25.9% of those under age 18 and 13.4% of those age 65 or over.

=== 2000 census ===
As of the census of 2000, there were 25,535 people, 10,291 households, and 7,460 families in the county. The population density was 50.9 people per square mile (19.7 people/km^{2}). There were 11,575 housing units at an average density of 23.1 units per square mile (8.9 units/km^{2}). The racial makeup of the county was 98.53% White, 0.65% Black or African American, 0.12% Native American, 0.07% Asian, 0.02% Pacific Islander, 0.07% from other races, and 0.54% from two or more races. 0.46% of the population were Hispanic or Latino of any race.

The largest ancestry groups in Boone County are English (13%), Irish (12%) and German (11%).

There were 10,291 households, out of which 31.10% had children under the age of 18 living with them, 57.50% were married couples living together, 10.50% had a female householder with no husband present, and 27.50% were non-families. 24.60% of all households were made up of individuals, and 11.00% had someone living alone who was 65 years of age or older. The average household size was 2.47 and the average family size was 2.92.

The county contained 23.20% under the age of 18, 9.00% from 18 to 24, 28.00% from 25 to 44, 26.30% from 45 to 64, and 13.60% who were 65 years of age or older. The median age was 39 years. For every 100 females, there were 95.50 males. For every 100 females age 18 and over, there were 92.50 males.

The median income for a household in the county was $25,669, and the median income for a family was $31,999. Males had a median income of $34,931 versus $19,607 for females. The per capita income for the county was $14,453. About 18.30% of families and 22.00% of the population were below the poverty line, including 27.90% of those under age 18 and 13.90% of those age 65 or over.

== Politics ==
With the exception of the 1972 Nixon landslide, Boone County voted Democratic in every presidential election from 1924 until 2012. In 2012, Republican Mitt Romney won over sixty percent of the vote in the process of becoming the first presidential candidate to sweep every county in the state. Also in 2012, in the state's Democratic primaries, Boone County was one of the West Virginia counties that voted for perennial candidate Keith Russell Judd, who at the time was still in prison on felony charges, over incumbent president Barack Obama.

United States presidential election results for Boone County, West Virginia
Year	Republican		Democratic		Third party(ies)	
Year	No.	%	No.	%	No.	%
1912	416	16.80%	1,119	45.19%	941	38.00%
1916	1,504	50.03%	1,397	46.47%	105	3.49%
1920	2,674	50.31%	2,529	47.58%	112	2.11%
1924	3,010	41.32%	3,326	45.66%	948	13.01%
1928	4,000	45.27%	4,805	54.39%	30	0.34%
1932	3,555	37.06%	5,973	62.26%	65	0.68%
1936	3,477	31.12%	7,697	68.88%	0	0.00%
1940	4,128	34.31%	7,904	65.69%	0	0.00%
1944	3,449	35.14%	6,366	64.86%	0	0.00%
1948	2,909	30.00%	6,769	69.81%	19	0.20%
1952	4,100	33.31%	8,209	66.69%	0	0.00%
1956	5,196	42.17%	7,126	57.83%	0	0.00%
1960	4,104	33.74%	8,058	66.26%	0	0.00%
1964	2,467	22.27%	8,609	77.73%	0	0.00%
1968	2,970	28.87%	6,391	62.13%	926	9.00%
1972	5,985	52.84%	5,342	47.16%	0	0.00%
1976	3,072	26.48%	8,528	73.52%	0	0.00%
1980	4,164	34.70%	7,515	62.63%	321	2.68%
1984	4,656	39.39%	7,121	60.24%	44	0.37%
1988	2,786	29.81%	6,539	69.97%	20	0.21%
1992	2,021	20.93%	6,576	68.09%	1,061	10.99%
1996	1,917	21.49%	6,048	67.79%	957	10.73%
2000	3,353	36.68%	5,656	61.88%	132	1.44%
2004	4,207	41.25%	5,933	58.18%	58	0.57%
2008	3,632	43.39%	4,529	54.11%	209	2.50%
2012	5,467	64.30%	2,790	32.82%	245	2.88%
2016	6,504	74.09%	1,790	20.39%	485	5.52%
2020	6,816	75.62%	2,041	22.65%	156	1.73%
2024	6,314	77.55%	1,641	20.15%	187	2.30%

== Education ==
=== Madison ===
- Brookview Elementary School
- Madison Elementary School
- Ramage Elementary School
- Madison Middle School
- Scott High School

=== Van ===
- Van Elementary School
- Van Junior/Senior High School

=== Seth ===
- Ashford-Rumble Elementary School
- Sherman Elementary School
- Whitesville Elementary School
- Sherman Junior High School
- Sherman Senior High School

== Communities ==
=== City ===
- Madison (county seat)

=== Towns ===
- Danville
- Sylvester
- Whitesville

=== Magisterial districts ===
- District 1
- District 2
- District 3

=== Census-designated places ===
- Comfort
- Greenview
- Racine
- Twilight
- Van

=== Unincorporated communities ===
- Adams is located on the east side of the Little Coal River below Julian and Horse Creek Junction.
- Altman appears to have been a settlement at or near the site of Horse Creek Junction on the Little Coal River.
- Andrew is located along Drawdy Creek above Peytona.
- Ashford is located along the Big Coal River at the mouth of Lick Creek.
- Bald Knob is located on the Pond Fork of the Little Coal River, between Clinton and Greenwood, at the mouth of the James Branch.
- Bandytown is located on the West Fork of the Pond Fork of the Little Coal River, between Marnie and Twilight, at the mouth of the Bandy Branch.
- Barrett is located along the Pond Fork of the Little Coal River, between Pondco and Clinton.
- Bigson is located on the north side of the Pond Fork of the Little Coal River, between Lanta and West Junction, at the mouth of the Lick Branch.
- Bim is located along the Pond Fork of the Little Coal River, between Marthatown and Wharton.
- Bloomingrose is located on the north side of the Big Coal River above Racine, at the mouth of Toneys Branch.
- Blue Pennant is located along Elk Run, about a mile and a half above Janie on the Big Coal River.
- Bob White is located between Van and Cazy on the Pond Fork of the Little Coal River.
- Bradley is located along Brush Creek, near Brushton.
- Breece is located along Big Horse Creek, at the mouth of the Dodson Branch.
- Brushton is located along the Big Coal River at the mouth of Brush Creek. Its post office retains the traditional name of "Costa".
- Cabot is located along the Hopkins Fork of Laurel Creek, between Prenter and Milltown.
- Cameo, also known as Garner Station, is located on the Jack Smith Branch of Big Horse Creek, about a mile and a half above Dodson Junction.
- Cazy is located on the north side of the Pond Fork of the Little Coal River, between Bob White and Kohlsaat.
- Clinton is located along the Pond Fork of the Little Coal River, between Barrett and Bald Knob.
- Clothier is located at the mouth of the Spruce Laurel Fork of the Spruce Fork of the Little Coal River, just below the Logan County line and Coal Valley.
- Coopertown is located on the east side of the Big Coal River, between Orgas and Fosterville, around the mouth of Haggie Branch.
- Dartmont is located on the east side of the Big Coal River below Ashford, at the mouth of Mikes Run.
- Dodson Junction is located on the Dodson Branch of Big Horse Creek, between Breece and Morrisvale, at the mouth of the Jack Smith Branch.
- Drawdy
- Easly is located along Brush Creek between Nellis and Bradley.
- Eden is located on the north side of the Big Coal River, above Sharlow and Bloomingrose.
- Elk Run Junction is located along the east side of the Big Coal River above the mouth of Seng Creek.
- Emmons is located along the Big Coal River at the mouth of the Cane Branch. The western part is in Boone County, and the eastern part is in Kanawha County.
- Foch is on the northeast side of the Pond Fork of the Little Coal River, between Price Hill and Uneeda.
- Foster is located on Rock Creek, at the mouth of the Hubbard Fork.
- Fosterville is located on the east side of the Big Coal River, between Kirbyton and Coopertown.
- Garrison is located on Seng Creek, about two miles east of its mouth on the Big Coal River.
- Gordon is located on Whites Branch, a tributary of the Pond Fork of the Little Coal River.
- Greenview is located along the Spruce Fork of the Little Coal River, between Ramage and Powell Creek, at the mouth of Big Branch.
- Greenwood is located along the Pond Fork of the Little Coal River, between Bald Knob and Rocklick.
- Grippe is located on the north side of the Big Coal River along the Boone County–Kanawha County line.
- Havana is located along Sixmile Creek. A postmaster was appointed there in 1913.
- Hewett is located along Hewett Creek, about a mile and a half above Jeffrey.
- High Coal is located above Garrison on Seng Creek.
- Hopkins Fork is located along Laurel Creek, about three miles above Seth.
- Horse Creek Junction is located below Julian on the west side of the Little Coal River, at the mouth of Big Horse Creek.
- Janie is located on the southwest side of the Big Coal River, between Elk Run Junction and Whitesville, at the mouth of Elk Run.
- Jeffrey is located on the Spruce Fork of the Little Coal River, between Ottawa and Secoal, at the mouth of Hewett Creek.
- Joes Creek is a hamlet located along Joes Creek, several miles above Comfort.
- Johns is located on the south side of the Big Coal River between Peytona and Brushton.
- Julian is located on the east side of the Little Coal River, opposite the mouths of Big Horse Creek and Little Horse Creek.
- Keith is located along the Big Coal River between Sylvester and Orgas.
- Kirbyton is located along the Big Coal River, between Seth and Fosterville.
- Kohlsaat is located on the south side of the Pond Fork of the Little Coal River, between Cazy and Marthatown.
- Lanta is located between Quinland and Bigson on the Pond Fork of the Little Coal River.
- Layville is located on the Dodson Branch of Big Horse Creek, about a mile above Morrisvale.
- Lick Creek is located along Lick Creek, about a mile and a half above the mouth.
- Lindytown is located above Twilight on the West Fork of the Pond Fork of the Little Coal River.
- Low Gap is located along the Spruce Fork of the Little Coal River, on the east side just above Washington Heights, and below the mouth of Low Gap Creek.
- Manila is located on the Trace Fork of Big Creek.
- Marnie is located below Bandytown along the West Fork of the Pond Fork of the Little Coal River.
- Marthatown is located on the south side of the Pond Fork of the Little Coal River, between Kohlsaat and Bim.
- Maxine is located on the south side of the Big Coal River between Sharlow and Comfort.
- Milltown is located along the Hopkins Fork of Laurel Creek, just below Cabot, at the mouth of the Lavinia Fork.
- Morrisvale is located on the Dodson Branch of Big Horse Creek, above Dodson Junction and Breece, at the mouth of the Sugarcamp Branch.
- Nellis is located along Brush Creek between Ridgeview and Easly.
- Nelson is located along the Hopkins Fork of Laurel Creek, between Hopkins Fork and Milltown.
- Orgas is located along the Big Coal River, between Keith and Coopertown.
- Ottawa is located on the Spruce Fork of the Little Coal River between Jeffrey and Clothier, at the mouth of the Stollings Branch.
- Peytona is a village on the Big Coal River along the mouths of Drawdy and Roundbottom Creeks.
- Pondco is located along the Pond Fork of the Little Coal River, between Wharton and Barrett.
- Powell Creek is located along the Spruce Fork of the Little Coal River, between Greenview and Low Gap, on the east side, opposite the mouth of Powell Creek.
- Prenter is located along Big Jarrells Creek, about three miles above Milltown.
- Price Hill is located on the east side of the Pond Fork of the Little Coal River, just above South Madison.
- Quinland is located above Uneeda on the Pond Fork of the Little Coal River, at the mouth of the Mack Gore Branch.
- Ramage is located on the Spruce Fork of the Little Coal River, between Secoal and Greenview, at the mouth of Sixmile Creek.
- Ridgeview is located along Brush Creek above Nellis.
- Rock Creek is located on the Little Coal River below Danville, at the mouth of Rock Creek.
- Rocklick is located above Bald Knob and Greenwood on the Pond Fork of the Little Coal River, at the mouth of the Rocklick Branch.
- Rumble is a village on Lick Creek above Ashford.
- Secoal is located on the west side of the Spruce Fork of the Little Coal River, between Jeffrey and Ramage, at the mouth of the Bias Branch.
- Seth is located along the Big Coal River, above Comfort.
- Sharlow is located on the south side of the Big Coal River, just below Eden.
- South Madison is located on the west side of the Pond Fork of the Little Coal River, about a mile above Madison, and just below Price Hill.
- Stark is located on the Spruce Laurel Fork of the Spruce Fork of the Little Coal River, several miles above Clothier.
- Turtle Creek is located along Turtle Creek, above the mouth of the Indian Grave Branch.
- Uneeda is located on the Pond Fork of the Little Coal River, between Price Hill and Quinland, at the mouth of the Jarrell Branch.
- Washington Heights is on the west side of the Spruce Fork of the Little Coal River, about two miles above Madison, at the mouth of the Laurel Branch, and just below Low Gap.
- West Junction is located along the Pond Fork of the Little Coal River, just below Van.
- Wharton is located along the Pond Fork of the Little Coal River, between Bim and Pondco.
- Williams Mountain is located on a ridge in central Boone County.

== Surnames ==
Most common surnames in Boone County as of 2014:

Rank	Surname	Persons	Origin(s)
1	Miller	405	English / German / Irish / Scottish
2	Jarrell	354	English
3	Smith	348	English
4	Adkins	329	English
5	Hager	295	German
6	Ball	292	English
7	White	275	English / Irish / Scottish
8	Price	270	Welsh
9	Cook	240	English
10	Barker	226	English

== Notable people ==
- Hasil Adkins, musician
- Billy Edd Wheeler, songwriter
- D. Ray White, mountain dancer, father of Jesco White
- Jesco White, "the Dancing Outlaw", mountain dancer, son of D. Ray White.

== See also ==
- Hobet Coal Mine
- Fork Creek Wildlife Management Area
- The Wild and Wonderful Whites of West Virginia, a documentary film set in Boone County
- National Register of Historic Places listings in Boone County, West Virginia
- Upper Big Branch Miners Memorial, a roadside memorial in Whitesville to honor the 29 men killed in an explosion at the Upper Big Branch Coal Mine on April 5, 2010.
