= Elk Run =

Elk Run and Elkrun may refer to:

- Elk Run (West Branch Fishing Creek), a stream in Pennsylvania
- Elk Run, Virginia, an unincorporated community in Fauquier County
- Elkrun Township, Ohio

== See also ==
- Elk Run Heights, Iowa, a city in Black Hawk County
- Elk Run Junction, West Virginia, an unincorporated community in Boone County
- Elk's Run, a comic book
