= Ridgeview, West Virginia =

Ridgeview, West Virginia may refer to:

- Ridgeview, Boone County, West Virginia, an unincorporated community in Boone County
- Ridgeview, Logan County, West Virginia, an unincorporated community in Logan County
