= Kohlsaat =

Kohlsaat may refer to:

== People ==
- Christian Cecil Kohlsaat
- H. H. Kohlsaat

== Other ==
- Kohlsaat, West Virginia, an unincorporated community in Boone County
- Cape Kohlsaat, a point on the easternmost island of Franz Josef Land, Russia
