= Williams Mountain, West Virginia =

- Unincorporated community
- Location within West Virginia Location within the United States
- Coordinates: 38°01′33″N 81°40′09″W
- Country: United States
- State: West Virginia
- County: Boone
- Elevation: 1,713 ft (522 m)
- Time zone: UTC-5 (Eastern (EST))
  - Summer (DST): UTC-4 (EDT)
- Area codes: 304 & 681
- GNIS feature ID: 1555990

Williams Mountain is an unincorporated community in Boone County, West Virginia, United States. Williams Mountain is 8.5 miles (13.7 km) east-southeast of Madison.
