= Foster, West Virginia =

Unincorporated community in West Virginia, United States

- Unincorporated community
- Location within West Virginia Location within the United States
- Coordinates: 38°05′50″N 81°46′47″W
- Country: United States
- State: West Virginia
- County: Boone
- Elevation: 879 ft (268 m)
- Time zone: UTC-5 (Eastern (EST))
  - Summer (DST): UTC-4 (EDT)
- ZIP code: 25081
- Area codes: 304 & 681
- GNIS feature ID: 1554499

Foster is an unincorporated community in Boone County, West Virginia, United States. Foster is located on West Virginia Route 3, 3 miles (4.8 km) northeast of Madison. Foster has a post office with ZIP code 25081.
