= Quinland, West Virginia =

Quinland
- Unincorporated community
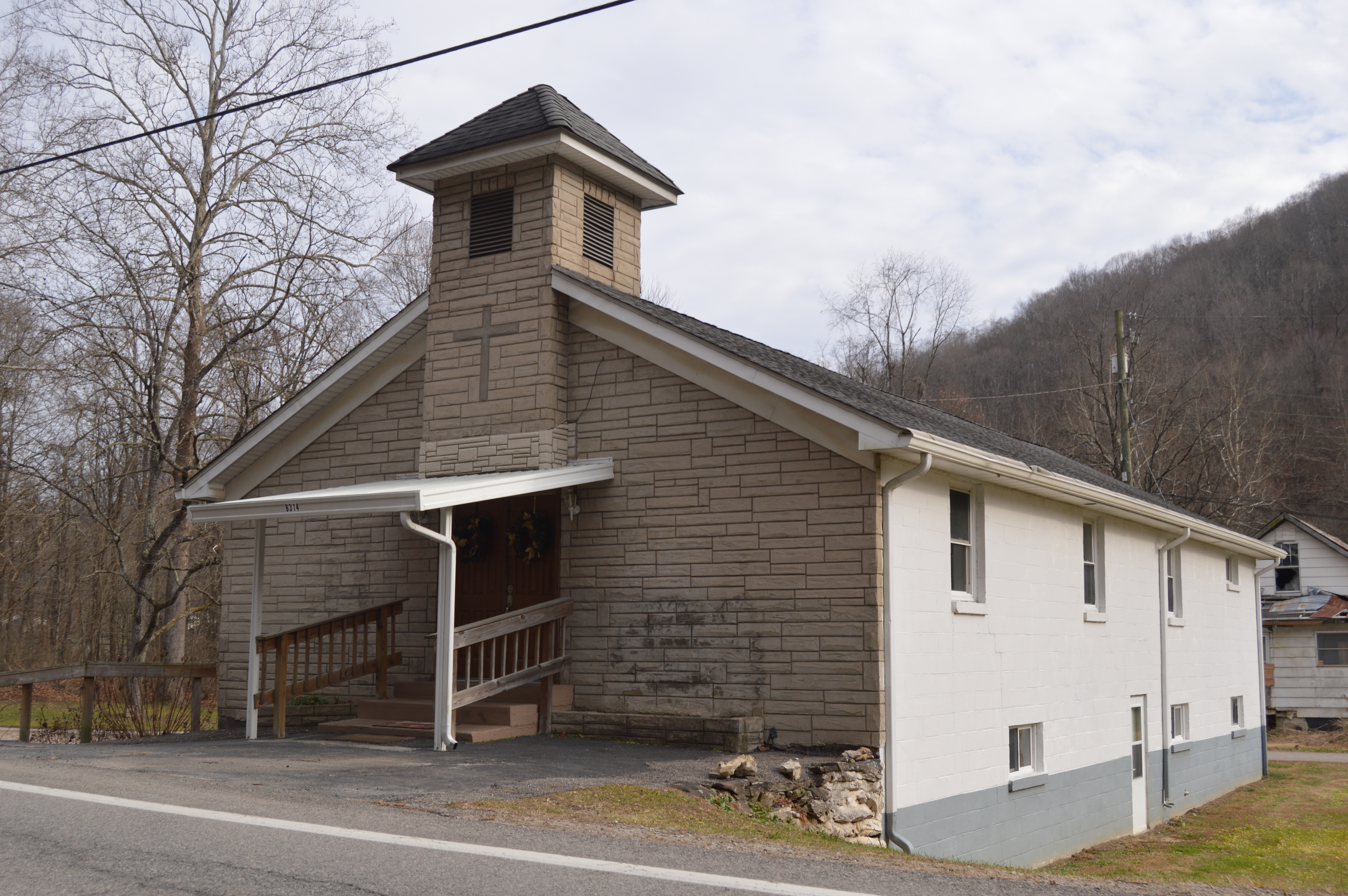
- Baptist church on WV 85

- Location within the state of West Virginia Quinland (the United States)
- Coordinates: 38°1′0″N 81°46′12″W
- Country: United States
- State: West Virginia
- County: Boone
- Elevation: 741 ft (226 m)
- Time zone: UTC-5 (Eastern (EST))
  - Summer (DST): UTC-4 (EDT)
- GNIS ID: 1555427

Quinland is an unincorporated community in Boone County, West Virginia, United States.
