= Lanta =

Lanta or LANTA may refer to:

== Places ==
- Lanta, West Virginia, United States
- Lanta, Haute-Garonne, France
- Lanta Islands, Thailand
  - Ko Lanta Yai, the largest of the Lanta Islands
  - Ko Lanta Noi, in Ko Lanta District
- Koh Lanta National Park, Krabi Province, Thailand

== Other uses ==
- LANta, a public transportation system serving the Lehigh Valley region of eastern Pennsylvania
- Lanta (cockroach), a genus of cockroaches in the family Ectobiidae
- Christian Lanta, rugby coach for Lyon OU

== See also ==
- Lantana (disambiguation)
