= Madison National Bank =

- U.S. National Register of Historic Places
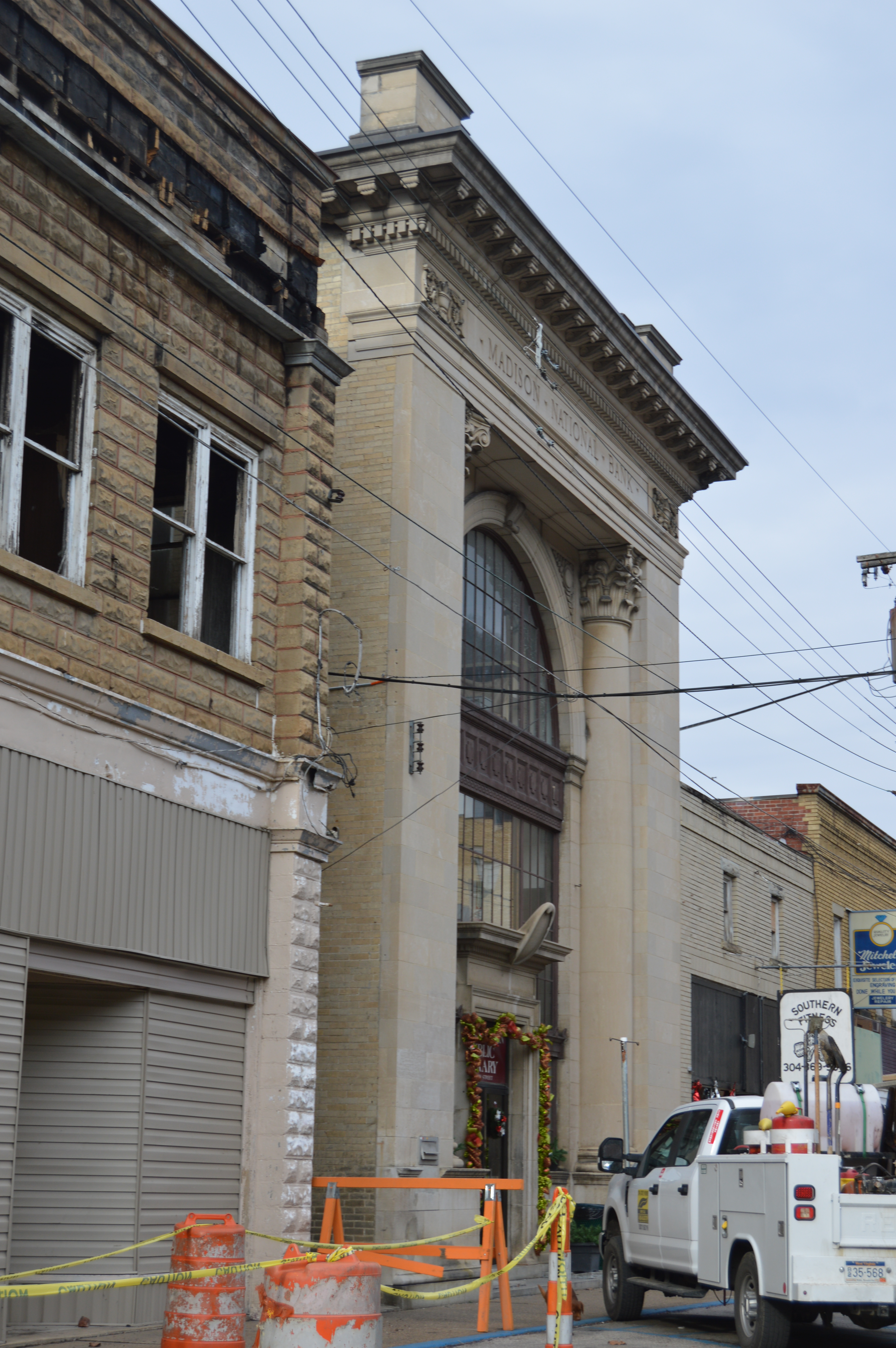
- Front, seen from the south

- Location within West Virginia Location within the United States
- Location: 375 Main St., Madison, West Virginia
- Coordinates: 38°3′50.5″N 81°49′20.5″W
- Area: Less than 1 acre (0.40 ha)
- Built: 1918
- Architect: J.J. West & Co.
- Architectural style: Beaux Arts
- NRHP reference No.: 07000779
- Added to NRHP: August 2, 2007

Madison National Bank, now known as Boone-Madison Public Library, is a historic bank building located at Madison, Boone County, West Virginia, United States. It was built in 1918, and is a three-story, rectangular, brick building with a symmetrical limestone façade in the Beaux-Arts style. It has a flat roof and parapet. The front facade features a three-story, multi-light, arched window opening flanked on either side by Corinthian order pilasters. The building housed a bank until 1974, when it was donated to the Library Commission.

It was listed on the National Register of Historic Places in 2007.
