= Jeffrey, West Virginia =

- Unincorporated community
- Location within West Virginia Location within the United States
- Coordinates: 37°58′17″N 81°49′17″W
- Country: United States
- State: West Virginia
- County: Boone
- Elevation: 784 ft (239 m)
- Time zone: UTC-5 (Eastern (EST))
  - Summer (DST): UTC-4 (EDT)
- ZIP code: 25114
- Area codes: 304 & 681
- GNIS feature ID: 1540853

Jeffrey is an unincorporated community and coal town in Boone County, West Virginia, United States. Jeffrey is located on West Virginia Route 17, 5 miles (8.0 km) south of Madison. Jeffrey has a post office with ZIP code 25114. Jeffrey Is located along the Spruce/Laurel River.
