= Maxine =

Maxine or Maxene may refer to:

== People ==
- Maxene Andrews (1916–1995), member of The Andrews Sisters singing trio
- Maxine Audley (1923–1992), English actress
- Maxine Brown (country singer) (1932–2019), American country music singer
- Maxine Brown (soul singer) (born 1939), American soul and R&B singer
- Maxine D. Brown, American computer scientist
- Maxine Carr, convicted of perverting the course of justice in relation to the Soham murders (not to be confused with Maxine Moore Carr / Maxine Waters)
- Maxine Dexter (born 1972), American politician
- Maxine Elliott (1868–1940), American actress
- Maxine Fassberg (born 1953), CEO, Intel Israel
- Maxine Fleming, New Zealand television screenwriter and producer
- Maxine Funke, New Zealand singer-songwriter
- Maxine Hong Kingston (born 1940), Chinese American author and Professor Emerita
- Maxine Kumin (1925–2014), American poet and author
- Maxine Mawhinney (born 1957), newsreader on the BBC News 24-hour television channel
- Maxine McKew (born 1953), Australian politician and journalist
- Maxene Magalona (born 1986), Filipina actress
- Maxine Medina (born 1990), Filipino model, beauty pageant titleholder, Miss Universe Philippines 2016, and top 6 Miss Universe 2016
- Maxine Mosley, American politician
- Maxine Munt (1912–2000), American dancer, educator
- Maxine Nightingale (born 1952), British R&B and soul music singer
- Maxine Peake (born 1974), English actress
- Maxine Reiner (1916–2003), American actress
- Maxine Sanders (born 1946), British Wiccan
- Maxine Seymour, Bahamian politician
- Maxine Sullivan (born Marietta Williams, 1911–1987), American jazz vocalist/performer
- Maxine Waters (born Maxine Moore Carr, born 1938), American politician
- Maxine (wrestler) (born 1986), stage name of American former professional wrestler, model, and former WWE Diva Karlee Pérez

=== Fictional characters ===
- Maxine Baker, daughter of Animal Man (Buddy Baker) in DC Comics
- Maxine Barlow, from the British drama series Waterloo Road
- Max Caulfield, or Maxine, main character in the video game Life Is Strange
- Maxine Chadway, from the television series Soul Food
- Maxine Conway, from the Australian drama series, Wentworth
- Maxine Gray, from the American television series, Judging Amy
- Maxine Lund, character in Being John Malkovich
- Maxine Mayfield, "Max" or "Madmax", on the Netflix series Stranger Things
- Maxine Minniver, from the British soap opera, Hollyoaks
- Maxine Minx, a main protagonist of the X and MaXXXine
- Maxine Peacock, from the British soap opera, Coronation Street
- Maxine Shaw, from the American television sitcom Living Single
- Maxine Tarnow, main character in Thomas Pynchon's novel Bleeding Edge

== Media ==
=== Music ===
- "Maxine" (Sharon O'Neill song), a song from Sharon O'Neill
- "Maxine", a 2007 reissue bonus track on the album Traveling Wilburys Vol. 1
- "Maxine", a song by John Legend from the album Once Again
- "Maxine", a song by Donald Fagen from the album The Nightfly
- "Maxine", a 1996 rap song by Eminem from the album Infinite

=== Television ===
- Maxine (TV series), 2022 drama based on the story of Maxine Carr's involvement in the Soham murders

== Places ==
- Maxine, West Virginia, an unincorporated community

== Other uses ==
- 3977 Maxine, an asteroid, see List of minor planets: 3001–4000
- Maxine Virtual Machine, an open source Java virtual machine
- Nvidia Maxine, a suite of AI conferencing software
- Maxine the Fluffy Corgi, a corgi popularized on social media

== See also ==
- Max (disambiguation)
- Maximilian
- Maximus (disambiguation)
- Maxine (given name)
