= Ramage, West Virginia =

- Unincorporated community
- Location within West Virginia Location within the United States
- Coordinates: 37°59′03″N 81°49′31″W
- Country: United States
- State: West Virginia
- County: Boone
- Elevation: 810 ft (250 m)
- Time zone: UTC-5 (Eastern (EST))
  - Summer (DST): UTC-4 (EDT)
- Area codes: 304 & 681
- GNIS feature ID: 1545391

Ramage is an unincorporated community in Boone County, West Virginia, United States. Ramage is located on West Virginia Route 17, 5 miles (8.0 km) south of Madison.

The community was named after J. B. Ramage, a mining official.
