= Uneeda, West Virginia =

Uneeda
- Unincorporated community
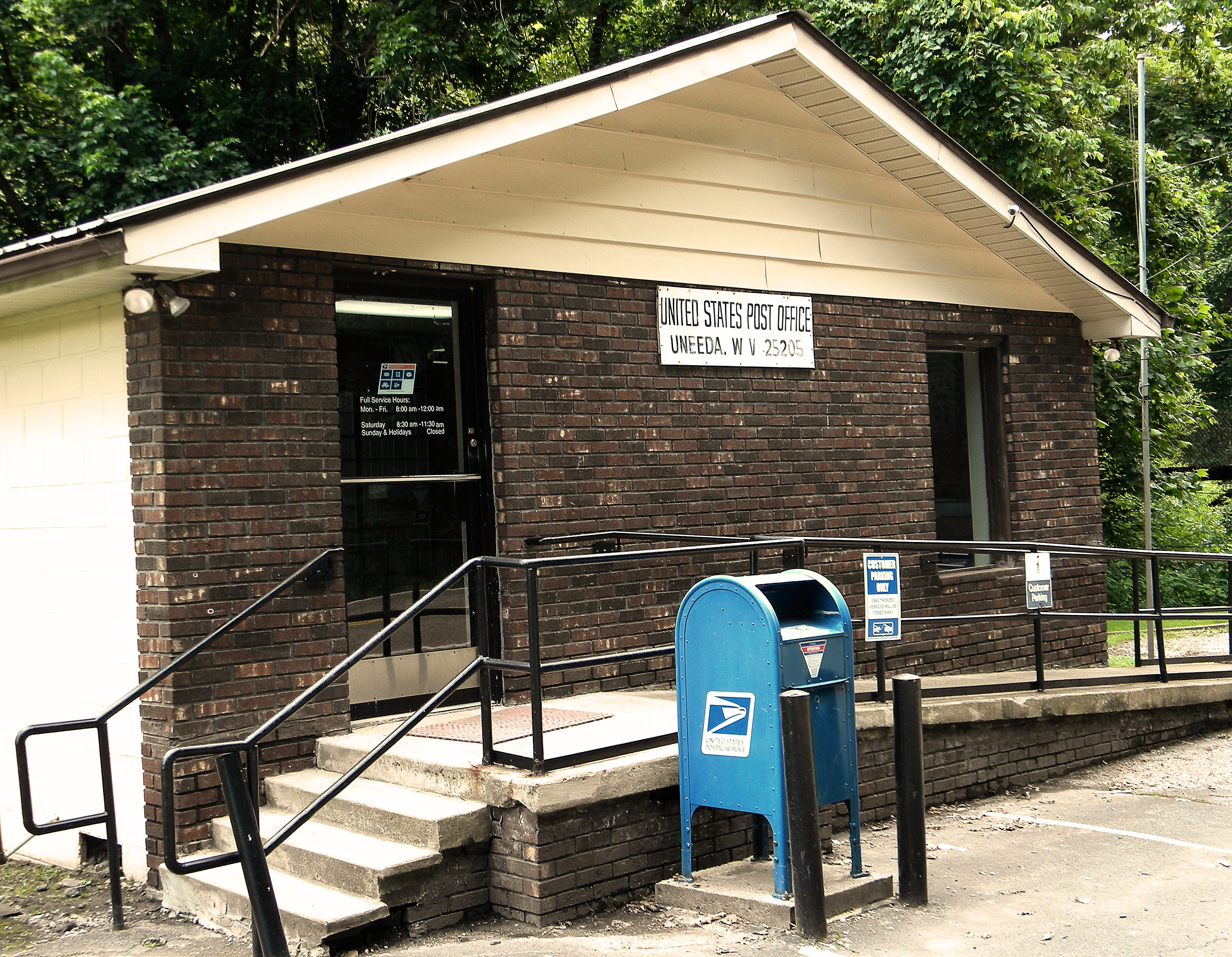
- Uneeda, West Virginia Post Office

- Location within the state of West Virginia Uneeda (the United States)
- Coordinates: 38°2′8″N 81°46′50″W
- Country: United States
- State: West Virginia
- County: Boone
- Time zone: UTC-5 (Eastern (EST))
  - Summer (DST): UTC-4 (EDT)
- ZIP codes: 25205
- Area code: 304
- GNIS feature ID: 1548460

Uneeda is an unincorporated community on the Pond Fork River in Boone County in the U.S. state of West Virginia. The town lies along West Virginia Route 85. The community was named after a brand of biscuit, Uneeda.

== Mining accident ==
On February 1, 2006, a bulldozer operator was killed at the Black Castle Surface Mine operated by Massey Energy Company's subsidiary Elk Run Coal Company in Uneeda. This fatality along with another one in a separate incident in Wharton, also in Boone County, caused West Virginia Governor Joe Manchin to call for a "stand-down on mine safety" at West Virginia's mines.

== Climate ==
The climate in this area is characterized by hot, humid summers and generally mild to cool winters. According to the Köppen Climate Classification system, Uneeda has a humid subtropical climate, abbreviated "Cfa" on climate maps.
