= Comfort, West Virginia =

- Census-designated place
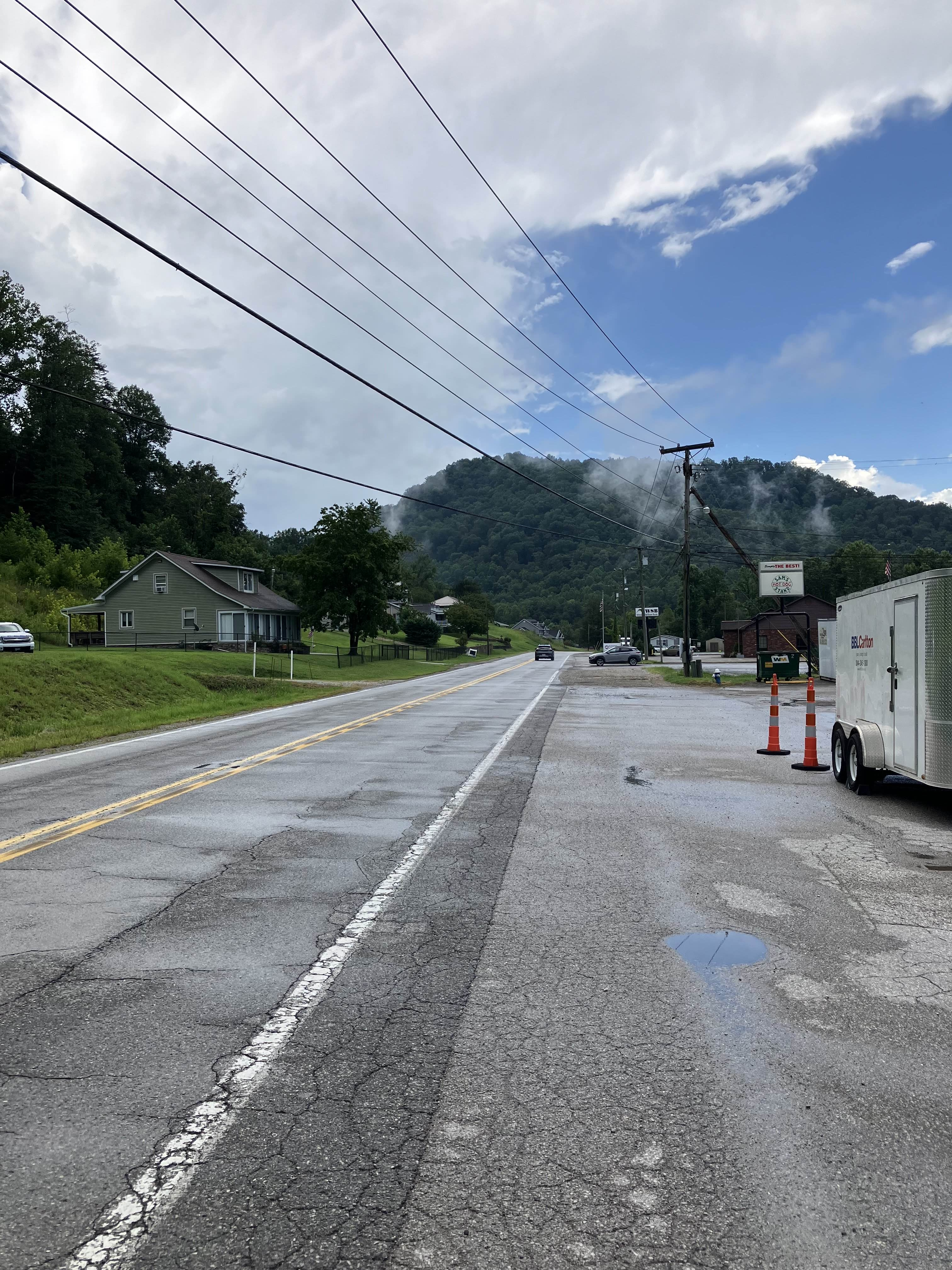
- Comfort, West Virginia along WV 3

- Location within West Virginia Comfort (the United States)
- Coordinates: 38°07′49″N 81°36′56″W
- Country: United States
- State: West Virginia
- County: Boone

Area
  - Total: 1.004 sq mi (2.60 km^{2})
  - Land: 1.004 sq mi (2.60 km^{2})
  - Water: 0 sq mi (0 km^{2})
- Elevation: 692 ft (211 m)

Population (2020)
  - Total: 320
  - Density: 320/sq mi (120/km^{2})
- Time zone: UTC-5 (Eastern (EST))
  - Summer (DST): UTC-4 (EDT)
- ZIP code: 25049
- Area codes: 304 & 681
- GNIS feature ID: 1537547

Comfort is a census-designated place (CDP) in Boone County, West Virginia, United States. Comfort is located on West Virginia Route 3, 12 miles (19 km) northeast of Madison. Comfort has a post office with ZIP code 25049. As of the 2020 census, its population is 320 (up from 306 at the 2010 census). Comfort is the home of Sherman Elementary School.
