= Clinton, Boone County, West Virginia =

Clinton
- Unincorporated community
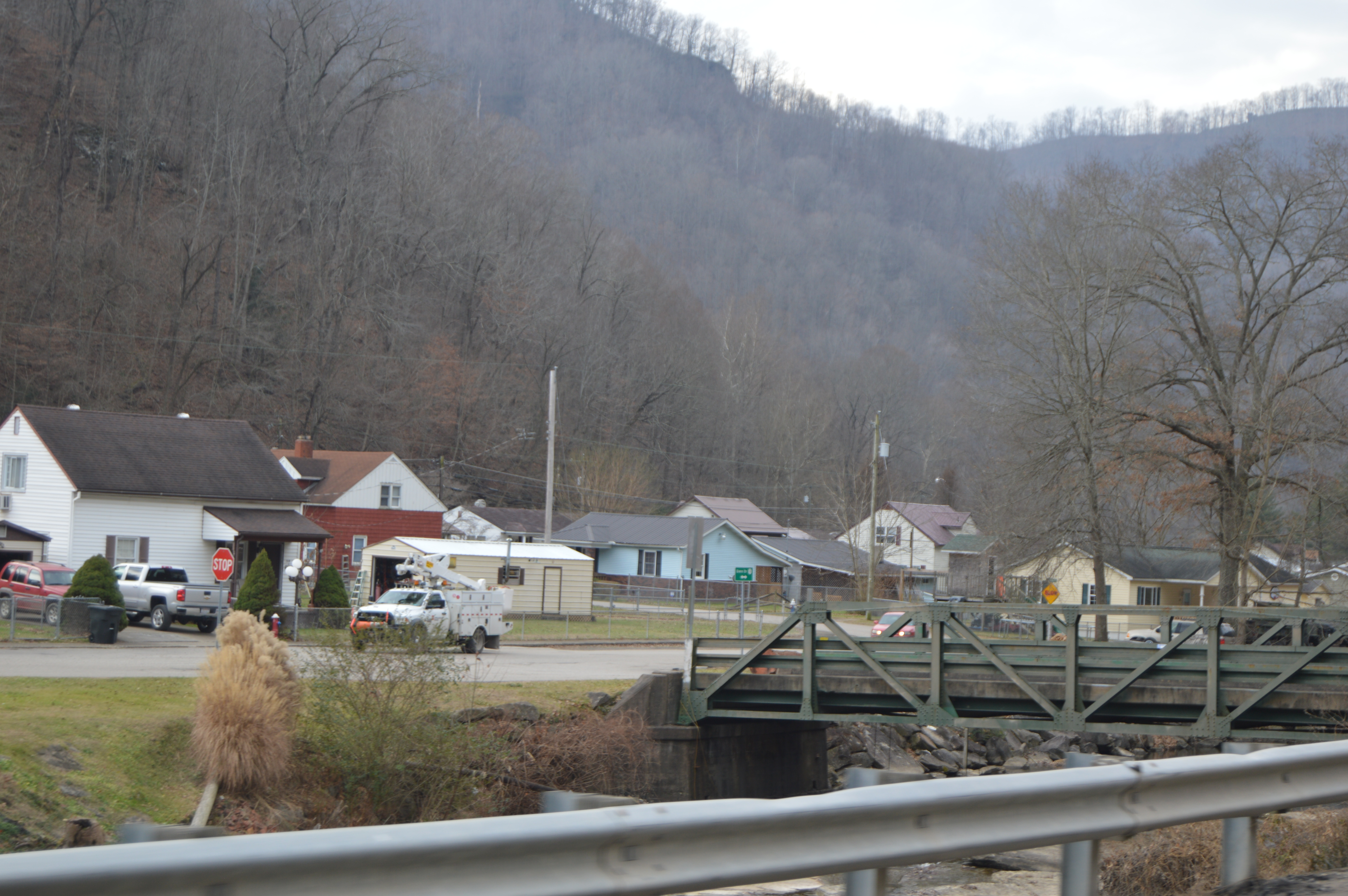
- Overview from WV 85

- Location within the state of West Virginia Clinton (the United States)
- Coordinates: 37°52′57″N 81°39′5″W
- Country: United States
- State: West Virginia
- County: Boone
- Elevation: 1,033 ft (315 m)
- Time zone: UTC-5 (Eastern (EST))
  - Summer (DST): UTC-4 (EDT)
- GNIS ID: 1537418

Clinton is an unincorporated community in Boone County, West Virginia, United States.
