= High Coal, West Virginia =

Unincorporated community in Boone County, West Virginia

High Coal
- Unincorporated community
- Location within the state of West Virginia High Coal (the United States)
- Coordinates: 37°59′54″N 81°28′45″W
- Country: United States
- State: West Virginia
- County: Boone
- Elevation: 1,345 ft (410 m)
- Time zone: UTC-5 (Eastern (EST))
  - Summer (DST): UTC-4 (EDT)
- GNIS feature ID: 1540243

High Coal or Highcoal is an unincorporated community and coal town located along Seng Creek in Boone County, West Virginia, United States. It is the birthplace of former professional baseball player and Philadelphia Warriors draft pick Corky Withrow. Samuel C. Burns was appointed the first postmaster in 1910. The post office remained in operation until 1962, when it was discontinued, and the mail redirected to Garrison.
