= Low Gap =

Low Gap and Lowgap may refer to:

- Low Gap, Kentucky, an unincorporated community in Johnson County
- Lowgap, North Carolina, an unincorporated community in Surry County
- Low Gap, West Virginia, an unincorporated community in Boone County
