= Van, West Virginia =

- Census-designated place
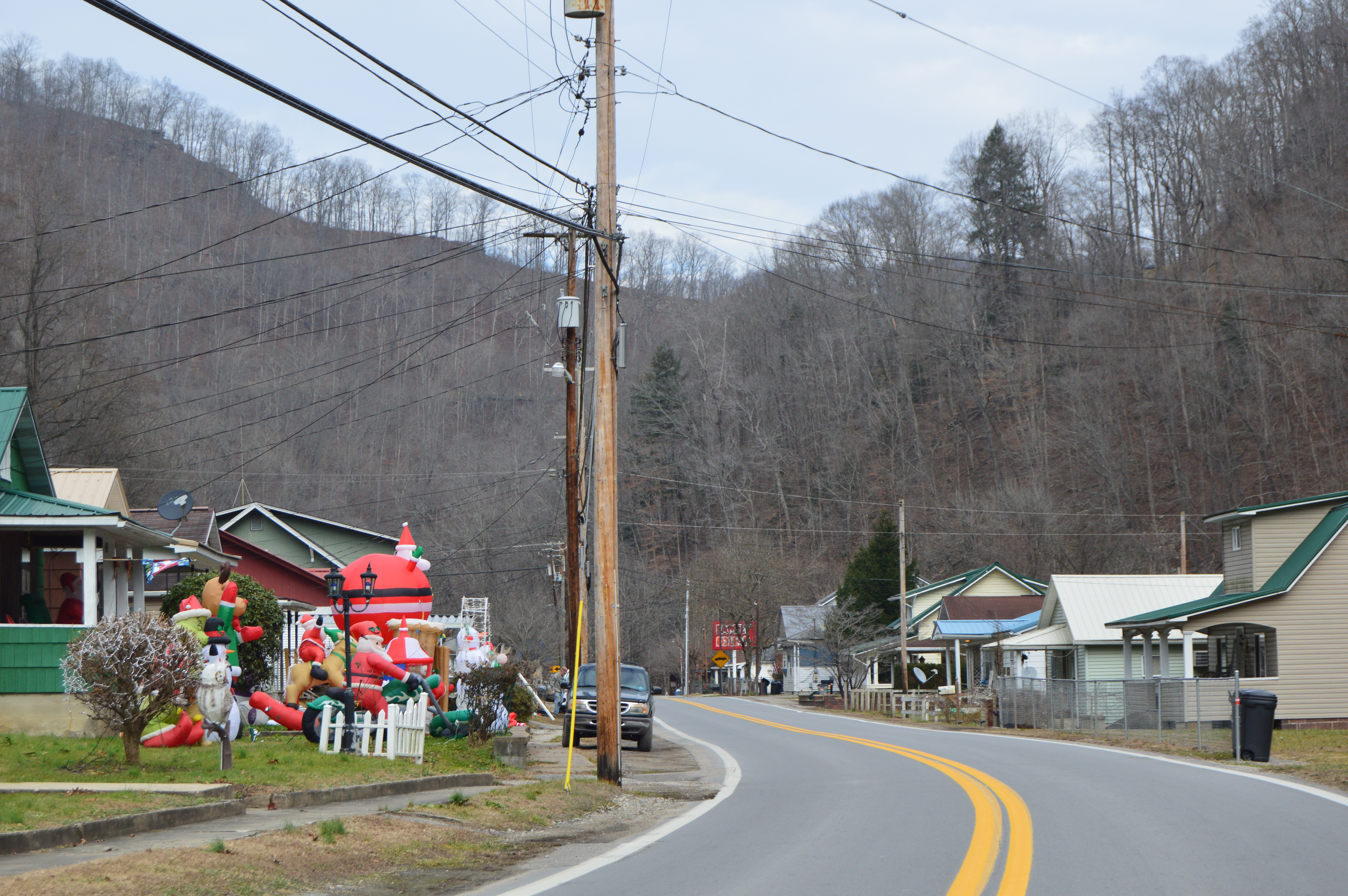
- Houses on WV 85

- Location within West Virginia and the United States Van (the United States)
- Coordinates: 37°58′16″N 81°42′39″W
- Country: United States
- State: West Virginia
- County: Boone

Area
  - Total: 0.614 sq mi (1.59 km^{2})
  - Land: 0.598 sq mi (1.55 km^{2})
  - Water: 0.016 sq mi (0.041 km^{2})

Population (2020)
  - Total: 177
  - Density: 296/sq mi (114/km^{2})
- Time zone: UTC-5 (Eastern (EST))
  - Summer (DST): UTC-4 (EDT)
- ZIP codes: 25206

Van is a census-designated place (CDP) in Boone County, West Virginia, United States, along the Pond Fork of the Little Coal River. As of the 2020 census, its population was 177 (down from 211 at the 2010 census). Its ZIP code is 25206. Van was named after Van Linville, who established its post office and served as its first postmaster.

== Geography ==
Van is one of the many small communities on West Virginia Route 85, which winds through valley after valley staying close beside the Little Coal River. West Junction, for example, is immediately to the north and across the Little Coal.

Van is mostly residential with a gas station, a pharmacy, a flower shop, a few churches, a pizza take out, an elementary school, a junior/senior high school, a Christian school, a volunteer fire department, an Ambulance Station, and a Senior Nutrition Center. The Pond Fork of the Little Coal river that runs through Van is a designated stream that the West Virginia Department of Natural Resources stocks fish, such as trout, a few times a year.

== Schools ==
Van High School, which was formerly known as Crook District High School, is nestled up on "The Hill" overlooking the rural town of Van. Van Junior-Senior High School and Van Elementary School are both located on Bulldog Blvd.

Van High School has also been very successful in athletics as it competes in the West Virginia Secondary Schools Activities Commission. Its mascot is a Bulldog and its school colors are Blue and Gold. The Bulldogs compete in Class Single A, which is the smallest of three classes in West Virginia. Van High is one of only three high schools in Boone County.

Baseball has won five state championships in 1982 (AA), 1988 (A), 1991(A), 1992(A), 1993(A) and the state runner-up six times 1981, 1984, 1986, 1987, 1995, 1996, 2004 and 2007. They have been in the state tournament, which includes the final four from each class a record 19 times since 1981.

Football has appeared in the state playoffs ten times since 1981. Playoff years include 1981(A), 1983(A), 1984(A), 1986(A), 1991(A), 1992(A), 1993(A), 1996(A), 2001(A), and 2003(A). The Bulldogs advanced to the final eight teams in 1981, 1983, 1984, 1991, 1993, and 2001. They advanced to the final four in 1986 and 1992.

Basketball has appeared in the regional finals on four occasions, which is the last game before the state tournament is held in Charleston. They have won sectional finals in 1977(AA), 1995(A), 1996(A), and 2002(A). In 1991–1992, a multimillion-dollar gymnasium was built to take the place of one of the only "domed" gyms in West Virginia.

Girls Basketball has won a state championship (A) in 1982. They also advanced to the state tournament in 1983.

== Notable people ==
- Hasil Adkins- Appalachian Rockabilly one man band who recorded many songs, appeared in movies and TV shows and was featured in a documentary, "The Wild World Of Hasil Adkins."
- Robin Davis- former West Virginia Supreme Court Justice
- Jesco White- folk dancer featured in documentaries, TV shows and popular songs.
- Tony Gibson- head football coach of the Marshall Thundering Herd
