= Rumble, West Virginia =

Unincorporated community in Boone County, West Virginia

Rumble
- Unincorporated community
- Location within the state of West Virginia Rumble (the United States)
- Coordinates: 38°11′0″N 81°41′57″W
- Country: United States
- State: West Virginia
- County: Boone
- Elevation: 705 ft (215 m)
- Time zone: UTC-5 (Eastern (EST))
  - Summer (DST): UTC-4 (EDT)
- GNIS ID: 1555538

Rumble is an unincorporated community in Boone County, West Virginia, United States. It is located on Lick Creek above Ashford. The first postmaster was Walter J. Rumble, appointed in 1924. The post office was discontinued in 1933, and the mail redirected to Ashford.
