= Bob White, West Virginia =

Bob White
- Unincorporated community
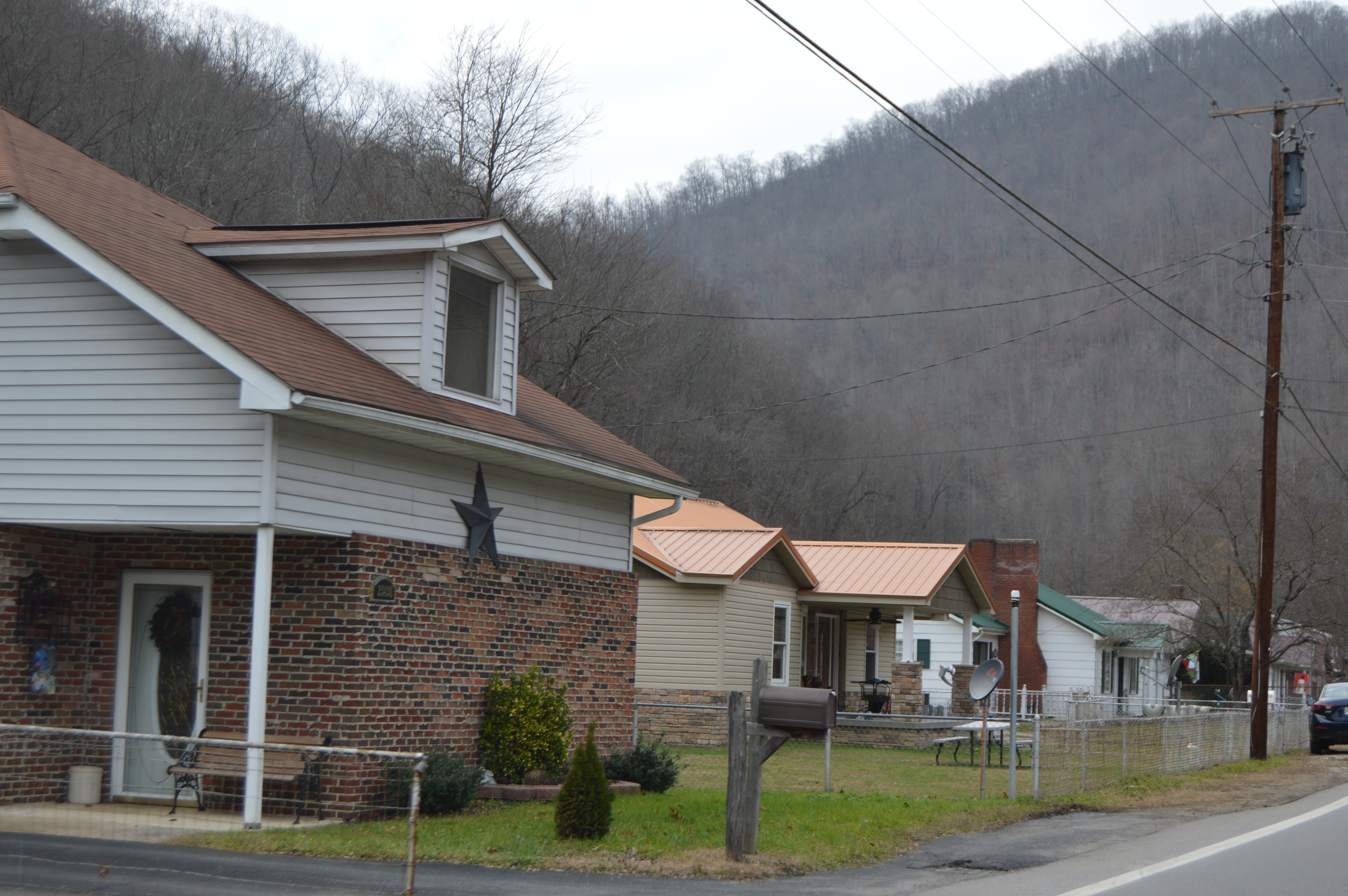
- Houses on WV 85

- Location within the state of West Virginia Bob White (the United States)
- Coordinates: 37°57′15″N 81°43′6″W
- Country: United States
- State: West Virginia
- County: Boone
- Time zone: UTC-5 (Eastern (EST))
  - Summer (DST): UTC-4 (EDT)
- ZIP codes: 25028
- GNIS feature ID: 1536180

Bob White is an unincorporated community located on West Virginia Route 85 in Boone County in the U.S. state of West Virginia. The community's ZIP code is 25028. Most of Bob White's residents are employed by the coal mining industry. The Bob White Post Office closed November 12, 2011.
