= Brushton, West Virginia =

Unincorporated community in West Virginia, United States

- Unincorporated community
- Location within West Virginia Location within the United States
- Coordinates: 38°09′58″N 81°42′32″W
- Country: United States
- State: West Virginia
- County: Boone
- Elevation: 656 ft (200 m)
- Time zone: UTC-5 (Eastern (EST))
  - Summer (DST): UTC-4 (EDT)
- ZIP code: 25051
- Area codes: 304 & 681
- GNIS feature ID: 1549613

Brushton, also known as Costa, is an unincorporated community in Boone County, West Virginia, United States. Brushton is 9 miles (14 km) northeast of Madison. Brushton has a post office with ZIP code 25051; the post office uses the name Costa.
