= Washington Heights, West Virginia =

Washington Heights
- Unincorporated community
- Location within the state of West Virginia Washington Heights (the United States)
- Coordinates: 38°2′8″N 81°49′53″W
- Country: United States
- State: West Virginia
- County: Boone
- Time zone: UTC-5 (Eastern (EST))
  - Summer (DST): UTC-4 (EDT)

Washington Heights is an unincorporated community on the Spruce Fork in Boone County in the U.S. state of West Virginia. Washington Heights lies to the south of Madison on West Virginia Route 17.
