= Bigson, West Virginia =

Bigson
- Unincorporated community
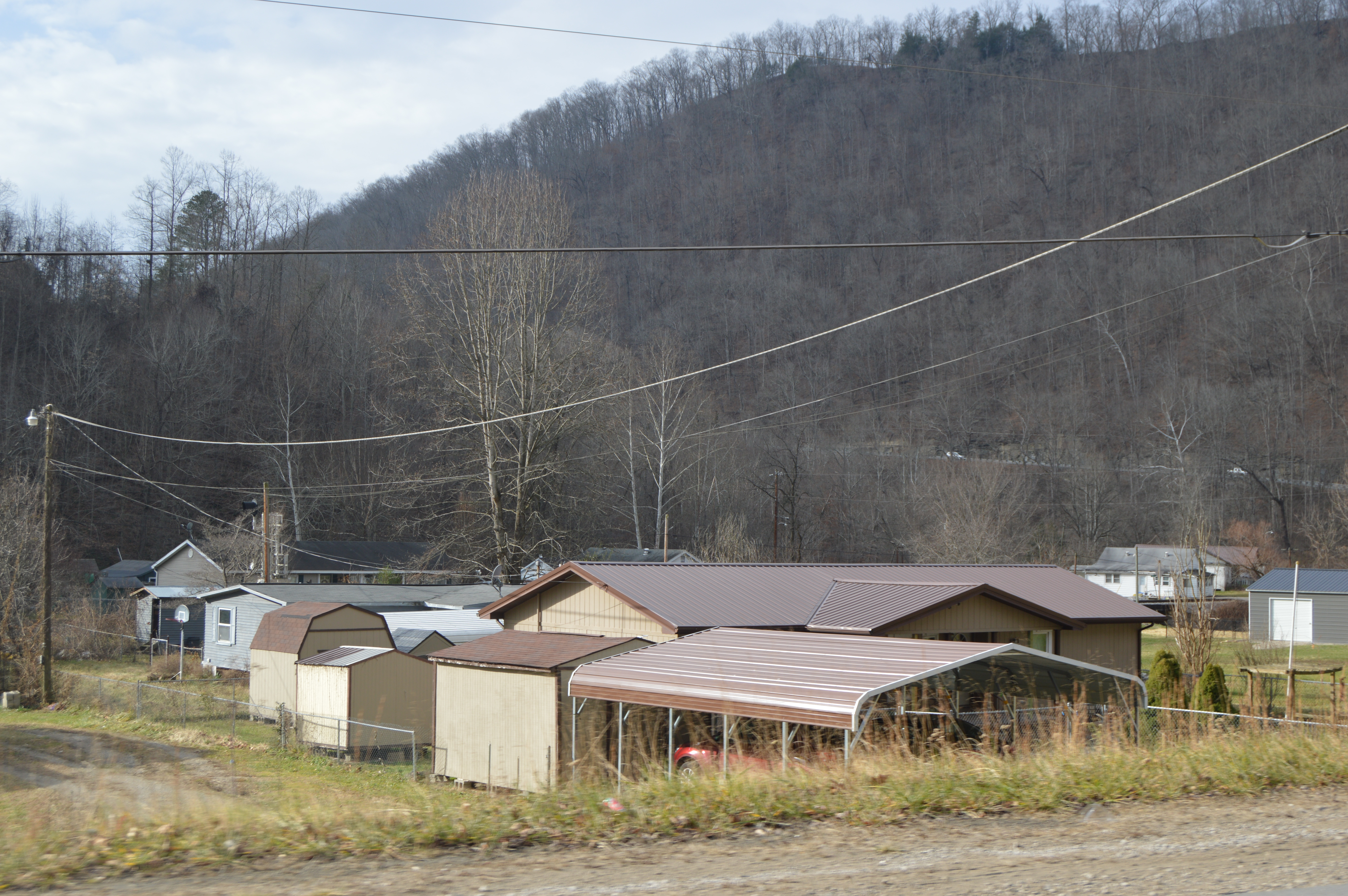
- Residences on WV 85

- Location within the state of West Virginia Bigson (the United States)
- Coordinates: 37°59′29″N 81°43′24″W
- Country: United States
- State: West Virginia
- County: Boone
- Elevation: 801 ft (244 m)
- Time zone: UTC-5 (Eastern (EST))
  - Summer (DST): UTC-4 (EDT)
- GNIS ID: 1535993

Bigson is an unincorporated community in Boone County, West Virginia, United States.
