= Morrisvale, West Virginia =

- Unincorporated community
- Location within West Virginia Location within the United States
- Coordinates: 38°08′09″N 81°54′44″W
- Country: United States
- State: West Virginia
- County: Boone
- Elevation: 771 ft (235 m)
- Time zone: UTC-5 (Eastern (EST))
  - Summer (DST): UTC-4 (EDT)
- Area codes: 304 & 681
- GNIS feature ID: 1555162

Morrisvale is an unincorporated community and coal town in Boone County, West Virginia, United States. Morrisvale is located on County Route 8 and Jack Smith Run, 7 miles (11 km) northwest of Madison.

The community derives its name from Page Morris, a coal-mining official.
