= South Madison, West Virginia =

South Madison
- Unincorporated community
- Location within the state of West Virginia South Madison (the United States)
- Coordinates: 38°3′13″N 81°48′20″W
- Country: United States
- State: West Virginia
- County: Boone
- Elevation: 696 ft (212 m)
- Time zone: UTC-5 (Eastern (EST))
  - Summer (DST): UTC-4 (EDT)
- GNIS ID: 1555669

South Madison is an unincorporated community in Boone County, West Virginia, United States.
