= Marnie, West Virginia =

Marnie
- Unincorporated community
- Location within the state of West Virginia Marnie (the United States)
- Coordinates: 37°57′19″N 81°39′23″W
- Country: United States
- State: West Virginia
- County: Boone
- Elevation: 932 ft (284 m)
- Time zone: UTC-5 (Eastern (EST))
  - Summer (DST): UTC-4 (EDT)
- GNIS ID: 1555053

Marnie is an unincorporated community in Boone County, West Virginia, United States.
