= Keith, West Virginia =

Keith
- Unincorporated community
- Location within the state of West Virginia Keith (the United States)
- Coordinates: 38°2′34″N 81°34′25″W
- Country: United States
- State: West Virginia
- County: Boone
- Elevation: 758 ft (231 m)
- Time zone: UTC-5 (Eastern (EST))
  - Summer (DST): UTC-4 (EDT)
- GNIS ID: 1541116

Keith is an unincorporated community and coal town in Boone County, West Virginia, United States.
