= Peytona, West Virginia =

- Unincorporated community
- Location within West Virginia Location within the United States
- Coordinates: 38°08′29″N 81°41′04″W
- Country: United States
- State: West Virginia
- County: Boone
- Elevation: 702 ft (214 m)
- Time zone: UTC-5 (Eastern (EST))
  - Summer (DST): UTC-4 (EDT)
- ZIP code: 25154
- Area codes: 304 & 681
- GNIS feature ID: 1555337

Peytona is an unincorporated community in Boone County, West Virginia, United States. Peytona is located on the Big Coal River and West Virginia Route 3, 9 miles (14 km) northeast of Madison. Peytona has a post office with ZIP code 25154.

== History ==
As early as 1000 CE, Native Americans inhabited present-day Peytona. In 1742, John Peter Salley discovered coal while on an expedition in the vicinity. Peytona was named for William Madison Peyton, who promoted coal mining and navigation on Coal River. A lawyer and landowner from a Virginia family, Peyton was chief executive of the Coal River Navigation Company, which locked and dammed the river during the 1840s. As a result, steamboats could navigate the Coal River and transport coal to larger markets. Peyton was also instrumental in the formation of Boone County, organized in 1847 from Kanawha, Cabell, and Logan counties. In 1906, Madison was named the county seat, honoring the same man.

== Recreation ==
Peytona is home of Drawdy Falls Park.

== Notable person ==
- John E. Kenna, twice elected U.S. senator for West Virginia
