= Hopkins Fork, West Virginia =

Hopkins Fork
- Unincorporated community
- Location within the state of West Virginia Hopkins Fork (the United States)
- Coordinates: 38°4′59″N 81°38′28″W
- Country: United States
- State: West Virginia
- County: Boone
- Elevation: 722 ft (220 m)
- Time zone: UTC-5 (Eastern (EST))
  - Summer (DST): UTC-4 (EDT)
- GNIS ID: 1540454

Hopkins Fork is an unincorporated community in Boone County, West Virginia, United States.
