= Cazy, West Virginia =

Cazy
- Unincorporated community
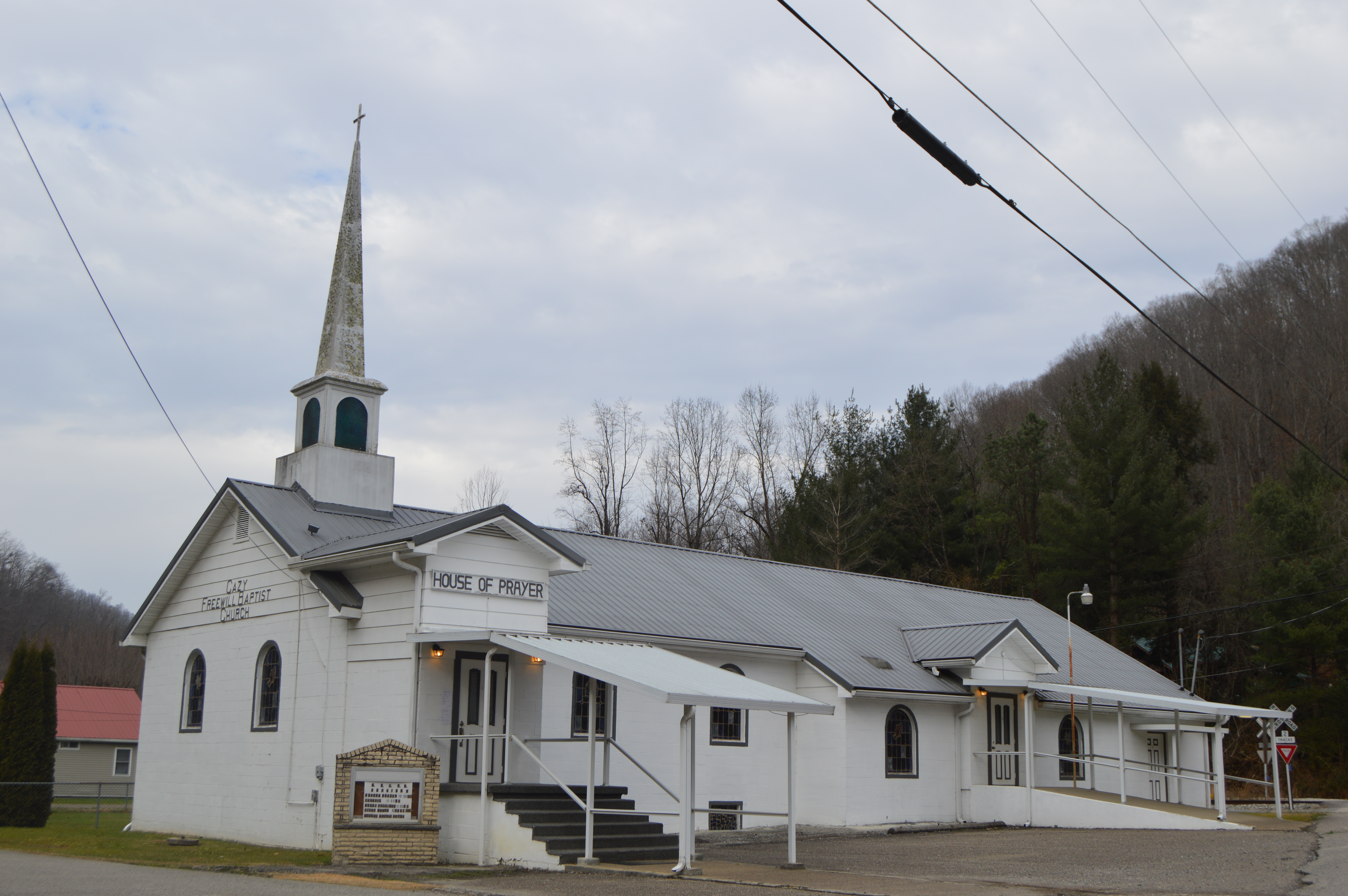
- Baptist church

- Location within the state of West Virginia Cazy (the United States)
- Coordinates: 37°56′32″N 81°42′35″W
- Country: United States
- State: West Virginia
- County: Boone
- Elevation: 856 ft (261 m)
- Time zone: UTC-5 (Eastern (EST))
  - Summer (DST): UTC-4 (EDT)
- GNIS ID: 1554088

Cazy is an unincorporated community in Boone County, West Virginia, United States.
