= Ridgeview, Boone County, West Virginia =

Ridgeview, West Virginia
- Unincorporated community
- Location within West Virginia Location within the United States
- Coordinates: 38°08′18″N 81°45′34″W
- Country: United States
- State: West Virginia
- County: Boone
- Elevation: 797 ft (243 m)
- Time zone: UTC-5 (Eastern (EST))
  - Summer (DST): UTC-4 (EDT)
- ZIP code: 25169
- Area codes: 304 & 681
- GNIS feature ID: 1545579

Ridgeview is an unincorporated community in Boone County, West Virginia, United States. Ridgeview is 6 miles (9.7 km) northeast of Madison. Ridgeview has a post office with ZIP code 25169.
