= Kohlsaat, West Virginia =

Kohlsaat
- Unincorporated community
- Location within the state of West Virginia Kohlsaat (the United States)
- Coordinates: 37°56′30″N 81°42′16″W
- Country: United States
- State: West Virginia
- County: Boone
- Elevation: 860 ft (260 m)
- Time zone: UTC-5 (Eastern (EST))
  - Summer (DST): UTC-4 (EDT)
- GNIS ID: 1554895

Kohlsaat is an unincorporated community in Boone County, West Virginia, United States. Part of Kohlsaat became Marthatown.
