= Kirbyton, West Virginia =

Kirbyton
- Unincorporated community
- Location within the state of West Virginia Kirbyton (the United States)
- Coordinates: 38°05′55″N 81°36′47″W
- Country: United States
- State: West Virginia
- County: Boone
- Elevation: 705 ft (215 m)
- Time zone: UTC-5 (Eastern (EST))
  - Summer (DST): UTC-4 (EDT)
- GNIS ID: 1554887

Kirbyton is an unincorporated community in Boone County, West Virginia, United States.
