= Lantana (disambiguation) =

Lantana is a plant genus.

Lantana may also refer to:

- Lantana (fabric), a mixture of typically 80% cotton and 20% wool
- Lantana (film), a 2001 Australian film
- Lantana (singer) (born 1980), Spanish artist
- Lantana, Florida, United States
- Lantana, Denton County, Texas, United States
- Lantana, Cameron County, Texas, United States
- FC Lantana Tallinn, a defunct Estonian football club
- Viburnum lantana, a plant species

== See also ==
- Lanta (disambiguation)
- Lanthana, the white powdery form of lanthanum oxide
