= Foch, West Virginia =

Unincorporated community in West Virginia, United States

Foch
- Unincorporated community
- Location within the state of West Virginia Foch (the United States)
- Coordinates: 38°2′24″N 81°47′34″W
- Country: United States
- State: West Virginia
- County: Boone
- Time zone: UTC-5 (Eastern (EST))
  - Summer (DST): UTC-4 (EDT)
- GNIS feature ID: 1554479

Foch is an unincorporated community in Boone County in the U.S. state of West Virginia.
