= Altman, West Virginia =

Unincorporated community in West Virginia, United States

Altman
- Unincorporated community
- Location within the state of West Virginia Altman (the United States)
- Coordinates: 38°9′52″N 81°52′4″W
- Country: United States
- State: West Virginia
- County: Boone
- Elevation: 666 ft (203 m)
- Time zone: UTC-5 (Eastern (EST))
  - Summer (DST): UTC-4 (EDT)
- GNIS ID: 1741699

Altman is an unincorporated community and coal town in Boone County, West Virginia, United States. Their post office has closed.
