= Easly, West Virginia =

Unincorporated community in West Virginia, United States

Easly
- Unincorporated community
- Location within the state of West Virginia Easly (the United States)
- Coordinates: 38°9′8″N 81°43′59″W
- Country: United States
- State: West Virginia
- County: Boone
- Elevation: 728 ft (222 m)
- Time zone: UTC-5 (Eastern (EST))
  - Summer (DST): UTC-4 (EDT)
- GNIS ID: 1538500

Easly is an unincorporated community in Boone County, West Virginia, United States.
