= Powell Creek, West Virginia =

Powell Creek
- Unincorporated community
- Location within the state of West Virginia Powell Creek (the United States)
- Coordinates: 38°0′48″N 81°49′31″W
- Country: United States
- State: West Virginia
- County: Boone
- Elevation: 771 ft (235 m)
- Time zone: UTC-5 (Eastern (EST))
  - Summer (DST): UTC-4 (EDT)
- GNIS ID: 1545215

Powell Creek is an unincorporated community in Boone County, West Virginia, United States. The Powell Creek Post Office was once known as Coalbloom a former coal town.
