= Cameo, West Virginia =

Unincorporated community in West Virginia, United States

Cameo
- Unincorporated community
- Location within the state of West Virginia Cameo (the United States)
- Coordinates: 38°6′41″N 81°55′52″W
- Country: United States
- State: West Virginia
- County: Boone
- Elevation: 892 ft (272 m)
- Time zone: UTC-5 (Eastern (EST))
  - Summer (DST): UTC-4 (EDT)
- GNIS ID: 1536881

Cameo is an unincorporated community and coal town in Boone County, West Virginia, United States.
