= Barrett, West Virginia =

Unincorporated community in West Virginia, United States

Barrett
- Unincorporated community
- Location within the state of West Virginia Barrett (the United States)
- Coordinates: 37°53′14″N 81°40′12″W
- Country: United States
- State: West Virginia
- County: Boone
- Time zone: UTC-5 (Eastern (EST))
  - Summer (DST): UTC-4 (EDT)

Barrett is a small unincorporated community and coal town with a population of 781 in Boone County in the U.S. state of West Virginia. Barrett lies along the Pond Fork River. Barrett was named for Charles Barrett of Madison, who was an employee of the Cole & Crane Lumber Company, which had a mill there.
