= Manila, West Virginia =

Manila
- Unincorporated community
- Location within the state of West Virginia Manila (the United States)
- Coordinates: 37°59′12″N 81°56′34″W
- Country: United States
- State: West Virginia
- County: Boone
- Time zone: UTC-5 (Eastern (EST))
  - Summer (DST): UTC-4 (EDT)
- GNIS feature ID: 1555036

Manila is a small unincorporated community in Boone County, West Virginia, United States. Like other American settlements named for the Philippine capital, the town was so named circa 1900, during the Spanish–American War, to commemorate the United States' naval victory at the 1898 Battle of Manila Bay.

Its fourth class post office was discontinued on February 28, 1969.
