= Secoal, West Virginia =

Secoal
- Unincorporated community
- Location within the state of West Virginia Secoal (the United States)
- Coordinates: 37°58′46″N 81°48′29″W
- Country: United States
- State: West Virginia
- County: Boone
- Elevation: 758 ft (231 m)
- Time zone: UTC-5 (Eastern (EST))
  - Summer (DST): UTC-4 (EDT)
- GNIS ID: 1546539

Secoal is an unincorporated community and coal town in Boone County, West Virginia.
