= Pondco, West Virginia =

Pondco
- Unincorporated community
- Location within the state of West Virginia Pondco (the United States)
- Coordinates: 37°53′53″N 81°40′18″W
- Country: United States
- State: West Virginia
- County: Boone
- Elevation: 965 ft (294 m)
- Time zone: UTC-5 (Eastern (EST))
  - Summer (DST): UTC-4 (EDT)
- GNIS ID: 1545135

Pondco is an unincorporated community in Boone County, West Virginia, United States.
