= Milltown, West Virginia =

Milltown
- Unincorporated community
- Location within the state of West Virginia Milltown (the United States)
- Coordinates: 38°2′41″N 81°37′2″W
- Country: United States
- State: West Virginia
- County: Boone
- Elevation: 856 ft (261 m)
- Time zone: UTC-5 (Eastern (EST))
  - Summer (DST): UTC-4 (EDT)
- GNIS ID: 1555129

Milltown is an unincorporated community in Boone County, West Virginia, United States.
