= Nelson, West Virginia =

Nelson
- Unincorporated community
- Location within the state of West Virginia Nelson (the United States)
- Coordinates: 38°4′8″N 81°37′21″W
- Country: United States
- State: West Virginia
- County: Boone
- Elevation: 768 ft (234 m)
- Time zone: UTC-5 (Eastern (EST))
  - Summer (DST): UTC-4 (EDT)
- GNIS ID: 1555197

Nelson is an unincorporated community in Boone County, West Virginia, United States. Its post office has been closed.
