= Blue Pennant, West Virginia =

Unincorporated community in West Virginia, United States

Blue Pennant
- Unincorporated community
- Location within the state of West Virginia Blue Pennant (the United States)
- Coordinates: 37°58′15″N 81°33′34″W
- Country: United States
- State: West Virginia
- County: Boone
- Elevation: 1,040 ft (320 m)
- Time zone: UTC-5 (Eastern (EST))
  - Summer (DST): UTC-4 (EDT)
- GNIS ID: 1553933

Blue Pennant is an unincorporated community in Boone County, West Virginia, United States. At one time, it was known as Red Dragon,.

The community most likely was named after the local Blue Pennant coal company.
