= Coopertown, West Virginia =

Unincorporated community in West Virginia, United States

Coopertown
- Unincorporated community
- Location within the state of West Virginia Coopertown (the United States)
- Coordinates: 38°4′41″N 81°35′23″W
- Country: United States
- State: West Virginia
- County: Boone
- Elevation: 718 ft (219 m)
- Time zone: UTC-5 (Eastern (EST))
  - Summer (DST): UTC-4 (EDT)
- GNIS ID: 1554188

Coopertown is an unincorporated community in Boone County, West Virginia, United States.
