= Sharlow, West Virginia =

Sharlow
- Unincorporated community
- Location within the state of West Virginia Sharlow (the United States)
- Coordinates: 38°7′57″N 81°38′3″W
- Country: United States
- State: West Virginia
- County: Boone
- Elevation: 689 ft (210 m)
- Time zone: UTC-5 (Eastern (EST))
  - Summer (DST): UTC-4 (EDT)
- GNIS ID: 1549924

Sharlow is an unincorporated community and coal town in Boone County, West Virginia, United States.
