= Drawdy Creek =

Stream in West Virginia, U.S.

Coordinates: 38.119010°N 81.704826°W

Drawdy Creek is a stream in the U.S. state of West Virginia.

Drawdy Creek most likely was named after William Drowdy, a pioneer county coroner.

== See also ==
- List of rivers of West Virginia
