= Fosterville, West Virginia =

Unincorporated community in West Virginia, United States

Fosterville
- Unincorporated community
- Location within the state of West Virginia Fosterville (the United States)
- Coordinates: 38°5′31″N 81°36′14″W
- Country: United States
- State: West Virginia
- County: Boone
- Elevation: 705 ft (215 m)
- Time zone: UTC-5 (Eastern (EST))
  - Summer (DST): UTC-4 (EDT)
- GNIS ID: 1539170

Fosterville is an unincorporated community in Boone County, West Virginia, United States.
