= Fosterville, Victoria =

Fosterville
- Suburb
- Interactive map of Fosterville
- Coordinates: 36°41′49″S 144°29′56″E
- Country: Australia
- State: Victoria
- City: Bendigo
- LGA: City of Greater Bendigo
- Established: 1852

Government
  - State electorate: Bendigo East
  - Federal division: Bendigo

Population
  - Total: 57 (2021 census)
- Postcode: 3557

Fosterville is a locality in the City of Greater Bendigo in the Australian state of Victoria. The nearby Fosterville mine is one of Australia's most productive gold mines, operated by Canada's Agnico Eagle.

== History ==
It was founded in 1852 as Ellesmere when gold was discovered. In 1894 it was renamed Fosterville after Henry Foster, the Minister for Mines. A school was opened in 1898 and closed in 1953.
