= Coal Valley, West Virginia =

Unincorporated community in West Virginia, United States

- Unincorporated community
- Location within West Virginia Location within the United States
- Coordinates: 37°56′29″N 81°48′58″W
- Country: United States
- State: West Virginia
- County: Logan
- Elevation: 814 ft (248 m)
- Time zone: UTC-5 (Eastern (EST))
  - Summer (DST): UTC-4 (EDT)
- GNIS ID: 1537472

Coal Valley is an unincorporated community in Logan County, West Virginia, United States.

It is in the Logan Coalfield region.
