= Low Gap, West Virginia =

Low Gap
- Unincorporated community
- Location within the state of West Virginia Low Gap (the United States)
- Coordinates: 38°1′53″N 81°50′8″W
- Country: United States
- State: West Virginia
- County: Boone
- Elevation: 745 ft (227 m)
- Time zone: UTC-5 (Eastern (EST))
  - Summer (DST): UTC-4 (EDT)
- GNIS ID: 1542497

Low Gap is an unincorporated community in Boone County, West Virginia, United States.

The community was named for a low mountain pass near the original town site.
