= Karen Sharlow =

Canadian Federal Court of Appeal

Personal details
- Spouse: Steve Sharlow
- Education: Simon Fraser University; University of British Columbia

Karen Sharlow is a former judge of the Canadian Federal Court of Appeal. She served as the Acting Chief Justice for the Federal Court of Appeal from June to September, 2014.

== Life ==
Sharlow graduated from Simon Fraser University in 1979 with her BA in Commerce and Economics.
