= Lanta, West Virginia =

Lanta
- Unincorporated community
- Location within the state of West Virginia Lanta (the United States)
- Coordinates: 37°59′32″N 81°44′12″W
- Country: United States
- State: West Virginia
- County: Boone
- Elevation: 817 ft (249 m)
- Time zone: UTC-5 (Eastern (EST))
  - Summer (DST): UTC-4 (EDT)
- GNIS ID: 1554911

Lanta is an unincorporated community in Boone County, West Virginia, United States.
