= Ashford, West Virginia =

Unincorporated community in West Virginia, United States

Ashford
- Unincorporated community
- Location within the state of West Virginia Ashford (the United States)
- Coordinates: 38°10′45″N 81°42′39″W
- Country: United States
- State: West Virginia
- County: Boone
- Time zone: UTC-5 (Eastern (EST))
  - Summer (DST): UTC-4 (EDT)

Ashford is an unincorporated community and once-active coal town in Boone County, West Virginia, United States. Ashford was established as a coal camp and grew into a thriving mining community.

== History ==
It was established by the Crawford and Ashby land company. A former mining town, Ashford includes all of the communities in the 25009 zip code from the top of Lens Creek Mountain to the bridge crossing Coal River, up the river (south) toward Costa and down the river (north) to Emmons and Lower White Oak. Rumble was a separate coal camp located within the area known as Ashford, but never had its own post office although there was an elementary school there that burned around 1960. What was known as Rumble starts near Casey Fork Hollow and continues along County Route 1 to just past the new Ashford-Rumble School. From the Ashford bridge you can travel to Lower White Oak and Emmons (on the Boone County side) and to Dartmont (on the opposite side). Ashford Hill Road follows the east side of Big Coal River and is also considered part of Ashford. Ashford Hill Road ends at Brier Branch.

The Ashford post office was destroyed by fire in 2005, and was never reopened. In August 2008, the brand new Ashford bridge opened to the public. The new bridge was named as a memorial to Willis W. Elkins, a United States Navy submarine crewman and long-time educator who was born about 100 yards from where the new bridge stands. The original bridge, constructed in 1923, was demolished on August 26, 2008.

One of the locks of the old navigation system was located in Ashford where Lower White Oak Creek enters Big Coal River. This system of locks allowed steamboats to travel up the Big Coal River as far as Peytona. The heyday of the navigation system was in the 1850s. The Civil War interrupted traffic. Soon after the War the system was repaired, but was often rendered unusable due to floods. The coming of the C & O railroad signaled the end of the river transportation system, but remnants of some of the locks can still be seen during low water periods.

== Education ==
There is one school in Ashford: Ashford-Rumble Elementary School.

== Notable people ==
- Josh Holstein, member of the West Virginia House of Delegates
