= Boone County Courthouse (West Virginia) =

- U.S. National Register of Historic Places
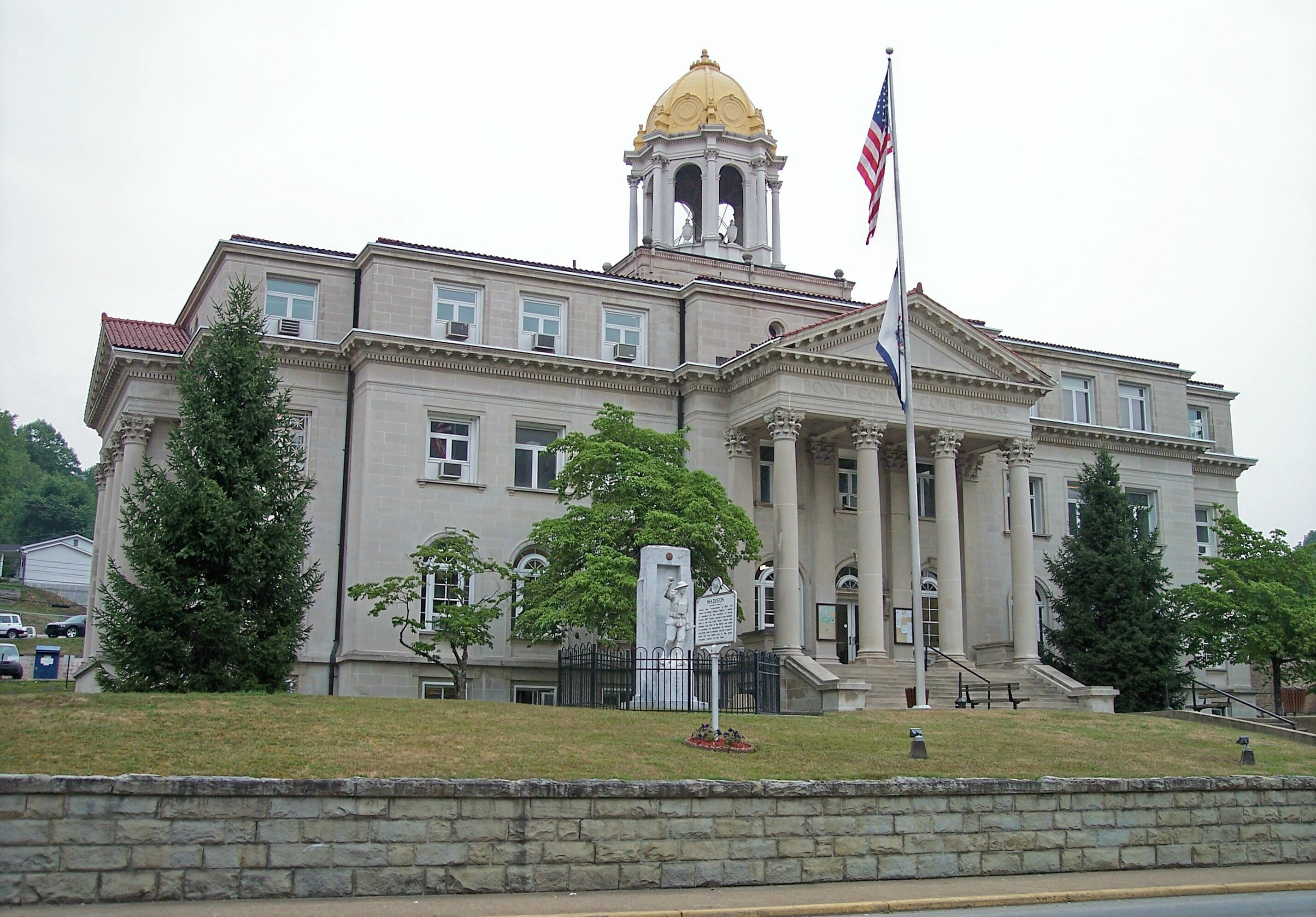

- Location within West Virginia Location within the United States
- Interactive map showing the location of Boone County Courthouse
- Location: State St., Madison, West Virginia
- Coordinates: 38°3′59″N 81°49′8″W
- Built: 1917
- Architect: Warne, H. Rus
- Architectural style: Renaissance, Neo-Classical Revival
- NRHP reference No.: 81000596
- Added to NRHP: April 9, 1981

The Boone County Courthouse in Madison, West Virginia was completed in 1921 in the Neoclassical Revival style. Designed by architect H. Rus Warne of Charleston, the courthouse stands on a small hill in a square. Construction started in 1917, but disputes and construction delays extended construction for four years. Its dome was gold-leafed in 1977.

It was listed on the National Register of Historic Places in 1981.
