= Hewett Creek =

Stream in West Virginia, U.S.

Coordinates: 37°58′12″N 81°49′23″W

Hewett Creek is a stream in the U.S. state of West Virginia.

Hewett Creek was named after Richard Hewett, a local pioneer settler who was killed by Indians near the creek's banks.

== See also ==
- List of rivers of West Virginia
