= Garrison, West Virginia =

Unincorporated community in West Virginia, United States

- Unincorporated community
- Location within West Virginia Location within the United States
- Coordinates: 37°59′46″N 81°30′24″W
- Country: United States
- State: West Virginia
- County: Boone
- Elevation: 1,053 ft (321 m)
- Time zone: UTC-5 (Eastern (EST))
  - Summer (DST): UTC-4 (EDT)
- Area codes: 304 & 681
- GNIS feature ID: 1554533

Garrison is an unincorporated community and coal town in Boone County, West Virginia, United States. Garrison is 3 miles (4.8 km) east-southeast of Sylvester. Garrison had a post office, which closed on March 30, 1989.
