= Elk Run Junction, West Virginia =

Unincorporated community in West Virginia, United States

Elk Run Junction
- Unincorporated community
- Location within the state of West Virginia Elk Run Junction (the United States)
- Coordinates: 37°59′31″N 81°32′34″W
- Country: United States
- State: West Virginia
- County: Boone
- Elevation: 801 ft (244 m)
- Time zone: UTC-5 (Eastern (EST))
  - Summer (DST): UTC-4 (EDT)
- GNIS ID: 1538638

Elk Run Junction is an unincorporated community in Boone County, West Virginia, United States.

== Climate ==
The climate in this area is characterized by hot, humid summers and generally mild to cool winters. According to the Köppen Climate Classification system, Elk Run Junction has a humid subtropical climate, abbreviated "Cfa" on climate maps.
