= Janie, West Virginia =

Janie
- Unincorporated community
- Location within the state of West Virginia Janie (the United States)
- Coordinates: 37°58′56″N 81°32′18″W
- Country: United States
- State: West Virginia
- County: Boone
- Elevation: 833 ft (254 m)
- Time zone: UTC-5 (Eastern (EST))
  - Summer (DST): UTC-4 (EDT)
- GNIS ID: 1554796

Janie is an unincorporated community and former coal town known as Mordue in Boone County, West Virginia, United States.
