= Marthatown, West Virginia =

Marthatown
- Unincorporated community
- Location within the state of West Virginia Marthatown (the United States)
- Coordinates: 37°56′4″N 81°41′51″W
- Country: United States
- State: West Virginia
- County: Boone
- Elevation: 883 ft (269 m)
- Time zone: UTC-5 (Eastern (EST))
  - Summer (DST): UTC-4 (EDT)
- GNIS ID: 1555058

Marthatown is an unincorporated community in Boone County, West Virginia, United States. At one time it was also known as Kelcol.
