= Grippe, West Virginia =

- Unincorporated community
- Location within West Virginia and the United States Grippe (the United States)
- Coordinates: 38°11′56″N 81°44′10″W
- Country: United States
- State: West Virginia
- County: Kanawha
- Elevation: 663 ft (202 m)
- Time zone: UTC-5 (Eastern (EST))
  - Summer (DST): UTC-4 (EDT)
- GNIS ID: 1554617

Grippe is an unincorporated community and coal town in Kanawha County, West Virginia, United States.
