= Maxine, West Virginia =

Maxine
- Unincorporated community
- Location within the state of West Virginia Maxine (the United States)
- Coordinates: 38°7′57″N 81°37′19″W
- Country: United States
- State: West Virginia
- County: Boone
- Elevation: 686 ft (209 m)
- Time zone: UTC-5 (Eastern (EST))
  - Summer (DST): UTC-4 (EDT)
- GNIS ID: 1555068

Maxine is an unincorporated community in Boone County, West Virginia, United States.
