= West Virginia Route 85 =

State highway in West Virginia, United States

West Virginia Route 85

Route information
- Maintained by WVDOH
- Length: 45.1 mi (72.6 km)

Major junctions
- South end: WV 10 in Oceana
- WV 99 near Kopperston
- North end: US 119 near Danville

Location
- Country: United States
- State: West Virginia
- Counties: Wyoming, Boone

Highway system
- West Virginia State Highway System; Interstate; US; State
← WV 84	→ WV 86

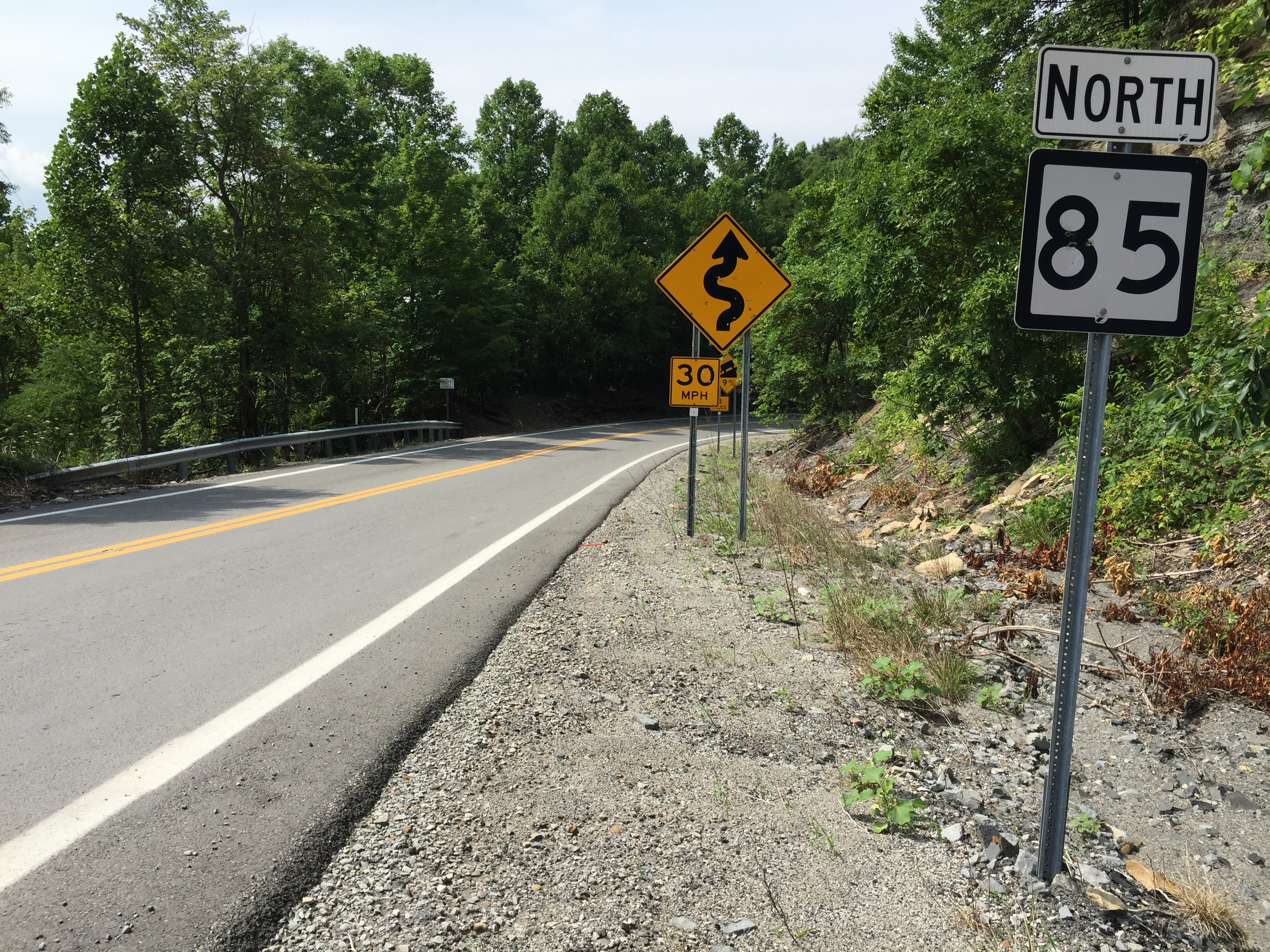
View north along WV 85 at WV 99 in southeastern Boone County

West Virginia Route 85 is a north–south state highway in southern West Virginia. The southern terminus of the route is at West Virginia Route 10 in Oceana. The northern terminus is at U.S. Route 119 northwest of Danville.

== Major intersections ==
County	Location	mi	km	Destinations	Notes
Wyoming	Oceana			WV 10	
Boone				WV 99 east – Beckley	
Boone	Madison			WV 17 south – Logan	
Boone				US 119 – Charleston, Logan	
1.000 mi = 1.609 km; 1.000 km = 0.621 mi
