= Charleston metropolitan area, West Virginia =

Coordinates: 38°20′N 81°35′W

Charleston Metropolitan Area
- Metropolitan Statistical Area
- Charleston–Huntington–Ashland, WV–OH–KY
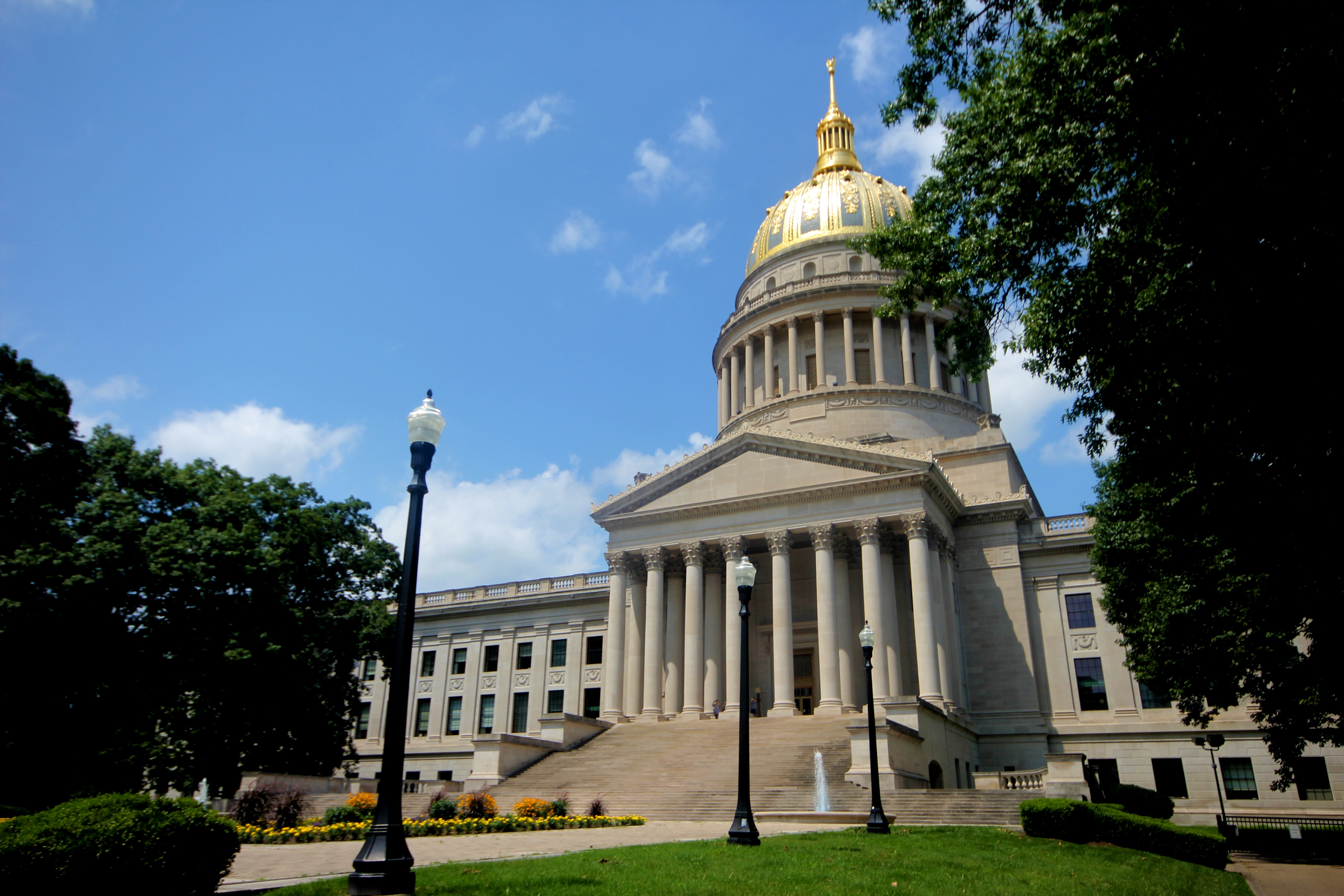
- West Virginia State Capitol
Charleston–Huntington–Ashland, WV–OH–KY CSA
Charleston, WV MSA
Huntington–Ashland, WV–KY–OH MSA
Portsmouth, OH µSA
City of Charleston
City of Huntington
City of Ashland
- Country: United States
- State: West Virginia; Kentucky; Ohio
- Largest city: Charleston
- Other cities: Huntington; Ashland; Portsmouth; Ironton; South Charleston; St. Albans; Dunbar

Area
  - Total: 2,159.9 sq mi (5,594 km^{2})
- Highest elevation: 1,512 ft (461 m)
- Lowest elevation: 486 ft (148 m)

Population (2015 est.)
  - Total: 361,580
  - Rank: 146th in the U.S.
  - Density: 167/sq mi (64.6/km^{2})
- Time zone: UTC−5 (EST)
  - Summer (DST): UTC−4 (EDT)

The Charleston Metropolitan Statistical Area, as defined by the United States Census Bureau, is an area consisting of three counties in the US state of West Virginia, anchored by the city of Charleston. It is the second largest metropolitan area in the state, after the Huntington metropolitan area, and the largest metropolitan area completely within the state.

Charleston is the most populous city in the MSA and Cross Lanes is its most populous census-designated place. As of the 2020 US census, the Charleston MSA had a population of 209,967, down from 227,078 at the 2010 US census. The Charleston-Huntington-Ashland, WV, OH, KY Combined Statistical Area (CSA) had a population of 660,754 according to the 2020 US census. Prior to the 2000 US census, the Charleston MSA consisted of two counties; Kanawha and Putnam. In February 2013, Putnam County officially became part of the Huntington MSA, and the Charleston MSA consists of Kanawha County, Boone County, and Clay County.

== Rankings ==
The population of the Charleston Metropolitan Area (MSA) is ranked 151st out of MSA populations in the United States.

- The Charleston–Huntington, WV-OH-KY Combined Metropolitan Area (CSA) is the 81st largest in the country.
- The Charleston-Huntington TV Market is ranked the 64th largest.
- The Charleston MSA is the 181st largest out of the 297 Arbitron radio markets.
- Out of 280 metropolitan statistical areas ranked by per capita income, the Charleston MSA is ranked 106th. (Census 2000)
- The MSA is ranked 202 by median household income. (Census 2000)

== Counties ==
| County | Seat | 2025 estimate | 2020 census | Change | Area | Density |
|---|---|---|---|---|---|---|
| Kanawha | Charleston | 172,381 | 180,745 | −4.63% | 911 sq mi (2,360 km^{2}) | 189/sq mi (73/km^{2}) |
| Boone | Madison | 20,251 | 21,809 | −7.14% | 503 sq mi (1,300 km^{2}) | 40/sq mi (16/km^{2}) |
| Clay | Clay | 7,538 | 8,051 | −6.37% | 344 sq mi (890 km^{2}) | 22/sq mi (8/km^{2}) |
| Total | | 200,170 | 210,605 | −4.95% | 1,758 sq mi (4,550 km^{2}) | 114/sq mi (44/km^{2}) |

== Cities, towns, and other communities ==
=== Places with more than 45,000 inhabitants ===
- Charleston (Principal City)

=== Places with 5,000 to 15,000 inhabitants ===
- Cross Lanes (census-designated place)
- Dunbar
- Nitro (partial)
- South Charleston
- St. Albans

=== Places with 1,000 to 5,000 inhabitants ===
- Alum Creek (census-designated place)
- Belle
- Chesapeake
- Clendenin
- Coal Fork (census-designated place)
- Culloden (census-designated place; partial)
- Elkview (census-designated place)
- Madison
- Marmet
- Montgomery (partial)
- Pinch (census-designated place)
- Sissonville (census-designated place)
- Upper Falls (census-designated place)

=== Places with less than 1,000 inhabitants ===
- Cedar Grove
- Clay
- Danville
- East Bank
- Glasgow
- Handley
- Jefferson
- Pratt
- Smithers (partial)
- Sylvester
- Whitesville

=== Unincorporated places ===
- Adonijah
- Ashford
- Bandytown
- Barrett
- Big Chimney
- Bim
- Bob White
- Bream
- Crede
- Dille
- Elk Forest
- Emmons
- Floe
- Foch
- Hillsdale
- Independence
- Institute
- Julian
- Little Italy
- Mink Shoals
- Nellis
- O'Brion
- Porter
- Racine
- Rand
- Swandale
- Uneeda
- Valley Fork
- Van
- Washington Heights
- Wharton
- Whetstone
- Widen

== Demographics ==
As of the census of 2000, there were 309,635 people, 129,229 households, and 88,175 families residing within the MSA. New definitions from February 28, 2013, placed the population at 363,000. The racial makeup of the MSA was 93.25% White, 4.66% African American, 0.21% Native American, 0.65% Asian, 0.02% Pacific Islander, 0.17% from other races, and 1.04% from two or more races. Hispanics or Latinos of any race were 0.55% of the population.

The median income for a household in the MSA was $29,222, and the median income for a family was $35,735. Males had a median income of $34,105 versus $20,448 for females. The per capita income for the MSA was $16,074.

== Highways ==
=== Interstates ===
- Interstate 77
- Interstate 79
- Interstate 64

=== U.S. Highways ===
- U.S. Route 60
- U.S. Route 119
- U.S. Route 35

=== Appalachian Corridors ===
- Corridor G

=== WV state highways ===
- West Virginia Route 61
- West Virginia Route 622
- West Virginia Route 94
- West Virginia Route 4
- West Virginia Route 62
- West Virginia Route 16
- West Virginia Route 34
- West Virginia Route 3
- West Virginia Route 25
- West Virginia Route 10
- West Virginia Route 36
- West Virginia Route 114
- West Virginia Route 601
- West Virginia Route 214
- West Virginia Route 501
- West Virginia Route 869
- West Virginia Route 817

== Colleges and universities ==
- University of Charleston
- West Virginia State University
- Marshall University Graduate College
- BridgeValley Community and Technical College
- WV Junior College

== Combined Statistical Area ==
The Charleston–Huntington–Ashland, WV-OH-KY Combined Statistical Area consists of the Charleston, WV Metropolitan Statistical Area, the Huntington–Ashland, WV-KY-OH Metropolitan Statistical Area, and the Portsmouth, OH Micropolitan Statistical Area. It spans 12 counties in West Virginia, Kentucky, and Ohio.

| CBSA | 2023 Population (est.) | County | 2023 Population (est.) | 2020 Population | 2010 Population | 2000 Population | 1950 Population | 1900 Population |
|---|---|---|---|---|---|---|---|---|
| Huntington–Ashland, WV–KY–OH MSA | 368,261 | Cabell County, West Virginia | 92,082 | 94,350 | 96,319 | 96,784 | 108,035 | 29,252 |
| Huntington–Ashland, WV–KY–OH MSA | 368,261 | Putnam County, West Virginia | 56,962 | 57,440 | 55,486 | 51,589 | 21,021 | 17,330 |
| Huntington–Ashland, WV–KY–OH MSA | 368,261 | Lawrence County, Ohio | 56,118 | 58,240 | 62,450 | 62,319 | 49,115 | 39,354 |
| Huntington–Ashland, WV–KY–OH MSA | 368,261 | Boyd County, Kentucky | 47,826 | 48,261 | 49,542 | 49,752 | 49,949 | 18,834 |
| Huntington–Ashland, WV–KY–OH MSA | 368,261 | Wayne County, West Virginia | 37,686 | 38,982 | 42,481 | 42,903 | 38,696 | 23,619 |
| Huntington–Ashland, WV–KY–OH MSA | 368,261 | Greenup County, Kentucky | 35,221 | 35,962 | 36,910 | 36,891 | 24,887 | 15,432 |
| Huntington–Ashland, WV–KY–OH MSA | 368,261 | Carter County, Kentucky | 26,366 | 26,627 | 27,720 | 26,889 | 22,559 | 20,228 |
| Huntington–Ashland, WV–KY–OH MSA | 368,261 | Lawrence County, Kentucky | 16,000 | 16,293 | 15,860 | 15,569 | 14,418 | 19,612 |
| Charleston, WV MSA | 203,164 | Kanawha County, West Virginia | 174,805 | 180,745 | 193,063 | 200,073 | 239,629 | 54,696 |
| Charleston, WV MSA | 203,164 | Boone County, West Virginia | 20,576 | 21,809 | 24,629 | 25,535 | 33,173 | 8,194 |
| Charleston, WV MSA | 203,164 | Clay County, West Virginia | 7,783 | 8,051 | 9,386 | 10,330 | 14,961 | 8,248 |
| Portsmouth, OH μSA | 71,969 | Scioto County, Ohio | 71,969 | 74,008 | 79,499 | 79,195 | 82,910 | 40,981 |
| Charleston–Huntington–Ashland, WV–OH–KY CSA | 643,394 | | | | | | | |
