= WTUB =

WTUB may refer to:

- WTUB-LP, a low-power radio station (106.7 FM) licensed to serve Lizemores, West Virginia, United States
- WQVD, a radio station (700 AM) licensed to serve Orange-Athol, Massachusetts, United States, which held the call sign WTUB from 2009 to 2014
- WYAY (FM), a radio station (93.7 FM) licensed to serve Georgetown, South Carolina, United States, which held the call sign WTUB from 1989 to 1992
