= Dille =

Dille is a surname. Notable people with the surname include:

- A. B. Dille, American football and basketball player and coach
- Bob Dille (1917–1998), American basketball player and coach
- Flint Dille (born 1955), American screenwriter and video game designer
- Steve Dille (1945–2020), American veterinarian and politician
- Willie Dille (1965–2018), Dutch politician

== See also ==
- Dille, West Virginia, unincorporated community
- Ad-Dilli, older name of this Syrian town
