= Bickmore, West Virginia =

Unincorporated community in West Virginia, United States

- Unincorporated community
- Location within West Virginia Location within the United States
- Coordinates: 38°22′53″N 81°06′43″W
- Country: United States
- State: West Virginia
- County: Clay
- Elevation: 948 ft (289 m)
- Time zone: UTC-5 (Eastern (EST))
  - Summer (DST): UTC-4 (EDT)
- ZIP code: 25019
- Area codes: 304 & 681
- GNIS feature ID: 1535764

Bickmore is an unincorporated community and coal town in Clay County, West Virginia, United States. Bickmore is located on West Virginia Route 16, 5.5 miles (8.9 km) south-southwest of Clay. Bickmore has a post office with ZIP code 25019.
