= Two Run =

Two Run may refer to:

- Two Run, Clay County, West Virginia
- Two Run, Wirt County, West Virginia
