= Harrison, Clay County, West Virginia =

Harrison, West Virginia
- Unincorporated community
- Location within West Virginia Location within the United States
- Coordinates: 38°30′46″N 80°57′12″W
- Country: United States
- State: West Virginia
- County: Clay
- Elevation: 1,076 ft (328 m)
- Time zone: UTC-5 (Eastern (EST))
  - Summer (DST): UTC-4 (EDT)
- Area codes: 304 & 681
- GNIS feature ID: 1549730

Harrison is an unincorporated community in Clay County, West Virginia, United States. Harrison is 8 miles (13 km) northeast of Clay.
