= End of the World Turn =

Cliff structure in Clay County, West Virginia

Coordinates: 38.541613°N 80.964966°W

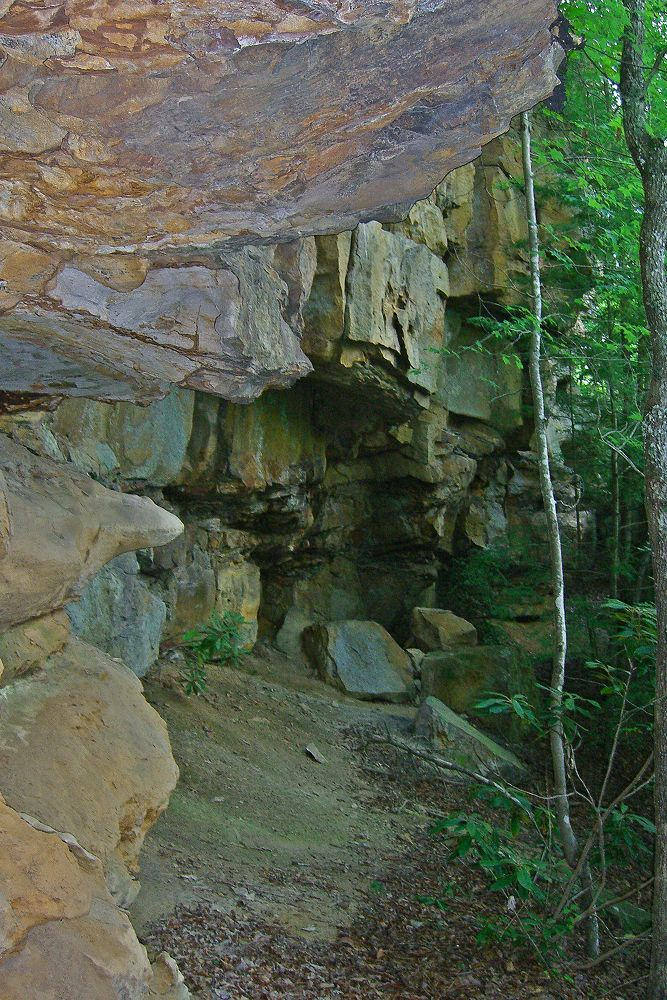
The bluff at the downstream end of the End of the World Turn. Here, the cliffs rise over 400 feet above the Elk River and are not accessible by vehicle.

The End of the World Turn (also "End of the World Curve" or simply "End of the World") is a cliff structure which rises approximately 1,100 feet above sea level at a bend of the Elk River (West Virginia), 5.6 miles above Ivydale, Clay County, West Virginia.

In W.E.R. Byrne's book, "Tale of the Elk", he explains how the name came about:

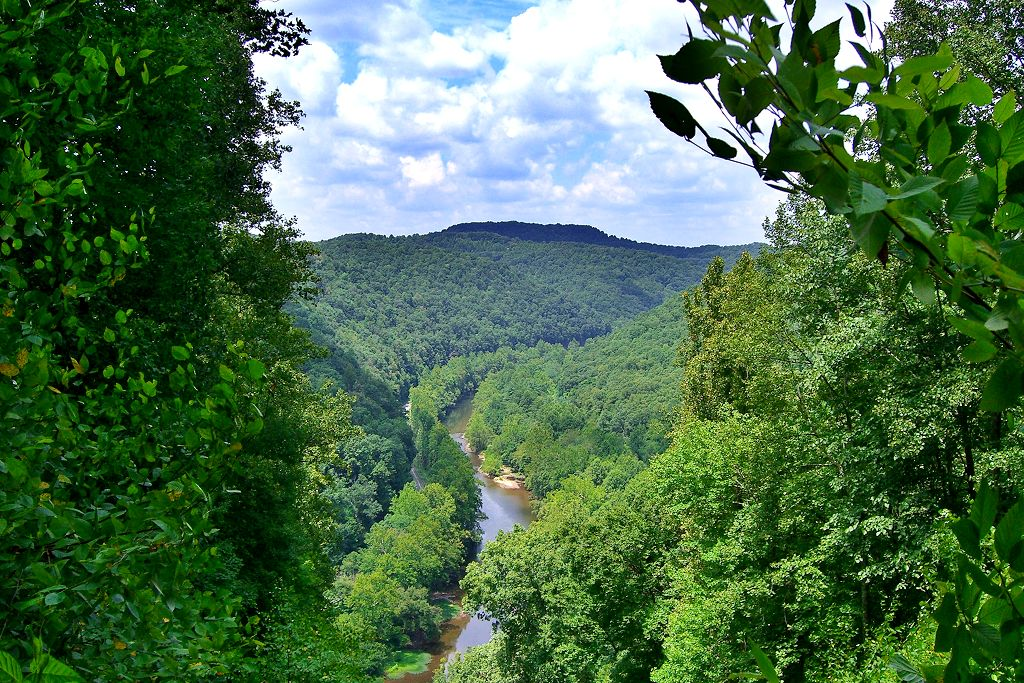
View from atop the cliffs

"The Elk river, seventy miles above its mouth at Charleston, in that wildly picturesque portion of central West Virginia, makes an abrupt bend in its course, where the waters, now with impetuous rush, now in placid pool, are baffled and turned to the right in a graceful semi-circular sweep of almost a mile, by beetling cliffs rising sheer from the river level, to an elevation of several hundred feet. These cliffs and their huge rocks, which, in the ages, have fallen away and found lodgment in and along the side of the stream, to the pioneer raftsman, as his craft swept into the curve from upriver, gave the distinct impression of having reached an insuperable barrier to his further progress - a cul-de-sac, or the jumping-off place; hence from the earliest history of the country, that locality has been called, and still bears the name - 'The End of the World'."
