= Big Otter, West Virginia =

Unincorporated community in West Virginia, United States

- Unincorporated community
- Location within West Virginia Location within the United States
- Coordinates: 38°35′58″N 81°03′06″W
- Country: United States
- State: West Virginia
- County: Clay
- Elevation: 873 ft (266 m)
- Time zone: UTC-5 (Eastern (EST))
  - Summer (DST): UTC-4 (EDT)
- ZIP code: 25113
- Area codes: 304 & 681
- GNIS feature ID: 1535890

Big Otter is an unincorporated community in Clay County, West Virginia, United States. Big Otter is located on Big Otter Creek at the junction of Interstate 79 and West Virginia Route 16. The community is 9.5 miles (15.3 km) north-northeast of Clay, the county seat of Clay County. Big Otter is part of ZIP code 25113. Its original post office with a zip code of 25020 closed in 1979.
