= Glen, West Virginia =

Unincorporated community in West Virginia, United States

- Unincorporated community
- Location within West Virginia Location within the United States
- Coordinates: 38°23′39″N 81°14′33″W
- Country: United States
- State: West Virginia
- County: Clay
- Elevation: 1,007 ft (307 m)
- Time zone: UTC-5 (Eastern (EST))
  - Summer (DST): UTC-4 (EDT)
- ZIP code: 25088
- Area codes: 304 & 681
- GNIS feature ID: 1549706

Glen is an unincorporated community in Clay County, West Virginia, United States. Glen is 10 miles (16 km) southwest of Clay. Glen has a post office with ZIP code 25088.
