= Eakle =

Eakle may refer to:

- Eakle, West Virginia, a community in Clay County, West Virginia
- Charlie Eakle, an American former baseball second baseman
- Matt Eakle, a jazz flutist
