= Bomont, West Virginia =

Unincorporated community in West Virginia, United States

- Unincorporated community
- Nickname: Pleasant Retreat
- Location within West Virginia Location within the United States
- Coordinates: 38°26′59″N 81°13′56″W
- Country: United States
- State: West Virginia
- County: Clay
- Elevation: 830 ft (250 m)
- Time zone: UTC−5 (Eastern (EST))
  - Summer (DST): UTC−4 (EDT)
- ZIP Code: 25030
- Area codes: 304 & 681
- GNIS feature ID: 1549602

Bomont is an unincorporated community in Clay County, West Virginia, United States. Bomont is 8 miles (13 km) west of Clay. Bomont had a post office with ZIP Code 25030, which closed in 2011.

The Golden Delicious originated in an orchard at Bomont.

Bomont was first named Pleasant Retreat, but the name was later changed to Bomont.
