= Kangaroo court =

Court with little or no judicial credibility

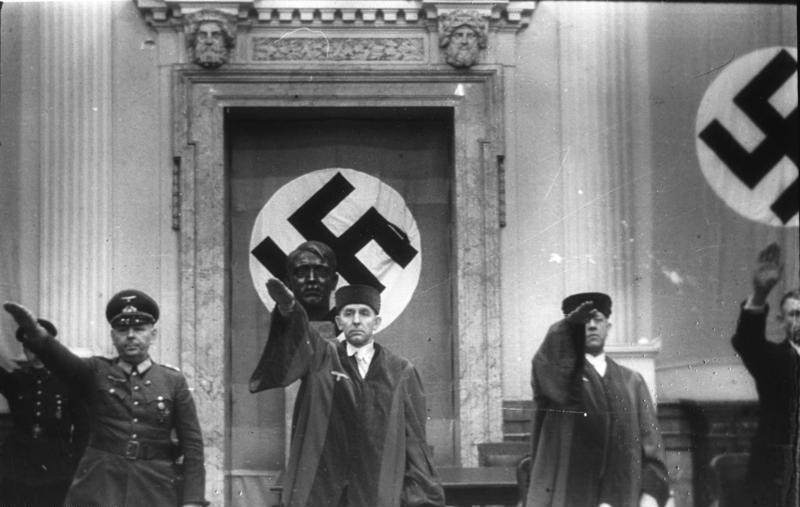
A session of the People's Court in Nazi Germany, a kangaroo court that conducted show trials of political enemies

Kangaroo court is an informal pejorative term for a court that ignores recognized standards of law or justice, carries little or no official standing in the territory within which it resides, and is typically convened ad hoc. A kangaroo court may ignore due process and come to a predetermined conclusion. The term is also used for a court held by a legitimate judicial authority, but which intentionally or structurally disregards the court's legal or ethical obligations (compare show trial).

== Etymology ==
The term is known to have been used in the United States in 1841: an article in The Daily Picayune, New Orleans quotes the Concordia Intelligencer reporting several lynchings "upon various charges instituted by the Kangaroo court", asking "Don't comprehend: What is a Kangaroo court?" The term is not attested in Australia, native land of the kangaroo, or elsewhere before then.

The derivation of the term is not known, though there has been speculation. One suggestion is that, as these courts are often convened quickly to deal with an immediate issue, they are called kangaroo courts since they have "jumped up" out of nowhere, like a kangaroo. Another possibility is that the phrase could refer to the pouch of a kangaroo, meaning the court is in someone's pocket. Some sources suggest that the term may have been popularized during the California Gold Rush of 1849 to which many thousands of Australians flocked. In consequence of the Australian miners' presence, it may have come about as a description of the hastily carried-out proceedings used to deal with the issue of claim-jumping miners.

Etymologist Philologos suggests that the term arose "because a place named Kangaroo sounded comical to its hearers, just as place names like Kalamazoo, and Booger Hole, and Okeefenokee Swamp, strike us as comical." In 19th-century United States, an alternative term was "mustang" court, after horses that roamed the plains, thus evoking the image of a court presided over by a wild beast. In 2005 the term is still in common use in the Anglosphere.

== As informal proceedings in sport ==
The term is sometimes used without any negative connotation. For example, many Major League Baseball and Minor League Baseball teams have a kangaroo court to punish players for errors on the field, being late for a game or practice, not wearing proper attire to road games, or having a messy locker in the clubhouse. Fines are allotted, and at the end of the year the money collected is given to charity or used for a team party at the end of the season.

== See also ==
- Basmanny justice
- Drumhead court-martial
