= Fola, West Virginia =

Unincorporated community in West Virginia, US

- Unincorporated community
- Location within West Virginia Location within the United States
- Coordinates: 38°21′27″N 81°06′13″W
- Country: United States
- State: West Virginia
- County: Clay
- Elevation: 1,102 ft (336 m)
- Time zone: UTC-5 (Eastern (EST))
  - Summer (DST): UTC-4 (EDT)
- ZIP codes: 25080
- Area codes: 304 & 681
- GNIS feature ID: 1539110

Fola is an unincorporated community in Clay County, West Virginia, United States. Fola is 7.5 miles (12.1 km) south of Clay.
