= Procious, West Virginia =

- Unincorporated community
- Location within West Virginia Location within the United States
- Coordinates: 38°29′44″N 81°12′27″W
- Country: United States
- State: West Virginia
- County: Clay
- Elevation: 650 ft (200 m)
- Time zone: UTC-5 (Eastern (EST))
  - Summer (DST): UTC-4 (EDT)
- ZIP code: 25164
- Area codes: 304 & 681
- GNIS feature ID: 1555416

Procious is an unincorporated community in Clay County, West Virginia, United States. Procious is located on the Elk River and West Virginia Route 4, 7 miles (11 km) west-northwest of Clay. Procious has a post office with ZIP code 25164.

Adam Procious, an early postmaster, gave the community his name.

The community was left in ruins by the 2016 West Virginia flood.

== Climate ==
The climate in this area is characterized by hot, humid summers and generally mild to cool winters. According to the Köppen Climate Classification system, Procious has a humid subtropical climate, abbreviated "Cfa" on climate maps.
