= Ovapa, West Virginia =

- Unincorporated community
- Location within West Virginia Location within the United States
- Coordinates: 38°31′17″N 81°08′55″W
- Country: United States
- State: West Virginia
- County: Clay
- Elevation: 876 ft (267 m)
- Time zone: UTC-5 (Eastern (EST))
  - Summer (DST): UTC-4 (EDT)
- ZIP Codes: 25120
- Area codes: 304 & 681
- GNIS feature ID: 1555285

Ovapa is an unincorporated community in Clay County, West Virginia, United States. Ovapa is 5.5 miles (8.9 km) northwest of Clay.

The community's name most likely is a portmanteau of Ohio, Virginia and Pennsylvania.
