= Duck, West Virginia =

Unincorporated community in West Virginia, United States

- Unincorporated community
- Location within West Virginia Location within the United States
- Coordinates: 38°35′00″N 80°56′12″W
- Country: United States
- State: West Virginia
- County: Braxton and Clay
- Elevation: 801 ft (244 m)
- Time zone: UTC-5 (Eastern (EST))
  - Summer (DST): UTC-4 (EDT)
- ZIP code: 25063
- Area codes: 304 & 681
- GNIS feature ID: 1538393

Duck is an unincorporated community along the border of Braxton and Clay counties in West Virginia, United States. Duck is 11.5 miles (18.5 km) northeast of Clay. Duck has a post office with ZIP code 25063.

The origin of the name "Duck" is obscure.
