= Rouzer =

Rouzer may refer to:

- Rouzer, West Virginia, a community in Clay County
- David Rouzer (born 1972), American politician from North Carolina
- John R. Rouzer (1839–1914), American politician from Maryland
