= Indore, West Virginia =

- Unincorporated community
- Location within West Virginia Location within the United States
- Coordinates: 38°21′10″N 81°08′48″W
- Country: United States
- State: West Virginia
- County: Clay
- Elevation: 915 ft (279 m)
- Time zone: UTC-5 (Eastern (EST))
  - Summer (DST): UTC-4 (EDT)
- ZIP code: 25111
- Area codes: 304 & 681
- GNIS feature ID: 1554768

Indore is an unincorporated community in Clay County, West Virginia, United States. Indore is located on West Virginia Route 16, 8 miles (13 km) south-southwest of Clay. Indore has a post office with ZIP code 25111.

The community derives its name from Endor, a place mentioned in the Hebrew Bible.
