= Cressmont, West Virginia =

Coordinates: 38°27′23″N 80°58′40″W

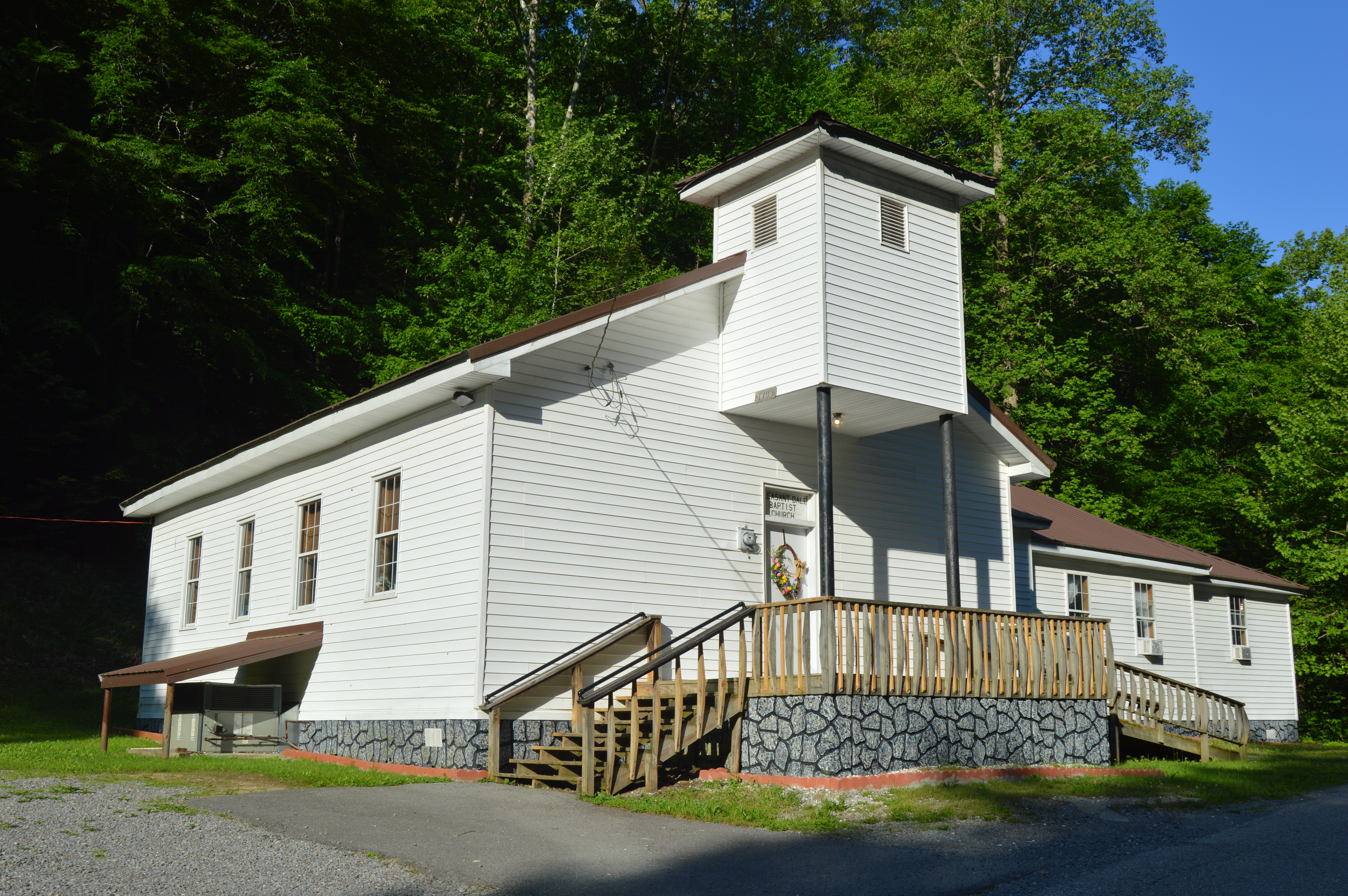
Pleasant Dale Baptist Church

Cressmont is an unincorporated community in Clay County, in the U.S. state of West Virginia.

== History ==
A post office called Cressmont was established in 1907, and remained in operation until 1935. The name Cressmont most likely is derived from the Crescent Lumber Company.
