= Clay Junction, West Virginia =

Unincorporated community in West Virginia, United States

- Unincorporated community
- Location within the state of West Virginia Clay Junction (the United States)
- Coordinates: 38°28′29″N 81°4′39″W
- Country: United States
- State: West Virginia
- County: Clay
- Elevation: 725 ft (221 m)
- Time zone: UTC-5 (Eastern (EST))
  - Summer (DST): UTC-4 (EDT)
- GNIS ID: 1554140

Clay Junction is an unincorporated community in Clay County, West Virginia, United States.
