= Harry R. Truman =

American businessman and airman (1896–1980)

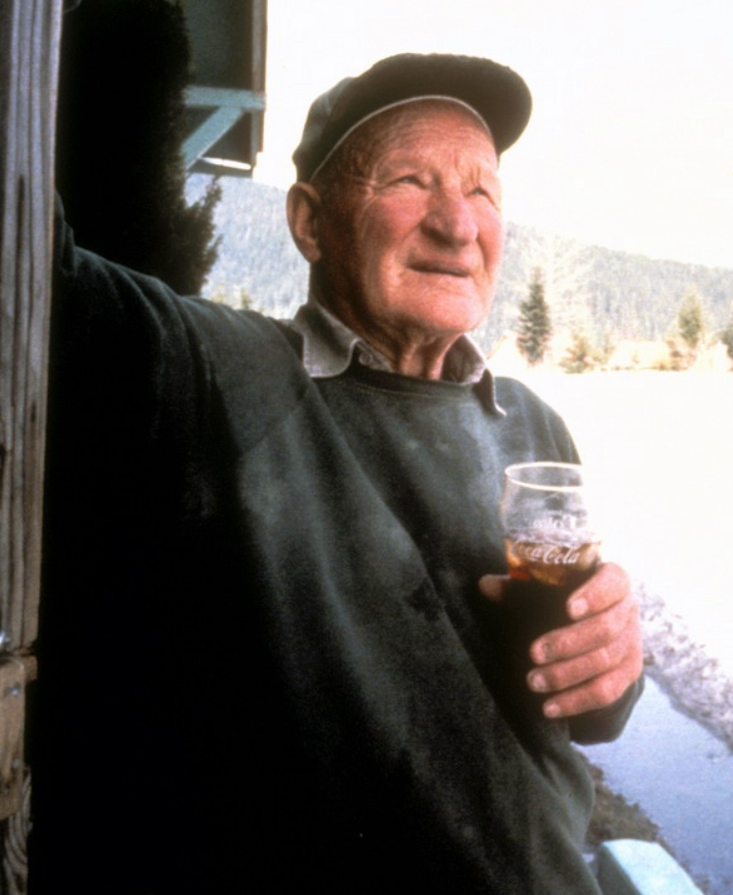
- Truman at his lodge, shortly before his death in 1980
- Born: Harry R. Truman; October 30, 1896; Ivydale, West Virginia, U.S.
- Died: May 18, 1980 (aged 83); Near Mount St. Helens, Washington, U.S. 46°15′59.6″N 122°9′33.3″W
- Occupations: Bootlegger, prospector, caretaker of the Mount St. Helens Lodge
- Spouse(s): Helen Irene Hughes (divorced); Marjorie Bennett (divorced); Edna O. Henrickson (deceased)
- Children: 1
- Military career
- Allegiance: United States
- Branch: United States Army Air Service
- Service years: 1917–1919
- Unit: 100th Aero Squadron
- Conflicts: World War I

Harry R. Truman (October 30, 1896 – May 18, 1980) was an American businessman, bootlegger, and prospector. He lived near Mount St. Helens, a volcano in the Cascade Range in the state of Washington, and was the owner and caretaker of Mount St. Helens Lodge at Spirit Lake near the base of the mountain.

After Mount St. Helens awoke from dormancy in March 1980, Truman became a folk hero in the weeks leading to the volcano's May eruption, refusing to evacuate his home despite repeated orders from authorities. He believed the dangers of eruption had been exaggerated by "those goddamn geologists". On May 18, 1980, Truman was killed in the cataclysmic eruption of Mount St. Helens by a pyroclastic flow that overtook his lodge and buried the site under 150 ft (46 m) of volcanic debris.

== Early life ==
Harry R. Truman was born to foresters in Ivydale, West Virginia, in October 1896. He claimed not to know the exact day of his birth, but he eventually chose to celebrate his birthday on October 30. This date appears on his World War I draft registration card. Truman also stated that he did not know his middle name, only the initial, R; some non-contemporaneous sources have given his middle name as Randall. His draft card lists his middle name as Rainel.

In 1907, Truman's family moved west to the state of Washington, drawn to the promise of cheap land and the successful timber industry in the Pacific Northwest. They at first settled in Napavine, before moving to the town of Nesika in eastern Lewis County, where the family purchased 160 acres (65 ha) of farmland.

== Career ==
Truman attended high school in the city of Mossyrock, Washington, then enlisted in the U.S. Army as a private in August 1917. He was assigned to the 100th Aero Squadron, 7th Squad, and trained as an aeromechanic. He served in France during the final months of World War I. While en route to Europe, his troopship, Tuscania, was sunk by a German U-boat in a torpedo attack off the coast of Ireland.

During his service, he reportedly sustained injuries due to his audacious and independent nature. However, according to Washington State Archives, Truman served overseas from January 24, 1918, until February 1, 1919, but this record states he was not wounded or injured in action and did not participate in any engagements. The record also states that he had a disability rating of zero at the time of his discharge.

Truman was honorably discharged on June 12, 1919, and he began prospecting, but failed to achieve his goal of becoming rich. He later became a bootlegger, smuggling alcohol from San Francisco to Washington during the Prohibition era.

Truman returned to Chehalis, Washington, later that year, where he worked as an automobile mechanic and opened a service station, naming it "Harry's Sudden Service." He married Helen Hughes, the daughter of a sawmill owner; they had one daughter, born in 1922.

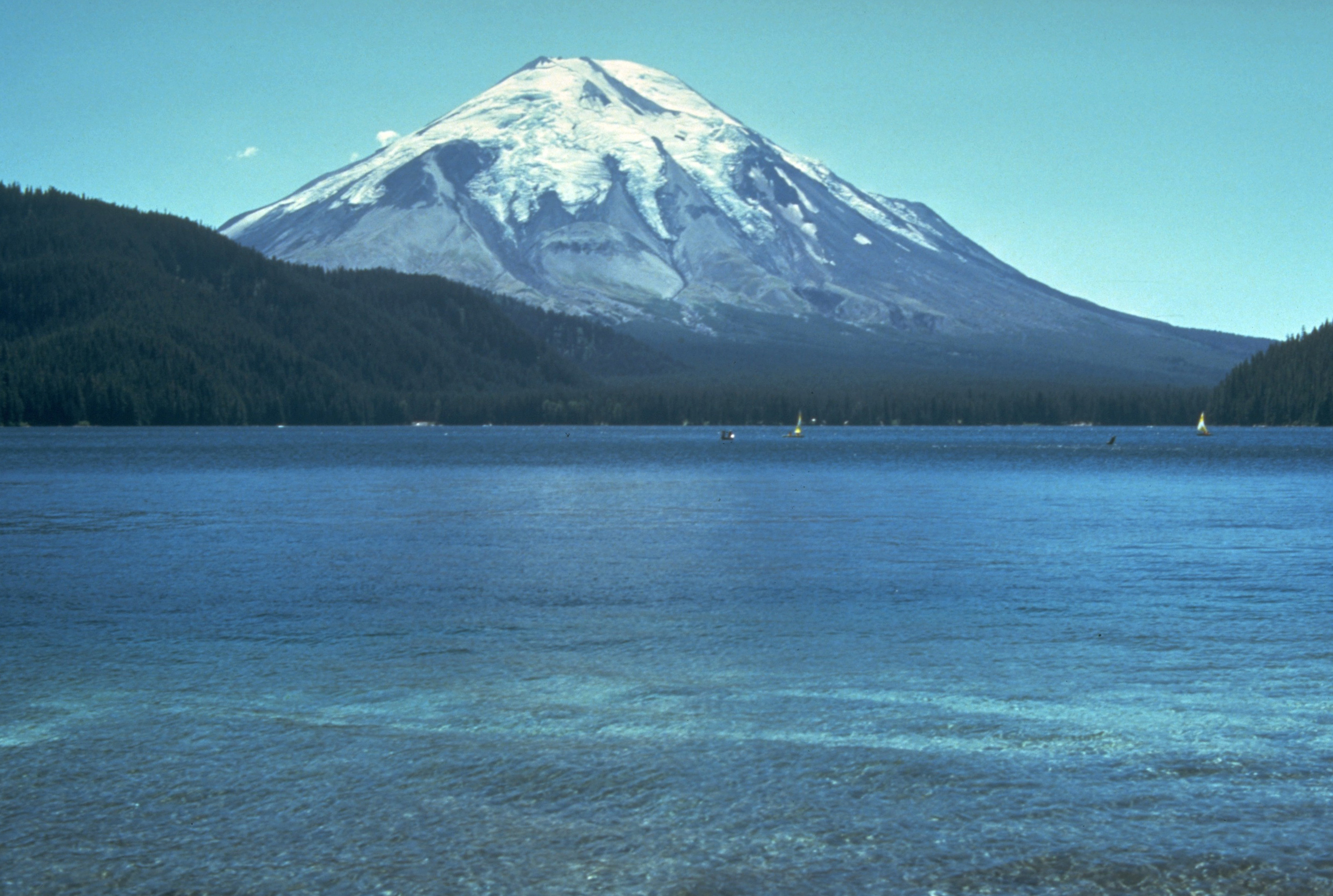
Mount St. Helens and Spirit Lake before the 1980 eruption

In the mid-1920s, Truman leased 50 acres (20 ha) from the Northern Pacific Railway overlooking Spirit Lake in the wilderness near Mount St. Helens, a stratovolcano of the Cascade Range located in Skamania County, Washington. He settled near the base of the mountain and opened a gas station and a small grocery store; he eventually opened the Mount St. Helens Lodge, close to the outlet of Spirit Lake (46°15′56.8″N 122°09′34.4″W), operating it for 52 years.

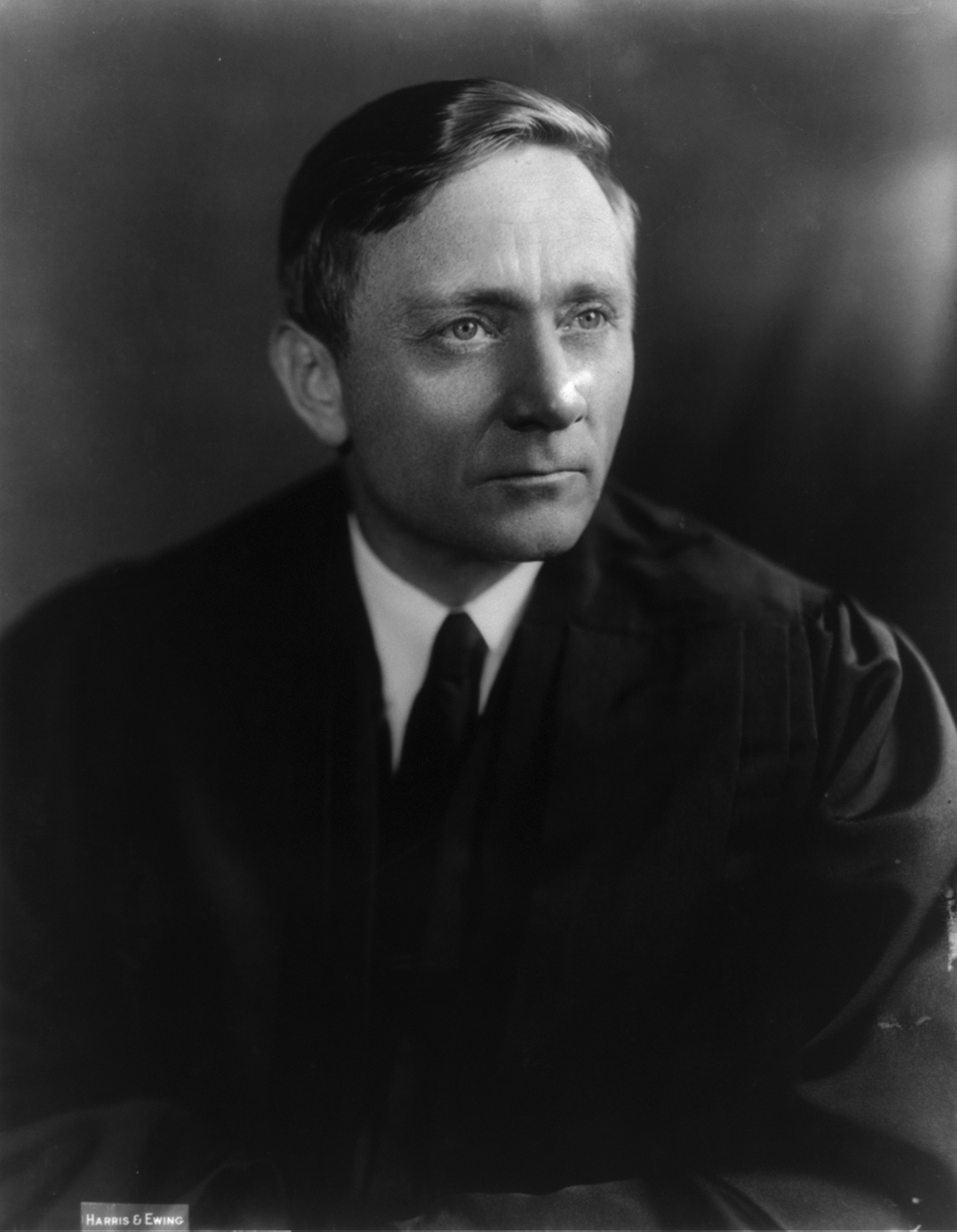
Truman once refused service to Associate Justice William O. Douglas (pictured) at his lodge. Upon learning his identity, he chased Douglas down and convinced him to stay.

Truman divorced his first wife sometime in the early 1930s; he remarried in 1935. The second marriage was short, as he reportedly attempted to win arguments by throwing his wife into Spirit Lake, despite her inability to swim. He began dating a local woman, though he eventually married her sister, Edna, whom he called Edie. This third marriage held, and he and Edna operated the Mount St. Helens Lodge together until her death in 1975.

In the Mount St. Helens area, Truman became a well-known curmudgeon, notorious for his antics; on one instance, he had caused a forest ranger to become drunk so that he was able to burn a pile of brush. He poached, stole gravel from the United States Forest Service, and fished on Native American land with a fake game warden badge. Despite their knowledge of these criminal activities, local rangers failed to catch him in the act. When the Washington state government changed the state sales tax, Truman kept charging the old rate at his lodge. A tax agency employee rented a boat from him, but refused to pay his tax rate, so Truman pushed him into Spirit Lake.

Truman was a fan of the cocktail drink whiskey and Coke, made with Schenley whiskey and Coca-Cola. He owned a pink 1957 Cadillac, and he swore frequently. He loved discussing politics and reportedly disliked Republicans, hippies, young children, and the elderly. In 1953, Truman refused to allow Supreme Court Justice William O. Douglas to stay at his lodge, dismissing him as an "old coot" despite being two years older than Douglas. When he learned who Douglas was, he realized his mistake and chased the Justice for 1.6 km (1 mi) to a neighboring lodge and convinced him to return; Truman and Douglas became friends for the rest of their lives, often drinking together. After his wife Edna died of a heart attack in September 1975, Truman lost interest in maintaining his lodge and it gradually fell into disrepair. He began renting only a limited number of cabins and boats during the summer months. Truman became increasingly ill-tempered and his drinking becoming more frequent.

== Celebrity ==
Although Truman was already well-known by local residents for his various antics, he became an even bigger celebrity during the two months of volcanic activity preceding the deadly eruption of Mount St. Helens on May 18, 1980. Truman gave several interviews to local and national reporters and expressed his opinion that the danger of a major volcanic eruption was exaggerated. "I don't have any idea whether it will blow," he said, "but I don't believe it to the point that I'm going to pack up." Truman displayed little concern about the volcano and his situation: "If the mountain goes, I'm going with it. This area is heavily timbered, Spirit Lake is in between me and the mountain, and the mountain is a mile away, the mountain ain't gonna hurt me." Law enforcement and Forest Service officials were frustrated by his refusal to evacuate because the media continued to enter the volcano's restricted zone to interview him, endangering themselves in the process. Still, Truman remained steadfast. "You couldn't pull me out with a mule team. That mountain's part of Truman and Truman's part of that mountain."

Truman told reporters that he was knocked from his bed by precursor earthquakes, so he responded by sleeping in the basement. He claimed to wear spurs to bed to cope with the earthquakes while he slept. He scoffed at the public's concern for his safety, responding to scientists' claims about the threat of the volcano that "the mountain has shot its wad and it hasn't hurt my place a bit, but those goddamn geologists with their hair down to their butts wouldn't pay no attention to ol' Truman."

As a result of his defiant commentary, Truman became an impromptu folk hero, and was the subject of many songs and poems by children. One group of school children from Salem, Oregon, sent him banners inscribed "Harry – We Love You", which moved him so much that he took a helicopter trip (arranged and paid for by National Geographic) to visit them on May 14. He also received many fan letters, including several marriage proposals. A group of fifth grade students from Grand Blanc, Michigan, wrote letters that brought him to tears. In return, he sent them a letter and volcanic ash, which the children later sold to send flowers to his family after the eruption.

Truman caused a media frenzy, appearing on the front pages of The New York Times and the San Francisco Examiner and attracting the attention of National Geographic, United Press International, and The Today Show. Many major magazines composed profiles, including Time, Life, Newsweek, Field & Stream, and Reader's Digest. Historian Richard W. Slatta wrote that "his fiery attitude, brash speech, love of the outdoors, and fierce independence… made him a folk hero the media could adore." Slatta pointed to Truman's "unbendable character and response to the forces of nature" as a source of his rise to fame, and the interviews with him added "color" to reports about the events at Mount St. Helens. Truman was immortalized, according to Slatta, "with many of the embellished qualities of the western hero," and the media spotlight created a persona that was "in some ways quite different from his true character."

== Death ==
As the likelihood of a major eruption increased, state officials ordered an evacuation of the area with the exception of a few scientists and security officials. On Saturday, May 17, local law enforcement made one final attempt to persuade Truman to leave his home, to no avail. On Sunday, May 18, at 8:32 a.m., Mount St. Helens erupted, collapsing the entire northern flank of the mountain. Truman and his 16 cats all likely died of a heat shock response in less than a second, too quickly to realize what was happening or register pain. Truman considered his cats to be family and mentioned them in nearly all of his public statements.

The largest landslide in recorded history and a pyroclastic flow traveling atop the landslide engulfed the Spirit Lake area almost simultaneously, destroying the lake and burying the site of Truman's lodge under 46 m (150 ft) of volcanic landslide debris. Authorities never searched for Truman's remains.

Initially, Truman's friends hoped that he possibly survived, as he had claimed to have provisioned a nearby abandoned mine shaft with food and liquor in case of an eruption, but the lack of any immediate warning of the eruption would almost certainly have prevented him from escaping to the shaft before the pyroclastic flow reached his lodge, less than a minute after the eruption began. Even if Truman had made it there, the landslide would have made any rescue impossible. Truman's sister, Geraldine, said that she found it hard to accept the reality of his death. "I don't think he made it, but I thought if they would let me fly over and see for myself that Harry's lodge is gone, then maybe I'd believe it for sure."

Truman's niece, Shirley Rosen, added that her uncle thought he could escape the volcano, but was not expecting the lateral eruption. She stated that her sister took him a bottle of bourbon whiskey to persuade him to evacuate, but he was too afraid to drink alcohol at the time because he was unsure whether the shaking was coming from his body or the earthquakes. Truman owned a second home located between Washougal and Stevenson, Washington, and his possessions were auctioned off there as keepsakes to admirers in September.

== Legacy ==
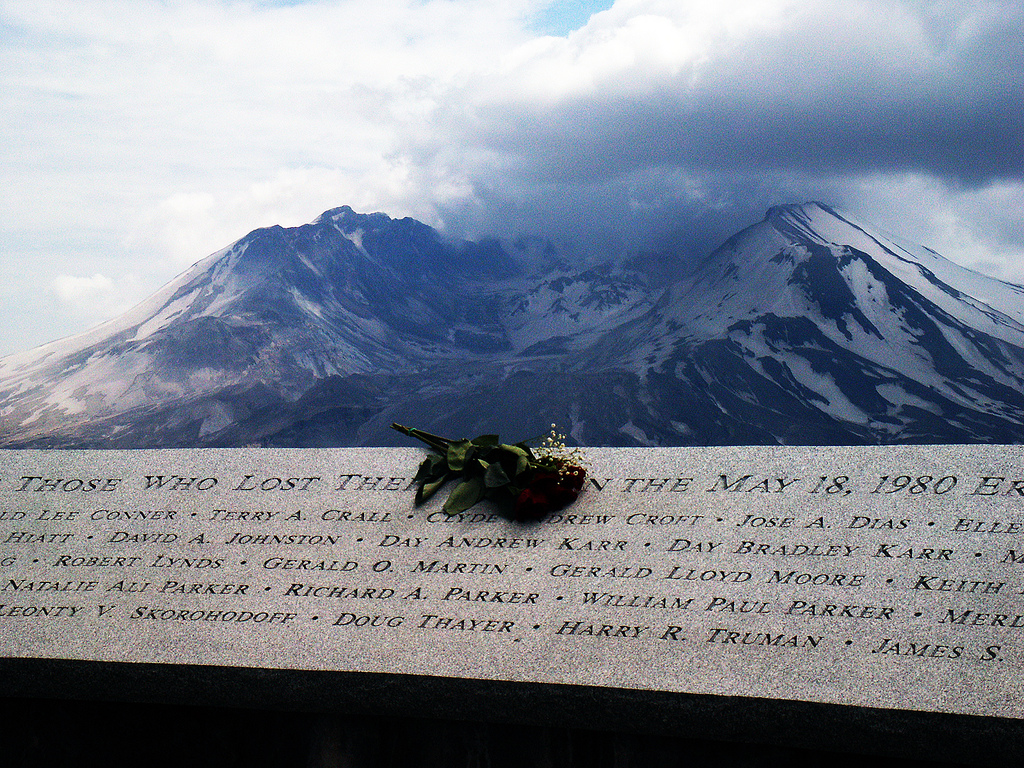
Truman's name is on a plaque (bottom right) with names of the 57 victims of the May 18 eruption, with Mount St. Helens in the background.

Truman emerged as a folk hero for his resistance to the evacuation efforts. The Columbian wrote: "With his 10-dollar name and hell-no-I-won't-go attitude, Truman was a made-for-prime-time folk hero." His friends and family commented: "He was a very opinionated person." Truman's friend John Garrity added, "The mountain and the lake were his life. If he'd left and then saw what the mountain did to his lake, it would have killed him anyway. He always said he wanted to die at Spirit Lake. He went the way he wanted to go."

Truman's niece Shirley stated, "He used to say 'that's my mountain and my lake' and he would say 'those are my arms and my legs.' If he would have seen it the way it is now, I don't think he would have survived." Truman's cousin Richard Ice commented that Truman's short period as a celebrity was "the peak of his life."

Truman was the subject of the books Truman of St. Helens: The Man and His Mountain, written by his niece Shirley Rosen, and The Legend of Harry Truman, written by his sister, Geri Whiting. He was portrayed by Art Carney, his favorite actor, in the made-for-cable HBO television film St. Helens (1981). Memorabilia were sold in the area surrounding Mount St. Helens, including Harry R. Truman hats, pictures, posters, and postcards. A restaurant named after him was opened in Anchorage, Alaska, serving themed dishes such as Harry's Hot Molten Chili.

According to The Washington Star, more than 100 songs had been composed in Truman's honor by 1981, in addition to a commemorative album entitled The Musical Legend of Harry Truman — A Very Special Collection of Mount St. Helens' Volcano Songs. Lula Belle Garland wrote "The Legend of Harry and the Mountain," which was recorded in 1980 by Ron Shaw & the Desert Wind Band. Musicians Ron Allen and Steve Asplund wrote a country rock song in 1980 called "Harry Truman, Your Spirit Still Lives On". One of the major characters from the first two seasons of TV show Twin Peaks (1990–1991) was named Sheriff Harry S. Truman in his honor. Billy Jonas included Truman's narrative in his song "Old St. Helen" in 1993. He is the subject of the 2007 song "Harry Truman" written and recorded by Irish musical project Headgear.

Truman Trail and Harry's Ridge in the Mount St. Helens region are named after him. The Harry R. Truman Memorial Park was named in his honor in Castle Rock, Washington, though it later was renamed Castle Rock Lions Club Volunteer Park.
