= Elk Forest, West Virginia =

Unincorporated community in West Virginia, United States

- Unincorporated community
- Location in West Virginia and the United States Elk Forest (the United States)
- Coordinates: 38°23′22″N 81°35′35″W
- Country: United States
- State: West Virginia
- County: Kanawha
- Time zone: UTC-5 (Eastern (EST))
  - Summer (DST): UTC-4 (EDT)

Elk Forest is a residential community out Elk Forest Road, which turns off U.S. Route 119 in Kanawha County, West Virginia, United States. Originally built in the late 1950s-early 1960s, it is a part of Mink Shoals, originally willed for development by Amanda Pitzer at her death, now buried at a small cemetery across the road from Elk Forest along Ventura Acres Road. It is directly opposite Dutch Road, which is a part of the Old German Settlement at Mink Shoals.
