= Dink, West Virginia =

Unincorporated community in West Virginia, United States

- Unincorporated community
- Location within the state of West Virginia Dink (the United States)
- Coordinates: 38°34′7″N 81°3′34″W
- Country: United States
- State: West Virginia
- County: Clay
- Elevation: 879 ft (268 m)
- Time zone: UTC-5 (Eastern (EST))
  - Summer (DST): UTC-4 (EDT)
- GNIS ID: 1549656

Dink is an unincorporated community in Clay County, West Virginia, United States. Its post office is closed.
