= Dorfee, West Virginia =

Unincorporated community in West Virginia, United States

- Unincorporated community
- Location within the state of West Virginia Dorfee (the United States)
- Coordinates: 38°26′37″N 81°10′29″W
- Country: United States
- State: West Virginia
- County: Clay
- Elevation: 676 ft (206 m)
- Time zone: UTC-5 (Eastern (EST))
  - Summer (DST): UTC-4 (EDT)
- GNIS ID: 1558357

Dorfee is an unincorporated community in Clay County, West Virginia, United States. Its post office has been closed.

Dorfee was most likely derived from the name D'Urfee.
