= Booger Hole, West Virginia =

Unincorporated community in West Virginia, United States

- Unincorporated community
- Location within West Virginia Location within the United States
- Coordinates: 38°34′07.82″N 81°03′42.03″W
- Country: United States
- State: West Virginia
- Counties: Clay
- Elevation: 909 ft (277 m)
- Time zone: UTC-5 (Eastern (EST))
  - Summer (DST): UTC-4 (EDT)
- Area codes: 304 & 681

Booger Hole is an unincorporated community in northern Clay County, West Virginia, United States. It is located in the Rush Fork Valley, near the town of Ivydale.

== Name ==
Booger Hole has been noted for its unusual place name.

== History ==
In 1917, the community was subjected to "about a dozen" murders during a short period of time. A special grand jury was convened to investigate the incidents, and the community itself formed what they referred to as a "mob", posting notices threatening to "get bloodhounds and detectives and run [the murderer] to the ends of the earth." Although folklore has it that the community's name derived from this violence – "booger" being a local usage for the "boogieman" – a contemporary press account clearly shows that the community was already called "Booger Hole" at the time of the murders.
