= Queen Shoals, West Virginia =

- Unincorporated community
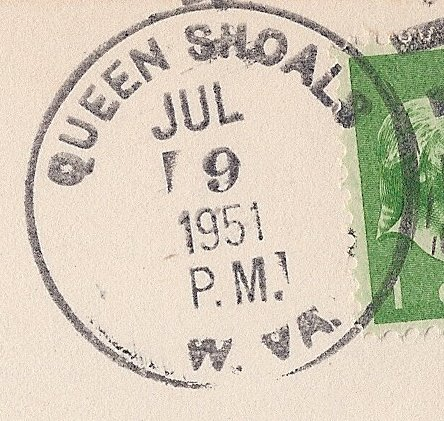
- Queen Shoals postmark

- Location within the state of West Virginia Queen Shoals (the United States)
- Coordinates: 38°28′16″N 81°16′59″W
- Country: United States
- State: West Virginia
- County: Clay
- Elevation: 646 ft (197 m)
- Time zone: UTC-5 (Eastern (EST))
  - Summer (DST): UTC-4 (EDT)
- GNIS ID: 1545336

Queen Shoals is an unincorporated community in Clay County, West Virginia, United States. Its post office has been closed.

The community was named after nearby Queen Shoal Creek.
