= Enoch, West Virginia =

Unincorporated community in West Virginia, United States

- Unincorporated community
- Enoch
- Nickname: Dog Run
- Location within the state of West Virginia Enoch (the United States)
- Coordinates: 38°25′28″N 80°56′4″W
- Country: United States
- State: West Virginia
- County: Clay
- Elevation: 1,480 ft (450 m)
- Time zone: UTC-5 (Eastern (EST))
  - Summer (DST): UTC-4 (EDT)
- ZIP codes: 25043
- GNIS ID: 1554405

Enoch is an unincorporated community in Clay County, West Virginia, United States. Its post office is closed.

The community most likely was named after a local family called Enoch family.
