= Bentree, West Virginia =

Unincorporated community in West Virginia, United States

- Unincorporated community
- Location within West Virginia
- Coordinates: 38°17′01″N 81°11′27″W
- Country: United States
- State: West Virginia
- Counties: Clay and Nicholas
- Elevation: 906 ft (276 m)
- Time zone: UTC-5 (Eastern (EST))
  - Summer (DST): UTC-4 (EDT)
- ZIP codes: 25018
- Area codes: 304 & 681
- GNIS feature ID: 1535652

Bentree is an unincorporated community in Clay and Nicholas counties, West Virginia, United States. Bentree is located on West Virginia Route 16, 8 miles (13 km) north of Gauley Bridge.
