= Paxton, West Virginia =

- Unincorporated community
- Location within the state of West Virginia Paxton (the United States)
- Coordinates: 38°29′53″N 81°10′4″W
- Country: United States
- State: West Virginia
- County: Clay
- Elevation: 791 ft (241 m)
- Time zone: UTC-5 (Eastern (EST))
  - Summer (DST): UTC-4 (EDT)
- GNIS ID: 1544647

Paxton is an unincorporated community in Clay County, West Virginia, United States. Its post office is closed.
