= Mountain Home, West Virginia =

- Unincorporated community
- Location within the state of West Virginia Mountain Home (the United States)
- Coordinates: 38°21′20″N 81°3′13″W
- Country: United States
- State: West Virginia
- County: Clay
- Elevation: 1,234 ft (376 m)
- Time zone: UTC-5 (Eastern (EST))
  - Summer (DST): UTC-4 (EDT)
- GNIS ID: 1543861

Mountain Home is an unincorporated community in Clay County, West Virginia, United States.
