= Lizemores, West Virginia =

- Unincorporated community
- Location within West Virginia Location within the United States
- Coordinates: 38°20′02″N 81°10′30″W
- Country: United States
- State: West Virginia
- County: Clay
- Elevation: 994 ft (303 m)
- Time zone: UTC-5 (Eastern (EST))
  - Summer (DST): UTC-4 (EDT)
- ZIP code: 25125
- Area codes: 304 & 681
- GNIS feature ID: 1549788

Lizemores is an unincorporated community in Clay County, West Virginia, United States. Lizemores is located on West Virginia Route 16, 10 miles (16 km) southwest of Clay. Lizemores has a post office with ZIP code 25125.

The community derives its name from the local Sizemore family (a recording error by postal officials accounts for the error in spelling, which was never corrected).
