= Odessa, West Virginia =

- Unincorporated community
- Location within the state of West Virginia Odessa (the United States)
- Coordinates: 38°25′43″N 81°14′16″W
- Country: United States
- State: West Virginia
- County: Clay
- Elevation: 928 ft (283 m)
- Time zone: UTC-5 (Eastern (EST))
  - Summer (DST): UTC-4 (EDT)
- GNIS ID: 1549860

Odessa is an unincorporated community in Clay County, West Virginia, United States. Its post office is closed.

According to tradition, the community was named after the love interest of an early settler.
