= Clay County, West Virginia =

County in West Virginia, United States

- County
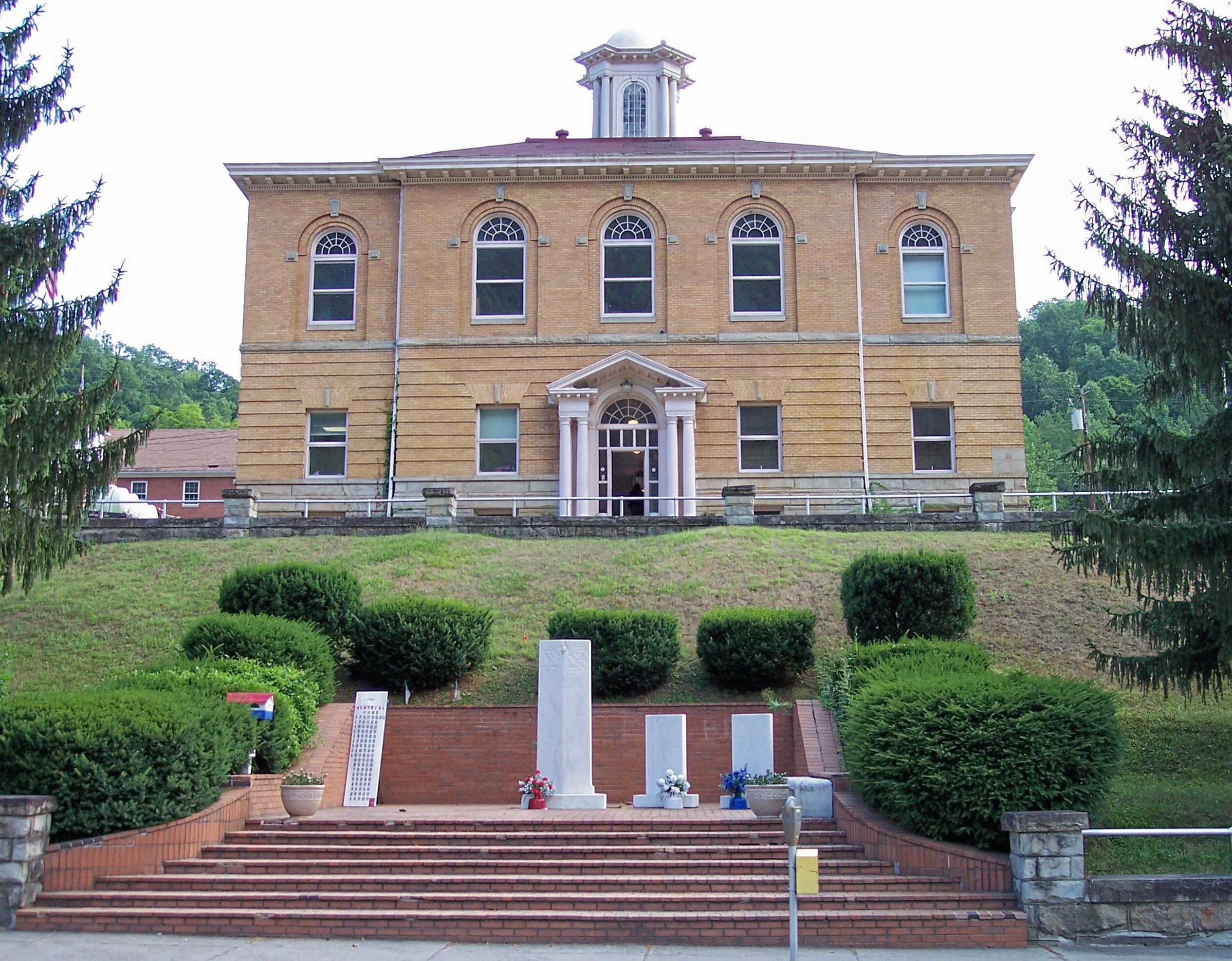
- The Old Clay County Courthouse in Clay in 2007

- Seal

- Location within the U.S. state of West Virginia
- Coordinates: 38°28′N 81°04′W
- Country: United States
- State: West Virginia
- Founded: March 29, 1858
- Named for: Henry Clay
- Seat: Clay
- Largest town: Clay

Area
  - Total: 344 sq mi (890 km^{2})
  - Land: 342 sq mi (890 km^{2})
  - Water: 1.9 sq mi (4.9 km^{2}) 0.5%

Population (2020)
  - Total: 8,051
  - Estimate (2025): 7,538 ▼
  - Density: 23.5/sq mi (9.09/km^{2})
- Time zone: UTC−5 (Eastern)
  - Summer (DST): UTC−4 (EDT)
- Congressional district: 1st
- Website: claycountywv.us

Clay County is a county in the U.S. state of West Virginia. As of the 2020 census, the population was 8,051. Its county seat is Clay. The county was founded in 1858 and named in honor of Henry Clay, famous American statesman, member of the United States Senate from Kentucky and United States Secretary of State in the 19th century. Clay County is part of the Charleston, WV Metropolitan Statistical Area.

== Geography ==
According to the United States Census Bureau, the county has a total area of 344 square miles (890 km^{2}), of which 342 square miles (890 km^{2}) is land and 1.9 square miles (4.9 km^{2}) (0.6%) is water.

In 1863, West Virginia's counties were divided into civil townships, with the intention of encouraging local government. This proved impractical in the heavily rural state, and in 1872 the townships were converted into magisterial districts. Clay County was divided into four districts: Buffalo, Henry, Pleasant, and Union. A fifth district, Otter, was created from part of Henry in 1876. Between 1990 and 2000, these districts were consolidated into Districts A, B, and C. The county has access to Interstate 79 at the Big Otter and Wallback exits. In 2025, the Mountain Transit Authority began providing public transportation services to Clay County.

=== Major highways ===
- Interstate 79
- West Virginia Route 4
- West Virginia Route 16
- West Virginia Route 36

=== Adjacent counties ===
- Calhoun County (north)
- Braxton County (northeast)
- Nicholas County (southeast)
- Kanawha County (west)
- Roane County (northwest)

== Demographics ==
Historical population
Census	Pop.	Note	%±
1860	1,787		—
1870	2,196		22.9%
1880	3,460		57.6%
1890	4,659		34.7%
1900	8,248		77.0%
1910	10,233		24.1%
1920	11,486		12.2%
1930	13,125		14.3%
1940	15,206		15.9%
1950	14,961		−1.6%
1960	11,942		−20.2%
1970	9,330		−21.9%
1980	11,265		20.7%
1990	9,983		−11.4%
2000	10,330		3.5%
2010	9,386		−9.1%
2020	8,051		−14.2%
2025 (est.)	7,538	▼	−6.4%
U.S. Decennial Census; 1790–1960 1900–1990; 1990–2000 2010–2020

=== 2020 census ===
As of the 2020 census, the county had a population of 8,051. Of the residents, 21.5% were under the age of 18 and 21.9% were 65 years of age or older; the median age was 46.1 years. For every 100 females there were 102.6 males, and for every 100 females age 18 and over there were 99.8 males.

The racial makeup of the county was 95.3% White, 0.2% Black or African American, 0.4% American Indian and Alaska Native, 0.2% Asian, 0.0% from some other race, and 4.0% from two or more races. Hispanic or Latino residents of any race comprised 0.6% of the population.

There were 3,224 households in the county, of which 28.9% had children under the age of 18 living with them and 23.0% had a female householder with no spouse or partner present. About 26.5% of all households were made up of individuals and 12.8% had someone living alone who was 65 years of age or older.

There were 3,907 housing units, of which 17.5% were vacant. Among occupied housing units, 81.2% were owner-occupied and 18.8% were renter-occupied. The homeowner vacancy rate was 1.8% and the rental vacancy rate was 10.1%.

Clay County, West Virginia – Racial and ethnic composition Note: the US Census treats Hispanic/Latino as an ethnic category. This table excludes Latinos from the racial categories and assigns them to a separate category. Hispanics/Latinos may be of any race.
Race / Ethnicity (NH = Non-Hispanic)	Pop 2000	Pop 2010	Pop 2020	% 2000	% 2010	% 2020
White alone (NH)	10,108	9,243	7,651	97.85%	98.47%	95.03%
Black or African American alone (NH)	7	6	11	0.03%	0.06%	0.13%
Native American or Alaska Native alone (NH)	73	19	29	0.70%	0.20%	0.36%
Asian alone (NH)	2	7	13	0.01%	0.07%	0.16%
Pacific Islander alone (NH)	0	2	0	0.00%	0.02%	0.00%
Other race alone (NH)	6	3	1	0.05%	0.03%	0.01%
Mixed race or Multiracial (NH)	92	73	294	0.89%	0.77%	3.65%
Hispanic or Latino (any race)	42	33	52	0.40%	0.35%	0.64%
Total	10,330	9,386	8,051	100.00%	100.00%	100.00%

=== 2010 census ===
As of the 2010 United States census, there were 9,386 people, 3,728 households, and 2,566 families living in the county. The population density was 27.5 inhabitants per square mile (10.6/km^{2}). There were 4,572 housing units at an average density of 13.4 per square mile (5.2/km^{2}). The racial makeup of the county was 98.8% white, 0.2% American Indian, 0.1% black or African American, 0.1% Asian, 0.1% from other races, and 0.8% from two or more races. Those of Hispanic or Latino origin made up 0.4% of the population. In terms of ancestry, 17.6% were Irish, 14.7% were English, 13.2% were German, 11.0% were American, and 5.0% were Dutch.

Of the 3,728 households, 31.3% had children under the age of 18 living with them, 53.6% were married couples living together, 9.7% had a female householder with no husband present, 31.2% were non-families, and 26.2% of all households were made up of individuals. The average household size was 2.50 and the average family size was 3.00. The median age was 41.5 years.

The median income for a household in the county was $30,789 and the median income for a family was $40,634. Males had a median income of $42,269 versus $24,402 for females. The per capita income for the county was $16,205. About 22.4% of families and 23.7% of the population were below the poverty line, including 29.3% of those under age 18 and 21.1% of those age 65 or over.

=== 2000 census ===
As of the census of 2000, there were 10,330 people, 4,020 households, and 2,942 families living in the county. The population density was 30 people per square mile (12 people/km^{2}). There were 4,836 housing units at an average density of 14 per square mile (5.4/km^{2}). The racial makeup of the county was 98.22% White, 0.08% Black or African American, 0.71% Native American, 0.02% Asian, 0.09% from other races, and 0.89% from two or more races. 0.41% of the population were Hispanic or Latino of any race.

There were 4,020 households, out of which 33.50% had children under the age of 18 living with them, 58.20% were married couples living together, 10.40% had a female householder with no husband present, and 26.80% were non-families. 24.30% of all households were made up of individuals, and 11.40% had someone living alone who was 65 years of age or older. The average household size was 2.55 and the average family size was 3.01.

In the county, the population was spread out, with 25.60% under the age of 18, 9.00% from 18 to 24, 27.50% from 25 to 44, 24.20% from 45 to 64, and 13.70% who were 65 years of age or older. The median age was 37 years. For every 100 females, there were 97.90 males. For every 100 females age 18 and over, there were 97.30 males.

The median income for a household in the county was $22,120, and the median income for a family was $27,137. Males had a median income of $30,161 versus $16,642 for females. The per capita income for the county was $12,021. About 24.40% of families and 27.50% of the population were below the poverty line, including 37.00% of those under age 18 and 15.00% of those age 65 or over.

== Communities ==
=== Town ===
- Clay (county seat)

=== Unincorporated communities ===
- Adonijah
- Avoca
- Bentree (partly in Nicholas County)
- Bickmore
- Big Otter
- Bomont
- Booger Hole
- Clay Junction
- Cressmont
- Dille
- Dink
- Dorfee
- Duck
- Dundon
- Eakle
- Elkhurst
- Enoch
- Floe
- Fola
- Glen
- Harrison
- Hartland
- Independence
- Indore
- Ivydale
- Little Italy
- Lizemores
- Marne
- Maysel
- Mountain Home
- Nebo
- O'Brion
- Odessa
- Ossia
- Ovapa
- Paxton
- Porter
- Procious
- Queen Shoals
- Rouzer
- Spread
- Swandale
- Triplett
- Two Run
- Valley Fork
- Varneytown
- Wallback (partly in Roane County)
- Whetstone
- Widen

== Politics ==
Like most of West Virginia, Clay County was reliably Democratic throughout the 20th century, but it has shifted to being sharply Republican in recent years.

United States presidential election results for Clay County, West Virginia
Year	Republican		Democratic		Third party(ies)	
Year	No.	%	No.	%	No.	%
1912	352	16.72%	932	44.28%	821	39.00%
1916	1,021	48.76%	1,047	50.00%	26	1.24%
1920	1,981	56.37%	1,533	43.63%	0	0.00%
1924	1,843	47.02%	2,037	51.96%	40	1.02%
1928	2,551	56.76%	1,929	42.92%	14	0.31%
1932	2,443	44.43%	3,038	55.25%	18	0.33%
1936	2,513	42.56%	3,387	57.36%	5	0.08%
1940	2,881	45.26%	3,485	54.74%	0	0.00%
1944	2,114	46.88%	2,395	53.12%	0	0.00%
1948	2,366	44.21%	2,978	55.64%	8	0.15%
1952	2,534	47.38%	2,814	52.62%	0	0.00%
1956	2,820	51.76%	2,628	48.24%	0	0.00%
1960	2,406	45.70%	2,859	54.30%	0	0.00%
1964	1,366	30.04%	3,182	69.96%	0	0.00%
1968	1,474	39.42%	1,916	51.24%	349	9.33%
1972	2,168	54.23%	1,830	45.77%	0	0.00%
1976	1,282	32.51%	2,662	67.49%	0	0.00%
1980	1,452	38.60%	2,185	58.08%	125	3.32%
1984	1,667	43.91%	2,117	55.77%	12	0.32%
1988	1,536	40.30%	2,263	59.38%	12	0.31%
1992	1,255	34.32%	1,928	52.72%	474	12.96%
1996	1,137	31.79%	2,074	57.98%	366	10.23%
2000	1,887	52.68%	1,617	45.14%	78	2.18%
2004	2,198	53.98%	1,835	45.06%	39	0.96%
2008	1,755	53.75%	1,421	43.52%	89	2.73%
2012	1,971	65.31%	931	30.85%	116	3.84%
2016	2,300	76.79%	568	18.96%	127	4.24%
2020	2,679	79.61%	641	19.05%	45	1.34%
2024	2,597	80.15%	580	17.90%	63	1.94%

== In popular culture ==
Clay County is also the birthplace of the Golden Delicious Apple. The original tree was found on the Mullins' family farm in Clay County, West Virginia, United States and was locally known as Mullin's Yellow Seedling and Annit apple.

Clay County has celebrated the apple each fall with the annual Clay County Golden Delicious Festival since 1972.

== See also ==
- Clay County Schools
- National Register of Historic Places listings in Clay County, West Virginia
