= Ossia, West Virginia =

- Unincorporated community
- Location within the state of West Virginia Ossia (the United States)
- Coordinates: 38°35′20″N 81°1′36″W
- Country: United States
- State: West Virginia
- County: Clay
- Elevation: 846 ft (258 m)
- Time zone: UTC-5 (Eastern (EST))
  - Summer (DST): UTC-4 (EDT)
- GNIS ID: 1549865

Ossia is an unincorporated community in Clay County, West Virginia, United States.
