= Elkhurst, West Virginia =

Unincorporated community in West Virginia, US

Coordinates: 38°26′51″N 81°09′21″W

Elkhurst is an unincorporated community in Clay County, in the U.S. state of West Virginia.

== History ==
The community derives its name from the nearby Elk River. A variant name was Yankee Dam. A post office called Yankee Dam was in operation between 1882 and 1910.
