= Triplett, Clay County, West Virginia =

Triplett, West Virginia
- Unincorporated community
- Location within the state of West Virginia Triplett (the United States)
- Coordinates: 38°28′35″N 81°2′9″W
- Country: United States
- State: West Virginia
- County: Clay
- Elevation: 1,319 ft (402 m)
- Time zone: UTC-5 (Eastern (EST))
  - Summer (DST): UTC-4 (EDT)
- GNIS ID: 1555824

Triplett is an unincorporated community in Clay County, West Virginia, United States.
