= Eakle, West Virginia =

Unincorporated community in West Virginia, United States

- Unincorporated community
- Location within the state of West Virginia Eakle (the United States)
- Coordinates: 38°26′49″N 80°55′37″W
- Country: United States
- State: West Virginia
- County: Clay
- Elevation: 1,096 ft (334 m)
- Time zone: UTC-5 (Eastern (EST))
  - Summer (DST): UTC-4 (EDT)
- GNIS ID: 1554347

Eakle is an unincorporated community in Clay County, West Virginia, United States. Its post office is closed.
