= Handley, West Virginia =

- Town
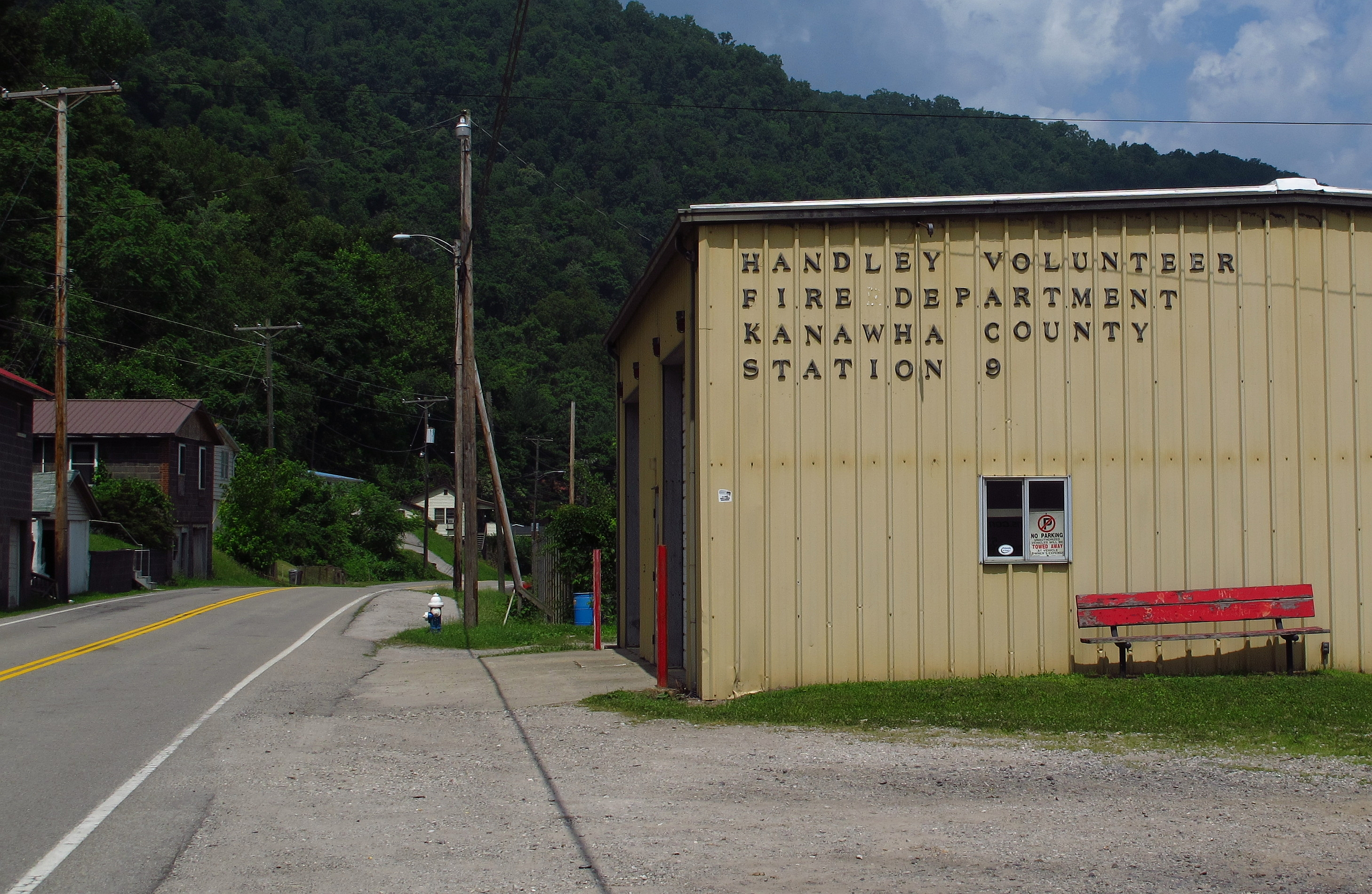
- State Route 61 in Handley

- Location of Handley in Kanawha County, West Virginia.
- Coordinates: 38°11′12″N 81°21′50″W
- Country: United States
- State: West Virginia
- County: Kanawha

Area
  - Total: 0.97 sq mi (2.52 km^{2})
  - Land: 0.95 sq mi (2.47 km^{2})
  - Water: 0.019 sq mi (0.05 km^{2})
- Elevation: 643 ft (196 m)

Population (2020)
  - Total: 223
  - Estimate (2021): 220
  - Density: 327.1/sq mi (126.29/km^{2})
- Time zone: UTC-5 (Eastern (EST))
  - Summer (DST): UTC-4 (EDT)
- ZIP code: 25102
- Area code: 304
- FIPS code: 54-34756
- GNIS feature ID: 1554637

Handley is a town in Kanawha County, West Virginia, United States. The population was 224 at the 2020 census. Handley was first established in 1877 and known as Upper Creek until July 29, 1881, when its name was changed to Handley for pioneer settlers who farmed the area. Handley has the distinction of bearing a name like no other town in the United States. The town was incorporated November 1972.

Handley is located in the Upper Kanawha Valley on the south side of the Kanawha River on West Virginia Route 61, along the Chesapeake & Ohio Railways (Now CSX Transportation). Railroad yards moved here from nearby Montgomery in 1899. Trains and barges hauled coal for the Chesapeake Mining Company until deposits were removed from the town and surrounding hills.

== Geography ==
According to the United States Census Bureau, the town has a total area of 0.97 square miles (2.51 km^{2}), of which 0.95 square miles (2.46 km^{2}) is land and 0.02 square miles (0.05 km^{2}) is water.

== Demographics ==
Historical population
Census	Pop.	Note	%±
1980	633		—
1990	334		−47.2%
2000	362		8.4%
2010	349		−3.6%
2020	223		−36.1%
2021 (est.)	220	▼	−1.3%
U.S. Decennial Census

The median income for a household in the town was $21,429, and the median income for a family was $26,250. Males had a median income of $22,188 versus $16,875 for females. The per capita income for the town was $11,556. About 14.2% of families and 21.1% of the population were below the poverty line, including 36.5% of those under age 18 and 19.0% of those age 65 or over.

=== 2010 census ===
As of the census of 2010, there were 349 people, 131 households, and 92 families living in the town. The population density was 367.4 inhabitants per square mile (141.9/km^{2}). There were 156 housing units at an average density of 164.2 per square mile (63.4/km^{2}). The racial makeup of the town was 89.7% White, 6.3% African American, and 4.0% from two or more races. Hispanic or Latino of any race were 0.6% of the population.

There were 131 households, of which 31.3% had children under the age of 18 living with them, 45.8% were married couples living together, 17.6% had a female householder with no husband present, 6.9% had a male householder with no wife present, and 29.8% were non-families. 26.7% of all households were made up of individuals, and 15.3% had someone living alone who was 65 years of age or older. The average household size was 2.66 and the average family size was 3.15.

The median age in the town was 36.3 years. 25.2% of residents were under the age of 18; 7.8% were between the ages of 18 and 24; 28.3% were from 25 to 44; 21% were from 45 to 64; and 17.8% were 65 years of age or older. The gender makeup of the town was 51.6% male and 48.4% female.

== Notable person ==
- MLB first baseman John Kruk
