= Ad-Dilli =

Ad-Dilli الدلي
- Village
- Location within Syria
- Coordinates: 32°54′13″N 36°09′32″E
- PAL: 258/257
- Country: Syria
- Governorate: Daraa
- District: Izraa
- Subdistrict: Shaykh Miskin

Population (2004)
  - Total: 1,271
- Time zone: UTC+2 (EET)
  - Summer (DST): UTC+3 (EEST)

Ad-Dilli (Arabic: الدلي) is a village in southern Syria, administratively part of the Izraa District in the Daraa Governorate. According to the Syria Central Bureau of Statistics (CBS), ad-Dilli had a population of 1,271 in the 2004 census. Its inhabitants are predominantly Sunni Muslims.

== History ==
In 1596, it appeared in the Ottoman tax registers named Dali; part of the nahiya of Bani Kilab in the Hauran Sanjak. It had an entirely Muslim population consisting of 38 households and 15 bachelors. The villagers paid a fixed tax rate of 40% on various agricultural products, including wheat (3000 akçe), barley (1350), summer crops (250), goats and beehives (200), in addition to "occasional revenues" (300); a total of 5,300 akçe. 22/24 of the revenue went to a waqf.

== Religious buildings ==
- Al-Munir Mosque

== Bibliography ==
- Hütteroth, W.-D.; Abdulfattah, K. (1977). Historical Geography of Palestine, Transjordan and Southern Syria in the Late 16th Century. Erlanger Geographische Arbeiten, Sonderband 5. Erlangen, Germany: Vorstand der Fränkischen Geographischen Gesellschaft. ISBN 3-920405-41-2.
