= Rouzer, West Virginia =

- Unincorporated community
- Location within the state of West Virginia Rouzer (the United States)
- Coordinates: 38°27′58″N 81°11′31″W
- Country: United States
- State: West Virginia
- County: Clay
- Elevation: 732 ft (223 m)
- Time zone: UTC-5 (Eastern (EST))
  - Summer (DST): UTC-4 (EDT)
- GNIS ID: 1555533

Rouzer is an unincorporated community in Clay County, West Virginia, United States. It was also known as Shelley Junction.
