= Floe, West Virginia =

Unincorporated community in West Virginia, United States

- Unincorporated community
- Location within the state of West Virginia Floe (the United States)
- Coordinates: 38°38′38″N 81°0′44″W
- Country: United States
- State: West Virginia
- County: Clay
- Elevation: 1,043 ft (318 m)
- Time zone: UTC-5 (Eastern (EST))
  - Summer (DST): UTC-4 (EDT)
- ZIP code: 25235
- Area code: 304
- GNIS ID: 1554478

Floe is an unincorporated community in Clay County, West Virginia, United States. It was previously known as Walker.
