= O'Brion, West Virginia =

O'Brien, West Virginia
- Unincorporated community
- Location within the state of West Virginia O'Brien (the United States)
- Coordinates: 38°34′31″N 80°57′42″W
- Country: United States
- State: West Virginia
- County: Clay
- Elevation: 810 ft (250 m)
- Time zone: UTC-5 (Eastern (EST))
  - Summer (DST): UTC-4 (EDT)
- GNIS ID: 1549856

O'Brien is an unincorporated community in Clay County, West Virginia, United States.
