= Valley Fork, West Virginia =

Unincorporated community in West Virginia, US

Coordinates: 38°31′30″N 81°07′04″W

Valley Fork (also Valleyfork) is an unincorporated community in Clay County, West Virginia, United States. It lies at an elevation of 1,024 feet (312 m).
