= Porter, West Virginia =

- Unincorporated community
- Location within the state of West Virginia Porter (the United States)
- Coordinates: 38°29′00″N 81°15′21″W
- Country: United States
- State: West Virginia
- County: Clay
- Elevation: 633 ft (193 m)
- Time zone: UTC-5 (Eastern (EST))
  - Summer (DST): UTC-4 (EDT)
- GNIS ID: 1555392

Porter is an unincorporated community in Clay County, West Virginia, United States. Its post office is closed.
