= Little Italy, Clay County, West Virginia =

Little Italy, West Virginia
- Unincorporated community
- Location within West Virginia Location within the United States
- Coordinates: 38°31′21″N 81°02′00″W
- Country: United States
- State: West Virginia
- County: Clay
- Elevation: 787 ft (240 m)
- Time zone: UTC-5 (Eastern (EST))
  - Summer (DST): UTC-4 (EDT)
- Area codes: 304 & 681
- GNIS feature ID: 1554965

Little Italy is an unincorporated community in Clay County, West Virginia, United States. It lies at an elevation of 787 feet (240 m).

A large share of the early settlers being natives of Italy caused the name to be selected.
