= Ivydale, Clay County, West Virginia =

Ivydale, West Virginia
- Unincorporated community
- Location within West Virginia Location within the United States
- Coordinates: 38°32′08″N 81°02′05″W
- Country: United States
- State: West Virginia
- County: Clay
- Elevation: 761 ft (232 m)
- Time zone: UTC-5 (Eastern (EST))
  - Summer (DST): UTC-4 (EDT)
- ZIP code: 25110
- Area codes: 304 & 681
- GNIS feature ID: 1554789

Ivydale is an unincorporated community in Clay County, West Virginia, United States. Ivydale is located on the Elk River, 6 miles (9.7 km) northeast of Clay. Ivydale has a post office with ZIP code 25113. Ivydale is most notable as the birthplace of folk hero Harry R. Truman, who was killed during the Mount St. Helens eruption.
