= Independence, Clay County, West Virginia =

Independence, West Virginia
- Unincorporated community
- Location within the state of West Virginia Independence (the United States)
- Coordinates: 38°18′45″N 81°10′35″W
- Country: United States
- State: West Virginia
- County: Clay
- Time zone: UTC-5 (Eastern (EST))
  - Summer (DST): UTC-4 (EDT)
- GNIS feature ID: 1540660

Independence is an unincorporated community on Independence Mountain in Clay County, West Virginia, United States. It is located along West Virginia Route 16.
