= Hillsdale, Kanawha County, West Virginia =

Hillsdale, West Virginia
- Unincorporated community
- Location within West Virginia and the United States Hillsdale (the United States)
- Coordinates: 38°22′05″N 81°37′01″W
- Country: United States
- State: West Virginia
- County: Kanawha
- Time zone: UTC-5 (Eastern (EST))
  - Summer (DST): UTC-4 (EDT)

Hillsdale is a large community/residential area in Kanawha County, West Virginia, United States and is part of the Charleston area, but stretches past city limits. It can be accessed by Hillsdale Drive, Westmoreland Road (Interstate 77, exit #102), or Cora Street. It is surrounded by extensive woodlands, stretching to Eden's Fork (exit 106, near Kanawha Twomile Creek). This residential area is close to Charleston and takes up the entire hill.
