= Whetstone, West Virginia =

- Unincorporated community
- Location within West Virginia Location within the United States
- Coordinates: 38°30′6″N 81°3′20″W
- Country: United States
- State: West Virginia
- County: Clay
- Elevation: 741 ft (226 m)
- Time zone: UTC-5 (Eastern (EST))
  - Summer (DST): UTC-4 (EDT)
- GNIS feature ID: 1549001

Whetstone is an unincorporated community in Clay County, West Virginia, United States.
