= Jefferson, West Virginia =

- Census-designated place (CDP)
- Location in Kanawha County and state of West Virginia.
- Coordinates: 38°22′27″N 81°46′43″W
- Country: United States
- State: West Virginia
- County: Kanawha

Area
  - Total: 0.54 sq mi (1.4 km^{2})
  - Land: 0.35 sq mi (0.9 km^{2})
  - Water: 0.19 sq mi (0.5 km^{2})
- Elevation: 590 ft (180 m)

Population (2020)
  - Total: 527
  - Density: 1,769/sq mi (682.9/km^{2})
- Time zone: UTC-5 (Eastern (EST))
  - Summer (DST): UTC-4 (EDT)
- ZIP code: 25177
- Area code: 304
- FIPS code: 54-41010
- GNIS feature ID: 1802732

Jefferson is a census-designated place (CDP) in Kanawha County, West Virginia, United States, along the Kanawha River. The population was 527 at the 2020 census (down from 676 at the 2010 census). Jefferson was incorporated on March 22, 1997, but was disincorporated less than a decade later on February 21, 2007.

In January 2001, Jefferson was profiled on The Daily Show with Jon Stewart by faux reporter Stephen Colbert.

== Geography ==
Jefferson is located at 38°22′27″N 81°46′43″W (38.374102, -81.778726).

According to the United States Census Bureau, the CDP has a total area of 0.5 square miles (1.4 km^{2}); 0.3 square miles (0.9 km^{2}) of this is land, and 0.2 square miles (0.5 km^{2}) is water.

== Demographics ==
Historical population
Census	Pop.	Note	%±
2000	567		—
2010	676		19.2%
2020	527		−22.0%

As of the census of 2000, there were 567 people, 214 households, and 105 families residing in the former town. The population density was 1,768.6 inhabitants per square mile (684.1/km^{2}). There were 257 housing units at an average density of 801.6 per square mile (310.1/km^{2}). The racial makeup of the town was 81.48% White, 16.93% African American, 0.18% Native American, 0.18% from other races, and 1.23% from two or more races. Hispanic or Latino of any race were 0.53% of the population.

There were 214 households, out of which 23.8% had children under the age of 18 living with them, 28.0% were married couples living together, 17.3% had a female householder with no husband present, and 50.9% were non-families. 44.4% of all households were made up of individuals, and 11.2% had someone living alone who was 65 years of age or older. The average household size was 2.05 and the average family size was 2.81.

The age distribution was 16.4% under the age of 18, 10.1% from 18 to 24, 27.7% from 25 to 44, 22.6% from 45 to 64, and 23.3% who were 65 years of age or older. The median age was 42 years. For every 100 females, there were 97.6 males. For every 100 females age 18 and over, there were 91.9 males.

The median income for a household in the town was $16,384, and the median income for a family was $16,477. Males had a median income of $12,202 versus $16,042 for females. The per capita income for the town was $8,746. About 43.5% of families and 51.6% of the population were below the poverty line, including 74.7% of those under age 18 and 41.5% of those age 65 or over.
