= WYAP-LP =

- Clay, West Virginia; United States
- Frequency: 101.7 MHz
- Branding: Yap Radio

Programming
- Format: Variety
- Affiliations: Pacifica Radio Network; Public Radio Exchange

Ownership
- Owner: Clay County Communications, Ltd.

History
- First air date: September 8, 2004
- Call sign meaning: Yap is another word for "talk"

Technical information
- Licensing authority: FCC
- Facility ID: 133896
- Class: L1
- ERP: 100 watts
- HAAT: −60 meters (−200 ft)
- Transmitter coordinates: 38°28′32.0″N 81°5′3.0″W

Links
- Public license information: LMS
- Website: www.wyap.com

WYAP-LP is a Variety formatted radio station licensed to Clay, West Virginia. WYAP-LP is owned and operated by Clay County Communications, Ltd.

== See also ==
- List of community radio stations in the United States
