= Swandale, West Virginia =

- Unincorporated community
- Location within the state of West Virginia Swandale (the United States)
- Coordinates: 38°28′14″N 80°57′34″W
- Country: United States
- State: West Virginia
- County: Clay
- Elevation: 879 ft (268 m)
- Time zone: UTC-5 (Eastern (EST))
  - Summer (DST): UTC-4 (EDT)
- GNIS ID: 1555764

Swandale is an unincorporated community and coal town in Clay County, West Virginia, United States.

The community most likely was named after the local Swan family.
