= List of United States metropolitan areas by per capita income =

Metropolitan areas ranked by income

The followings lists sort metropolitan statistical areas in the United States by per capita income.

== U.S. Bureau of Economic Analysis ==
Larger US metro areas by historical development of per capita personal income in current US dollars.

Metropolitan statistical area	2022	2020	2010	2000	1990	1980	1970
San Jose-Sunnyvale-Santa Clara, CA	141,516	122,544	60,111	53,212	25,446	13,272	5,079
Bridgeport-Stamford-Norwalk, CT	125,185	115,859	102,572	61,662	33,700	14,988	6,130
San Francisco-Oakland-Hayward, CA	123,736	107,815	60,501	49,049	26,623	13,972	5,713
Boston-Cambridge-Newton, MA-NH	94,082	84,684	57,744	42,332	24,714	11,135	4,770
Seattle-Tacoma-Bellevue, WA	92,113	81,785	48,456	38,641	22,825	12,270	4,758
Denver-Aurora-Lakewood, CO	84,788	71,515	42,948	37,919	21,972	12,219	4,758
New York-Newark-Jersey City, NY-NJ-PA	84,084	76,868	54,062	40,800	26,616	12,021	5,290
Washington-Arlington-Alexandria, DC-VA-MD-WV	83,010	75,141	58,370	42,368	26,941	13,709	5,806
Miami-Fort Lauderdale-West Palm Beach, FL	77,732	64,949	43,094	32,290	22,175	11,463	4,755
Los Angeles-Long Beach-Anaheim, CA	76,445	69,362	44,169	31,776	22,236	12,199	5,062
Minneapolis-St. Paul-Bloomington, MN-WI	75,164	66,431	46,226	36,987	22,589	11,680	4,711
Austin-Round Rock, TX	75,119	64,453	41,042	33,077	18,243	9,632	3,672
Philadelphia-Camden-Wilmington PA-NJ-DE-MD	74,485	67,725	48,174	35,179	22,267	10,890	4,599
San Diego-Carlsbad, CA	74,326	67,536	43,889	33,680	21,000	11,562	5,140
Nashville-Davidson-Murfreesboro-Franklin, TN	74,035	63,891	42,071	31,918	18,586	9,088	3,629
Chicago-Naperville-Elgin, IL-IN-WI	72,512	65,862	44,319	35,946	22,627	11,698	4,945
Baltimore-Columbia-Towson, MD	71,420	65,676	48,203	34,530	22,024	11,181	4,497
Raleigh, NC	70,628	61,360	43,418	34,180	21,088	9,629	3,750
Dallas-Fort Worth-Arlington, TX	70,493	61,681	41,657	33,798	20,663	11,355	4,335
Hartford-West Hartford-East Hartford, CT	69,787	66,219	50,090	37,897	25,164	11,932	4,983
St. Louis, MO-IL	69,698	61,190	42,571	31,865	20,586	10,514	4,365
Portland-Vancouver-Hillsboro, OR-WA	69,435	62,550	39,646	32,268	20,238	11,225	4,460
Indianapolis-Carmel-Anderson, IN	68,719	60,412	41,593	32,729	20,130	10,282	4,164
Omaha-Council Bluffs, NE-IA	68,586	59,897	45,186	32,757	19,918	10,442	4,275
Houston-The Woodlands-Sugar Land, TX	68,344	59,674	45,627	33,254	20,076	12,087	4,240
Richmond, VA	68,205	61,305	42,736	32,317	21,736	10,706	4,039
Milwaukee-Waukesha-West Allis, WI	68,155	60,530	43,647	33,610	20,917	11,360	4,570
Sacramento-Roseville-Arden-Arcade, CA	66,940	61,712	40,802	31,403	20,391	11,230	4,761
Pittsburgh, PA	65,792	61,414	42,763	30,695	19,481	10,430	4,091
Cincinnati, OH-KY-IN	65,253	58,803	39,883	30,893	19,556	9,973	4,095
Charlotte-Concord-Gastonia, NC-SC	65,156	58,149	38,793	30,476	18,920	8,292	3,585
Salt Lake City, UT	65,085	56,393	35,696	27,500	16,467	9,243	3,908
Urban Honolulu, HI	64,936	60,273	44,945	31,260	23,895	12,340	5,828
Atlanta-Sandy Springs-Roswell, GA	64,107	58,140	38,666	33,861	20,624	10,102	4,133
Providence-Warwick, RI-MA	63,746	59,500	41,924	29,798	19,696	9,691	4,165
Kansas City, MO-KS	63,417	57,427	41,371	32,030	19,895	10,814	4,346
Cleveland-Elyria, OH	62,921	56,884	39,702	31,748	21,524	11,195	4,631
Birmingham-Hoover, AL	62,262	54,817	39,422	29,499	18,233	9,125	3,468
Phoenix-Mesa-Scottsdale, AZ	61,840	54,747	35,092	28,901	18,878	10,484	4,225
New Orleans-Metairie, LA	61,801	56,248	42,926	27,159	17,540	9,916	3,750
Louisville/Jefferson County, KY-IN	61,490	54,631	37,825	30,253	18,907	9,529	3,972
Detroit-Warren-Dearborn, MI	61,322	56,901	38,240	34,525	21,295	11,252	4,612
Columbus, OH	61,228	55,902	38,682	30,863	19,241	9,765	4,061
Oklahoma City, OK	60,687	53,642	39,411	26,601	17,504	10,949	4,144
Tampa-St. Petersburg-Clearwater, FL	60,091	53,629	38,780	29,223	18,985	9,789	3,875
Las Vegas-Henderson-Paradise, NV	59,150	52,562	35,707	31,007	19,957	11,422	5,176
Virginia Beach-Norfolk-Newport News, VA-NC	57,873	52,283	40,417	28,001	18,748	10,169	4,172
Memphis, TN-MS-AR	56,440	51,325	37,012	29,527	17,983	9,165	3,521
Buffalo-Cheektowaga-Niagara Falls, NY	56,414	54,208	38,394	28,227	19,365	9,962	4,194
San Antonio-New Braunfels, TX	55,180	50,165	36,557	26,954	16,458	9,169	3,847
Orlando-Kissimmee-Sanford, FL	53,959	47,705	33,600	27,631	18,566	9,743	3,959
Riverside-San Bernardino-Ontario, CA	50,407	47,177	30,231	23,508	17,930	10,285	4,294

== Census 2010 ==
Figures are from the 2010 United States census.

Rank	Metropolitan statistical area	Population	Per capita income
1	Washington-Arlington-Alexandria, D.C-Virginia-Maryland MSA	5,949,178	$47,411
2	San Jose-Santa Clara-Sunnyvale, California MSA	1,918,944	$40,392
3	Seattle-Tacoma-Bellevue, Washington MSA	3,611,644	$39,322
4	San Francisco-Oakland-Hayward, California MSA	4,122,177	$38,355
5	Boston–Worcester–Lawrence, Massachusetts–New Hampshire–Maine–Connecticut CMSA	5,819,100	$37,311
6	Honolulu, Hawaii MSA	921,000	$36,339
7	Minneapolis-St. Paul-Bloomington, Minnesota MSA	3,478,415	$35,388
8	Hartford, Connecticut MSA	1,183,110	$34,310
9	Denver-Aurora-Lakewood, Colorado MSA	2,871,068	$32,399
10	Portland-Vancouver-Hillsboro, Oregon MSA	2,345,318	$31,377
11	Sarasota–Bradenton, Florida MSA	589,959	$30,344
12	Anchorage, Alaska MSA	260,283	$30,129
13	Baltimore-Towson, Maryland MSA	2,700,000	$29,771
14	New York-Newark-White Plains, New York-New Jersey-Connecticut CMSA	19,278,198	$28,819
15	Atlanta, Georgia MSA	5,544,577	$25,288
16	Madison, Wisconsin MSA	726,526	$25,163
17	Rochester, Minnesota MSA	124,277	$24,939
18	Santa Fe, New Mexico MSA	147,635	$24,745
19	Raleigh–Durham–Chapel Hill, North Carolina MSA	1,187,941	$24,698
20	Fort Myers–Cape Coral, Florida MSA	440,888	$24,542
21	Austin–San Marcos, Texas MSA	2,271,214	$24,516
22	Salt Lake City-Addison-Blue Spring, Utah MSA	1,333,666	$24,277
23	Cleveland-Elyria-Akron, Ohio MSA	3,554,127	$24,275
24	Norwich–New London, Connecticut MSA	293,566	$24,225
25	Portland, Maine MSA	243,537	$24,132
26	Nashville-Davidson-Murfreesboro, Tennessee MSA	1,789,712	$23,994
27	Fort Collins–Loveland, Colorado MSA	251,494	$23,689
28	Richmond–Petersburg, Virginia MSA	996,512	$23,685
29	Dallas–Fort Worth, Texas CMSA	8,500,000	$23,616
30	Charlottesville, Virginia MSA	159,576	$23,533
31	Charlotte–Gastonia–Rock Hill, North Carolina–South Carolina MSA	2,335,440	$23,417
32	Kansas City, Missouri–Kansas MSA	2,053,167	$23,326
33	Des Moines, Iowa MSA	456,022	$23,316
34	Indianapolis, Indiana MSA	1,999,935	$23,198
35	Springfield, Illinois MSA	201,437	$23,074
36	Fort Pierce–Port St. Lucie, Florida MSA	319,426	$23,072
37	Santa Barbara–Santa Maria–Lompoc, California MSA	399,347	$23,059
38	Columbus, Ohio MSA	1,987,911	$23,020
39	Milwaukee–Racine, Wisconsin CMSA	2,240,231	$23,003
40	Cedar Rapids, Iowa MSA	191,701	$22,977
41	Cincinnati–Hamilton, Ohio–Kentucky–Indiana CMSA	2,435,418	$22,947
42	San Diego, California MSA	3,926,941	$22,926
43	Philadelphia-Camden-Atlantic City, Pennsylvania-Delaware-New Jersey MSA	6,138,144	$22,874
44	Burlington, Vermont MSA	169,391	$22,732
45	St. Louis, Missouri–Illinois MSA	2,603,607	$22,698
46	Reno, Nevada MSA	312,000	$22,592
47	Detroit-Flint-Ann Arbor, Michigan MSA	5,270,909	$22,319
48	Albany–Schenectady–Troy, New York MSA	875,583	$22,303
49	Sacramento–Yolo, California CMSA	1,796,857	$22,302
50	Bloomington–Normal, Illinois MSA	150,433	$22,227
51	Iowa City, Iowa MSA	111,006	$22,220
52	Omaha, Nebraska–Iowa MSA	716,998	$22,145
53	Wilmington, North Carolina MSA	233,450	$22,100
54	Huntsville, Alabama MSA	342,376	$22,073
55	Kokomo, Indiana MSA	101,541	$22,029
56	Colorado Springs, Colorado MSA	516,929	$22,005
57	Boulder-Greeley Colorado, MSA	714,000	$22,004
58	Harrisburg–Lebanon–Carlisle, Pennsylvania MSA	629,401	$21,936
59	Phoenix–Mesa, Arizona MSA	3,251,876	$21,907
60	Corvallis, Oregon MSA	78,153	$21,868
61	San Luis Obispo–Atascadero–Paso Robles, California MSA	246,681	$21,864
62	Appleton–Oshkosh–Neenah, Wisconsin MSA	358,365	$21,837
63	Punta Gorda, Florida MSA	141,627	$21,806
64	Green Bay, Wisconsin MSA	226,778	$21,784
65	Tampa–St. Petersburg–Clearwater, Florida MSA	2,395,997	$21,784
66	Jacksonville, Florida MSA	1,100,491	$21,763
67	Louisville, Kentucky–Indiana MSA	1,025,598	$21,756
68	Houston–Galveston–Brazoria, Texas CMSA	4,669,571	$21,701
69	Lansing–East Lansing, Michigan MSA	447,728	$21,653
70	Binghamton, New York MSA	1,098,201	$21,627
71	Dayton–Springfield, Ohio MSA	950,558	$21,598
72	Sheboygan, Wisconsin MSA	112,646	$21,509
73	Melbourne–Titusville–Palm Bay, Florida MSA	476,230	$21,484
74	Birmingham, Alabama MSA	921,106	$21,410
75	Peoria–Pekin, Illinois MSA	347,387	$21,402
76	Greensboro–Winston-Salem–High Point, North Carolina MSA	1,251,509	$21,392
77	Roanoke, Virginia MSA	235,932	$21,366
78	Lincoln, Nebraska MSA	250,291	$21,265
79	Pittsfield, Massachusetts MSA	84,699	$21,258
80	Allentown–Bethlehem–Easton, Pennsylvania MSA	637,958	$21,243
81	Lexington, Kentucky MSA	479,198	$21,237
82	Orlando, Florida MSA	1,644,561	$21,232
83	Reading, Pennsylvania MSA	373,638	$21,232
84	Las Vegas, Nevada–Arizona MSA	1,563,282	$21,210
85	Providence–Fall River–Warwick, Rhode Island MSA	1,188,613	$21,208
86	Los Angeles–Riverside–Orange County, California CMSA	16,373,645	$21,170
87	Rockford, Illinois MSA	371,236	$21,145
88	York, Pennsylvania MSA	381,751	$21,086
89	Sioux Falls, South Dakota MSA	172,412	$20,936
90	Pittsburgh, Pennsylvania MSA	2,358,695	$20,935
91	Fort Walton Beach, Florida MSA	170,498	$20,918
92	Topeka, Kansas MSA	169,871	$20,904
93	Columbia, South Carolina MSA	536,691	$20,902
94	Grand Rapids–Muskegon–Holland, Michigan MSA	1,088,514	$20,901
95	Janesville–Beloit, Wisconsin MSA	152,307	$20,895
96	Savannah, Georgia MSA	293,000	$20,752
97	Wausau, Wisconsin MSA	125,834	$20,703
98	Fort Wayne, Indiana MSA	502,141	$20,701
99	Wichita, Kansas MSA	545,220	$20,692
100	Toledo, Ohio MSA	618,203	$20,565
101	Knoxville, Tennessee MSA	687,249	$20,538
102	Davenport–Moline–Rock Island, Iowa–Illinois MSA	359,062	$20,464
103	Miami–Fort Lauderdale-West Palm Beach, Florida CMSA	3,876,380	$20,454
104	Evansville–Henderson, Indiana–Kentucky MSA	296,195	$20,439
105	Lancaster, Pennsylvania MSA	470,658	$20,398
106	Charleston, West Virginia MSA	251,662	$20,378
107	Norfolk–Virginia Beach–Newport News, Virginia–North Carolina MSA	1,569,541	$20,328
108	Memphis, Tennessee–Arkansas–Mississippi MSA	1,135,614	$20,327
109	Kalamazoo–Battle Creek, Michigan MSA	452,851	$20,324
110	Saginaw–Bay City–Midland, Michigan MSA	403,070	$20,320
111	Boise City, Idaho MSA	432,345	$20,280
112	Little Rock–North Little Rock, Arkansas MSA	724,294	$20,263
113	Elkhart–Goshen, Indiana MSA	182,791	$20,250
114	Jackson, Michigan MSA	158,422	$20,171
115	Salinas, California MSA	401,762	$20,165
116	Canton–Massillon, Ohio MSA	406,934	$20,154
117	Buffalo–Niagara Falls, New York MSA	1,170,111	$20,143
118	Tulsa, Oklahoma MSA	803,235	$20,092
119	Decatur, Illinois MSA	114,706	$20,067
120	Albuquerque, New Mexico MSA	712,738	$20,025
121	Bellingham, Washington MSA	166,814	$20,025
122	Asheville, North Carolina MSA	225,965	$20,010
123	Syracuse, New York MSA	732,117	$20,002
124	Tallahassee, Florida MSA	284,539	$19,990
125	Springfield, Massachusetts MSA	591,932	$19,976
126	Benton Harbor, Michigan MSA	162,453	$19,952
127	Lawrence, Kansas MSA	99,962	$19,952
128	Myrtle Beach, South Carolina MSA	196,629	$19,949
129	Chattanooga, Tennessee–Georgia MSA	465,161	$19,944
130	Fargo–Moorhead, North Dakota–Minnesota MSA	174,367	$19,910
131	Daytona Beach, Florida MSA	493,175	$19,888
132	Columbia, Missouri MSA	135,454	$19,844
133	Richland–Kennewick–Pasco, Washington MSA	191,822	$19,798
134	Tucson, Arizona MSA	843,746	$19,785
135	Ogden, Utah MSA	211,277	$19,781
136	Charleston–North Charleston, South Carolina MSA	549,033	$19,772
137	South Bend, Indiana MSA	265,559	$19,756
138	Greenville–Spartanburg–Anderson, South Carolina MSA	962,441	$19,716
139	Champaign–Urbana, Illinois MSA	179,669	$19,708
140	Eugene–Springfield, Oregon MSA	322,959	$19,681
141	La Crosse, Wisconsin–Minnesota MSA	126,838	$19,649
142	Cheyenne, Wyoming MSA	81,607	$19,634
143	Dubuque, Iowa MSA	89,143	$19,600
144	Bismarck, North Dakota MSA	94,719	$19,572
145	Medford–Ashland, Oregon MSA	181,269	$19,498
146	Jackson, Mississippi MSA	440,801	$19,435
147	Glens Falls, New York MSA	124,345	$19,368
148	Oklahoma City, Oklahoma MSA	1,083,346	$19,366
149	Billings, Montana MSA	129,352	$19,303
150	Muncie, Indiana MSA	118,769	$19,233
151	Spokane, Washington MSA	417,939	$19,233
152	Bangor, Maine MSA	90,864	$19,194
153	St. Cloud, Minnesota MSA	167,392	$19,170
154	Lafayette, Indiana MSA	182,821	$19,095
155	Tyler, Texas MSA	174,706	$19,072
156	Rochester, New York MSA	1,079,671	$19,067
157	Pensacola, Florida MSA	412,153	$19,054
158	Tuscaloosa, Alabama MSA	164,875	$18,998
159	Rapid City, South Dakota MSA	88,565	$18,938
160	Casper, Wyoming MSA	66,533	$18,913
161	Montgomery, Alabama MSA	333,055	$18,910
162	Lynchburg, Virginia MSA	214,911	$18,887
163	Waterloo–Cedar Falls, Iowa MSA	128,012	$18,885
164	Eau Claire, Wisconsin MSA	148,337	$18,875
165	Baton Rouge, Louisiana MSA	602,894	$18,867
166	Jackson, Tennessee MSA	107,377	$18,863
167	Sherman–Denison, Texas MSA	110,595	$18,862
168	Lewiston–Auburn, Maine MSA	90,830	$18,848
169	Macon, Georgia MSA	322,549	$18,840
170	New Orleans, Louisiana MSA	1,337,726	$18,834
171	Augusta–Aiken, Georgia–South Carolina MSA	477,441	$18,744
172	Duluth–Superior, Minnesota–Wisconsin MSA	243,815	$18,743
173	Owensboro, Kentucky MSA	91,545	$18,739
174	Hickory–Morganton–Lenoir, North Carolina MSA	341,851	$18,723
175	Grand Junction, Colorado MSA	116,255	$18,715
176	Panama City, Florida MSA	148,217	$18,700
177	Dover, Delaware MSA	126,697	$18,662
178	Springfield, Missouri MSA	325,721	$18,611
179	Decatur, Alabama MSA	145,867	$18,577
180	Youngstown–Warren, Ohio MSA	594,746	$18,551
181	Bloomington, Indiana MSA	120,563	$18,534
182	San Antonio, Texas MSA	1,592,383	$18,518
183	Gainesville, Florida MSA	217,955	$18,465
184	Victoria, Texas MSA	84,088	$18,379
185	Fayetteville–Springdale–Rogers, Arkansas MSA	311,121	$18,348
186	Sioux City, Iowa–Nebraska MSA	124,130	$18,339
187	Athens, Georgia MSA	153,444	$18,303
188	Lakeland–Winter Haven, Florida MSA	483,924	$18,302
189	Mansfield, Ohio MSA	175,818	$18,284
190	Elmira, New York MSA	91,070	$18,264
191	Amarillo, Texas MSA	217,858	$18,247
192	Greenville, North Carolina MSA	133,798	$18,243
193	Scranton–Wilkes-Barre–Hazleton, Pennsylvania MSA	624,776	$18,229
194	Florence, Alabama MSA	142,950	$18,205
195	Lima, Ohio MSA	155,084	$18,137
196	Mobile, Alabama MSA	540,258	$18,126
197	St. Joseph, Missouri MSA	102,490	$18,123
198	Parkersburg–Marietta, West Virginia–Ohio MSA	151,237	$18,076
199	State College, Pennsylvania MSA	135,758	$18,020
200	Utica–Rome, New York MSA	299,896	$18,006
201	Erie, Pennsylvania MSA	280,843	$17,932
202	Biloxi–Gulfport–Pascagoula, Mississippi MSA	363,988	$17,899
203	Florence, South Carolina MSA	125,761	$17,876
204	Ocala, Florida MSA	258,916	$17,848
205	Missoula, Montana MSA	95,802	$17,808
206	Johnson City–Kingsport–Bristol, Tennessee–Virginia MSA	480,091	$17,800
207	Dothan, Alabama MSA	137,916	$17,780
208	Redding, California MSA	163,256	$17,738
209	Lake Charles, Louisiana MSA	183,577	$17,710
210	Grand Forks, North Dakota–Minnesota MSA	97,478	$17,679
211	Odessa–Midland, Texas MSA	237,132	$17,642
212	Sharon, Pennsylvania MSA	120,293	$17,636
213	Shreveport–Bossier City, Louisiana MSA	392,302	$17,628
214	Beaumont–Port Arthur, Texas MSA	385,090	$17,616
215	Longview–Marshall, Texas MSA	208,780	$17,576
216	Great Falls, Montana MSA	80,357	$17,566
217	Columbus, Georgia–Alabama MSA	274,624	$17,559
218	Chico–Paradise, California MSA	203,171	$17,517
219	Terre Haute, Indiana MSA	149,192	$17,504
220	Enid, Oklahoma MSA	57,813	$17,457
221	Fayetteville, North Carolina MSA	302,963	$17,376
222	Anniston, Alabama MSA	112,249	$17,367
223	Stockton–Lodi, California MSA	563,598	$17,365
224	San Angelo, Texas MSA	104,010	$17,325
225	Lubbock, Texas MSA	242,628	$17,323
226	Albany, Georgia MSA	120,822	$17,312
227	Williamsport, Pennsylvania MSA	120,044	$17,224
228	Abilene, Texas MSA	126,555	$17,176
229	Waco, Texas MSA	213,517	$17,174
230	Pueblo, Colorado MSA	141,472	$17,163
231	Auburn–Opelika, Alabama MSA	115,092	$17,158
232	Pocatello, Idaho MSA	75,565	$17,148
233	Rocky Mount, North Carolina MSA	143,026	$17,142
234	Wichita Falls, Texas MSA	140,518	$17,113
235	Jonesboro, Arkansas MSA	82,148	$17,091
236	Monroe, Louisiana MSA	147,250	$17,084
237	Texarkana, Texas–Texarkana, Arkansas MSA	129,749	$17,072
238	Danville, Virginia MSA	110,156	$17,061
239	Flagstaff, Arizona–Utah MSA	122,366	$17,056
240	Goldsboro, North Carolina MSA	113,329	$17,010
241	Modesto, California MSA	446,997	$16,913
242	Steubenville–Weirton, Ohio–West Virginia MSA	132,008	$16,911
243	Jamestown, New York MSA	139,750	$16,840
244	Gadsden, Alabama MSA	103,459	$16,783
245	Corpus Christi, Texas MSA	380,783	$16,752
246	Wheeling, West Virginia–Ohio MSA	153,172	$16,748
247	Altoona, Pennsylvania MSA	129,144	$16,743
248	Joplin, Missouri MSA	157,322	$16,653
249	Fort Smith, Arkansas–Oklahoma MSA	207,290	$16,604
250	Killeen–Temple, Texas MSA	312,952	$16,546
251	Hattiesburg, Mississippi MSA	111,674	$16,450
252	Cumberland, Maryland-West Virginia MSA	102,008	$16,409
253	Huntington–Ashland, West Virginia–Kentucky–Ohio MSA	315,538	$16,357
254	Clarksville–Hopkinsville, Tennessee–Kentucky MSA	207,033	$16,339
255	Bryan–College Station, Texas MSA	152,415	$16,212
256	Alexandria, Louisiana MSA	126,337	$16,088
257	Lafayette, Louisiana MSA	385,647	$16,072
258	Yuba City, California MSA	139,149	$15,998
259	Houma, Louisiana MSA	194,477	$15,939
260	Bakersfield, California MSA	661,645	$15,760
261	Johnstown, Pennsylvania MSA	232,621	$15,755
262	Lawton, Oklahoma MSA	114,996	$15,728
263	Sumter, South Carolina MSA	104,646	$15,657
264	Yakima, Washington MSA	222,581	$15,606
265	Provo–Orem, Utah MSA	368,536	$15,557
266	Pine Bluff, Arkansas MSA	84,278	$15,417
267	Fresno, California MSA	922,516	$15,386
268	Jacksonville, North Carolina MSA	150,355	$14,853
269	Yuma, Arizona MSA	160,026	$14,802
270	Merced, California MSA	210,554	$14,257
271	Visalia–Tulare–Porterville, California MSA	368,021	$14,006
272	Las Cruces, New Mexico MSA	174,682	$13,999
273	El Paso, Texas MSA	679,622	$13,421
274	Brownsville–Harlingen–San Benito, Texas MSA	335,227	$10,960
275	Laredo, Texas MSA	193,117	$10,759
276	McAllen–Edinburg–Mission, Texas MSA	569,463	$9,899
277	San Juan–Caguas–Arecibo, Puerto Rico CMSA	2,450,292	$9,140
278	Mayagüez, Puerto Rico MSA	253,347	$7,730
279	Ponce, Puerto Rico MSA	361,094	$6,530
280	Aguadilla, Puerto Rico MSA	146,424	$6,378

== See also ==
- Highest-income states in the United States
- Highest-income census metropolitan areas in Canada
