= Two Run, Clay County, West Virginia =

Two Run, West Virginia
- Unincorporated community
- Location within the state of West Virginia Two Run (the United States)
- Coordinates: 38°28′29″N 81°4′54″W
- Country: United States
- State: West Virginia
- County: Clay
- Elevation: 692 ft (211 m)
- Time zone: UTC-5 (Eastern (EST))
  - Summer (DST): UTC-4 (EDT)
- ZIP codes: 26160
- GNIS ID: 1741429

Two Run is an unincorporated community in Clay County, West Virginia, United States. It is located along Palestine Road, and is approximately 60 miles northeast of Charleston.
