= Adonijah, West Virginia =

Unincorporated community in West Virginia, United States

- Unincorporated community
- Location within the state of West Virginia Adonijah (the United States)
- Coordinates: 38°20′2″N 81°11′40″W
- Country: United States
- State: West Virginia
- County: Clay
- Elevation: 1,056 ft (322 m)
- Time zone: UTC-5 (Eastern (EST))
  - Summer (DST): UTC-4 (EDT)
- GNIS ID: 1741378

Adonijah is an unincorporated community in Clay County, West Virginia, United States. Adonijah is located at the confluence of the Laurel Fork and Adonijah Fork.
