= Mink Shoals, West Virginia =

- Unincorporated community
- Location within West Virginia and the United States Mink Shoals (the United States)
- Coordinates: 38°23′22″N 81°35′5″W
- Country: United States
- State: West Virginia
- County: Kanawha
- Time zone: UTC-5 (Eastern (EST))
  - Summer (DST): UTC-4 (EDT)
- ZIP codes-: 25302
- Area code: 304

Mink Shoals is an unincorporated community along U.S. Route 119 in Kanawha County, West Virginia, United States and can be accessed by Interstate 79, Exit 1. It is located on the Elk River and has a public access site of the Elk River. Its rural-like feel attracts many residents, although it is only slightly over two miles from the Charleston city limits. It is located at an altitude of 571 feet (174 m). It also has an elementary school, Shoals Elementary.

== History ==
Mink Shoals' first resident was Felix Mayer. Felix was born in Wertenberg, Germany on August 17, 1829. Felix married Dorothy Ryder and cleared a farm along what is now the Dutch Road area, which became one of the most successful in the county. Among Felix and Dorothy's sons were George and Frank Mayer. Frank was born in 1860 and was a prominent figure in Kanawha County. All of these people are buried in a private family cemetery on Dutch Road.
