= Dille, West Virginia =

- Unincorporated community
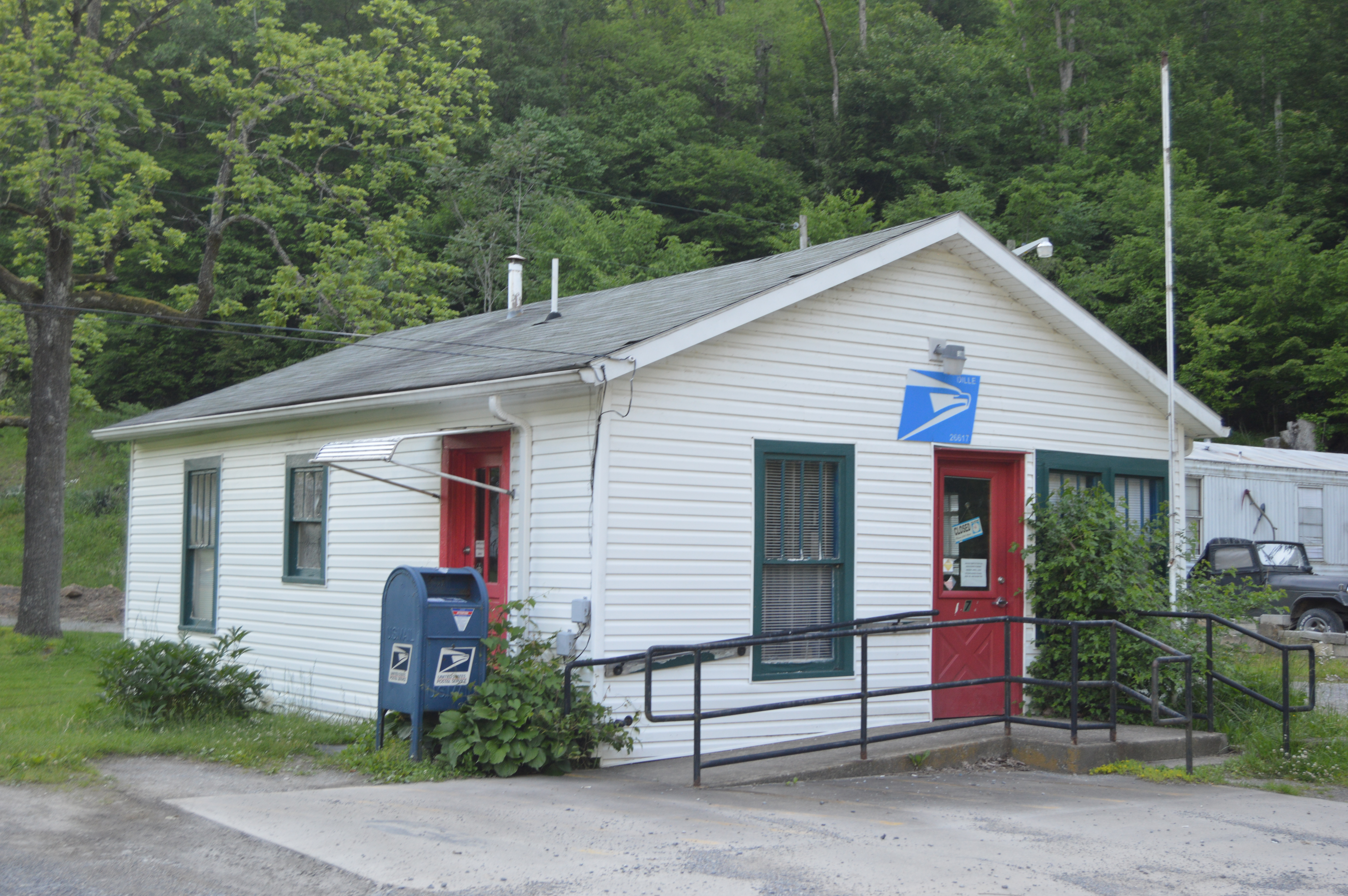
- Post office

- Location within the state of West Virginia Dille (the United States)
- Coordinates: 38°29′20″N 80°49′32″W
- Country: United States
- State: West Virginia
- County: Clay
- Elevation: 1,201 ft (366 m)
- Time zone: UTC-5 (Eastern (EST))
  - Summer (DST): UTC-4 (EDT)
- ZIP codes: 26617
- GNIS ID: 1538188

Dille is an unincorporated community in Clay County, West Virginia, United States.
