= Clay, West Virginia =

- Town
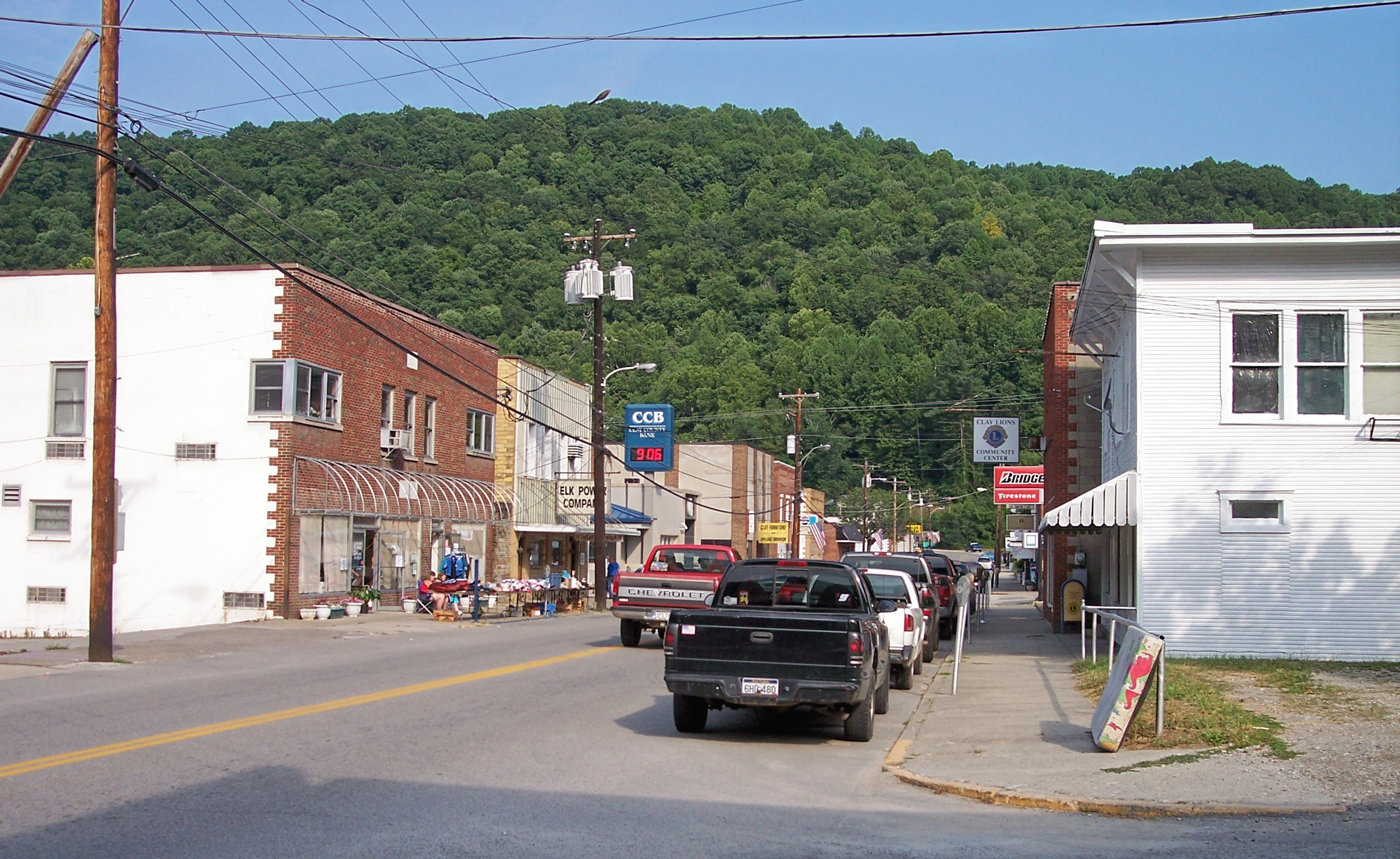
- Main Street (WV Route 16) in Clay; Photo 2007
- Nickname: Haven In The Hills
- Interactive map of Clay, West Virginia
- Location within West Virginia Location within the United States
- Coordinates: 38°27′46″N 81°4′48″W
- Country: United States
- State: West Virginia
- County: Clay

Area
  - Total: 0.61 sq mi (1.59 km^{2})
  - Land: 0.56 sq mi (1.44 km^{2})
  - Water: 0.058 sq mi (0.15 km^{2})
- Elevation: 709 ft (216 m)

Population (2020)
  - Total: 396
  - Estimate (2021): 387
  - Density: 790.6/sq mi (305.26/km^{2})
- Time zone: UTC-5 (Eastern (EST))
  - Summer (DST): UTC-4 (EDT)
- ZIP code: 25043
- Area code: 304
- FIPS code: 54-15676
- GNIS feature ID: 1537360

Clay is a town in and the county seat of Clay County, West Virginia, United States. The population was 399 at the 2020 census. It is the only incorporated town in Clay County.

== History ==
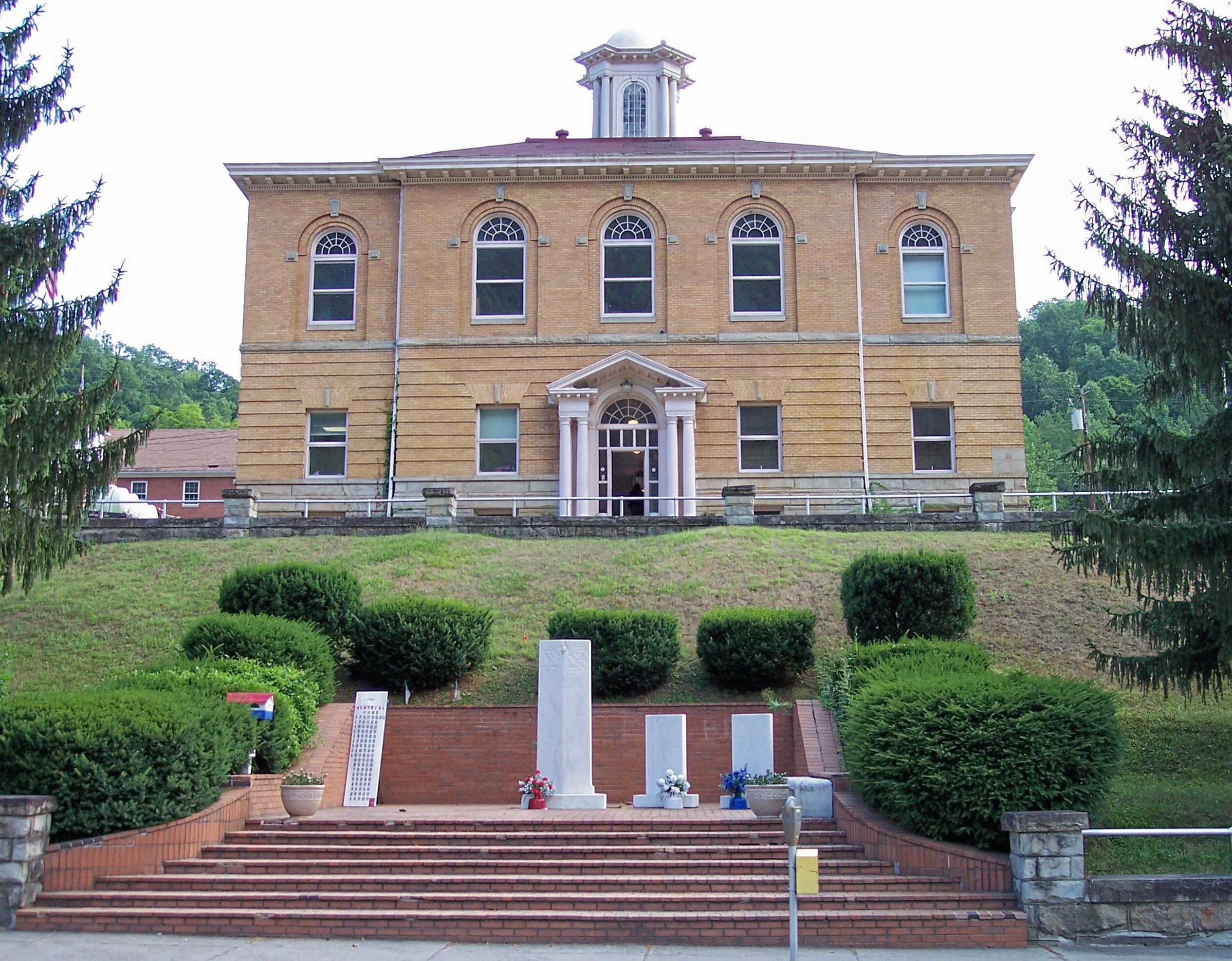
The Old Clay County Courthouse in 2007

Clay was established on the site of a farm that was the site of Clay County's first court meeting following the county's establishment in 1858. The community was initially known by the name of "Marshall," then briefly as "Henry," and then as "Clay Courthouse" and finally Clay. The town and county are both named for U.S. Senator and Secretary of State Henry Clay (1777–1852). The town was incorporated in 1895. Before 1880, Clay was inaccessible to traffic from horse-drawn vehicles, and the Elk River was its primary mode of transport. Expansion of the Coal and Coke Railway reached Clay in 1905.

In June 2016, the town was impacted by severe flooding from the Elk River.

In November 2016, Clay mayor Beverly Whaling approvingly responded to a social media post that referred to U.S. First Lady Michelle Obama as an "ape in heels". Following international media coverage of the incident, Whaling resigned.

== Geography ==
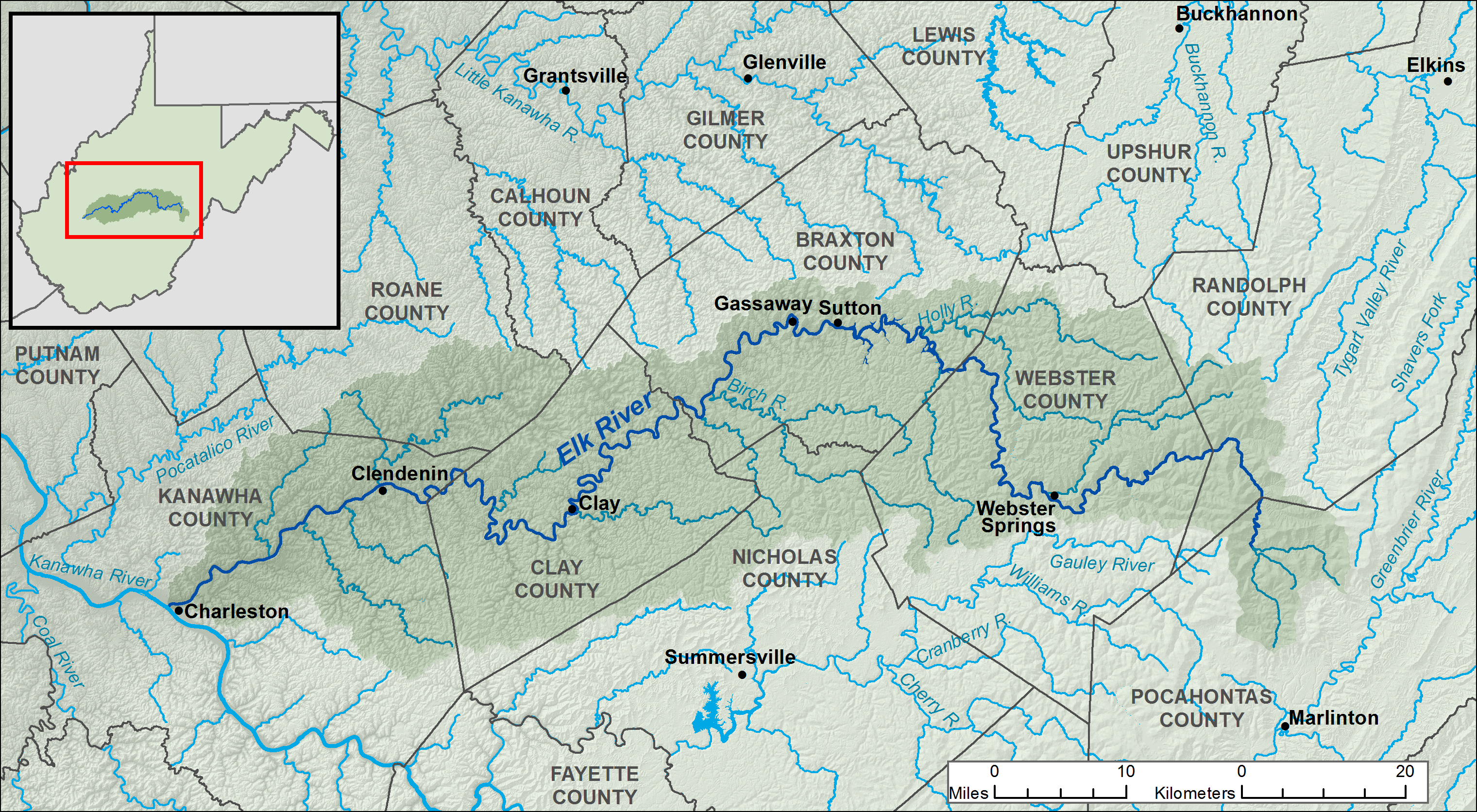
Elk River watershed

The city of Charleston, the state capitol, is approximately 40 miles (64 km) from Clay to the southwest. Clay is centrally located within Clay County at 38°27′46″N 81°4′48″W (38.462855, -81.080024), along the Elk River and West Virginia Route 16 at an elevation of 708 feet (216 m). West Virginia Route 4 overlaps with Route 16 in the north of Clay. There is not much bottom land in Clay, as the river cuts a deep gorge through the city, limiting growth.

According to the United States Census Bureau, the town has a total area of 0.62 square miles (1.61 km^{2}), of which 0.56 square miles (1.45 km^{2}) is land and 0.06 square miles (0.16 km^{2}) is water.

=== Climate ===
The climate in this area is characterized by hot, humid summers and generally mild to cool winters. According to the Köppen Climate Classification system, Clay has a humid subtropical climate, abbreviated "Cfa" on climate maps.

== Demographics ==
Historical population
Census	Pop.	Note	%±
1900	339		—
1910	392		15.6%
1920	342		−12.8%
1930	444		29.8%
1940	511		15.1%
1950	500		−2.2%
1960	486		−2.8%
1970	479		−1.4%
1980	940		96.2%
1990	592		−37.0%
2000	593		0.2%
2010	491		−17.2%
2020	396		−19.3%
2021 (est.)	387	▼	−2.3%
U.S. Decennial Census

=== 2010 census ===
As of the census of 2010, there were 491 people, 218 households, and 134 families living in the town. The population density was 876.8 inhabitants per square mile (338.5/km^{2}). There were 275 housing units at an average density of 491.1 per square mile (189.6/km^{2}). The racial makeup of the town was 97.8% White, 0.2% Native American, 0.2% from other races, and 1.8% from two or more races. Hispanic or Latino of any race were 0.4% of the population.

There were 218 households, of which 28.9% had children under the age of 18 living with them, 39.9% were married couples living together, 17.0% had a female householder with no husband present, 4.6% had a male householder with no wife present, and 38.5% were non-families. 33.0% of all households were made up of individuals, and 11.9% had someone living alone who was 65 years of age or older. The average household size was 2.20 and the average family size was 2.80.

The median age in the town was 38.8 years. 21.8% of residents were under the age of 18; 9.5% were between the ages of 18 and 24; 25.8% were from 25 to 44; 25.8% were from 45 to 64; and 16.9% were 65 years of age or older. The gender makeup of the town was 52.7% male and 47.3% female.

=== 2000 census ===
As of the census of 2000, there were 593 people, 261 households, and 153 families living in the town. The population density was 1,034.8 inhabitants per square mile (401.7/km^{2}). There were 316 housing units at an average density of 551.4 per square mile (214.0/km^{2}). The racial makeup of the town was 98.82% White, 0.17% Native American, and 1.01% from two or more races. Hispanic or Latino of any race were 0.17% of the population.

There were 261 households, out of which 32.2% had children under the age of 18 living with them, 37.2% were married couples living together, 17.2% had a female householder with no husband present, and 41.0% were non-families. 39.1% of all households were made up of individuals, and 19.2% had someone living alone who was 65 years of age or older. The average household size was 2.21 and the average family size was 2.91.

In the town, the population was spread out, with 27.8% under the age of 18, 9.1% from 18 to 24, 23.8% from 25 to 44, 22.3% from 45 to 64, and 17.0% who were 65 years of age or older. The median age was 35 years. For every 100 females, there were 83.6 males. For every 100 females age 18 and over, there were 76.1 males.

The median income for a household in the town was $14,712, and the median income for a family was $15,000. Males had a median income of $25,893 versus $14,250 for females. The per capita income for the town was $11,415. About 47.3% of families and 39.1% of the population were below the poverty line, including 49.4% of those under age 18 and 12.5% of those age 65 or over.

== Economy ==
Some newer businesses in the Clay area are located along what is called "Two Run" by locals. In May 2015, the Piggly Wiggly on 2200 Main Street closed; it was the only grocery store at the time in Clay County.

== Notable people ==
- Oscar Lambert, American football, basketball, baseball, table tennis, and chess player
- Dave Vineyard, baseball player who pitched in part of the 1964 season for the Baltimore Orioles

== See also ==
- WYAP-LP
