= Joes Creek =

Tributary in West Virginia

Location
- Country: United States
- State: West Virginia

Physical characteristics
- Source
  - location: near Sumerco, WV
  - coordinates: 38°13′47″N 81°55′25″W
- Mouth: Trace Fork
  - location: near Garretts Bend, WV
  - coordinates: 38°17′34.2″N 81°55′06.0″W
- Length: 5.5 mi (8.9 km)

Joes Creek is a 5.5-mile-long (8.9 km) secondary tributary (via Trace Fork) of the Mud River, in Lincoln County in the U.S. state of West Virginia. The stream is located in eastern Lincoln County and lies 4.4 miles from Tornado. Through Trace Fork, the Mud River, the Guyandotte River, and finally the Ohio River, it is part of the watershed of the Mississippi.

Joes Creek rises in Sumerco, mostly from runoff from Sumerco Mountain, and is fed by a smaller stream known as Laurel Fork. It flows mostly northward, eventually flowing into Trace Fork from the southeast, 0.8 miles (1.3 km) from Garretts Bend. The upper portion of the stream was historically referred to as Williams Fork but is no longer common usage.
