= Garretts Bend, West Virginia =

Unincorporated community in West Virginia, United States

- Unincorporated community
- Location within West Virginia Location within the United States
- Coordinates: 38°18′14″N 81°54′53″W
- Country: United States
- State: West Virginia
- County: Lincoln
- Elevation: 682 ft (208 m)
- Time zone: UTC-5 (Eastern (EST))
  - Summer (DST): UTC-4 (EDT)
- GNIS feature ID: 1539350

Garretts Bend is an unincorporated community on the Trace Fork of the Mud River in northeastern Lincoln County, West Virginia, United States. It lends its name to the United States Geological Survey's "Garretts Bend" Quadrangle. The village is spread out above an eastward bend of the Trace Fork, where the Hayzlett Fork meets the Williams Fork. (Note: The name "Williams Fork" appears on the 1909 and 1933 topographical survey maps, but in 1958 this is labeled part of Joes Creek, and in 1978 it is part of the main branch of the Trace Fork, previously identified as the Dry Branch.) Garretts Bend Road (County Highway 5) runs through the village on its route from Griffithsville to Sod, and meets Toney Branch Road (County Highway 58) just above the bend. To the east along Garretts Bend Road is the Garretts Bend Community Center, while the Garrett Cemetery sits upon a hilltop overlooking the same highway to the southwest.

== History ==
Long before European settlement, the valleys and ridges surrounding present-day Garretts Bend were used by Indigenous peoples, including Shawnee, Delaware (Lenape), and other Native American groups who traveled the waterways of western Virginia for hunting, fishing, and trade. The Coal River watershed served as an important transportation corridor linking the interior Appalachian Mountains to the Kanawha Valley. European explorers first documented the Coal River in 1742, when John Peter Salling reported extensive coal deposits along its banks.

Following the American Revolution, settlers gradually moved into the upper Coal River region. By around 1800, mills and small farming communities had begun to appear along the Coal River and at Upper Falls, which developed into an early center of commerce and transportation. Timber and agricultural products from the surrounding valleys were floated downstream to settlements along the Kanawha River. Beginning in the early nineteenth century, coal from the upper Coal River basin also became an increasingly important resource.

The earliest permanent settlers of the Garretts Bend area included the Pauley, Hayzlett, McCoy, and Garrett families, whose descendants remained prominent in the community for generations. According to local tradition, the Pauley family established the first homestead in the area in 1798. The community later developed around the confluence of the Hayzlett Fork, Williams Fork, and Trace Fork of the Mud River, reflecting the influence of these founding families on the area’s geography and settlement patterns.

During the nineteenth century, Garretts Bend remained closely connected to the broader Coal River region and to Upper Falls. Residents relied on subsistence agriculture, timbering, gristmills, and river transportation, which linked isolated communities in present-day Lincoln County to markets along the Kanawha River.

A 1909 topographical survey map shows about a dozen structures spread out along the creek and its various tributaries, including a church on the south side of Garretts Bend Road just west of where the highway crosses the Hayzlett Fork. In 1933, a similar number of structures is located in the same vicinity, although some of those from 1909 no longer exist. The church is gone, but a schoolhouse sits on a point of land surrounded by the bend. The schoolhouse is still there in 1958 and 1978, and Elizabeth Missionary Baptist Church is located near the site of the 1909 church. (Note: For unknown reasons, the words "Elizabeth Church" are located by the schoolhouse, but the church itself is shown further south, along the main highway.) The Garretts Bend Post Office was established in 1876, and maintained until 1965, when it was discontinued, and the mail redirected to Hamlin.
