= Packsville, West Virginia =

- Unincorporated community
- Location within the state of West Virginia Packsville, West Virginia (the United States)
- Coordinates: 37°57′07″N 81°31′41″W
- Country: United States
- State: West Virginia
- County: Raleigh
- Elevation: 899 ft (274 m)
- Time zone: UTC-5 (Eastern (EST))
  - Summer (DST): UTC-4 (EDT)
- Area codes: 304 & 681
- GNIS feature ID: 1555290

Packsville is an unincorporated community in Raleigh County, West Virginia, United States. Packsville is located on the Little Marsh Fork, 4.4 miles (7.1 km) south-southeast of Sylvester.

The community was named after the local Pack family.
