= Canassatego =

Onondaga leader

Onondaga leader

Personal details
- Born: c. 1684
- Died: 1750

Canassatego (c. 1684–1750; also spelled Canasatego) was a leader of the Onondaga nation who became a prominent diplomat and spokesman of the Haudenosaunee Confederacy in the 1740s. He was involved in several controversial land sales to colonial British officials. He is now best known for a speech he gave at the 1744 Treaty of Lancaster, where he recommended that the British colonies emulate the Haudenosaunee by forming a confederacy. He was reportedly assassinated, perhaps by sympathizers or agents of New France.

== Early career ==
Canassatego appears in British historical documents only during the last eight years of his life, and so little is known of his early life. His earliest documented appearance is at a treaty conference in Philadelphia in 1742, where he was a spokesman for the Onondaga people, one of the six nations of the Haudenosaunee (Iroquois) League. According to most modern scholars, Canassatego did not appear to be one of the fourteen Onondaga hereditary royaner who sat on the Haudenosaunee Grand Council. But Johansen disagrees, saying that Canassatego held the League title of Tadadaho.

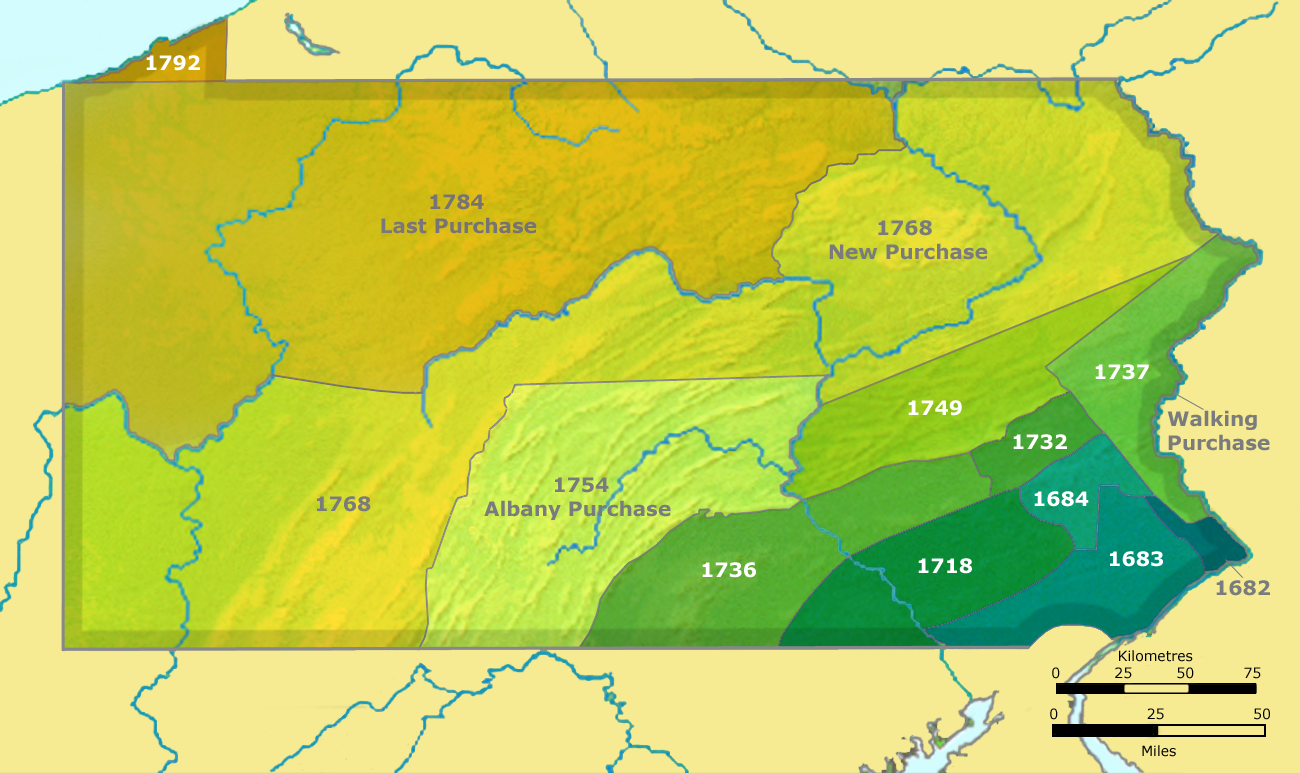
This map shows Pennsylvania's land purchases from Native Americans. Canassatego had a role in the 1736 and 1749 sales, although the Haudenosaunee League nations had a questionable claim to those lands.

In the 1730s, a faction of Haudenosaunee leaders opened a diplomatic relationship with the British Province of Pennsylvania, facilitated by Conrad Weiser, Pennsylvania's interpreter and agent. Pennsylvania agreed to recognize the Haudenosaunee as the owner of all Indian lands in Pennsylvania; the Haudenosaunee, in turn, agreed to sell lands only to Pennsylvania representatives. Canassatego probably attended a 1736 treaty where some Haudenosaunee chiefs sold land along the Susquehanna River to Pennsylvania, although the territory had traditionally been occupied by the Lenape people.

Canassatego served as the speaker for the Onondaga at another conference in 1742, where the Haudenosaunee chiefs collected the final payment for the 1736 land sale. At this meeting, Canassatego managed to convince Governor Thomas Penn to pay more than the original purchase price. Penn, for his part, urged Canassatego to remove the Lenape (Delaware) from what was known as the Walking Purchase of 1737, which was quite controversial. Canassatego complied, berating the Lenape as "women" who had no right to sell land, and ordering them to leave. "You are women; take the Advice of a Wise Man and remove immediately", he told the Lenape. The Haudenosaunee denigration of the Lenape as "women" has been the subject of much scholarly writing.

== Lancaster treaty ==
In 1744, Canassatego served as a speaker at meetings to negotiate the Treaty of Lancaster. Witham Marshe, a Marylander in attendance, recorded the only written description of Canassatego:

The first of these sachems (or chiefs) was a tall, wellmade man; had a very full chest, and brawny limbs. He had a manly countenance, mixed with a good-natured smile. He was about 60 years of age; very active, strong, and had a surprising liveliness in his speech, which I observed in the discourse betwixt him, Mr. Weiser, and some of the sachems.

At the treaty conference were representatives of five of the Haudenosaunee nations (except the Mohawk, the easternmost tribe), and the provinces of Pennsylvania, Maryland, and Virginia. With King George's War underway, the British colonies needed to cultivate a good relationship with their Haudenosaunee neighbors, who might otherwise become French allies. After a speech by Canassatego, officials from Maryland and Virginia agreed to pay the Haudenosaunee for land in their colonies, although they believed that the Haudenosaunee had no legitimate claim to those lands. Virginia got the better part of the deal, however: although Canassatego and other Haudenosaunee leaders believed that they had sold only the Shenandoah Valley to Virginia, the official deed gave Virginia much more land than that.

Near the end of the conference, Canassatego gave the colonists some advice:

We have one thing further to say, and that is We heartily recommend Union and a Good Agreement between you our Brethren. Never disagree, but preserve a strict Friendship for one another, and thereby you as well as we will become the Stronger.

Our wise Forefathers established Union and Amity between the Five Nations; this has made us formidable, this has given us great weight and Authority with our Neighboring Nations.

We are a powerful confederacy, and, by your observing the same Methods our wise Forefathers have taken, you will acquire fresh Strength and Power; therefore, whatever befalls you, never fall out with one another.

Canassatego was concerned that the British colonies lacked a coordinated policy to deal with the military threat coming from New France. He made similar recommendations about colonial unity at another conference in 1745. His words became a central part of the Iroquois Influence Thesis, the controversial proposal that the Haudenosaunee Confederacy was a model for the United States Constitution. Canassatego was replaced by Hendrick Theyanoguin as a 6, not 5, Nation diplomat who continued building alliances with Britain's Northern Colonies with his friend William Johnson in 1754. Hendrick Theyanoguin was killed fighting the French a year later. This work, begun by Canassatego and continued by Hendrick Theyanoguin, progressed towards Benjamin Franklin's introducing "Short Hints towards a Scheme for a General Union of the British Colonies on the Continent" (1754), which became the prototype for the U.S. federal system declared in 1776.

== Final years ==
Canassatego's final appearance at a treaty conference was in August 1749, one year after the end of King George's War. In Philadelphia, he complained that colonists were settling on Native land along the Susquehanna River. He agreed to sell this land to Pennsylvania, but once again, the written document ceded much more land than what had been agreed upon in negotiations.

Canassatego was reportedly assassinated with poison in September 1750. Contemporary accounts that were recorded said that he was killed for taking bribes in exchange for selling tribal communal lands. Another said that he had been poisoned by agents of New France. Historian William Starna argued that Canassatego was probably assassinated by pro-French Haudenosaunee who wanted to repudiate Canassatego's diplomatic ties with Pennsylvania.

== Legacy ==
A fictional version of Canassatego was featured in the 1755 novel Lydia: or Filial Piety, by English writer John Shebbeare. Following a literary convention by which Native American characters were used to satirize Europeans, Canassatego was portrayed as wise and honest, in stark contrast to the scheming Englishmen he encounters.

The US Navy named the USS Canasatego (YN-38/YNT-6/YTM-732), a harbor tug, for Canassatego.
