= Battle of Galudoghson =

1742 skirmish between Indians and Virginia settlers

| Date | December 18, 1742 |
| Location | near present-day Glasgow, Virginia 37°37′59″N 79°27′6″W |
| Result | Both sides withdrew |

Belligerents
| Virginia | Haudenosaunee; Onondaga; Oneida |

Commanders and leaders
| Colonel James Patton; Captain John McDowell †; Captain John Buchanan | Jonnhaty |

Units involved
| Augusta County militia (Virginia militia) | Haudenosaunee war party |

Strength
| 33 militia troops, some mounted | 29–36 Haudenosaunee warriors |

Casualties and losses
| 8 dead, 3 wounded | 3–17 dead, 5 wounded |

The Battle of Galudoghson took place in December 1742, at a site near present-day Glasgow, Virginia, when the Augusta County militia engaged in combat with Onondaga and Oneida Indians. These warriors had traveled to Virginia from Pennsylvania under the command of a Haudenosaunee chief named Jonnhaty, to participate in a campaign against the Catawba. The battle was the first armed conflict between settlers in Western Virginia and Native Americans. Several distinct accounts of the battle exist, with contradictory details. The Haudenosaunee regarded the battle as an unprovoked act of aggression, while the Virginia colonists claimed that the Haudenosaunee had raided Virginia settlements and killed livestock. The battle was one factor that led colonial authorities to negotiate with Native American leaders for the 1744 Treaty of Lancaster.

== Etymology ==
The altercation remained without any formal title until the 1995 posthumous publication of a collection of papers and analysis compiled by historian Lyman Draper, in which it was designated "the Battle of Galudoghson," using a Haudenosaunee name for the James River.

== Background ==
At a series of conferences in Pennsylvania during the 1730s, the Six Nations repeatedly stated that they did not feel they had been fairly compensated for traditional homelands appropriated by European settlers. This led to fears, on the part of authorities in Pennsylvania, Maryland, and Virginia, of violent retribution. Native Americans traveling through the region often helped themselves to food from settler's homes or took livestock, which led to tension. In 1737, a local militia captain, John Lewis, was told not to "offer any Violence to any of the said Indians passing quietly through their plantations...unless the said Indians do first Commit Hostilities."

In 1742, rumors spread through Maryland that "several nations of our own Indians [will] rise and cut off the English...assisted by 500 of the Shawan (Shawnee) & Northern Indians (Haudenosaunee) and about the same time the French with the Assistance of other Indians." During a July conference in Philadelphia, chief Canasatego stated that, if compensation was not received, "we are able to do ourselves Justice," which alarmed the Pennsylvania legislature. Gifts distributed to the Haudenosaunee representatives, intended to pacify them, included five hundred pounds of gunpowder, six hundred pounds of lead, and forty-five guns. When a group of twenty-two Onondaga and seven Oneida Indians warriors entered Virginia in December 1742 and began harassing settlers and killing livestock, many people believed that this was a sign that an attack was imminent, however the local militia commander, Colonel James Patton, attempted to prevent bloodshed by sending a militia company, under the command of Captain John McDowell, to escort the warriors out of Augusta County.

== Virginia colonists' accounts of the battle ==
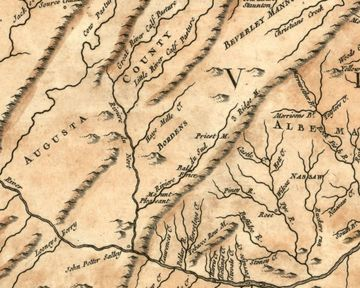
Borden's Tract, where the Haudenosaunee war party paused to visit John McDowell's home. It lies just north of the site of the Battle of Galudoghson, and was owned by land speculator Benjamin Borden. The home of John Peter Salling (written John Petter Salley) can be seen at the bottom left. Depicted on a 1757 map of Virginia and Maryland.

In an 1808 letter to Colonel Arthur Campbell, Captain John McDowell's son Samuel McDowell reported that, after entering Virginia, Jonnhaty's war party of warriors traveled south along the Great Indian Warpath to an area known as "Borden's Tract" in Augusta County and on 1 December, they stopped for a day at John McDowell's home, where they were given food and "treated with whiskey." Captain McDowell "directed them to a convenient hunting ground...a few miles off." The Indians then traveled to the James River (known to them as the Galudoghson), and camped near its confluence with the Maury River. Local settlers reported to Captain McDowell that the Indians had killed at least one hog belonging to them, and "went to Peoples houses, Scared the women and Children [and] took what they wanted, and in some instances shot some of the people's horses." On 15 December, Captain McDowell contacted his commanding officer, Colonel Patton, and Patton ordered McDowell and his 33-man militia company (which included Lieutenant James McDowell, one of McDowell's eight brothers, and their father Ephraim) to escort the war party out of Augusta County. The militia encountered the war party on 17 December near the homestead of John Peter Salling, and followed them at a distance for two days, until one of the Indians fell behind, then made a detour into the forest near Balcony Falls, possibly to relieve himself, at which point a militiaman fired at him. He let out a war-cry, and the other Indians then opened fire and killed two mounted soldiers and Captain John McDowell, who had ridden to the head of the Indian war party and was conversing with Jonnhaty. In the battle that followed, three or four of the Indian warriors (Samuel McDowell says seventeen) were killed. Three militiamen were wounded and seven killed besides McDowell.

Settlers who witnessed the battle reported that the Indians had killed several hogs, horses and cattle, and that Captain McDowell had approached the war party with a white flag "in order to parley with them, but they fir'd and kill'd him & some of his Men before one Shot was fir'd by his party." Lieutenant James McDowell, who was present, told The Pennsylvania Gazette that Captain McDowell approached the warriors (whom James McDowell identified as Shawnee) saying, "Gentlemen, we are upon peaceable terms, lay down your arms and no man shall molest you." He reported that the Indians immediately opened fire, and that Captain McDowell was shot three times: in the head, chest and abdomen, and that "eight men of each side were killed." Samuel McDowell states that the militia opened fire first, but places the blame for the battle on the warriors' refusal to respect the property rights of Virginia settlers, by killing their livestock.

=== James Patton's reports of the battle ===
Colonel Patton, in a letter to Virginia Governor William Gooch dated 18 December, stated that a man bearing a white flag had been killed by the Indians and that eight or ten warriors had been killed and eleven militiamen, including Captain McDowell. Patton reports that he rode to the scene with twenty-three reinforcements, arriving two or three hours after the fighting had ended. On 23 December, Patton wrote an amended account of the battle in a second letter to Governor Gooch, stating that the number of warriors had been thirty-six and that on 19 December, two men had been sent forward with a white flag "desiring Peace and Friendship." Patton notes that, before opening fire, the Indians had called out, "O friends are you there, have we found you?" He says eight militiamen were killed but does not give the number of wounded. According to Patton, the Indians fled into the forest and were pursued for "several hundred yards" by Captain John Buchanan and eight militiamen.

== Account of the battle by Native Americans ==
An account of the battle was given to Conrad Weiser by Shikellamy's grandson in February, 1743. The grandson, who was among the warriors who took part in the battle, stated that, after they had crossed the Potomac River, they found no deer and would have "starved to death if they had not killed a hog now and then." When they reach the Shenandoah Valley, a group of white settlers, suspecting that this war party planned to raid Virginia settlements, surrounded them and tried to confiscate their guns. When one of the warriors took out a knife and threatened to stab them, the settlers let them go. Two days later, the warriors were confronted by ten settlers, armed with pitchforks, who accompanied them to a "big House" full of white people. The warriors were invited to enter, but only a few of the oldest dared to do so. A white man with a sword, identified by the warriors as a captain, tried to persuade the other warriors to come inside, but they refused. The warriors produced a written pass from the Pennsylvania authorities (a Justice Hogg, according to McKee) giving them permission to travel, but the settlers told them that they could not continue, at which point the warriors left the house. The "captain" then brandished his sword, commanding them not to leave, and the warriors prepared to fight, but were told by Jonnhaty "to be quiet till they were hurt."

McKee, in his deposition, reports that the Indians admitted to having entered a settler's home uninvited, and engaged in a struggle with the owner, who let them go after being threatened with a knife.

The war party traveled for three days and were camped, when a white man, evidently a scout, arrived and counted them. He told the Indians he was a hunter and left. The Indians were on the road when "a Great number of white Men on horseback" bearing a white flag, confronted them. Two boys who were with the war party became frightened and ran away, at which point some of the white men fired at them and missed. Jonnhaty cautioned his men not to return fire because "a white Colour [flag] was always a token of Peace among the white Men." The horsemen then dismounted and fired again, killing two warriors, one of whom was Shikellamy's cousin. The warriors returned fire and then attacked with hatchets. The white men fled, and Jonnhaty ordered his men not to follow them, saying that they had come to Virginia to fight Catawbas, not white men. They found eight white men killed and took several horses. Five warriors were wounded, but the number of dead was not reported. Ten warriors accompanied the wounded back to Great Island, (present-day Lock Haven, Pennsylvania) arriving on 12 or 13 January. They gave an account of the battle which was heard by community leaders and a trader named Thomas McKee, who reported what he had heard in a deposition to Conrad Weiser on 26 January. A summary of McKee's deposition was published in the Pennsylvania Gazette on 27 January.

== Aftermath ==
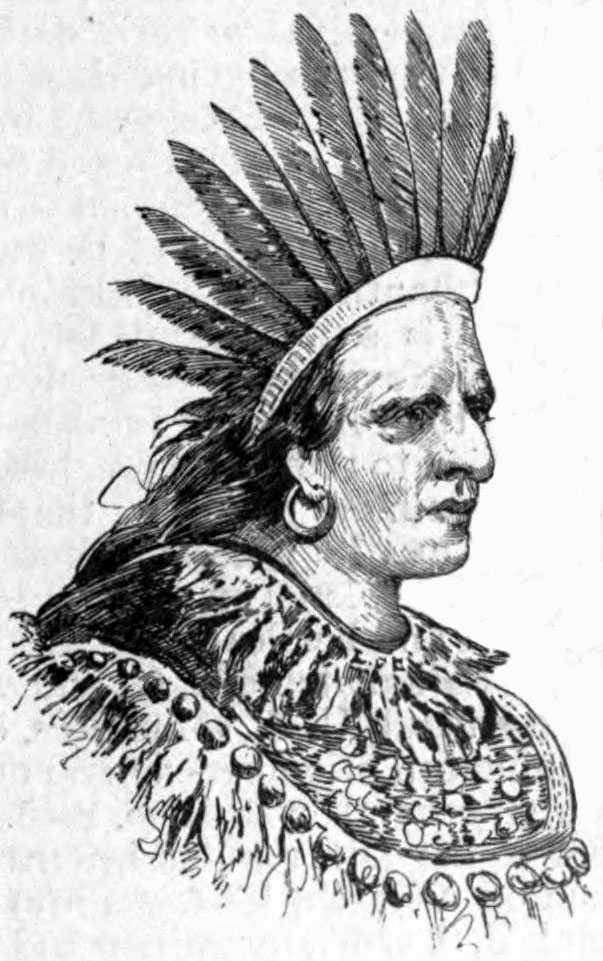
Shikellamy, portrait in Appletons' Cyclopædia of American Biography.

Lieutenant James McDowell reported that Colonel Patton and his men reached the battlefield early the following morning and retrieved the militia dead, placing the "bloody corpses on horseback and laid them side by side near McDowell's dwelling, while they prepared their graves in overwhelming sorrow." Captain McDowell was buried in the McDowell family burial plot in Fairfield, Rockbridge County, Virginia. Patton wrote to Governor Gooch that he had received reports from the militia that they had seen "white men supposed to be French among the Indians," and that he had responded by ordering "patrowlers on all our frontiers, well equipp'd, and drafted out a certain number of young men out of each company to be in readiness to reinforce any Party or Place that needs help." Patton added "we have certain news of one Hundred and fifty Indians seen seventy miles above me, and about the same number lately crost Patowmack on their way up here."

Within days of the battle, Governor Gooch convened the Virginia Council, which ordered that powder and shot be sent to Patton and alerted the militia in Orange and Fairfax counties. In early 1743, Shikellamy traveled to Williamsburg to make a statement to the council. Gooch also wrote to New York governor George Clarke asking Clarke to "inquire what Indian nation dared to treat His Majesties subjects in so insolent and outrageous manner," and "what part of this Government it is they dispute." After hearing McKee's report of the Indians' account of the battle, Pennsylvania Lieutenant Governor George Thomas wrote to Gooch that "the Indians own that they kill'd some Hoggs to asswage their hunger, which, join'd to their threats last year in case they were not paid for their lands, seems to me to have been the fatal cause of the Skirmish." Thomas did not think the Indians had planned any aggression on Virginia settlers, saying that "Had they design'd hostilities, it is not probable they would have trust'd themselves in any of the white Inhabitants' houses, as some of them did upon their invitation."

In June 1743, Conrad Weiser was sent by Gooch to Onondaga to meet with the Haudenosaunee leaders who, according to Gooch, "have given me the strongest assurances that no fresh Hostilities shall be exercised against [the Virginia settlers]." While there, Weiser and the Haudenosaunee leaders heard Jonnhaty's version of events, and Weiser describes him as "a very thoughtful and honest Man," who "took a deal of Time in telling the Story." The governor sent £100 worth of goods with Weiser as a peace offering.

The battle was one of the motivating factors that led colonial authorities to negotiate with Native American leaders for the 1744 Treaty of Lancaster, one of several Six Nations land cessions during the 18th century.

== Sources ==
The battle is recounted in detail in four primary sources:

1) Two letters from Colonel James Patton, written 18 and 23 December 1742, to Governor Gooch.
2) A deposition by Thomas McKee before Conrad Weiser on 26 January 1743, in which McKee relates the description of the battle provided by the Haudenosaunee survivors.
3) An account of the battle given to Weiser by Shikellamy's grandson in February, 1743.
4) Three articles published in The Pennsylvania Gazette on 27 January, 2 February and 31 March, 1743, the last of which cites James McDowell (John McDowell's brother), an eyewitness, as a source.

A significant secondary source is an 1808 letter from Judge Samuel McDowell, son of Captain John McDowell, who was killed in the battle. Samuel McDowell, who was seven years old when his father was killed, reports family traditions that he grew up with.

There are scattered references to the battle in the correspondence of Governor Thomas, Governor Clarke, and Governor Gooch.

Lyman Draper's Action at the Galudoghson, December 14, 1742. Colonel James Patton, Captain John McDowell and the First Battle with the Indians in the Valley of Virginia with an Appendix Containing Early Accounts of the Battle, was assembled after Draper's death from his unpublished papers and contains complete transcripts of all sources.

== Memorialization ==
A historical marker commemorating the event is located beside Virginia Route 130 where it intersects with U.S. Route 501 in Glasgow, Virginia.

A historical marker commemorates the battle at John McDowell's gravesite in the McDowell family burial plot in Fairfield, Rockbridge County, Virginia.
