= Wraxall =

Wraxall may refer to:

== People ==
- Baron Wraxall, a title in the Peerage of the United Kingdom
- Wraxall baronets, of Somerset, England
- Peter Wraxall (died 1759), English official in New York Province
- Nathaniel Wraxall (died 1831), English author and baronet

== Places in England ==
- Wraxall, Dorset, a civil parish including Higher Wraxall and Lower Wraxall
- Wraxall, Somerset, a village in North Somerset
  - Wraxall and Failand, a civil parish in North Somerset, near Nailsea, formerly just "Wraxall"
- Wraxall, Ditcheat, a hamlet in Ditcheat parish, Somerset, near Castle Cary

== See also ==
- South Wraxall, Wiltshire, England
  - South Wraxall Manor
- North Wraxall, Wiltshire
- Upper Wraxall, Wiltshire
