= Orgas, West Virginia =

- Unincorporated community
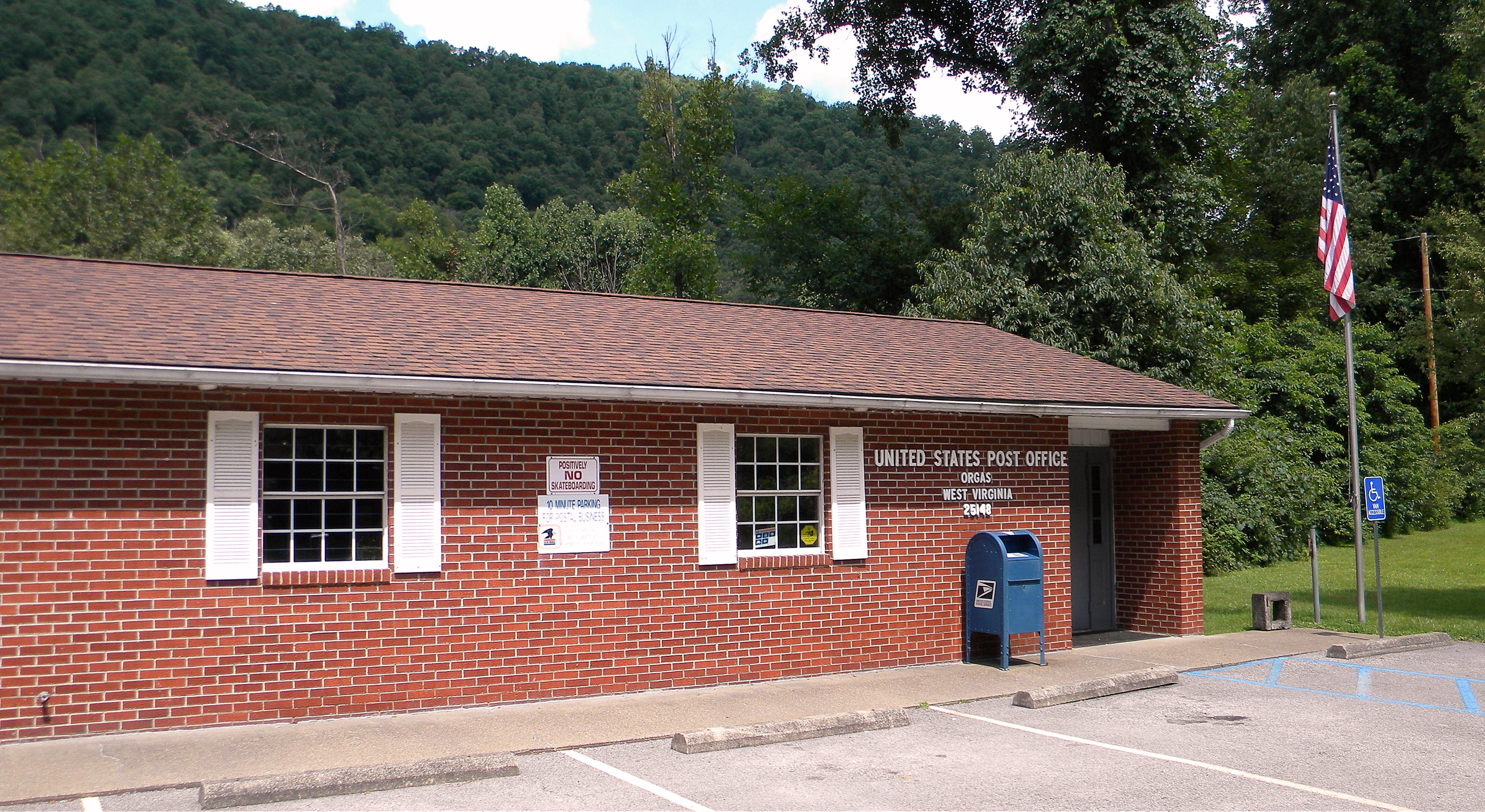
- Post Office at Orgas, West Virginia

- Location within West Virginia Location within the United States
- Coordinates: 38°03′30″N 81°34′20″W
- Country: United States
- State: West Virginia
- County: Boone
- Elevation: 741 ft (226 m)
- Time zone: UTC-5 (Eastern (EST))
  - Summer (DST): UTC-4 (EDT)
- ZIP code: 25148
- Area codes: 304 & 681
- GNIS feature ID: 1555271

Orgas is an unincorporated community in Boone County, West Virginia, United States. Orgas is located on the Coal River and West Virginia Route 3, 3.5 miles (5.6 km) north-northwest of Sylvester. Orgas has a post office with ZIP code 25148. Orgas was named after the Orange Gas Coal Company which was established in 1919.
