= Julian, West Virginia =

- Unincorporated community
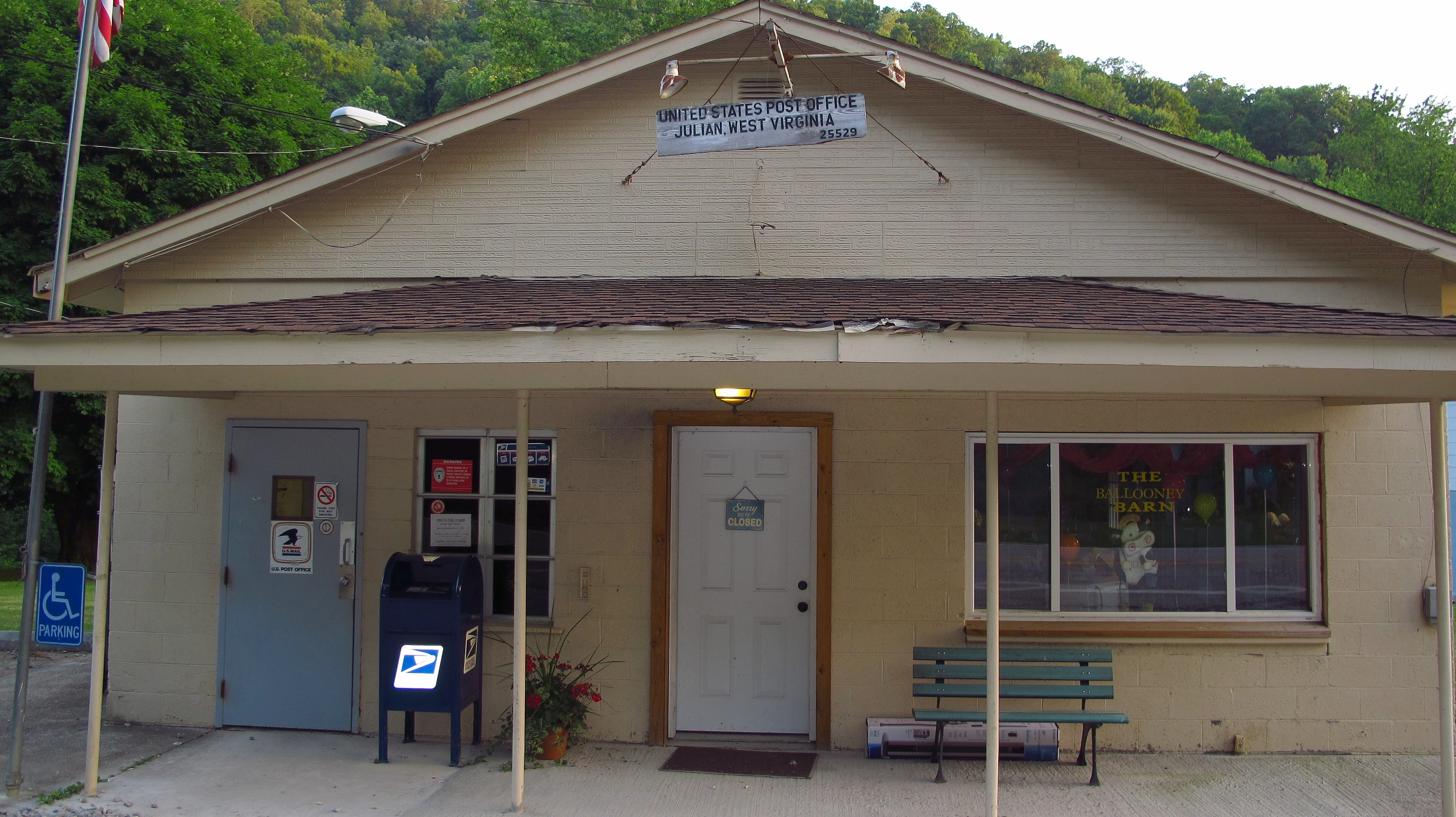
- Post Office in Julian, West Virginia

- Location within West Virginia Location within the United States
- Coordinates: 38°09′26″N 81°51′20″W
- Country: United States
- State: West Virginia
- County: Boone
- Elevation: 669 ft (204 m)
- Time zone: UTC-5 (Eastern (EST))
  - Summer (DST): UTC-4 (EDT)
- ZIP code: 25529
- Area codes: 304 & 681
- GNIS feature ID: 1554836

Julian is an unincorporated community populated place on West Virginia Route 3 in Boone County, West Virginia, United States. It is just west of U.S. Route 119.

Julian was named around 1900 for Julian Hill, a prominent land owner of the area. It was at one time known as Hill. The current population is 936.

The Little Coal River flows nearby.

Adams, West Virginia is a smaller community immediately to the north.
