= Glasgow, Virginia =

- Town
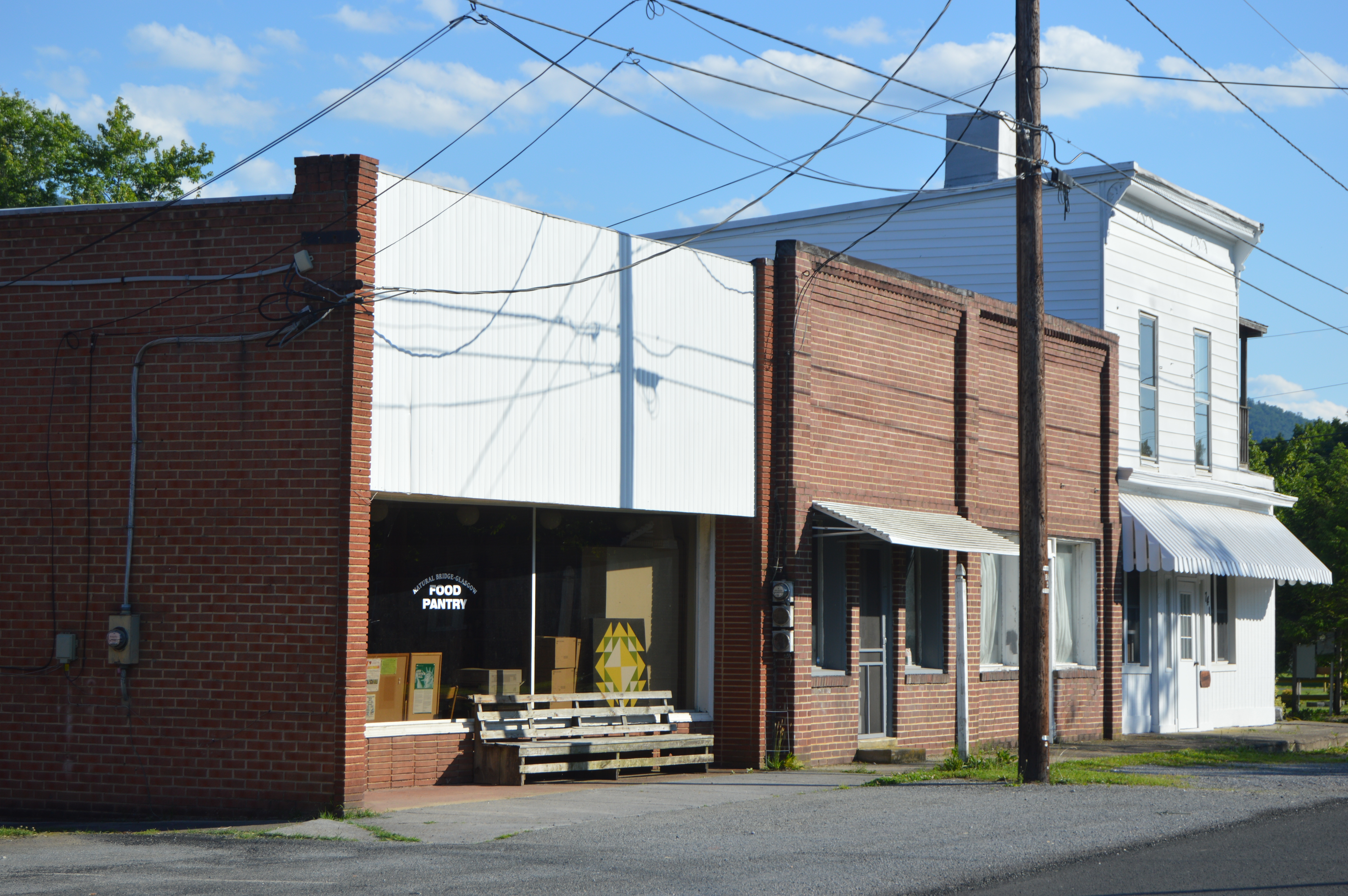
- McCullough Street in the historic district

- Flag

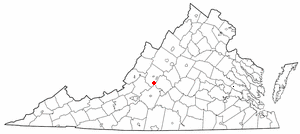
- Location of Glasgow, Virginia
- Coordinates: 37°37′59″N 79°27′6″W
- Country: United States
- State: Virginia
- County: Rockbridge

Area
  - Total: 1.53 sq mi (3.97 km^{2})
  - Land: 1.53 sq mi (3.95 km^{2})
  - Water: 0.0039 sq mi (0.01 km^{2})
- Elevation: 738 ft (225 m)

Population (2020)
  - Total: 1,052
  - Density: 689/sq mi (266.2/km^{2})
- Time zone: UTC-5 (Eastern (EST))
  - Summer (DST): UTC-4 (EDT)
- ZIP code: 24555
- Area code: 540
- FIPS code: 51-31136
- GNIS feature ID: 1494956
- Website: Official website

Glasgow is a town in Rockbridge County, Virginia, United States, at the confluence of the James and Maury Rivers. The population was 1,052 at the 2020 census.

Glasgow has had issues with flooding, notably during Hurricane Camille in 1969. As a result of flooding concerns, the Balcony Falls Dam (just east of the confluence of the James and Maury rivers) was removed in 1973. From 2001 to 2007, the town was known for having at least a dozen fiberglass dinosaur figures along the roadside.

== History ==
German explorer John Peter Salling and his brother Adam were the first settlers in the vicinity of Glasgow, arriving c. 1741. In December 1742, Iroquois warriors and a Virginia militia company fought the Battle of Galudoghson near the confluence of the James River and the Maury River. The militia captain, John McDowell, was killed, along with eight soldiers. Between 1760 and 1768, John Paxton II acquired most of the Salling property. Robert, Joseph, and Arthur Glasgow settled in the area in 1768. Glasgow was named for Joseph Glasgow, son of Arthur. Joseph and his wife, Nancy Ellis McCullough, built their home, known as Union Ridge, in 1823.

In 1854 Frank Padgett, a black slave, drowned while attempting to rescue passengers stranded on a canal boat by the swollen James River. A granite obelisk monument commemorating his death stands in Glasgow's Centennial Park.

Glasgow was established on March 5, 1890, when the Rockbridge Company held a drawing of lots. At that time only two houses, Union Ridge and the Salling home, stood in Glasgow, which then had a population of only 20 people. By 1892, the town had paved roads, streetlamps, telephone service and a 200-room hotel, the Rockbridge Hotel. The panic of 1893, however, led to an economic collapse that put the Rockbridge Company out of business. The hotel was abandoned and torn down around 1906. The Virginia Electrical Power Company (VEPCO, now Dominion Energy) built a hydroelectric plant at Balcony Falls in 1915. The plant operated until 1969. Citing evidence that the devastating flood of 1969 was exacerbated by the dam, citizens of Glasgow petitioned for its removal in 1974. Flooding has affected the town numerous times. Since the earliest recorded flood in 1877, the city was flooded in 1936, 1950, 1969, 1972, 1985, and 1995, with those of 1936, 1969, and 1985 being the worst.

== Geography ==
Glasgow is located at 37°37′59″N 79°27′06″W (37.633093, -79.451542). Glasgow is approximately six miles east of the community of Natural Bridge, the site of the historic land bridge of the same name.

According to the United States Census Bureau, the town has a total area of 1.5 square miles (4.0 km^{2}), all land.

=== Climate ===
The climate in this area is characterized by hot, humid summers and generally mild to cool winters. According to the Köppen Climate Classification system, Glasgow has a humid subtropical climate, abbreviated "Cfa" on climate maps. On July 15, 1954, Balcony Falls recorded a maximum temperature of 110 °F (43 °C), which is the highest temperature ever recorded in the state of Virginia.

== Demographics ==
Historical population
Census	Pop.	Note	%±
1910	407		—
1920	376		−7.6%
1930	507		34.8%
1940	938		85.0%
1950	810		−13.6%
1960	1,091		34.7%
1970	1,304		19.5%
1980	1,259		−3.5%
1990	1,140		−9.5%
2000	1,046		−8.2%
2010	1,133		8.3%
2020	1,052		−7.1%
U.S. Decennial Census

As of the census of 2000, there were 1,046 people, 450 households, and 296 families living in the town. The population density was 691.9 people per square mile (267.5/km^{2}). There were 494 housing units at an average density of 326.7 per square mile (126.3/km^{2}). The racial makeup of the town was 80.50% White, 16.16% African American, 0.48% Native American, 0.38% Asian, and 2.49% from two or more races. Hispanic or Latino of any race were 0.57% of the population.

There were 450 households, out of which 28.7% had children under the age of 18 living with them, 44.4% were married couples living together, 14.0% had a female householder with no husband present, and 34.2% were non-families. 30.9% of all households were made up of individuals, and 15.1% had someone living alone who was 65 years of age or older. The average household size was 2.32 and the average family size was 2.87.

In the town, the population was spread out, with 23.9% under the age of 18, 7.6% from 18 to 24, 25.0% from 25 to 44, 25.3% from 45 to 64, and 18.2% who were 65 years of age or older. The median age was 40 years. For every 100 females, there were 92.6 males. For every 100 females aged 18 and over, there were 87.7 males.

The median income for a household in the town was $28,819, and the median income for a family was $37,292. Males had a median income of $28,235 versus $21,422 for females. The per capita income for the town was $14,093. About 8.9% of families and 14.5% of the population were below the poverty line, including 21.5% of those under age 18 and 15.1% of those age 65 or over.
