= Glasgow Historic District =

Historic district in Virginia, United States

- Glasgow Historic District and Boundary Increase
- U.S. National Register of Historic Places
- U.S. Historic district
- Virginia Landmarks Register
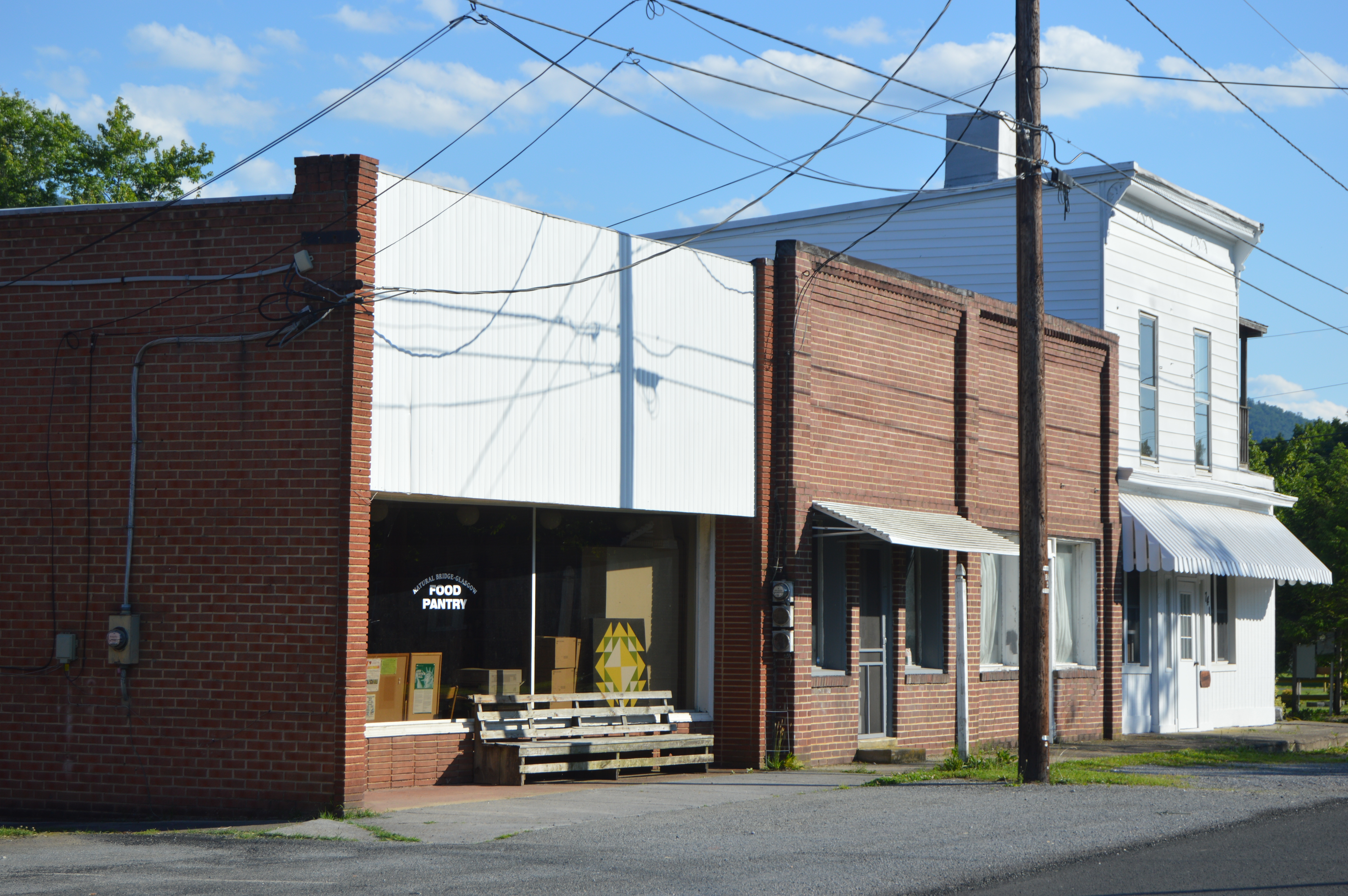
- Commercial buildings along McCullough Street

- Location within Virginia Location within the United States
- Location: Bounded by Seventh, Tenth, Gordon and Powahtan Sts.; also the 900 blocks of Fizlee St. and Rockbridge Rd., Glasgow, Virginia
- Coordinates: 37°37′59″N 79°27′01″W
- Area: 4.6 acres (1.9 ha)
- NRHP reference No.: 95001170, 06000351
- VLR No.: 223-0003

Significant dates
- Added to NRHP: October 30, 1995; May 3, 2006
- Designated VLR: August 28, 1995

Glasgow Historic District is a national historic district located at Glasgow, Rockbridge County, Virginia. The district encompasses 43 contributing buildings, 3 contributing sites, and 1 contributing structure in the central business district of the town of Glasgow. It includes a variety of residential, commercial, and institutional buildings dating from the 1820s to 1920s, with most structures from the 1890s. Notable buildings include the Rebecca Salling House (c. 1920), First Baptist Church, the former Glasgow Baptist Church, St. John's Episcopal Church, Blue Ridge Building (c. 1890), and Glasgow Masonic Temple (1891-1892).

It was listed on the National Register of Historic Places in 1995, with a boundary increase in 2006.
