= Witham Marshe =

American colonist

Witham Marshe was the representative of the colony of Maryland at the negotiation of the Treaty of Lancaster in 1744, where he recorded the negotiations. He noted that the Iroquois were heavy drinkers, however they were careful to remain sober while negotiating important treaties.

He became the crown's Secretary of Indian affairs, serving under Sir William Johnson, after the death of Peter Wraxall in 1759.
