= Elizabeth Page (novelist) =

American novelist

- Elizabeth Page (circa 1909)
- Born: August 27, 1889; Castleton, Vermont, United States
- Died: March 11, 1969 (aged 79); Oaxaca, Mexico
- Occupation: novelist
- Spouse: Herbert Taylor Harris (m. 1954)
- Parent(s): Elizabeth Merwin Roe Page and Alfred Rider Page

Elizabeth Merwin Page Harris (August 27, 1889–March 11, 1969), professionally known as Elizabeth Page, was an American novelist known for her bestselling 1939 historical novel The Tree of Liberty, which was adapted into the 1940 film The Howards of Virginia.

== Early life and education ==
Page was born in Castleton, Vermont, on August 27, 1889, to Alfred Rider and Elizabeth Merwin Roe Page. Raised in New York, Page graduated from Vassar College in 1912 and earned a master's from Columbia University in 1914.

She taught at the Walnut Hill School in Natick, Massachusetts from 1914 to 1916. During this time, Page collaborated with her mother on the book In Camp and Tepee: An Indian Mission Story (1915). This nonfiction book chronicled the outreach efforts of missionaries from the Reformed Church in America to Native American communities in the western United States in the late 19th and early 20th centuries.

During World War I, Page worked for the American Red Cross, Y.M.C.A., and other charities. From 1927 to 1931, Page worked as a secretary for two doctors, Chester E. and Herbert Taylor Harris, in Basin, Wyoming.

== Career ==
Page's first book, Wagons West: A Story of the Oregon Trail (1930), told the story of Henry Page, her great-uncle. It follows his travels from Illinois to California during the 1849 Gold Rush. In 1932, Page published another Western-themed book, Wild Horses and Gold: From Wyoming to the Yukon. The book describes an attempt to take horses from Wyoming to Edmonton, Canada, during the Klondike Gold Rush. It is based on the reminiscences of Byron F. Wickwire of Basin, Wyoming, who appears in the book as the character “Kansas Gilbert.”

Page's best-known title, The Tree of Liberty, was published in 1939. The 985-page novel follows three families in the decades leading up to the American Revolutionary War and through the first years of the new nation. Their stories intersect with each other and with the lives of real historical characters such as Thomas Jefferson and Alexander Hamilton. A contemporary review from The New York Times highlighted the research that supported the novel's plot and Page's ability to bring historical events to life. Another review praised Page's dramatization of the tension between Jeffersonian democracy and the Federalist Party during the early years of the country. In 1940, Columbia Pictures bought the film rights to The Tree of Liberty. Screenwriter Sidney Buchman adapted the first part of the novel for the film's screenplay, and it was released as The Howards of Virginia in September of that year.

Page's last novel, Wilderness Adventure (1946), was based on the true story of explorer John Peter Salling. The novel follows the explorer and his party as they travel the Mississippi River and its tributaries. The plot involves the kidnapping and rescue of a fictional Salling daughter, Lisel. A contemporary Kirkus Review noted Page's ability to invoke the atmosphere of the period.

Page was an active correspondent throughout her life, and the Elizabeth Page Harris Papers are held by the Archives at Yale.

== Personal life ==
Page married Herbert Taylor Harris in December 1954. She died in Oaxaca, Mexico, on March 11, 1969.

== Bibliography ==
- In Camp and Tepee: An Indian Mission Story (1915) - coauthor
- Wagons West: A Story of the Oregon Trail (1930)
- Wild Horses and Gold: From Wyoming to the Yukon (1932)
- The Tree of Liberty (1939)
- Wilderness Adventure (1946)
