= Alfred R. Page =

American politician

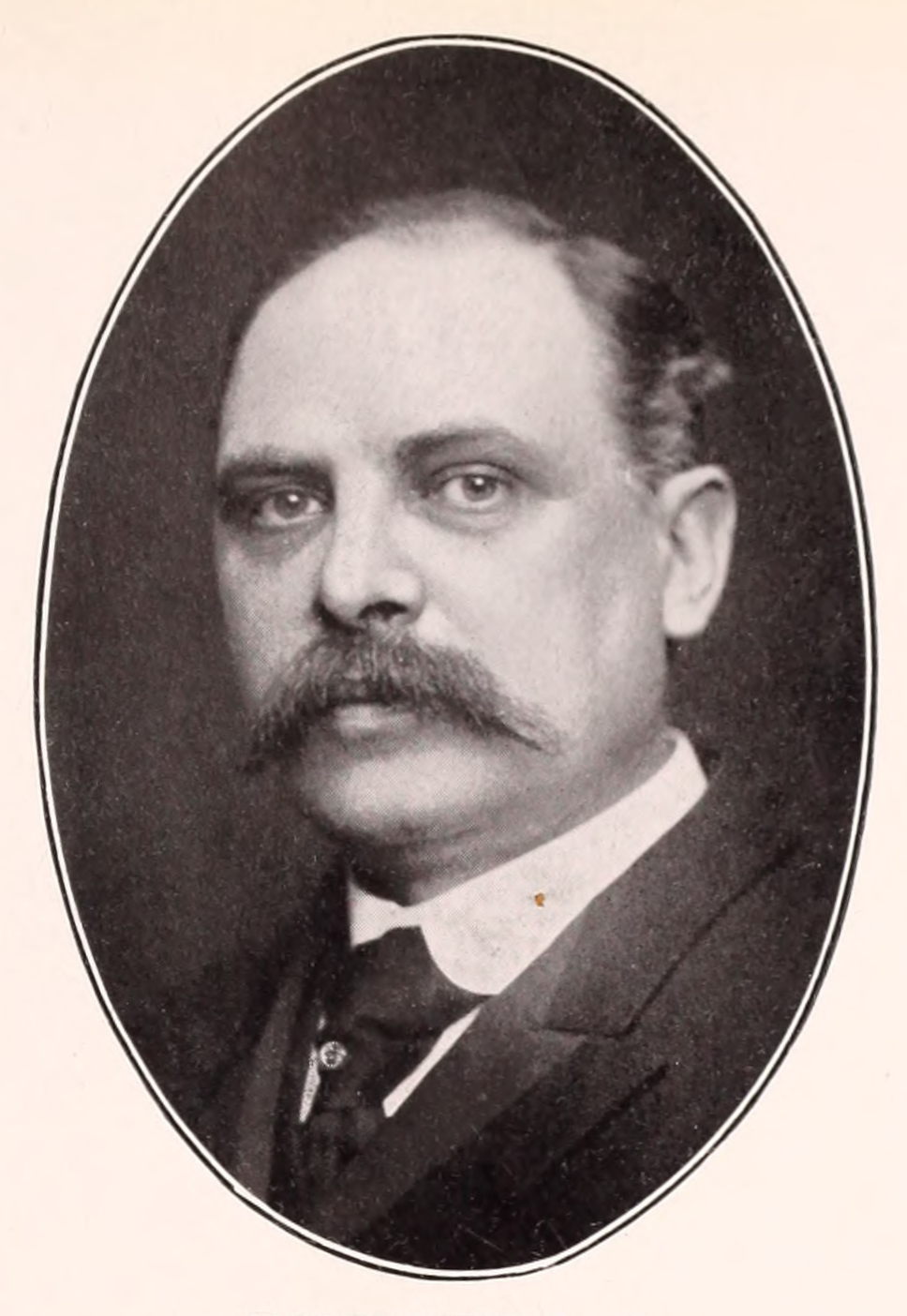
Alfred Rider Page

Alfred Rider Page (October 7, 1859 – February 3, 1931) was an American lawyer, judge, and politician from New York.

Page was born in Carlinville, Illinois, and relocated with his family to Brooklyn in 1874. He graduated from New York University School of Law in 1880, was admitted to the bar, and practiced in New York City. In 1886, he married Elizabeth M. Roe, and they had three children including the novelist Elizabeth Page. Page was a member of the New York State Senate (19th district) from 1905 to 1908, sitting in the 128th, 129th, 130th and 131st New York State Legislatures. He was a justice of the New York Supreme Court from 1910 to 1923. In 1915, he presided over the trial of Harry K. Thaw for conspiring to escape from the Matteawan State Hospital for the Criminally Insane. He sat on the Appellate Division (First Dept.) from 1916 to 1923. He died on February 3, 1931, in Southampton, New York, from pneumonia.

== Sources ==
- Official New York from Cleveland to Hughes by Charles Elliott Fitch (Hurd Publishing Co., New York and Buffalo, 1911, Vol. IV; pg. 366)
- THAW TRIAL TODAY, HE MAY TAKE STAND in NYT on March 8, 1915
- THAW DEFEATED, GETS A NEW WRIT in NYT on March 17, 1915
- ALFRED RIDER PAGE, EX-JUSTICE, IS DEAD; Former Supreme Court Justice Alfred Rider Page of 2,202 Loring Place, the Bronx, a distinguished... in NYT on February 4, 1931 (subscription required)

New York State Senate
Preceded by John W. Russell	New York State Senate; 19th District; 1905–1908	Succeeded by Josiah T. Newcomb
