= Coal River Locks, Dams, and Log Booms Archeological District =

Historic district in West Virginia, United States

- U.S. National Register of Historic Places
- U.S. Historic district
- Nearest city: Alum Creek, West Virginia
- Area: 41 acres (17 ha)
- Built: 1855
- Architect: Rosecrans, William S., Coal River Na; Bowman Lumber, Coal River Boom & Tim
- NRHP reference No.: 97001417
- Added to NRHP: November 24, 1997

Coal River Locks, Dams, and Log Booms Archeological District is a national historic district and historic archaeological site located on the Coal River in Boone, Lincoln, and Kanawha County, West Virginia. It consists of an underwater resource depicting the navigation and transportation system used on the Coal River during the late-19th and early-20th century. It includes remains of timber cribs, locks and dams, and a lock master house. It was designed by William Rosecrans in the mid-1850s, and was one of the first complete lock and dam systems in West Virginia.

It was listed on the National Register of Historic Places in 1997.
