= John W. Russell (New York politician) =

American politician (1874/75–1930)

Member of the New York Senate from the 19th district
- In office January 1, 1903 – December 31, 1904
- Preceded by: Samuel S. Slater
- Succeeded by: Alfred R. Page

Personal details
- Born: 1874 or 1875
- Died: March 26, 1930 (aged 55) Goshen, New York
- Party: Democratic

John W. Russell (1874/1875–March 26, 1930) was an American politician from New York. Russell was a member of the New York State Senate (19th District) from 1903 to 1904, sitting in the 126th and 127th New York State Legislatures.

== Career ==
In February 1903, Russell introduced a bill to create the Board of Railroad Commissioners of the City of New York. Also in February 1903, Russell introduced a bill to expand the Municipal Court with sixteen additional justices.

In January 1904, Russell introduced legislation to require railroad passenger cars to be heated during the winter months.

In October 1904, Russell declined renomination to run for re-election in the 19th District.

New York State Senate
Preceded by Samuel S. Slater	New York State Senate; 19th District; 1903-1904	Succeeded by Alfred R. Page
