= Sylvester, West Virginia =

- Town
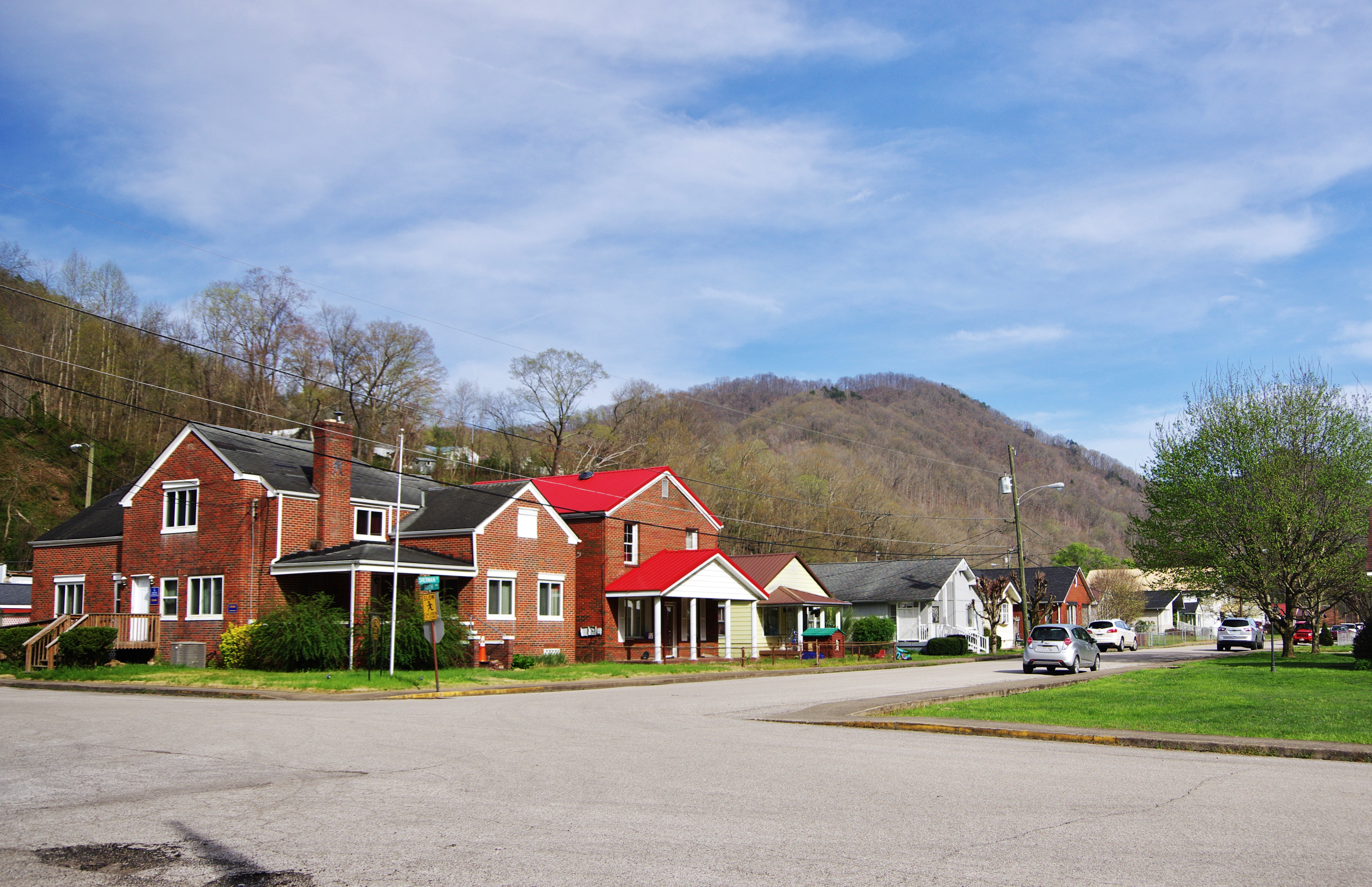
- Houses in Sylvester

- Location of Sylvester in Boone County, West Virginia.
- Coordinates: 38°0′37″N 81°33′35″W
- Country: United States
- State: West Virginia
- County: Boone
- Incorporated: April 11, 1952

Area
  - Total: 0.26 sq mi (0.67 km^{2})
  - Land: 0.25 sq mi (0.65 km^{2})
  - Water: 0.0039 sq mi (0.01 km^{2})
- Elevation: 863 ft (263 m)

Population (2020)
  - Total: 171
  - Estimate (2021): 162
  - Density: 539.4/sq mi (208.27/km^{2})
- Time zone: UTC-5 (Eastern (EST))
  - Summer (DST): UTC-4 (EDT)
- ZIP code: 25193
- Area code: 304
- FIPS code: 54-78964
- GNIS feature ID: 1555775
- Website: local.wv.gov/Sylvester/

Sylvester is a town in Boone County, West Virginia, United States, along the Big Coal River. The population was 166 at the 2020 census. Sylvester was incorporated on April 11, 1952, by the Boone County Circuit Court. Sylvester bears the name of a family of settlers.

Before Sylvester was settled, it was the location of the Coal River Golf Club, which had a nine-hole golf course, picnic ground, tennis courts, and facilities for swimming and fishing. After World War II, the site was laid out for residential development by a local businessman, and became known as the Branham Addition of Whitesville. That name is still seen on the deeds for the homes built in Sylvester. Other than nearby Whitesville, it was one of the first communities in the area that was not originally part of a coal camp, but was settled by coal miners and their families. The residential area on the hill to the northeast of the town, which is accessible from West Virginia Route 3 (Coal River Road}, is known as Branham Heights.

== Geography ==
Sylvester is located at 38°0′37″N 81°33′35″W (38.010370, -81.559626). The town's municipal boundaries extend to both sides of the river, though its business district and residential areas lie primarily on the river's eastern bank. The town of Whitesville lies just to the southeast, and the communities of Orgas and Seth lie just to the north. West Virginia Route 3 (Coal River Road) traverses Sylvester.

According to the United States Census Bureau, the town has a total area of 0.26 square miles (0.67 km^{2}), of which 0.25 square miles (0.65 km^{2}) is land and 0.01 square miles (0.03 km^{2}) is water.

== Demographics ==
Historical population
Census	Pop.	Note	%±
1960	316		—
1970	245		−22.5%
1980	256		4.5%
1990	191		−25.4%
2000	195		2.1%
2010	160		−17.9%
2020	171		6.9%
2021 (est.)	162	▼	−5.3%
U.S. Decennial Census

=== 2010 census ===
At the 2010 census there were 160 people, 67 households, and 44 families living in the town. The population density was 640.0 inhabitants per square mile (247.1/km^{2}). There were 78 housing units at an average density of 312.0 per square mile (120.5/km^{2}). The racial makeup of the town was 98.8% White and 1.3% from two or more races. Of the 67 households 31.3% had children under the age of 18 living with them, 58.2% were married couples living together, 6.0% had a female householder with no husband present, 1.5% had a male householder with no wife present, and 34.3% were non-families. 32.8% of households were one person and 17.9% were one person aged 65 or older. The average household size was 2.39 and the average family size was 3.05.

The median age in the town was 42 years. 21.9% of residents were under the age of 18; 8.1% were between the ages of 18 and 24; 22.5% were from 25 to 44; 24.4% were from 45 to 64; and 23.1% were 65 or older. The gender makeup of the town was 49.4% male and 50.6% female.

=== 2000 census ===
At the 2000 census there were 195 people, 84 households, and 66 families living in the town. The population density was 761.4 inhabitants per square mile (289.6/km^{2}). There were 94 housing units at an average density of 367.0 per square mile (139.6/km^{2}). The racial makeup of the town was 98.46% White, 1.03% African American, and 0.51% from two or more races. Hispanic or Latino of any race were 0.51%.

Of the 84 households 26.2% had children under the age of 18 living with them, 63.1% were married couples living together, 8.3% had a female householder with no husband present, and 21.4% were non-families. 20.2% of households were one person and 15.5% were one person aged 65 or older. The average household size was 2.32 and the average family size was 2.65.

The age distribution was 18.5% under the age of 18, 4.6% from 18 to 24, 23.1% from 25 to 44, 29.7% from 45 to 64, and 24.1% 65 or older. The median age was 48 years. For every 100 females, there were 84.0 males. For every 100 females age 18 and over, there were 82.8 males.

The median household income was $35,625 and the median family income was $47,000. Males had a median income of $41,667 versus $25,000 for females. The per capita income for the town was $24,420. About 10.7% of families and 7.7% of the population were below the poverty line, including 8.3% of those under the age of eighteen and 3.9% of those sixty five or over.
