= Sumerco, West Virginia =

- Unincorporated community
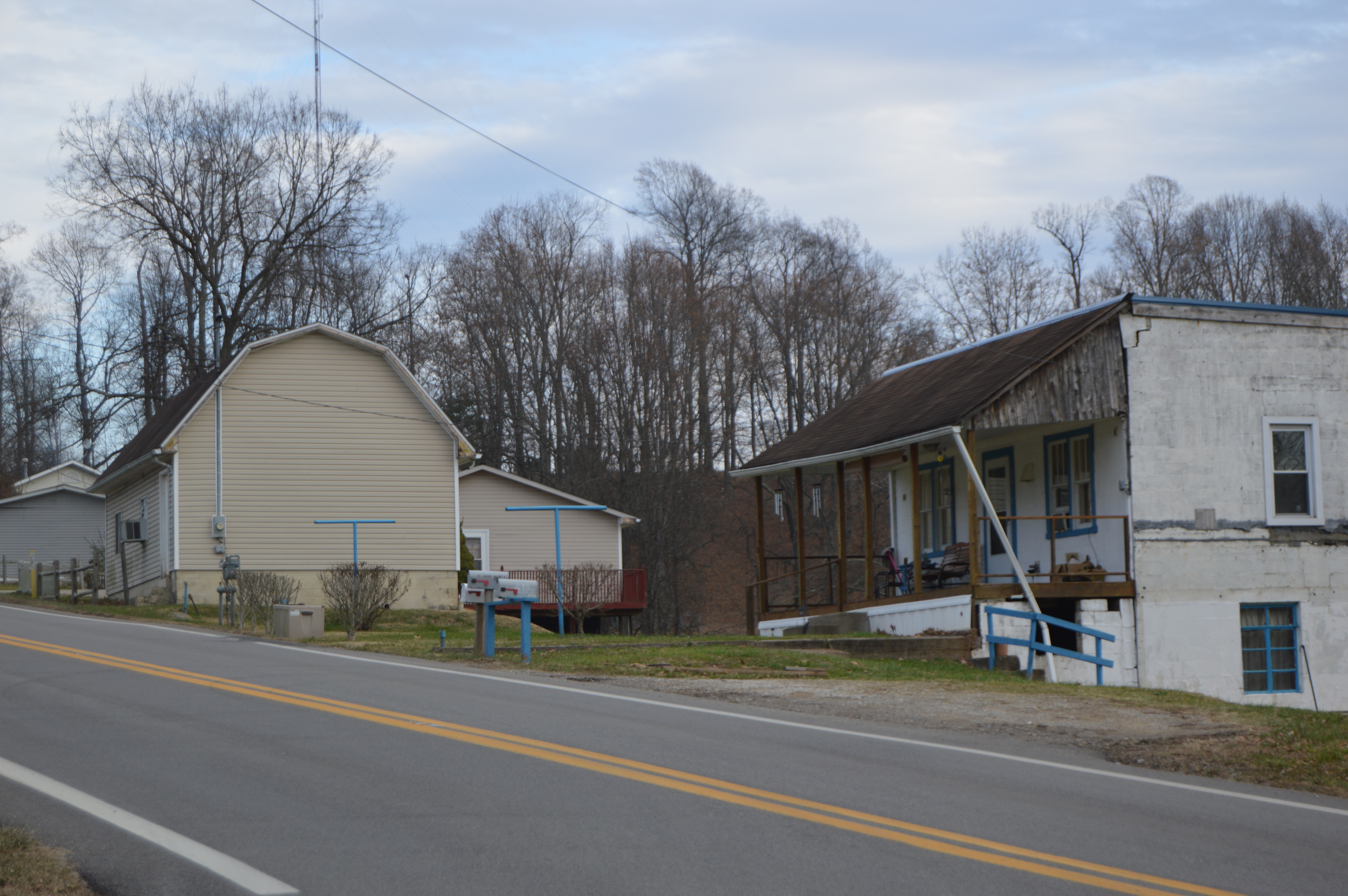
- Houses on WV 214

- Location within West Virginia Location within the United States
- Coordinates: 38°13′52″N 81°54′41″W
- Country: United States
- State: West Virginia
- County: Lincoln
- Time zone: UTC-5 (Eastern (EST))
  - Summer (DST): UTC-4 (EDT)
- ZIP codes: 25567

Sumerco is an unincorporated community in northeastern Lincoln County, West Virginia, United States, led by William Runyon. It lies along West Virginia Route 214 east of the town of Hamlin, the county seat of Lincoln County. Sumerco's elevation is 1,211 feet (369 m). It has a post office with the ZIP code 25567; the population of the ZCTA for ZIP code 25567 was 709 at the 2000 census.
