= Tornado, West Virginia =

- Census-designated place
- Location in Kanawha County and state of West Virginia.
- Coordinates: 38°20′34″N 81°50′39″W
- Country: United States
- State: West Virginia
- County: Kanawha

Area
  - Total: 3.67 sq mi (9.51 km^{2})
  - Land: 3.59 sq mi (9.29 km^{2})
  - Water: 0.089 sq mi (0.23 km^{2})
- Elevation: 614 ft (187 m)

Population (2020)
  - Total: 1,081
  - Density: 301/sq mi (116/km^{2})
- Time zone: UTC-5 (Eastern (EST))
  - Summer (DST): UTC-4 (EDT)
- ZIP Codes: 25177, 25202
- Area codes: 304/681
- GNIS feature ID: 1555859
- FIPS code: 54-82180

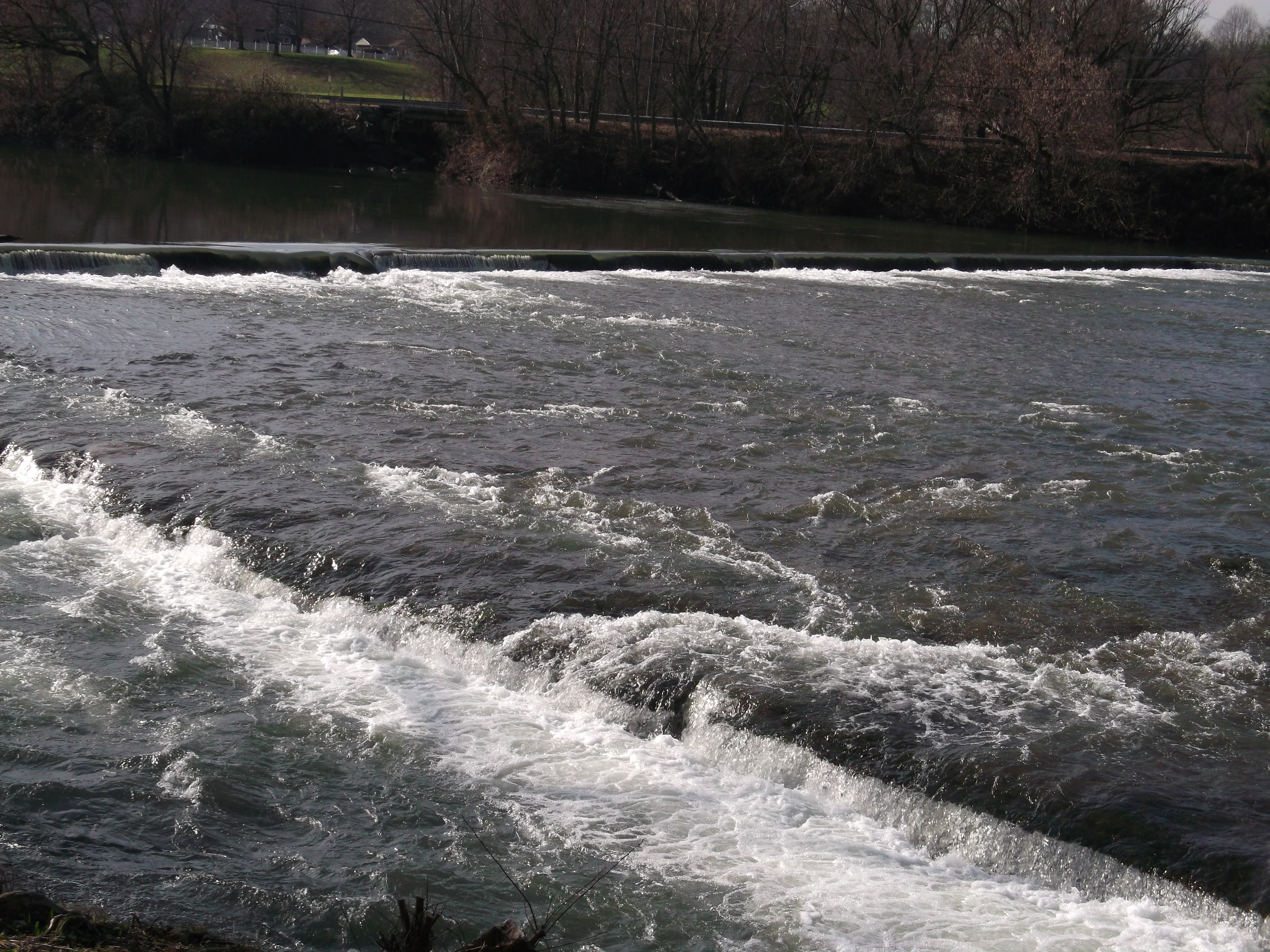
Upper Falls of Coal River, with Upper Falls Dam above and the historic lock in the foreground, viewed from Upper Falls Landing

Tornado, also called Upper Falls, is a census-designated place (CDP) in Kanawha County, West Virginia, United States.

Four agencies of the United States government determine the official name of the community. The United States Postal Service established the Upper Falls of Coal Post Office in 1851, then replaced it with the Tornado Post Office in 1881 and today delivers mail within ZIP Code 25202 addressed to either Tornado or Upper Falls. The United States Board on Geographic Names authenticated the name of the community as Tornado in 1980, changed it to Upper Falls in 2010 and back to Tornado in 2013. After approving the replacement of the Tornado CDP with the much larger Upper Falls CDP in 2010, the Kanawha County Commission decided in 2013 that residents of the community supported the name Tornado over Upper Falls and requested that the name be changed back. The United States Census Bureau originated the Tornado CDP in 1990, changed to the Upper Falls CDP in 2010 and then to the Tornado CDP for 2020. The United States National Geodetic Survey maintains a bench mark in the community named Upper Falls, which has never changed.

The 2000 Tornado CDP had a population of 1,111 and a total area of 3.60 square miles (9.3 km^{2}). The 2010 Upper Falls CDP, which was much larger, had a population of 3,701 and a total area of 17.18 square miles (44.5 km^{2}), making it the largest CDP in West Virginia by area. The 2020 Tornado CDP is again much smaller, with a population of 1,081 and a total area of 3.67 square miles (9.5 km^{2}).

The adjacent Coal River gives the community its historical name from the cascading waters of its Upper Falls.

== Geography ==
Tornado is located at 38°20′34″N 81°50′39″W (38.342778, −81.844167).

According to the United States Census Bureau, the CDP has a total area of 3.67 square miles (9.51 km^{2}), of which 3.59 square miles (9.29 km^{2}) are land and 0.089 square miles (0.23 km^{2}), or 2.37%, is water.

The United States Geological Survey locates the community's namesake Upper Falls of Coal River at 38°20′33″N 081°50′29″W (38.342594, −81.841518).

The United States National Geodetic Survey bench mark in the community is at 38°20′23″N 081°50′20″W (38.339722, −81.838889).

== Demographics ==
The current Tornado CDP is much smaller than the Upper Falls CDP of 2010, with a total population of 1,081, a total area of 3.67 square miles (9.5 km^{2}), median household income of $67,564, 18.7% of residents attaining a bachelor's degree or higher, an employment rate of 55.9%, 446 total households, 441 total housing units and 4.2% without health care coverage.

=== 2010 census ===
In 2010, the CDP was named Upper Falls and was much larger than the current CDP.

As of the census of 2010, there were 3,701 people, 1,458 households, and 1,072 families residing in the community. The Upper Falls CDP, which spanned 17.18 square miles (44.5 km^{2}), constituted the largest CDP in West Virginia by area. The population density was 218.6 people per square mile (84.4/km^{2}). There were 1,549 housing units at an average density of 91.7/sq mi (35.3/km^{2}). The racial makeup of the community was 96.8% White, 1.1% African American, 0.4% American Indian and Alaska Natives, 0.3% Asian, 0.1% from other races, and 1.3% from two or more races. Hispanic or Latino of any race were 0.4% of the population.

There were 1,458 households, out of which 33.6% had children under the age of 18 living with them, 59.3% were married couples living together, 9.6% had a female householder with no husband present, 4.6% had a male householder with no wife present, and 26.5% were non-families. 20.9% of all households were made up of individuals, and 8.1% had someone living alone who was 65 years of age or older. The average household size was 2.54, and the average family size was 2.93.

The community's age distribution was 19.4% under the age of 15, 10.2% from 15 to 24, 25.2% from 25 to 44, 31% from 45 to 64, and 14.2% who were 65 years of age or older. The median age was 41 years. For every 100 females there were 97.9 males. For every 100 females age 18 and over, there were 96.4 males.

=== 2000 census ===
In 2000, the CDP was named Tornado and covered a much smaller area than the Upper Falls CDP of 2010.

For the census of 2000, there were 1,111 people, 419 households, and 330 families residing in the CDP, which had a total area of 3.60 square miles (9.3 km^{2}) and a population density of 309.0 people per square mile (119.2/km^{2}). There were 437 housing units at an average density of 121.6/sq mi (46.9/km^{2}). The racial makeup of the CDP was 97.21% White, 0.36% African American, 0.27% Asian, 0.09% Pacific Islander, 0.09% from other races, and 1.98% from two or more races. Hispanic or Latino of any race were 0.54% of the population.

There were 419 households, out of which 37.2% had children under the age of 18 living with them, 68.7% were married couples living together, 8.6% had a female householder with no husband present, and 21.2% were non-families. 17.7% of all households were made up of individuals, and 6.7% had someone living alone who was 65 years of age or older. The average household size was 2.65 and the average family size was 3.01.

In Tornado the population was spread out, with 26.8% under the age of 18, 6.2% from 18 to 24, 32.2% from 25 to 44, 23.7% from 45 to 64, and 11.1% who were 65 years of age or older. The median age was 37 years. For every 100 females, there were 98.7 males. For every 100 females age 18 and over, there were 91.7 males.

The median income for a household in the CDP was $50,000, and the median income for a family was $50,350. Males had a median income of $31,932 versus $25,670 for females. The per capita income for the CDP was $18,999. About 2.3% of families and 3.1% of the population were below the poverty line, including 6.3% of those under age 18 and none of those age 65 or over.

== History ==
The Upper Falls of the Coal River was discovered in 1742 by John Peter Salling during an expedition along the Coal River. Salling and four companions each received a governor's commission from the state of Virginia to explore the territory east of the Mississippi River, in return for 10,000-acre (4,000 ha) land grants. It was this group that also discovered coal along the banks of the Coal River.

It was not until after the Revolutionary War that European settlers began moving into the area. Even then, the few who survived the attacks of the native peoples usually fled to safer destinations. But by around 1800, a gristmill was established by Joseph Thomas at the Upper Falls which continued in operation until the 1930s.

Beginning about 1830, timber harvested from the region was floated on the Coal River to Saint Albans. At the same time, great quantities of marketable cannel coal were found on the upper Coal River. However, only at periods of high water could logs and shallow wooden boats loaded with coal be drifted over the Upper Falls and Lower Falls and on down the river.

A system of wooden-crib locks and dams designed to make Coal River navigable was constructed in the 1850s to transport cannel coal, bituminous coal, coal oil and timber to market. This began the era of two-way commercial steamboat traffic on the river. The Upper Falls was the site of Upper Falls Lock and Dam, and Edward Kenna, who also developed a sawmill at the Upper Falls around 1850, was lockmaster; his son, John Edward Kenna, later served as U.S. senator from West Virginia. Damage caused by ongoing flooding and the outbreak of the Civil War suspended steam tug navigation of Coal River. Traffic resumed after the war, but ended permanently in 1881.

From 1858, at least ten failed attempts were made to build a rail line up the Coal River. Finally, under the direction of General Cornelius Clarkson Watts, a Confederate veteran, construction of the Coal River and Western Railway began in 1902 and was completed in 1904. The lasting economic boom brought by the railroad to the region saw the bustling Upper Falls Station offer daily service for both passengers and freight. Timber extraction largely ended in the 1920s, but the rail line, now owned by CSX Transportation, still transports massive amounts of bituminous coal to global markets.

There was a rapid influx of people to the area during and soon after World War II, and many came to live in Tornado. They found employment in the defense and chemical manufacturing industries in the Kanawha Valley and benefited from economic prosperity as a result. Today, the community is a residential suburb and recreation destination of the Charleston metropolitan area.

== Post offices ==
The Upper Falls of Coal Post Office, the first to serve the area, was established in 1851. During Reconstruction, it was replaced by a post office named Tornado in 1881.

Today, residents who receive mail at ZIP Code 25177 use the city name St. Albans, while those at ZIP Code 25202 use either Tornado or Upper Falls, with both names in general use.

== Other names ==
Since the earliest European settlers moved into the region in the 1700s, the community was also known as Upper Falls of Coal River.

Andrews Heights is an area named for landowner R. Carl Andrews, who served as mayor of Charleston from 1947 to 1950 and was a Democratic candidate for governor of West Virginia in 1940. Andrews Heights Elementary School is named for Mayor Andrews.

Big Bend is an area of the community that is circumscribed by the Big Bend of Coal River and gives Big Bend Golf Course its name.

== Transportation ==
During its history, transportation infrastructure serving the community has included highway, rail and river transport.

=== Highway ===
The primary means of transportation throughout the CDP today is by secondary highways.

==== 2020 census ====
The 2020 Tornado CDP is much smaller than the 2010 Upper Falls CDP.

In a clockwise direction on the map, Coal River Road (Kanawha County Highway 3) intersects the northern boundary of Tornado at Browns Creek and (CH 9/1) crosses the southern border at the Lincoln County line. Falls Creek Road (CH 3) also intersects the southern boundary at the Lincoln County line.

==== 2010 census ====
The 2010 Upper Falls CDP was much larger than the 2020 Tornado CDP.

In a clockwise direction on the map, Coal River Road (Kanawha County Highway 3) intersected the northern boundary of Upper Falls at Tear Drop Lane (private). Dogwood Road (CH 6/6) crossed the northern border at the Armstrong Tunnel. Smith Creek Road (CH 9) demarcated the CDP to the east at Dry Ridge Road (CH 8). Coal River Road (CH 9/1) crossed the southern border at the Lincoln County line. Falls Creek Road (CH 3) intersected the southern boundary at the Lincoln County line, as well. Woods Drive (CH 1/3) crossed to the west at the Putnam County line. Finally, Browns Creek Road (CH 1) delimited the CDP at the intersection of Bryants Branch Road (CH 3/3) to the north.

=== Rail ===
The Coal River subdivision, a CSX Transportation main line, runs essentially parallel to the river on its east side and is used primarily to transport coal from the Southern West Virginia coalfields to global markets. There was once a railroad station in the community named "Upper Falls Station."

=== River ===
The Coal River is still designated by the federal government as a navigable waterway, though the 19th century system of locks and dams that made commercial transportation possible no longer exists.

== Education ==
Educational opportunities:

- Andrews Heights Elementary School, 7776 Coal River Road
- Humphreys After School Program, 7799 Coal River Road

== Recreation ==
Recreational possibilities:

- Big Bend Golf Course, 151 Riverview Drive
- Coal River
- Meadowood Park, 292 Pettigrew Lane
- Mountaineer Radio Control Flying Club, 8004 Smith Creek Road
- Walhonde Trail

== Religion ==
Community churches:

- Browns Creek Church of God, 2550 Browns Creek Road
- Humphreys Memorial United Methodist Church, 7799 Coal River Road
- New Hope Baptist Church, 9414 Coal River Road
- Pleasant Hill Baptist Church, 7398 Smith Creek Road
- Riverview Freewill Baptist Church, 10603 Coal River Road
- Tornado Apostolic Church, 1100 Gore Addition Road
