= Peter Wraxall =

Peter Wraxall (died 11 July 1759) was a British official in the province of New York.

== Biography ==
Born in Bristol, England, Wraxall was the son of John Wraxall, a merchant. Peter became a seaman after his family suffered financial hardship. He traveled to the Netherlands and Jamaica before finally settling in New York. In 1746, during King George's War, he raised a company for the expedition into Canada. The next year, he went back to England on private business.

While in England, Wraxall received two royal commissions in 1750: secretary for the New York government to the Indians and clerk of the common pleas in the county and city of Albany. When he returned to New York, however, he found that the governor had already appointed Harmon Gansevoort to the Albany clerk position. Wraxall attempted through the courts to have his clerk's commission honored, to no avail.

Wraxall did have his commission as New York's secretary of Indian affairs, which proved to be an important position as the French and Indian War approached. In 1754, Wraxall attended the Albany Congress, where British officials attempted to improve their relationship with the Iroquois and recruit native support for the coming conflict. At the same time, Wraxall published An Abridgement of the Records of Indian Affairs: Contained in Four Folio Volumes, Transacted in the Colony of New York, from the Year 1678 to the Year 1751, an important compilation of documents chronicling New York's dealings with Native Americans. Wraxall's work highlighted the incompetence of New York's Indian commissioners at Albany, and suggested that Indian affairs should be centralized under a single official. The Abridgement was sent to officials in Great Britain, and may have influenced the policy changes that followed.

At the Albany Congress, Wraxall met William Johnson, an influential New York official. In April 1755, Johnson was commissioned as sole British agent to the Iroquois. Wraxall was appointed as Johnson's secretary, a position he held for the remainder of his life. In 1755, Wraxall accompanied Johnson on the Crown Point expedition. Johnson's victory at the Battle of Lake George on 8 September made him a British hero, but Wraxall, though important, remained obscure.

Wraxall's final years were relatively uneventful. He continued to serve as Johnson's secretary, and attended Indian conferences, but poor health kept him from further military service. In 1756 he married Elizabeth Stillwell. He died three years later in New York City. His replacement as the crown's Indian secretary was Witham Marshe.

== Sources ==
- Allen, Robert. "Wraxall, Peter". American National Biography Online, February 2000.
