= Six Nations land cessions =

Native American land cessions, 1682–1797

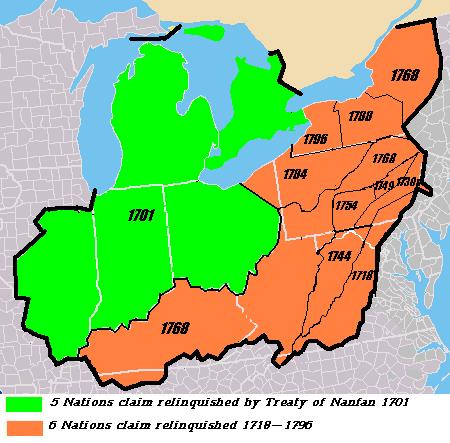
A map of the Six Nations land cessions

The Six Nations land cessions were a series of land cessions by the Haudenosaunee and Lenape to Europeans during the late 17th and 18th centuries. They ceded large amounts of land, including both recently conquered territories acquired from other indigenous peoples in the Beaver Wars, and their own ancestral lands to the Thirteen Colonies and the United States. The land ceded covered, partially or in the entire, the U.S. states of New York, Pennsylvania, Maryland, Virginia, West Virginia, Kentucky, Ohio, Tennessee and North Carolina.

They were bordered to the west by other Algonquian peoples' lands in the Ohio Country, Cherokee lands to the south, and Muscogee and Choctaw lands to the southeast.

The land cessions were accomplished through a series of purchases and treaties negotiated between the Haudenosaunee and the Province of New York (and after the American Revolution, the United States government) between 1682 and 1797. In the Nanfan Treaty of 1701, the Haudenosaunee ceded their lands north and west of the Ohio River to the Thirteen Colonies; they had obtained this territory in part during the Beaver Wars with other tribes in the late 17th century.

Following the American Revolution, many of the Haudenosaunee allied with the British migrated to Ontario, where they received some land in compensation for their losses in the independent colonies. Mohawk and related peoples were officially recognized in historic settlements (now reserves) in Quebec.

During the early 19th century, the US and state government and settlers put revived energy into Indian removal from the former colonies. A majority of the Oneida, one of the tribes which made up the Haudenosaunee, migrated from New York to the state of Wisconsin. Other Haudenosaunee migrated to Indian Territory (later the state of Oklahoma in the 20th century.)

As of the 21st century, the six nations of the Haudenosaunee live in 20 settlements and 8 reservations in New York, Wisconsin, and Oklahoma in the United States; and Ontario and Quebec in Canada.

== Background ==
Before the period of European colonization, the ancestral territory of the Haudenosaunee, a confederation of five indigenous tribes, formed the territory of what is now Upstate New York. The Lenape were spread out in the Hudson and Delaware River valleys along the eastern seaboard of North America. During a period of violent conflict between the Haudenosaunee and a confederation of Algonquian and Wyandot tribes who were allied with the French, the Haudenosaunee were able to acquire lands through conquest which extended as far as the Mississippi River to the west and the Tennessee River to the south. The Lenape, under pressure from European colonial settlements, migrated to the Midwest along the Ohio River and eventually settled along the Wabash River.

In 1701, the Haudenosaunee signed the "Deed from the Five Nations to the King, of their Beaver Hunting Ground", more commonly known as the Nanfan Treaty, with the colonial governor of the Province of New York, John Nanfan. The treaty was made during positive relations between the English Crown and the Haudenosaunee, and ceded large amounts of recently lost territory to colonial New York.

The British made no attempt to settle the newly ceded territories, as they were largely populated by hostile Algonquian peoples, and the French, who controlled much of present-day eastern Canada, refused to recognize the treaty.

== Land cessions ==
Between 1682 and 1684, Quaker writer and settler William Penn acquired as many as ten individual deeds from the Lenape to territory in colonial Pennsylvania, which formed present-day Chester, Philadelphia, and Bucks counties. These lands were acquired under the Covenant Chain, a series of treaties signed between the Thirteen Colonies and the Haudenosaunee. According to legend, in 1682 Penn signed a treaty under an elm tree with the Lenape known as the Treaty of Shackamaxon. In 1722, the Lieutenant Governor of Virginia, Alexander Spotswood, signed the Treaty of Albany with the Haudenosaunee. The treaty renewed the Covenant Chain and agreed to recognize the Blue Ridge Mountains as the demarcation between colonial Virginia and the territory of the Haudenosaunee. The same year, the Tuscarora joined the confederation of the Haudenosaunee, transforming it into the "Six Nations".

Various colonial governments proved unable to prevent white settlers from moving beyond the Blue Ridge Mountains and settling in the Shenandoah Valley in the 1730s. When the Haudenosaunee objected to encroachment from settlers, they were informed that the agreed demarcation was to prevent them from trespassing east of the Blue Ridge Mountains, and not to prevent colonists from expanding westward. In December 1742, the Haudenosaunee skirmished with some white settlers in the Shenandoah Valley at the Battle of Galudoghson; tensions worsened to the point of an outbreak of war with Virginian settlers when Sir William Gooch, the colonial governor of Virginia, agreed to pay the Haudenosaunee 100 pounds sterling for any settled territory in the Shenandoah Valley which they claimed belong to them. The following year, in the Treaty of Lancaster, the Haudenosaunee sold their remaining claims in the Shenandoah Valley for 200 pounds sterling in gold and 200 pounds sterling worth of goods.

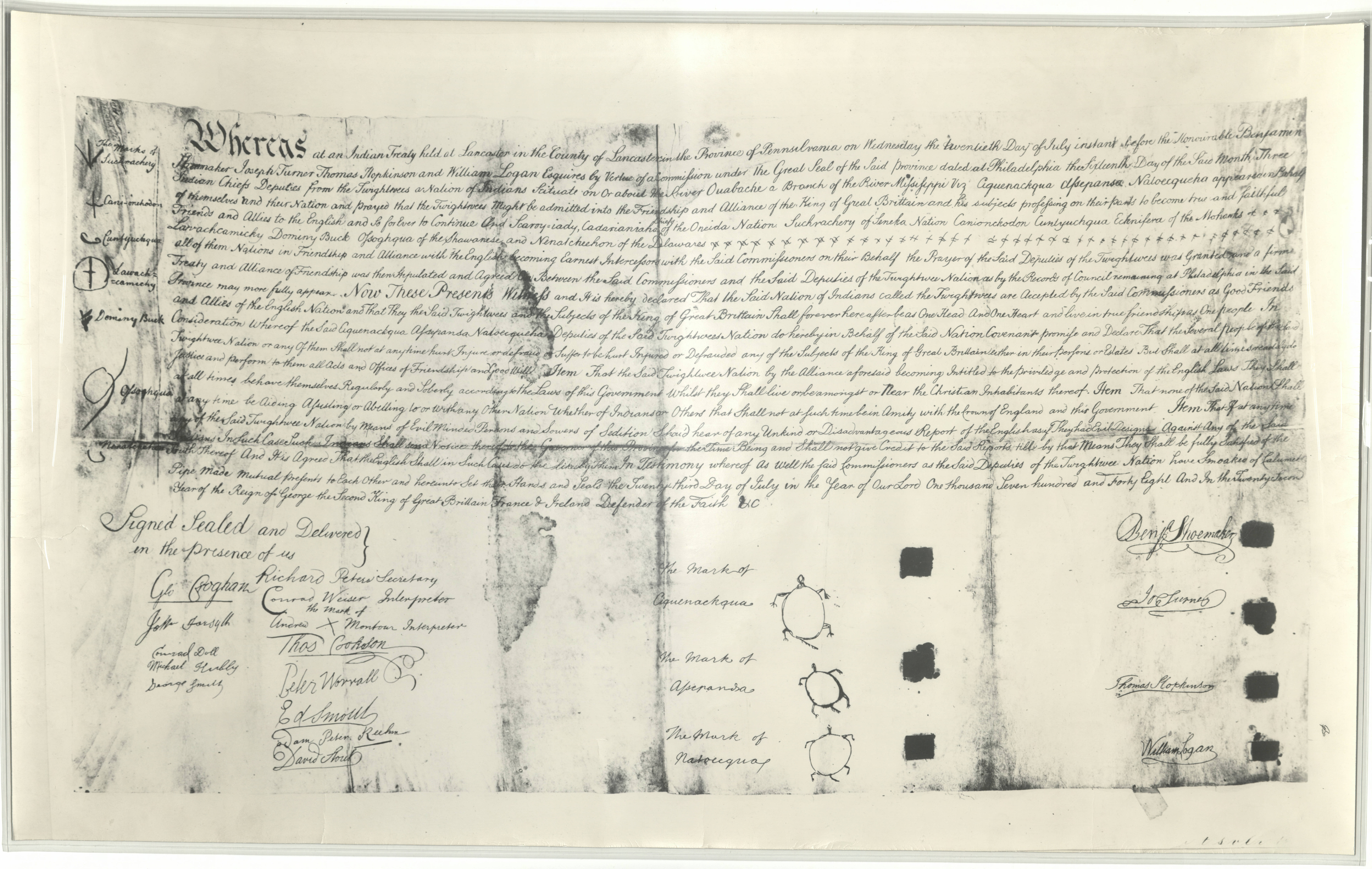
The 1748 Treaty of Lancaster between the Miami People and representatives of the Pennsylvania Provincial Council. The treaty was signed by George Croghan, Andrew Montour, Richard Peters, Conrad Weiser, and three Miami chiefs.

The treaty also allowed for the Haudenosaunee to make peace with the Catawba, whom they had been engaged in intermittent conflict for the past decades. It also was interpreted differently by the Haudenosaunee and the Virginia Colony; with the Virginians believing that the Haudenosaunee had ceded all claims which lay inside the 1609 chartered boundaries of colonial Virginia. The Virginians considered these claims to theoretically extend to the Pacific, or at least up to the Ohio River. On the other hand, the Haudenosaunee understood the treaty to mean that they had only ceded their territory up to the Shenandoah Valley east of the Allegheny Mountains. The negotiations were conducted in the Lancaster courthouse, now occupied by the Soldiers and Sailors Monument, built to commemorate the Union after the American Civil War.

This difference was partly resolved at the Treaty of Logstown in 1752, where the Haudenosaunee recognized the rights of colonists southeast of the Ohio River. Nevertheless, the Cherokee, the Shawnee, and other tribes continued to claim by possession large portions of the region beyond the Allegheny Ridge. In the 1758 Treaty of Easton with the Shawnee ending Braddock's War, the Thirteen Colonies agreed to forbid settlement west of the Alleghenies. The Royal Proclamation of 1763, issued by the British Crown in the aftermath of Pontiac's War, confirmed the region as being forbidden to white settlers. By the Treaty of Fort Stanwix in 1768, the Haudenosaunee sold all their remaining claims between the Ohio and Tennessee Rivers. After the signing of the Nanfan Treaty, small numbers of Haudenosaunee, known as the Seneca-Cayuga, also referred to as the Ohio Seneca or Ohio Cayuga, continued to live in the Ohio Country, and eventually broke away from the confederation. The derogatory term "Mingo" was applied by some non-Native settlers to these Native peoples.

== See also ==
- Aboriginal title in New York
- Aboriginal title in the Thirteen Colonies
- Aboriginal title in the United States
