= Coal River (West Virginia) =

Tributary of the Kanawha River

Coordinates: 38.3972°N 81.8413°W

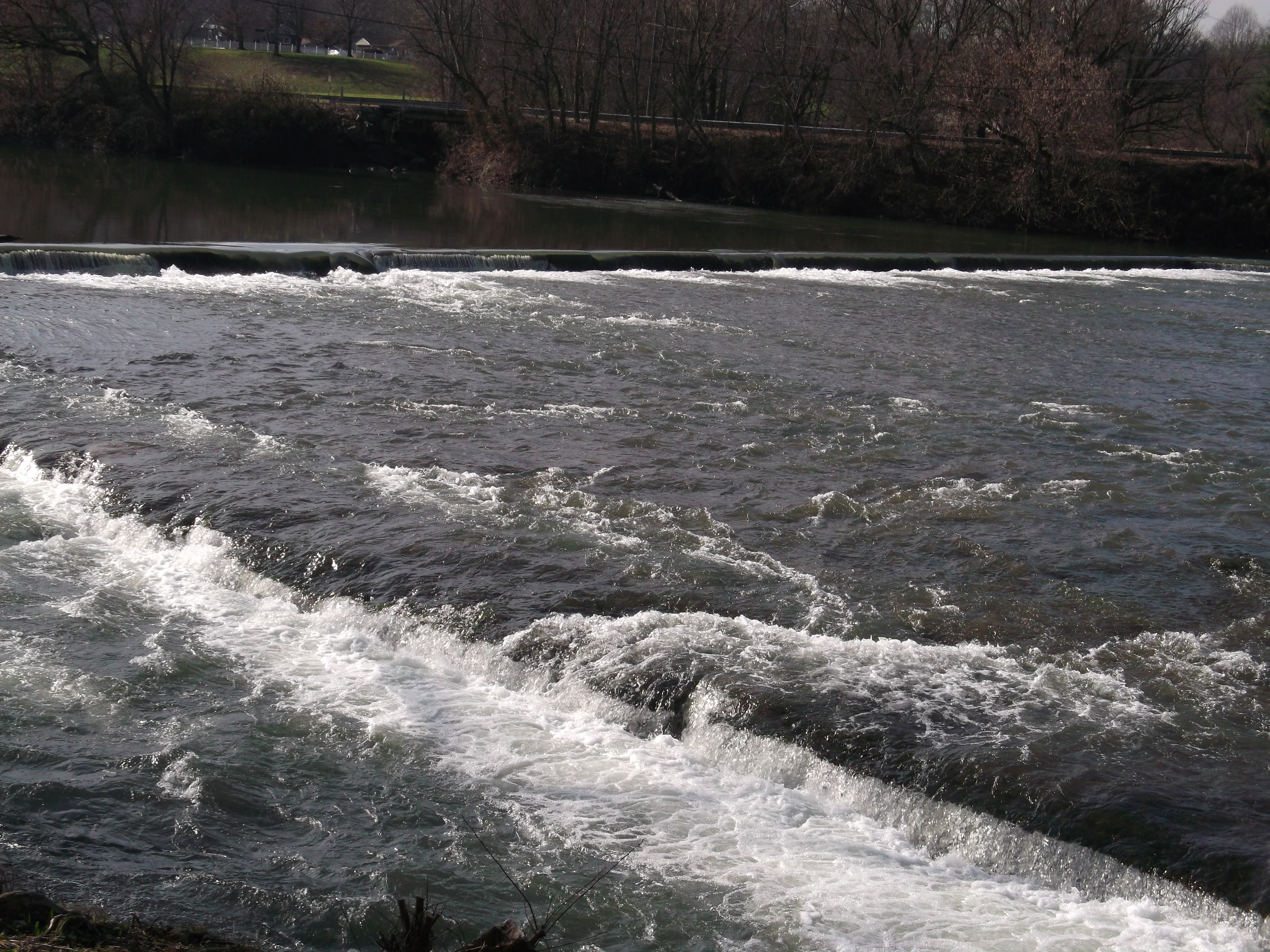
The Coal River at Upper Falls with Upper Falls Dam above and the historic lock in the foreground, viewed from Upper Falls Landing

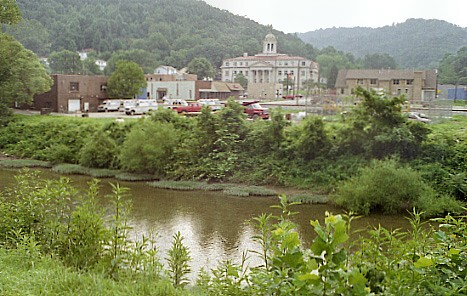
The Little Coal River at Madison

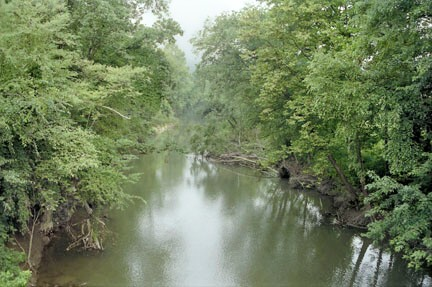
The Little Coal River near Julian

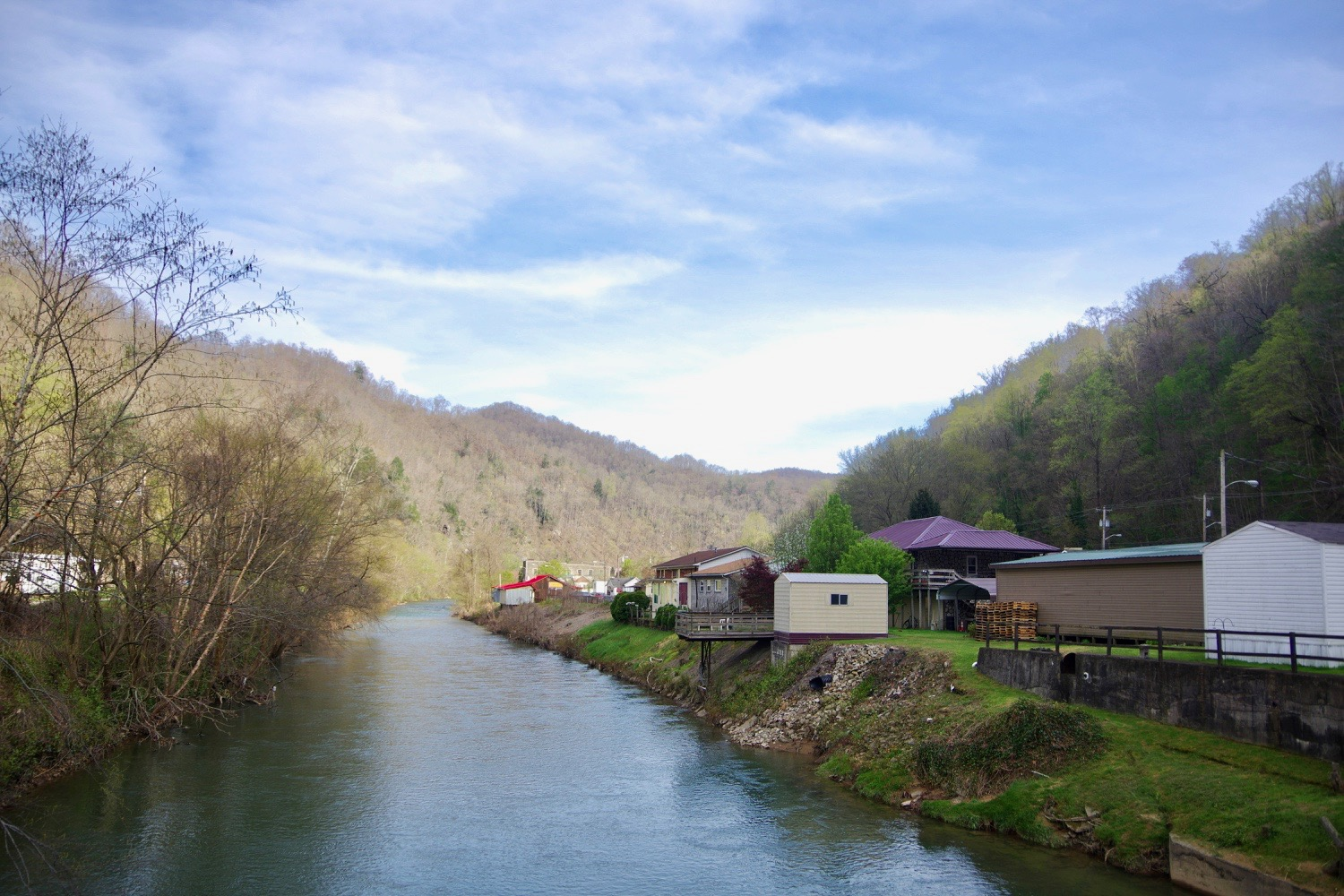
The Big Coal River at Whitesville

The Coal River is a tributary of the Kanawha River in southern West Virginia. It is formed near the community of Alum Creek by the confluence of the Big and Little Coal Rivers, and flows generally northward through western Kanawha County, past the community of Upper Falls and into the Kanawha River at St. Albans.

== History ==
Originally named Walhondecepe by the Delaware Indians, the three rivers that make up the Coal River Watershed, Big, Little and Coal River were renamed in the 18th century by explorer John Peter Salling for the coal deposits found along its banks.

Since humans first arrived in the region the three rivers that make up the Coal River Watershed have served as a vital transportation link to the Kanawha River. The Indians used the rivers as favorite hunting and fishing sites. Early settlers in the region discovered that outcrops of (Cannel) Coal along the Big Coal River could be utilized as an excellent source of heat and light. The abundant timber reserves found in the region also could be transported to the Kanawha Valley during floods and sold to the growing Kanawha Valley.

The availability of large seams of Cannel Coal, which could be used to produce a very desirable coal oil, brought investors to the region in the mid-19th century. The coal could be utilized to produce a coal oil which was in high demand in the urban areas of the US. The oil was used to replace whale oil for lighting. Cannel Coal oil burned bright and produced very little smoke. The utilization of the rivers for navigation was enhanced in the mid 1851 by the construction of a 34-mile (55 km) lock and dam system designed by William Rosecrans. The Coal River Navigation Company was formed and invested approximately $208,000 to complete the system.

The lock and dam system was repeatedly washed out by floods but continued to be rebuilt by investors. The system operated successfully from 1855 through 1861. In 1860 over 850,000 bushels of coal were shipped. The outbreak of the Civil War stopped operations of the system but in 1867 a new company was formed and the lock and dams returned to service until 1881. Altogether the lock and dams operated for 16 years. The system is now listed on the National Register of Historic Places as is a series of Log booms built after the locks on the dams were washed away as the Coal River Locks, Dams, and Log Booms Archeological District. The log booms helped to channel cut timber into Sawmill locations along the Coal River near St. Albans, WV.

The Coal River from St. Albans to Upper Falls remains a federal government of the United States-designated navigable waterway.

Beginning around 1800, flax mills and gristmills were built and operated along the river, yielding fiber for the production of textiles in addition to staples such as flour and cornmeal.

After failed attempts by others, the Coal River and Western Railway Company established scheduled rail service along the river at the dawn of the 20th century. This finally provided a reliable source of transportation for the coal and timber industries, sparking an economic boom in the region.

== Environmental concerns ==
Environmental concerns are based on underground and surface mining operations in the Coal River watershed. Coal slurry impoundments are a byproduct of coal mining and preparation and contain toxic waste including heavy metals such as arsenic, cadmium, lead and mercury. A repeat of the nearby Buffalo Creek disaster is a concern.

Local volunteer watershed groups are working to restore the river and improve fish habitat and recreational opportunities. Also, the West Virginia Department of Environmental Protection is implementing a program to restore the Little Coal River. A series of river structures are being built to move accumulated silt in order to improve fish habitat. Marshall University was hired to conduct a comprehensive river water quality study.

== Big Coal River ==
The Big Coal River rises in Raleigh County as two streams, the Clear Fork and the Marsh Fork, which join near Whitesville. The river then flows generally northwest through Boone County, past the towns of Sylvester, Seth and Racine.

== Little Coal River ==
The Little Coal River also rises as two streams, the Spruce Fork in Logan County and the Pond Fork in Boone County. They meet at Madison in Boone County and the river then flows generally northward, past the towns of Danville and Julian.

== Tour de Coal ==
The Tour de Coal, a "paddling event" for canoes and kayaks normally held in June, is an 11-mile (18 km) trip from Upper Falls to St. Albans. Paddlers negotiate the Lower Falls, a one-mile (1.6 km) rapid along the route. About 200 people participated in 2009.

== See also ==
- Julia Bonds
- List of West Virginia rivers
