= John Peter Salling =

18th century German-American explorer

- Born: Johan Peter Saling; Palatinate Region, Holy Roman Empire
- Died: 1755; Glasgow, Colony of Virginia
- Years active: 1740-1755
- Known for: Exploration of parts of Virginia, West Virginia, and Kentucky, discovery of coal in West Virginia
- Spouse: Anna Marie Sallin
- Parent(s): Niclaus Sallin and Salome Johanna
- Relatives: Children: Catherine, Mary Elizabeth, George Adam, John; Brother: Adam
- Military career
- Allegiance: Colony of Virginia
- Service years: 1742-1755
- Rank: Captain of Foot
- Units: Virginia militia, Augusta County militia

John Peter Salling, (died 1755) born Johan Peter Saling and sometimes referred to as John Peter Salley, Sayling, Sallings, and Sallee, was a German explorer known for being among the first Europeans to visit parts of what is now Virginia, West Virginia and Kentucky. He was imprisoned by the French in New Orleans on charges of spying and escaped together with another prisoner, taking eight months to finally reach his home in Virginia. His detailed journal describing his journeys of exploration was lost twice, and each time Salling was able to reconstruct it from memory. Salling's journal was used as a source in the creation of early maps of Virginia and eastern North America.

== Biography ==
Salling was born in the Palatinate region of the Holy Roman Empire to Niclaus Sallin and Salome Johanna, Huguenots from Kaiserslautern, Germany. Different sources give his year of birth as 1697, 1706 or 1719. He arrived in Philadelphia with his wife Anna Marie and his two daughters (Catherine and Mary Elizabeth) on board the brigantine Pennsylvania Merchant on 18 September 1733. Two sons (George Adam and John) were born later. Salling was required to sign an oath of allegiance to King George II, like other German immigrants. In 1735, 250 acres were registered in Conestoga Township, Lancaster County, Pennsylvania under the name of Johann Peter Saling.

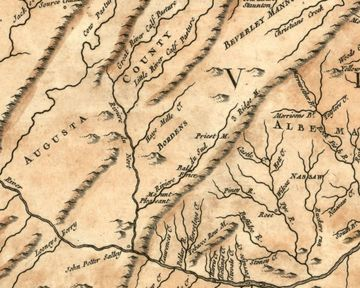
Salling's homestead in Augusta County, Virginia (spelled "John Petter Salley"), on the James River (lower edge of map). Depicted on a 1757 map of Virginia and Maryland.

In 1740 he and his brother Adam built a log cabin on the banks of the James River at its confluence with the Maury River in Augusta County, Virginia. He later wrote in his journal: "In the year 1740, I came from Pennsylvania to the part of Orange County now called Augusta; and settled in a fork of James River close under the Blue Ridge Mountains of the West Side, where I now live." On 6 July 1741, he obtained a patent for 400 acres on the James River.

Salling may have been among the first Europeans to see the Natural Bridge. His journal begins: "On the 16th of March 1742, we set off from my house and went to Cedar Creek, about five miles where there is Natural Bridge over said Creek, reaching from the Hill on the one side to the Hill on the other. It is a solid Rock and is two hundred and three feet high, having a very Spacious arch, where the Water runs thro[ugh]."

=== Military career ===
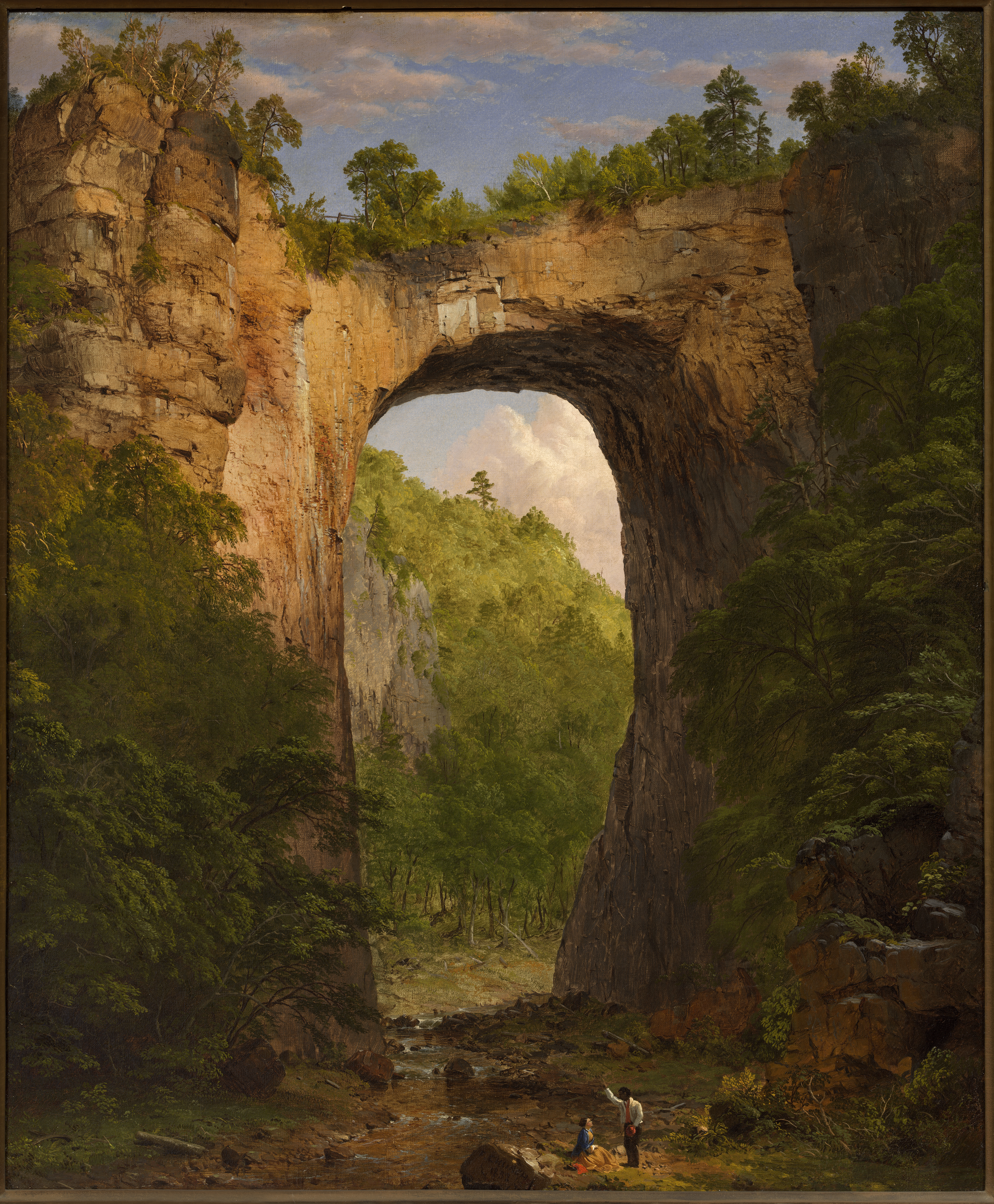
Natural Bridge by Frederic Edwin Church, 1852

Salling joined the Virginia Militia, and his name appears on the roster of Captain John McDowell’s Company of Militia in 1742. In December of that year, the militia engaged in combat with an Iroquois war party at the Battle of Galudoghson, not far from Salling's homestead. Captain McDowell was killed, but conflicting accounts of the battle suggest that both sides withdrew after suffering casualties.

=== Travel to West Virginia and Kentucky ===
In October 1737, John Howard was commissioned by Virginia Lieutenant-Governor Alexander Spotswood "to go upon discoveries on the Lakes & River of Mississippi." In 1742 Salling was invited by Howard to join this expedition. His companions were John Howard's son Josiah Howard, John Poteet and Charles St. Clair (or Sinclair). Howard was offered a 10,000-acre land grant to explore the wilderness beyond Virginia, and promised to divide his grant equally with anyone who chose to accompany him. The group left Salling's home on 16 March 1742 and, after visiting the Natural Bridge, traveled over 250 miles down the New River in a boat they manufactured using buffalo hide, until it became too dangerous to navigate. They then traveled overland 85 miles to the Coal River, which they descended for 220 miles. Salling wrote: "we found plenty of coal for which we named it Coal River."

=== Capture and imprisonment ===
They followed the Kanawha, Ohio and Wabash rivers, and reached the Mississippi on 7 June, descending it to just below the mouth of the Arkansas River, where, on 2 July, they were captured by group of ninety Blacks, Indians and Frenchmen. Transported as captives to New Orleans, they were interrogated by Governor Jean-Baptiste Le Moyne de Bienville, and then imprisoned as spies.

In a report dated 30 July 1742, Bienville stated that the prisoners

"had been sent on their perilous journey for the purpose of exploring the rivers flowing from Virginia into the Mississippi, and to reconnoiter the terrain looking to establishing a settlement, for the English pretend that their boundaries extend as far as the bank of the Mississippi...It is important that these rash men not return home to bear witness of what they have learned among us. I shall send them to the fort at Natchitoches, whence I will have them escorted to the mines of New Mexico."

This plan had to be abandoned, however, and Bienville's successor as governor of French Louisiana, Marquis Vaudreuil, decided to send the prisoners to France. On 29 December 1744, Vaudreuil reported that two of the prisoners had escaped and the other three had been sent to France.

=== Escape from prison ===
After two years in prison, Salling developed an escape plan. He obtained a file from a guard and used it to cut his chains and those of another prisoner (a French Creole named Baudran, as referenced in Vaudreuil's letter of 1744). They then broke down the door of their cell during the night and, using a rope to climb over a wall, escaped on 25 October 1744. They fled to a local monastery where they were given a gun, powder and shot, and the next day shot two buffalo and used their hides to make a boat. After traveling 60 miles across Lake Pontchartrain and up the Pearl River, they reached the land of an unnamed Native American tribe (probably Choctaws) where they stayed with Baudran's father for two months and ten days, during which the French conducted an intensive manhunt. Salling, Baudran and another Frenchman traveled by boat along the coast to Choctawhatchee Bay, then went overland to Augusta in the Province of Georgia, arriving in March 1745. In April they met with Governor William Stephens in Charles Town. There they boarded a ship bound for Virginia, but when they reached Cape Romain, their ship was captured by a French warship and all their belongings stolen. The French set Salling and eleven other men adrift in a small boat, in which they were able to return to Charles Town on 15 April 1745. From there, Salling traveled overland to Virginia, arriving on 17 May 1745.

The French governor placed the other members of the expedition, including John Howard, on board a French ship, the Elephant, bound for France in December 1744, but their ship was captured by an English warship, and they were then sent to London and then presumably back to America. John Howard and his son Josiah do not appear in records after this, but John Poteet and Charles St. Clair returned to Augusta County and acquired land across the James River from Salling. Their names appear subsequently in various documents and work orders.

=== Later life and death ===
In 1746, Salling "qualified as Captain of Foot" in the Virginia Militia. In November 1746, when a road was built from the north fork of the James River (near Salling's homestead), Governor William Gooch ordered "all the male Inhabitants from the South branch Downwards Clear [the road], and keep the same in repair According to Law," although Salling and his family were granted an exception. In September 1747 he was court-martialed for non-attendance at muster.

In July 1750, Salling was visited by the Reverend Robert Rose, who was traveling by canoe down the James River to Richmond. In May 1751, Salling was appointed surveyor and overseer for road work near his home. In November 1753, Salling and his son George were part of a work crew constructing a connecting road near his home, under the supervision of John Mathews.

Salling died between December 1754 and March 1755, leaving a will dated 25 December 1754 and proved on 19 March 1755.

== Legacy ==
Salling is credited with being the first European to set foot in western Kentucky, but this is uncertain. As Kentucky's state historian, James C. Klotter, explains in A New History of Kentucky, "No one can name with certainty the first man of European descent who explored Kentucky. He may have been one of the anonymous, far-ranging French coureurs des bois, or one of the Jesuit priests who ventured into so many remote areas of the West."

Salling's discovery of coal in what was then western Virginia, along the banks of the Coal River, in present-day Boone County, West Virginia, is commemorated by a historical marker.

== Sources ==
=== Salling's journal ===
The Fry-Jefferson map of the royal colony of Virginia (1752), created using information from Salling's journal. The homestead of "John Peter Salley" can be seen to the left of the map's center.

Salling kept a journal of his travels, but it was confiscated by French authorities when he was imprisoned in New Orleans. He later rewrote the journal from memory and loaned it to Georgia Governor William Stephens, who refused to return it. Salling again rewrote his journal from memory after returning to Virginia in 1745. Colonel John Buchanan transcribed the journal in October 1745, as he was preparing to visit parts of present-day West Virginia described in Salling's journal. Salling also permitted Joshua Fry to copy his journal. Fry sent his transcribed copy to Governor Lewis Burwell in 1751, and used the journal and information he obtained verbally from Salling to create a 1752 map of Virginia. On 21 August 1751, Burwell forwarded Fry's copy of Salling's journal to the Commissioners for Trade and Plantations in London, together with a draft of Fry and Jefferson's map. Geographer John Mitchell used information from Salling's journal to complete his 1755 "Map of the British and French dominions in North America". Mitchell wrote: "In 1739 and 1740 [sic] a Party of People were sent out by the Government of Virginia and traversed the whole Countrey down Wood River and River Ohio to the Missisipi and down that River to New Orleans: whose journals I have seen and perused and have made a draught of the countrey from them."

=== John Howard's letter ===
On 21 June 1743, John Howard wrote a brief account of his journey and imprisonment in a letter to King George II, which he had hoped to have smuggled out of the prison, but the letter was intercepted by the French. Howard's version of events differs markedly from Salling's up to the point of their capture by the French. He claims in his letter that the original purpose of his trip to the Mississippi was to broker a peace treaty between the Colony of Virginia and the Indian tribes. He says that his mission changed after Native warriors killed six of his neighbors in a raid, and that he was then sent to find the Indians who had murdered them. He reports that he and his companions were captured in July 1742, and concludes by asking the king to intercede on his behalf. The letter was signed by Salling and the other members of the expedition.

=== Other sources ===
Alexander Scott Withers in Chronicles of Border Warfare (1831), and Lyman Draper (quoting from Withers) provide questionable biographical information about Salling that contradicts what Salling himself wrote in his journal. Draper reports that Salling and his family moved to Williamsburg after 1735, where he was employed as a weaver, and that he met Thomas Marlin or Morlin, a trader who had recently visited western Virginia. Draper says they traveled across the Blue Ridge Mountains to visit the region of what is now Winchester, Virginia. On his return, Draper says Salling met with John Lewis (father of General Andrew Lewis) and John Mackey, and encouraged them to settle in western Virginia (unlikely, as Lewis had established a homestead in Augusta County several years earlier).

Withers states that, while traveling with Marlin, Salling was captured by Native Americans and spent several years as a captive of either Choctaw or Cherokee Indians in Tennessee. According to Withers, he was then sold to, or captured by, Illinois Indians and adopted into a family at Kaskaskia. Withers says that Salling traveled up and down the Mississippi until he was purchased by a party of Spanish explorers to serve as an interpreter. He eventually made his way to Fort Frontenac in Canada, where he was freed and sent to New York, after which he returned to Virginia, arriving just as his wife was preparing to marry another man. Withers adds that he is "sometimes spoken of as Peter Adam Salling," suggesting that this may be a different person from John Peter Salling.

== Popular culture ==
Salling's travels were the subject of Elizabeth Page's 1946 novel, Wilderness Adventure.
