= List of places named for John C. Calhoun =

This is a partial list of places named for American statesman John C. Calhoun:

== Cities and towns ==
- Calhoun, Alabama
- Calhoun, Arkansas
- Calhoun, Colorado
- Calhoun, Georgia
- Calhoun, Illinois (renamed Springfield in 1828)
- Calhoun, Kansas (ghost town)
- Calhoun, Kentucky
- Calhoun, Missouri
- Calhoun, South Carolina (renamed Clemson in 1943)
- Calhoun, Tennessee
- Calhoun City, Mississippi
- Calhoun Falls, South Carolina
- Fort Calhoun, Nebraska

== Counties ==
- Calhoun County, Alabama
- Calhoun County, Arkansas
- Calhoun County, Florida
- Calhoun County, Georgia
- Calhoun County, Illinois
- Calhoun County, Iowa
- Calhoun County, Kansas, renamed Jackson County in 1859
- Calhoun County, Michigan
- Calhoun County, Mississippi
- Calhoun County, South Carolina
- Calhoun County, Texas
- Calhoun County, West Virginia

== Streets and highways ==
- Calhoun Avenue, Atlanta, Georgia
- Calhoun Avenue, Calhoun, Georgia
- Calhoun Avenue, Chattanooga, Tennessee
- Calhoun Avenue, Destin, Florida
- Calhoun Avenue, Fayetteville, Tennessee
- Calhoun Avenue, Florahome, Florida
- Calhoun Avenue, Goose Creek, South Carolina
- Calhoun Avenue, Lake City, Florida
- Calhoun Avenue, Maitland, Florida
- Calhoun Avenue, Nashville, Tennessee
- Calhoun Avenue, Panama City, Florida
- Calhoun Avenue, Pensacola, Florida
- Calhoun Avenue, Woodbine, New Jersey
- Calhoun Avenue, Yazoo City, Mississippi
- Calhoun Creek Road, Liberty, Kentucky
- Calhoun Highway, Arnoldsburg, West Virginia
- Calhoun Highway, Big Bend, West Virginia
- Calhoun Highway, Big Springs, West Virginia
- Calhoun Highway, Chloe, West Virginia
- Calhoun Highway, Grantsville, West Virginia
- Calhoun Highway, Millstone, West Virginia
- Calhoun Highway, Mount Zion, West Virginia
- Calhoun Highway, Orma, West Virginia
- Calhoun Highway, Smithville, West Virginia
- Calhoun Hill Road, Abbeville, South Carolina
- Calhoun Lane, Burnside, Kentucky
- Calhoun Lane, Dobson, North Carolina
- Calhoun Lane, Goode, Virginia
- Calhoun Lane, Northport, Alabama
- Calhoun Lane, Pinehurst, North Carolina
- Calhoun Lane, Pitts, Georgia
- Calhoun Lane, Port Charlotte, Florida
- Calhoun Lane, Prestonburg, Kentucky
- Calhoun Lane, Sugar Grove, Virginia
- Calhoun Lane, Wadley, Georgia
- Calhoun Parkway, renamed Bde Maka Ska Parkway in 2019, Minneapolis, Minnesota
- Calhoun Place, Chicago, Illinois
- Calhoun Place, Noblesville, Indiana
- Calhoun Place, Sumter, South Carolina
- Calhoun Place, Tonawanda, New York
- Calhoun Road, Addison, Michigan
- Calhoun Road, Brookfield, Wisconsin
- Calhoun Road, Elizabeth, Pennsylvania
- Calhoun Road, Greenwood, South Carolina
- Calhoun Road, Houston, Texas
- Calhoun Road, Jerome, Michigan
- Calhoun Road, McKeesport, Pennsylvania
- Calhoun Road, Milan, Michigan
- Calhoun Road, Newland, North Carolina
- Calhoun Road, Rocky Mount, North Carolina
- Calhoun Road, Ostrander, Ohio
- Calhoun Road, Thurman, Ohio
- Calhoun Road, West Jefferson, North Carolina
- Calhoun Street, Johnston, South Carolina
- Calhoun Street, Alameda, California
- Calhoun Street, Anderson, South Carolina
- Calhoun Street, Baltimore, Maryland
- Calhoun Street, Bluffton, South Carolina
- Calhoun Street, Charleston, South Carolina
- Calhoun Street, Clemson, South Carolina
- Calhoun Street, Columbia, South Carolina
- Calhoun Street, Fort Wayne, Indiana
- Calhoun Street, LaBelle, Florida
- Calhoun Street, Gary, Indiana
- Calhoun Street, Greenville, South Carolina
- Calhoun Street, Lehigh Acres, Florida
- Calhoun Street, New Orleans, Louisiana
- Calhoun Street, Norway, South Carolina
- Calhoun Street, Plant City, Florida
- Calhoun Street, Portland, Oregon
- Calhoun Street, Port Townsend, Washington
- Calhoun Street, Tallahassee, Florida
- Calhoun Street, Temple, Texas
- Calhoun Street, West Liberty, Iowa
- Calhoun Street, Brimfield, Illinois
- Calhoun Street Extension, Trenton, New Jersey
- Calhoun Street Lane, Macon, Georgia
- John C. Calhoun Drive, Orangeburg, South Carolina
- John C. Calhoun Expressway, Augusta, Georgia

== Lakes, parks, and squares ==
- Calhoun Landing, Santee-Cooper River, Santee, South Carolina
- John C. Calhoun Monument, Charleston, South Carolina
- Calhoun Square, Savannah, Georgia
- Lake Calhoun, Knox County, Illinois
- Lake Calhoun, renamed Bde Maka Ska in 2018, Minneapolis, Minnesota
- Calhoun Park, Lake Berlin, Wisconsin
- John C. Calhoun Park in North Augusta, South Carolina where the Meriwether Monument stands

== Schools and colleges ==
- Calhoun Academy, St. Matthews, South Carolina
- Calhoun Academy, Calhoun City, Mississippi
- Calhoun Community College (formerly, John C. Calhoun State Community College), Huntsville, Alabama
- Calhoun Elementary School, Calhoun, Georgia
- Calhoun High School, Calhoun, Georgia
- Calhoun High School, Port Lavaca, Texas
- Calhoun Middle School, Calhoun, Georgia
- Calhoun Primary School, Calhoun, Georgia
- Calhoun County High School, St. Matthews, South Carolina
- Calhoun County Middle-High School, Edison, Georgia
- Calhoun County Middle-High School, Mount Zion, West Virginia
- John C. Calhoun Academy, Walterboro, South Carolina (later renamed Colleton Preparatory Academy in 1990)
- John C. Calhoun Elementary School, Calhoun Falls, South Carolina
- Orangeburg-Calhoun Technical College, Orangeburg, South Carolina
- Calhoun Academy of the Arts (formerly Calhoun Street Elementary School), Anderson, SC

=== Renamed schools and colleges ===
- Calhoun College (Yale University), Connecticut was renamed Grace Hopper College in 2017.
- Calhoun Honors College, Clemson University in Clemson, South Carolina, was renamed Clemson University Honors College in 2020.
