= Cook Run (stream) =

Cook Run Tributary to West Fork Little Kanawha River
- Location of Cook Run in Calhoun County, West Virginia.
- Nickname: Cooks Fork

Location
- Country: United States
- State: West Virginia
- County: Calhoun

Physical characteristics
- Mouth
  - location: about 3 miles southwest of Arnoldsburg, West Virginia
  - coordinates: 38°44′58″N 81°09′40″W
  - elevation: 747.51 ft (227.84 m)

Basin features
- River system: Little Kanawha River
- Tributaries
  - right: Beech Fork

Cook Run, also locally known as Cooks Fork, is a stream in Calhoun County, West Virginia, and a tributary of the West Fork Little Kanawha River. It originates south of the unincorporated community of Arnoldsburg, and nearby to Beech.

== Etymology ==
The stream derives its name from the Reverend Barnabas Cook, a pioneer clergyman from New England who settled in the area during the early 19th century. Cook is credited as one of the earliest ministers to evangelize the West Fork and organized its first church in 1822. Cook was one of the earliest to settle in the area, having married into the local O'Brien and McCune families. Nearby Saul Run, also known as Sauls Fork, is named after one of Cook's sons, Saul Cook.

== Folklore ==
Local paranormal folklore holds that the area around Cook Run, including nearby tributaries of the West Fork Little Kanawha River, are visited by the benevolent spirit of Alva Laughlin, a Union soldier who was captured and killed by Confederates during the Skirmish of Arnoldsburg in May 1863. According to legend dating back to the early 1940s, Laughlin can sometimes be heard singing in the areas of McCunes Run, Sauls Fork, Road Run, Beech Fork, and down Cooks Fork, or Cook Run, where he reportedly stops to pray at the nearby Fairview Church. The tradition is attributed to recollections that Laughlin was fond of singing hymns during his lifetime.

== See also ==
- West Fork Little Kanawha River
- List of rivers of West Virginia
