= U.S. Route 33 in West Virginia =

Segment of American highway

U.S. Route 33
- US 33 highlighted in red

Route information
- Maintained by WVDOH
- Length: 248 mi (399 km)
- Existed: 1926–present

Major junctions
- West end: US 33 at the Ohio state line in Ravenswood
- I-77 from Ravenswood to Ripley; US 119 from Spencer to Buckhannon; I-79 in Weston; US 48 from Weston to Elkins; US 219 in Elkins; US 220 in Franklin
- East end: US 33 at the Virginia state line near Brandywine

Location
- Country: United States
- State: West Virginia
- Counties: Jackson, Roane, Calhoun, Gilmer, Lewis, Upshur, Barbour, Randolph, Pendleton

Highway system
- United States Numbered Highway System; List; Special; Divided; West Virginia State Highway System; Interstate; US; State
| ← WV 32 | → WV 34 |

U.S. Route 33 (US 33) in the U.S. state of West Virginia extends 248 miles (399 km) from the Ohio River at Ravenswood to the Virginia state line atop Shenandoah Mountain west of Harrisonburg, Virginia.

== Route description ==
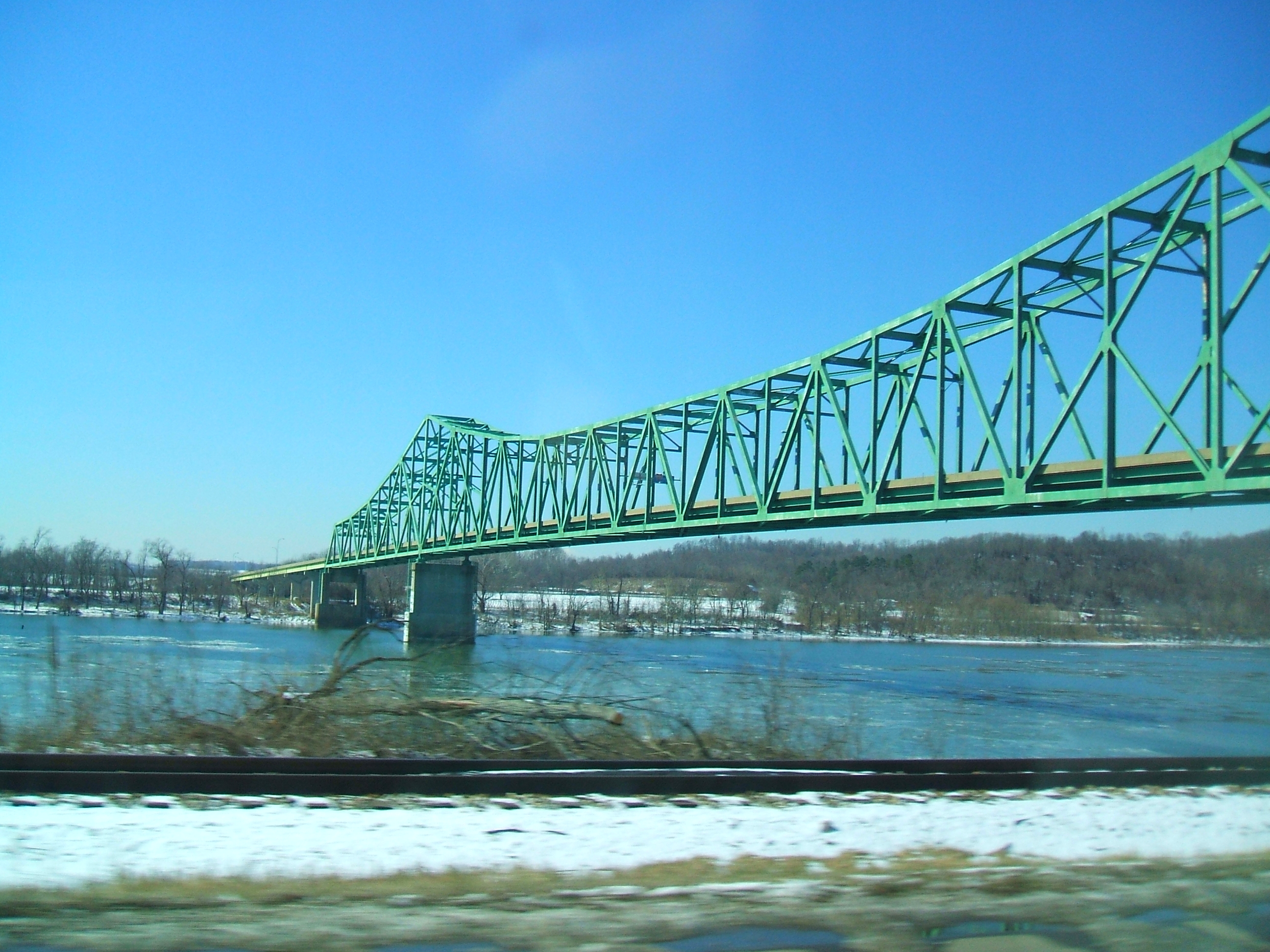
US 33 crossing the Ohio River on the Ravenswood Bridge, viewed from Ravenswood, with the Ohio bank of the river in the distance

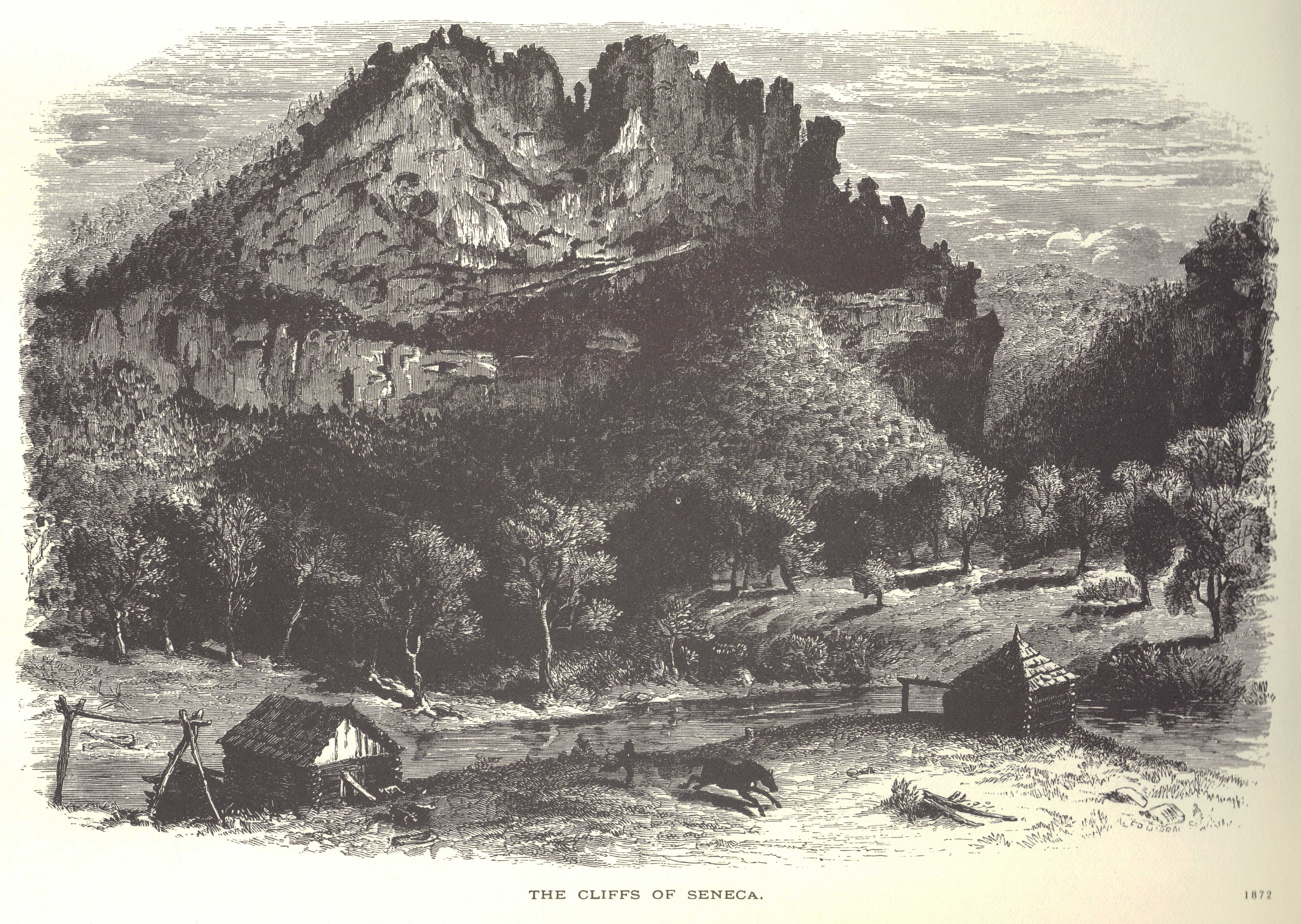
Seneca Rocks, along US 33 in Pendleton County, West Virginia (Wood engraving "The Cliffs of Seneca" by David H.Strother, published in 1872)

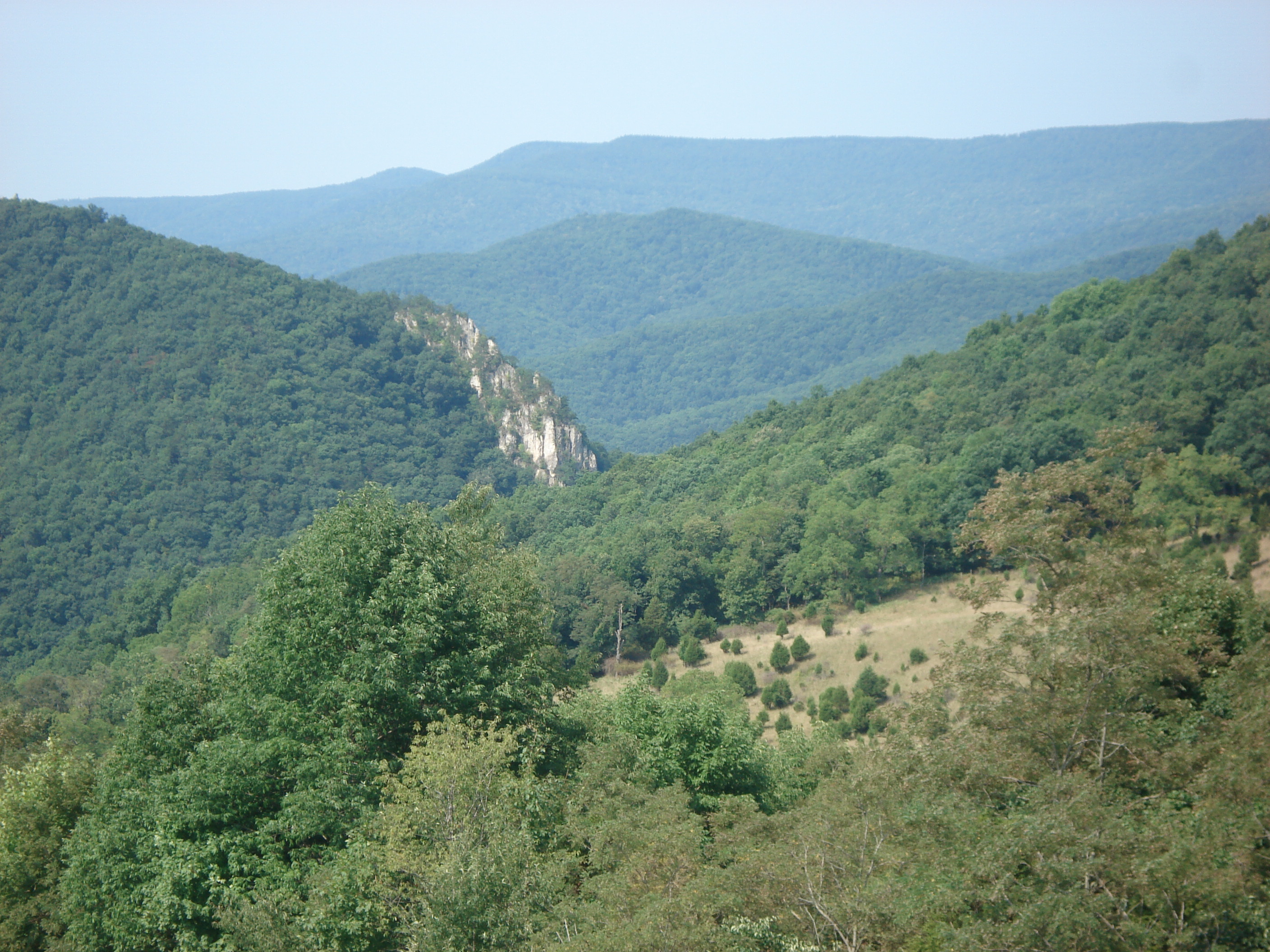
US 33 passes through Judy Gap (center), after descending the Allegheny Front (background; highest point is Spruce Knob)

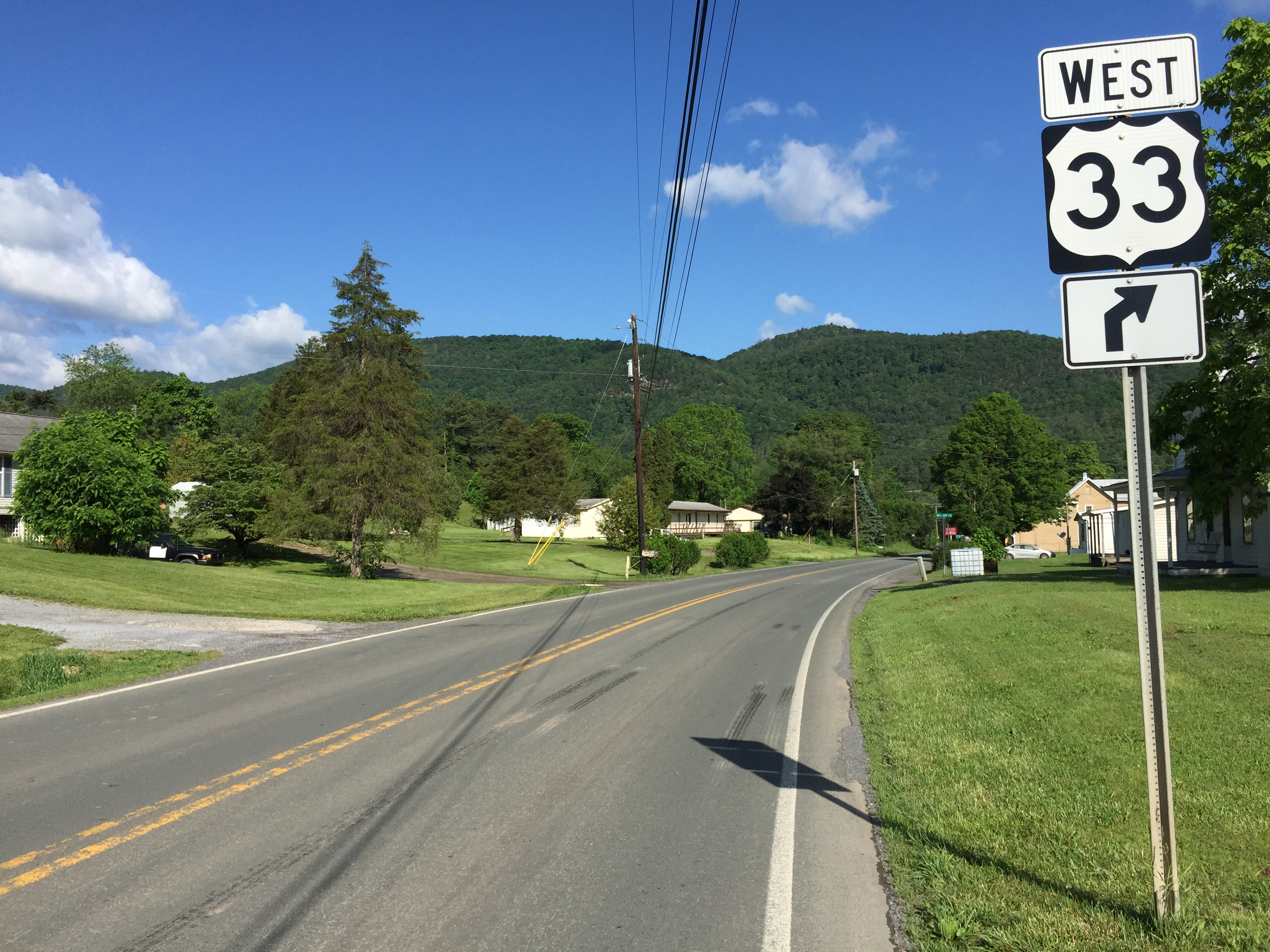
View west along US 33 in Pendleton County

Shortly after leaving Ohio, crossing the Ohio River on the Ravenswood Bridge and entering Ravenswood, West Virginia, US 33 curves north, then west, meeting and turning south on West Virginia Route 68 (WV 68). Traveling about 4/10 mile (0.64 km) to the WV 2 divided highway, WV 68 ends, the roadway continues as Hemlock Road, while US 33 turns onto northbound WV 2. The two routes travel northeast, then southeast about 2.3 miles (3.7 km) to Silverton. There, they meet Interstate 77 and split, with WV 2 turning onto northbound I-77, the roadway continuing as County Road 56 (Green Hills Road), and US 33 joining southbound I-77 to Ripley. The route then turns east from I-77, joining US 119 at Spencer, then passing through extremely rural areas of Roane, Calhoun, Gilmer, and Lewis counties.

US 33 intersects Interstate 79 at Weston, West Virginia. From Interstate 79 east, US 33 is a four-lane highway, part of Corridor H of the Appalachian Development Highway System. The four-lane segment continues on through rural areas of Upshur, and Randolph counties, to just a couple miles past Elkins.

At Harding, US 250 joins US 33 for several miles after Elkins, where US 33 joins SR 55 and returns to a two-lane road, except for a seven-mile (11 km) section of four-lane across Kelly Mountain between Canfield and Bowden. Passing through the Monongahela National Forest, US 33 crosses the Eastern Continental Divide between Harman and Onego at about 3,240 feet (990 m) elevation, entering Pendleton County, then descends the Allegheny Front along Seneca Creek, skirting the north end of Spruce Mountain, at 4,861 feet (1,482 m) the highest point of the Allegheny Mountains.

US 33 then joins SR 28 at Seneca Rocks, West Virginia, and continues south in the Potomac River headwaters through scenic forest and farmland landscapes. Turning eastward from SR 28 at Judy Gap, US 33 crosses North Fork Mountain at about 3,600 feet (1,100 m), with a turnout on the western slope offering a scenic view of the Germany Valley below and the more distant Allegheny Front from Spruce Knob to Dolly Sods. US 220 joins US 33 for about half a mile in Franklin. After Franklin, US 33 continues eastward through rural areas, then climbs steeply to cross Shenandoah Mountain at Dry River Gap at about 3,450 feet (1,050 m) into Rockingham County, Virginia.

== Major intersections ==
| County | Location | mi | km | Destinations | Notes |
|---|---|---|---|---|---|
| Ohio River | | 0.0 | 0.0 | US 33 west – Columbus | Continuation into Ohio |
| Ohio River | | 0.0 | 0.0 | Ravenswood Bridge; Ohio–West Virginia state line | |
| Jackson | Ravenswood | | | WV 68 north – Ravenswood | Western end of WV 68 overlap |
| Jackson | Ravenswood | | | WV 2 south – Point Pleasant | Western end of WV 2 overlap |
| Jackson | Silverton | 3.35 | 5.39 | I-77 north / WV 2 north – Parkersburg | Eastern end of WV 2 overlap; northern end of I-77 overlap |
| Jackson | Ripley | 11.39 | 18.33 | I-77 south / WV 62 south – Charleston | Southern end of I-77 overlap |
| Roane | Spencer | | | WV 14 – Elizabeth | |
| Roane | Spencer | | | US 119 south – Clendenin | Western end of US 119 overlap |
| Calhoun | Arnoldsburg | | | WV 16 south to I-79 – Orma | Western end of WV 16 overlap |
| Calhoun | Millstone | | | WV 16 north – Grantsville | Eastern end of WV 16 overlap |
| Gilmer | Glenville | | | WV 5 west – Grantsville | Western end of WV 5 overlap |
| Gilmer | Glenville | | | WV 5 east – Burnsville | Eastern end of WV 5 overlap |
| Gilmer | Linn | | | WV 47 west – Burnt House | |
| Lewis | Weston | | | US 19 south (Main Avenue) | Western end of US 19 overlap (southbound lanes) |
| Lewis | Weston | | | US 19 north (Central Avenue) | Western end of US 19 overlap (northbound lanes) |
| Lewis | Weston | | | US 19 (E. 3rd Street) | Eastern end of US 19 overlap (all lanes) |
| Lewis | Weston | | | US 48 begin / I-79 – Clarksburg, Charleston | Western terminus of US 48; western end of US 48 overlap; I-79 exit 99 |
| Upshur | Buckhannon | | | CR 12 (Main Street) | Interchange; eastbound exit only |
| Upshur | Buckhannon | | | US 119 north / WV 20 – Buckhannon, Philippi | Eastern end of US 119 overlap |
| Barbour | No major junctions | | | | |
| Randolph | | | | US 250 north / WV 92 north – Philippi | Western end of US 250/WV 92 overlaps |
| Randolph | Aggregates | | | WV 92 south (Harrison Avenue) – Crystal Springs | Eastern end of WV 92 overlap; former US 33 alignment |
| Randolph | Elkins | | | US 48 east / US 219 north – Parsons | Western end of US 48/US 219 overlap |
| Randolph | Elkins | | | WV 92 north (Harrison Avenue) | Western end of WV 92 overlap; former US 33 alignment |
| Randolph | Elkins | | | US 219 south / US 250 south / WV 55 west / WV 92 south – Huttonsville | Eastern end of US 219/US 250/WV 92 overlaps; western end of WV 55 overlap |
| Randolph | Harman | | | WV 32 north – Davis | |
| Pendleton | Seneca Rocks | | | WV 28 north / WV 55 east – Petersburg | Eastern end of WV 55 overlap; northern end of WV 28 overlap |
| Pendleton | Judy Gap | | | WV 28 south – Circleville, Green Bank | Southern end of WV 28 overlap |
| Pendleton | Franklin | | | US 220 north – Petersburg | Northern end of US 220 overlap |
| Pendleton | Franklin | | | US 220 south – Monterey | Southern end of US 220 overlap |
| Shenandoah Mountain | | | | West Virginia–Virginia state line; elevation 3,450 ft (1,050 m) | |
| Shenandoah Mountain | | | | US 33 east – Harrisonburg | Continuation into Virginia |
1.000 mi = 1.609 km; 1.000 km = 0.621 mi: Concurrency terminus; Incomplete access
