= Orma =

Orma may refer to:

== Places ==
- Orma, Pella, Greece
- Orma, Tibet
- Orma, West Virginia, US

== People with the name ==
- Orma Rinehart Smith (1904–1982), United States district judge
- Orma W. Wallengren (fl. 1960s), American writer

== Other uses ==
- Orma (clan), one of the greater Oromo clans in the Horn of Africa
  - Orma language
- Orma, a 2005 TV serial directed by K. K. Rajeev
- Ocean Racing Multihull Association
  - ORMA 60, a class of sailing trimarans
- Orma, common name of the butterfly Mopala orma
- 2517 Orma, a minor planet

== See also ==
- Orma Marble Palace, in Kothakulangara, in Kerala, India
