= Cooks Run =

Cooks Run may refer to:

- Cook Run (stream), a stream in Calhoun County, West Virginia
- Cooks Run (Rattail Branch), a stream in Ohio
- Cooks Run (Neshaminy Creek tributary), a stream in Pennsylvania
- Cooks Run, Pennsylvania, an unincorporated community in Clinton County, Pennsylvania
