= Cremo =

Cremo may refer to:

- Cremo, West Virginia, an unincorporated community in Calhoun County
- Cremo (company), Swiss dairy manufacturer
- Michael Cremo (1948–2026), an American freelance researcher
