= Calhoun County School District =

Calhoun County School District may refer to:

- Calhoun County Schools (Alabama)
- Calhoun County School District (Florida)
- Calhoun County School District (Georgia)
- Calhoun County School District (Mississippi)
- Calhoun County Schools (West Virginia)
