= Dodrill =

Dodrill may refer to:

- Dodrill, West Virginia
- Dale Dodrill (1926–2019), American footballer
- Forest Dewey Dodrill (1902–1997), doctor and mechanical heart co-developer
  - Dodrill–GMR, the first operational mechanical heart for open heart surgery
- Dean Dodrill, video game designer
