= Five Forks, Calhoun County, West Virginia =

Unincorporated community in West Virginia, United States

Five Forks, West Virginia
- Unincorporated community
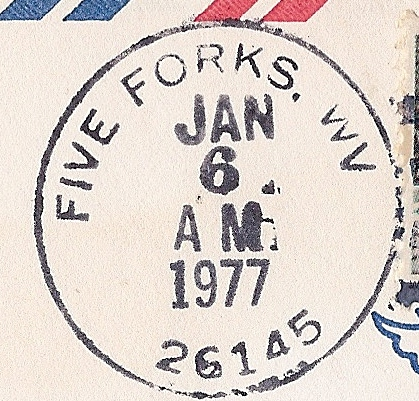
- Five Forks West Virginia postmark with the retired 26145 ZIP Code

- Location within the state of West Virginia Five Forks (the United States)
- Coordinates: 38°58′9″N 81°3′38″W
- Country: United States
- State: West Virginia
- County: Calhoun
- Time zone: UTC-5 (Eastern (EST))
  - Summer (DST): UTC-4 (EDT)
- GNIS feature ID: 1554463

Five Forks is an unincorporated community in Calhoun County, West Virginia, United States. It lies along West Virginia Route 16 to the north of the town of Grantsville, the county seat of Calhoun County. Its elevation is 1,106 feet (337 m). The Five Forks Post Office is closed.
