= Project Appleseed =

Marksmanship program

Revolutionary War Veterans Association (RWVA)
- Headquarters: Ramseur, North Carolina
- Founder: Jack Dailey ("Fred")
- Website: http://appleseedinfo.org

Project Appleseed is a program that focuses on teaching traditional rifle marksmanship from standing, sitting/kneeling and prone positions over a two-day weekend shooting clinic called an "Appleseed". It is the primary focus of The Revolutionary War Veterans Association (RWVA), a 501(c)(3) non-profit organization that teaches and promotes traditional rifle marksmanship, while also teaching American heritage and history in order to encourage civic activism. Project Appleseed is apolitical, a legal requirement of 501(c)(3) organizations, and instructors are barred from discussing modern politics.

The Revolutionary War Veterans Association and Project Appleseed are a Civilian Marksmanship Program affiliated organization, enabling Appleseed participants to buy rifles and ammunition through the CMP.

== History ==
Project Appleseed started from a series of ads appearing in Shotgun News, a monthly gun trade newspaper publication. These ads were written under a pseudonym "Fred". "Fred", the founder of Project Appleseed, whose real name is Jack Dailey, wrote a long running column—actually a portion of ad space for Fred's M14 Stocks—starting in 1999. A common theme in these columns was "Are you a cook or a rifleman?", a "cook" being Fred's term for an unqualified shooter. The name of the project was in deference to Johnny Appleseed, an American pioneer nurseryman and grass roots missionary who traveled the American frontier planting apple trees across the land with the goal of spreading the number of apple trees in America.

Fred's goal was to accomplish the same with civic-minded Riflemen in America. Project Appleseed itself began in April 2005 in Ramseur, North Carolina. These long-running ads ceased in 2017, upon Jack Dailey retiring and selling his business. After Mr. Dailey retired from active leadership in the program in 2015, a board of directors, termed the "Appleseed Oversight Committee" (AOC), assumed responsibility for the program. The current Chairman of the AOC is Tom Kehoe of Palm Bay, FL. In 2025, the AOC was renamed The Appleseed Board of Directors. The day-to-day operations of the program are managed by a National Coordinator, currently Jeff Yeager of Cleveland, TN.

In 2006, Appleseed instructors began a national tour to attract instructors who could maintain and develop local programs. As of 2024, more than 250,000 individuals from all 50 states had attended an Appleseed. An independent sister program called Mapleseed has been developed in Canada. As of 2024, over 900 volunteers serve at Appleseed clinics across the country. These volunteers are both marksmanship instructors and storytellers, sharing history of the opening day of the American Revolutionary War. Project Appleseed celebrated its 20th Anniversary in 2025, having served more than 150,000 shooters in its programs.

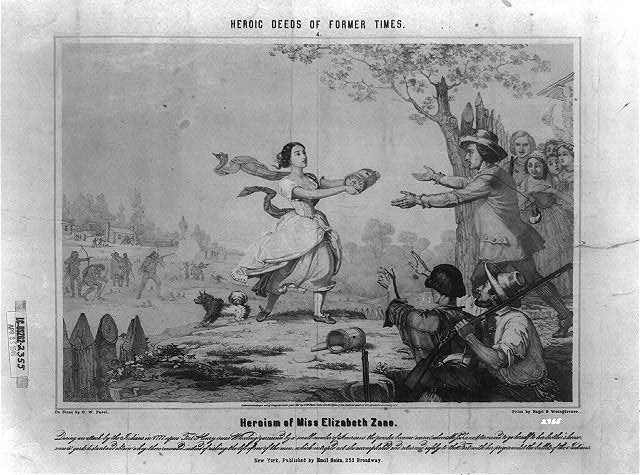
A 19th century depiction of young Elizabeth Zane's legendary feat of retrieving powder during the Revolutionary War

== Instruction ==
Although the program initially focused on the use of the M14/M1A and M-1 Garand rifles, students at marksmanship clinics today mostly use semiauto rimfire rifles chambered for the inexpensive .22 Long Rifle cartridge. Targets are placed at 25 meters, and appropriately scaled to simulate shooting at distances out to 400 yards. The use of .22 caliber rifles increased the reach of the program by reducing the total cost to attend, and drawing in less-experienced shooters. Students may bring rifles in calibers up to 8mm, if a firing a rifle cartridge, or .45 caliber or less, if shooting a pistol-caliber cartridge.

Project Appleseed also offers longer-distance classes such as Rimfire Known Distance clinics (out to 200 yards) and centerfire Known Distance clinics (out to 400 yards) in select locations across the country. In 2019, the program rolled out the Appleseed Pistol Clinic, which focuses on the fundamentals of pistol marksmanship to prepare students to take a defensive pistol class.

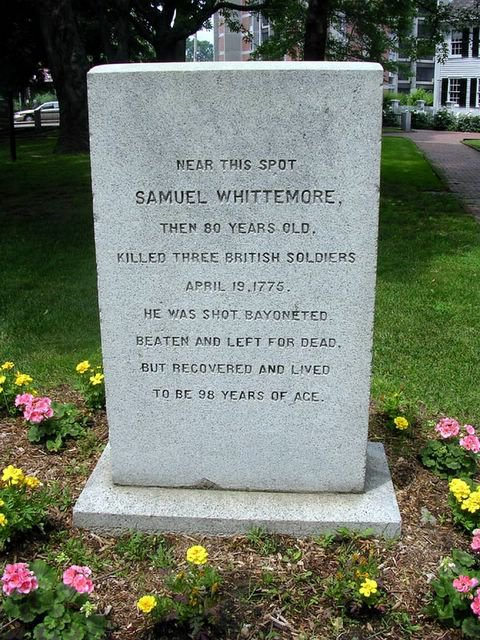
Monument to Samuel Whittemore, the oldest known colonial combatant in the Revolutionary War

The American history presented at Project Appleseed clinics include the events leading up to the American Revolution, specifically the Battles of Lexington and Concord, and the subsequent British retreat to Boston. The story is presented in three sections, referred to as the "Three Strikes of the Match". The Three Strikes are the three key events along Battle Road on April 19, 1775, that triggered the Revolutionary War.

The volunteers of Project Appleseed also participate in history-only presentations (no shooting involved) called "Libertyseeds". These events usually feature content on the "Three Strikes" that were needed to start the American Revolutionary War.

The history presented offers special emphasis on the heroism and sacrifices of individuals such as Paul Revere, Dr. Samuel Prescott, and William Dawes; Captains John Parker (Lexington), Isaac Davis (Acton), and Hezekiah Wyman; William Heath; Elizabeth Zane; and octogenarian Samuel Whittemore, the oldest known colonial combatant in the American Revolutionary War.

Stories of Daniel Morgan and his Morgan's Riflemen also are told. Known Distance Appleseeds often add stories featuring Patrick Ferguson and Timothy Murphy, who were riflemen that played major roles at the Battle of Brandywine, Second Battle of Saratoga, and the Battle of Kings Mountain.

== Cadre of Instructors ==
All Appleseed instructors are unpaid volunteers. Prospective instructors must first qualify to Expert Rifleman standards before starting a rigorous professional development process requiring mastery of the instructional material. This process takes a minimum of 80 hours of hands-on training plus some self-directed study. Instructors in Training wear orange hats while as they progress to the role of full Instructor.

Full instructors wear red hats. Marksmanship clinic leaders (known as Shoot Bosses) don green hats when they are serving in that role. A small percentage of instructors rise to the role of Senior and Master Instructor. Entrusted with maintaining teaching standards and quality control, Senior and Master Instructors optionally wear grey hats.

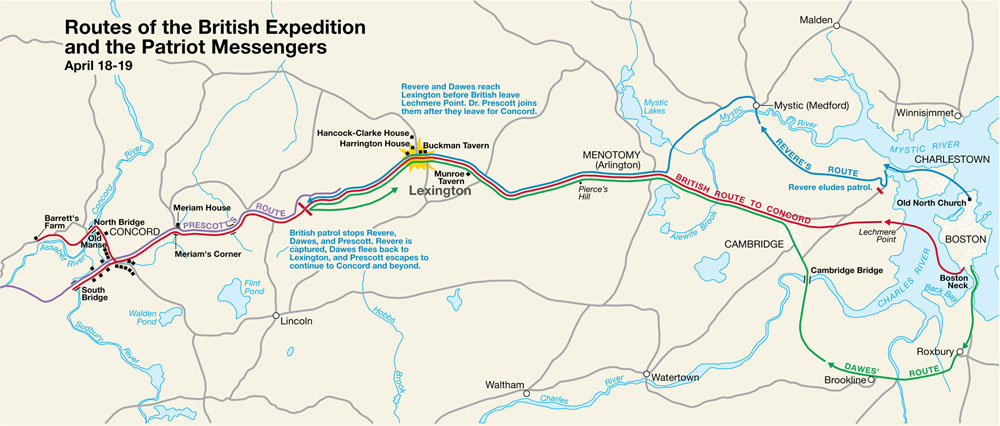
A National Park Service map showing the routes of the initial Patriot messengers and of the British expedition

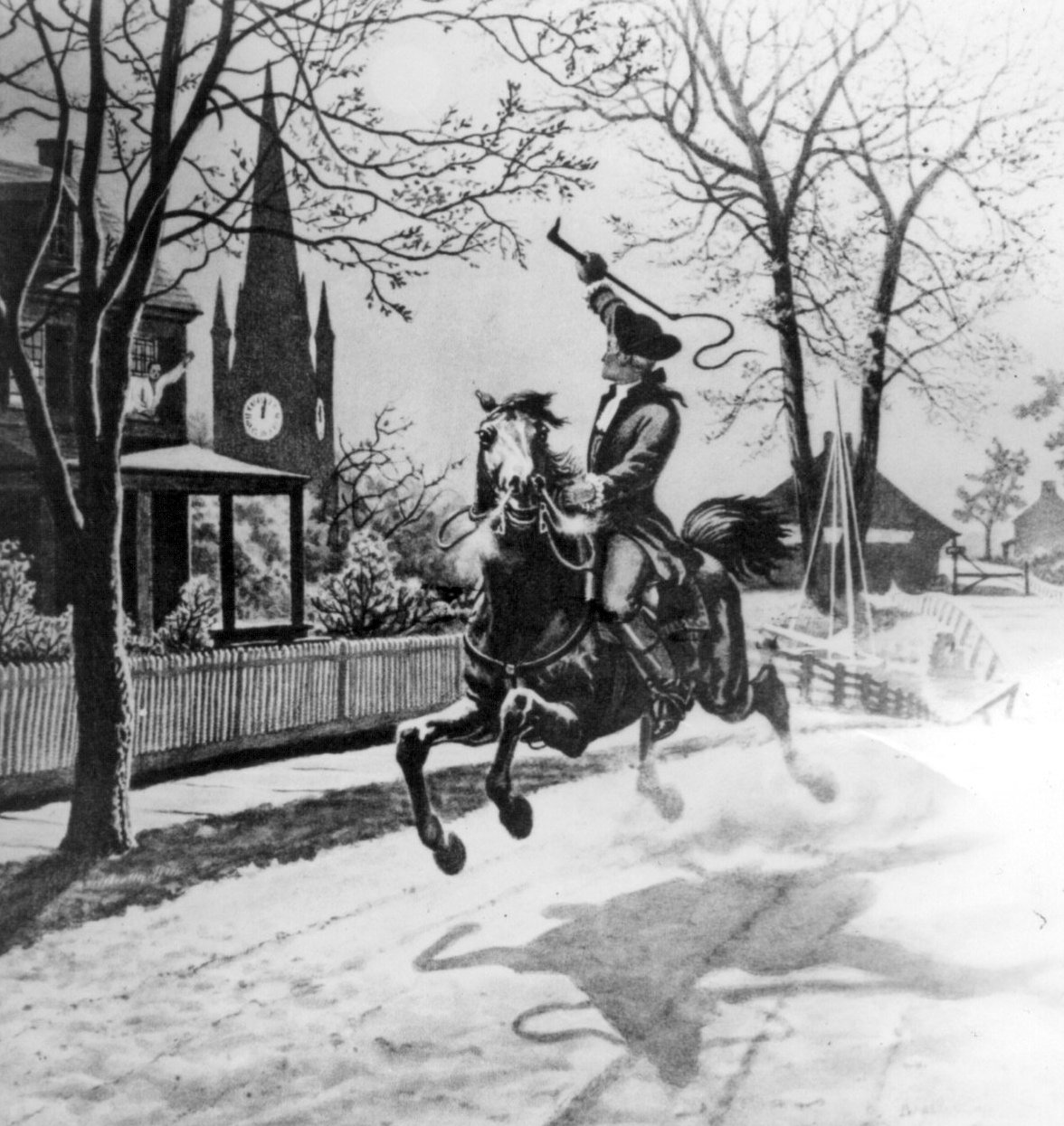
Depiction of Paul Revere's ride on Brown Beauty

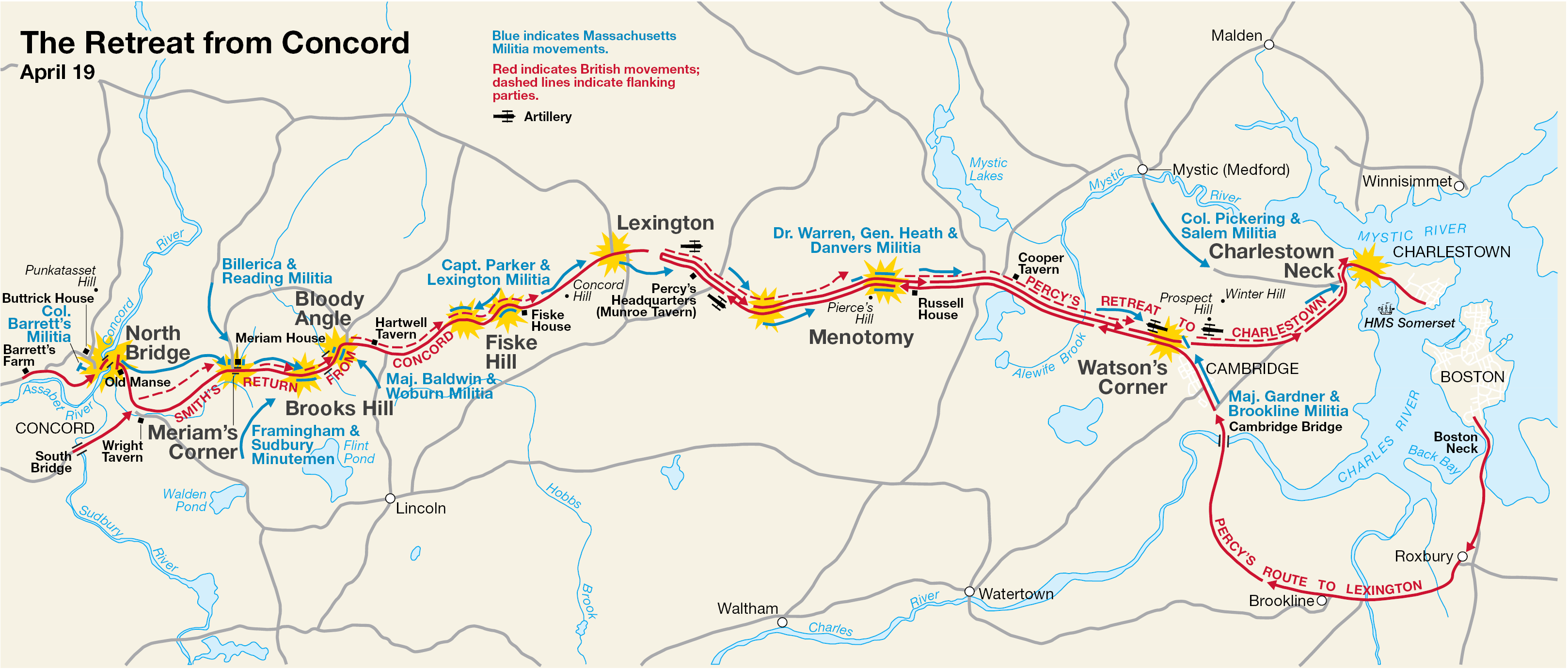
A National Park Service map showing the retreat from Concord and Percy's rescue

== See also ==
- Civilian Marksmanship Program
- Designated marksman
- High power rifle
- Marksmanship Badge (United States)
- Shooting sport
- Stinson, West Virginia
- Wimbledon Cup
