= Stinson, West Virginia =

- Unincorporated community
- Location within the state of West Virginia Stinson (the United States)
- Coordinates: 38°39′23″N 81°4′28″W
- Country: United States
- State: West Virginia
- County: Calhoun
- Time zone: UTC-5 (Eastern (EST))
  - Summer (DST): UTC-4 (EDT)

Stinson is an unincorporated community in Calhoun County, West Virginia, United States. It lies along West Virginia Route 16 and the West Fork Little Kanawha River, to the south of the town of Grantsville, the county seat of Calhoun County. Its elevation is 823 feet (251 m). At some point, Stinson possessed a post office, which has since been closed.

The Stinson-Mud Fork area was known as a wild and wooly area in the early 1900s and was the subject of a song by Appalachian fiddler Blind Ed Haley, "Don't Go Up Stinson After Dark."

In 2009, Stinson became the location of West Virginia's first Dedicated Appleseed Range (DAR). A DAR is a location where year round Revolutionary War Veterans Association (RWVA) events are held to instruct citizens in rifle marksmanship and American Heritage. This venue brings an influx of people from other parts of WV and surrounding states, which injects some welcome revenue and gives exposure to this under served area.
