= Annamoriah, West Virginia =

Unincorporated community in West Virginia, United States

- Unincorporated community
- Location within the state of West Virginia Annamoriah (the United States)
- Coordinates: 38°56′26″N 81°13′37″W
- Country: United States
- State: West Virginia
- County: Calhoun
- Time zone: UTC-5 (Eastern (EST))
  - Summer (DST): UTC-4 (EDT)
- ZIP codes: 26130

Annamoriah is an unincorporated community in Calhoun County, West Virginia, United States. It lies along West Virginia Route 5 to the west of the town of Grantsville, the county seat of Calhoun County. Its elevation is 994 feet (303 m). Their post office closed in 1988.
