= Leatherbark =

Leatherbark may refer to:

- Leatherbark, West Virginia, an unincorporated community
- Leatherbark Run, a stream in West Virginia
