= Sycamore, West Virginia =

Sycamore, West Virginia may refer to:

- Sycamore, Calhoun County, West Virginia, an unincorporated community
- Sycamore, Logan County, West Virginia, an unincorporated community
