= Nobe =

Nobe may refer to:

== People ==
- Toshio Nobe (born 1957), Japanese manga artist
- Yuta Nobe (born 1998), Japanese football player

== Places ==
- Nobe, West Virginia, United States

== Other ==
- National Organization for Business and Engineering
- Nobe GT100, a concept car
