= Henry Fork (West Virginia) =

- Location of the mouth of the Henry Fork in West Virginia

Location
- Country: United States
- State: West Virginia
- Counties: Roane, Calhoun

Physical characteristics
- Source
  - location: southeast of Tariff, southeastern Roane County
  - coordinates: 38.6373168°N 81.1676141°W
  - elevation: 1,181 ft (360 m)
- Mouth: West Fork Little Kanawha River
  - location: Boundary of Calhoun and Roane counties at Rocksdale
  - coordinates: 38.8434204°N 81.2206722°W
  - elevation: 673 ft (205 m)
- Length: 21.8 mi (35.1 km)
- Basin size: 91 sq mi (240 km^{2})

Basin features
- Tributaries
  - right: Beech Fork

The Henry Fork is a tributary of the West Fork Little Kanawha River, 21.8 miles (35.1 km) long, in west-central West Virginia in the United States. Via the West Fork and the Little Kanawha and Ohio rivers, it is part of the watershed of the Mississippi River, draining an area of 91 square miles (240 km^{2}) in a rural region on the unglaciated portion of the Allegheny Plateau.

The Henry Fork rises southeast of the community of Tariff in southeastern Roane County and flows generally northward, through Tariff and Linden. From the mouth of its tributary the Beech Fork, it flows along the boundary of Roane and Calhoun counties for the remainder of its course, to its mouth at Rocksdale, where it flows into the West Fork from the south.

== See also ==
- List of rivers of West Virginia
