= Minnora, West Virginia =

- Unincorporated community
- Location within West Virginia Location within the United States
- Coordinates: 38°42′34″N 81°05′53″W
- Country: United States
- State: West Virginia
- County: Calhoun
- Elevation: 784 ft (239 m)
- Time zone: UTC-5 (Eastern (EST))
  - Summer (DST): UTC-4 (EDT)
- Area codes: 304 & 681
- GNIS feature ID: 1555137

Minnora is an unincorporated community in Calhoun County, West Virginia, United States. Minnora is located on West Virginia Route 16 and the West Fork Little Kanawha River, 15 miles (24 km) south of Grantsville.

The community was named after Minnora Knotts, the daughter of a local resident.
