= West Fork Little Kanawha River =

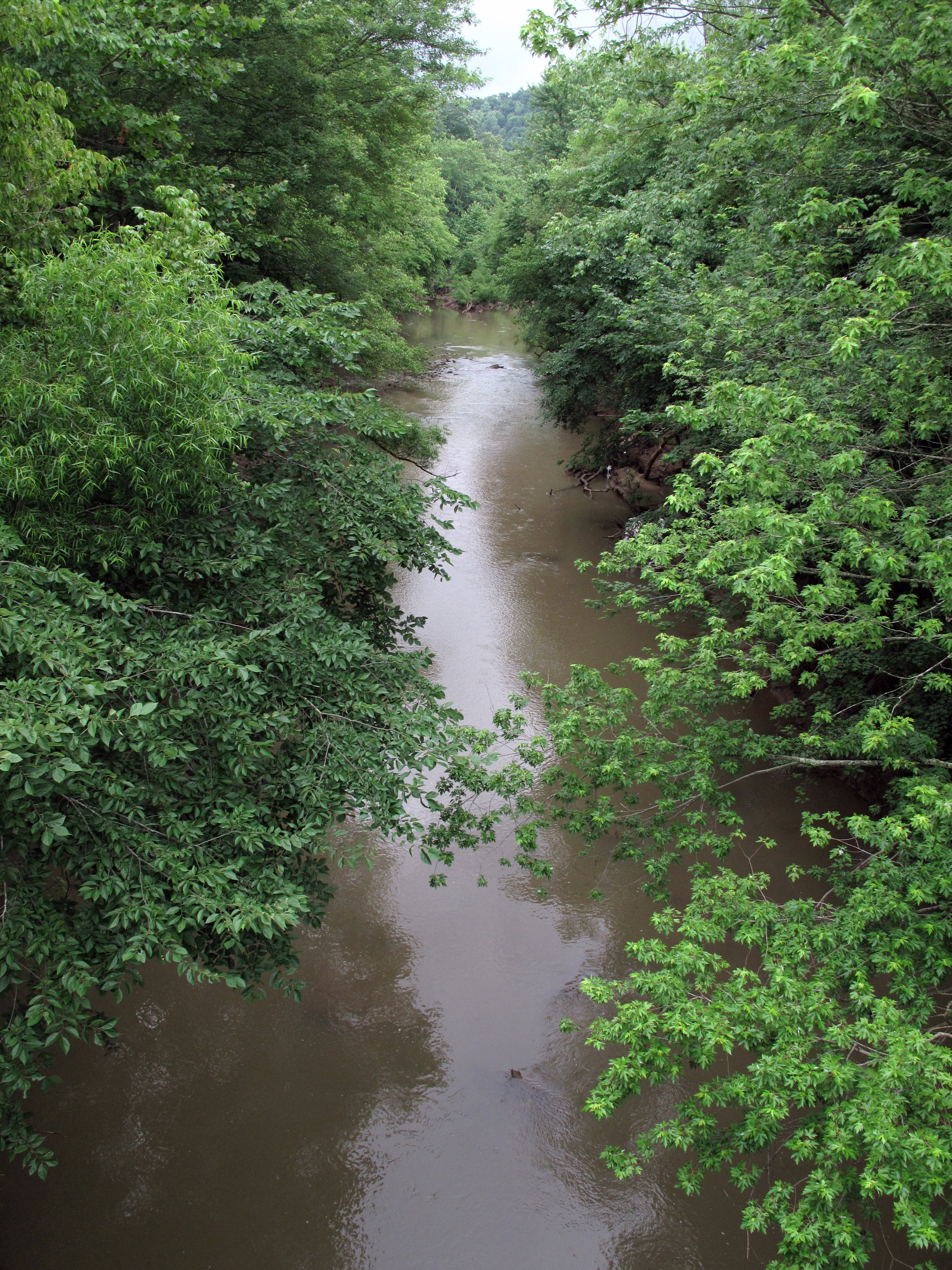
- West Fork Little Kanawha River in Creston in 2009

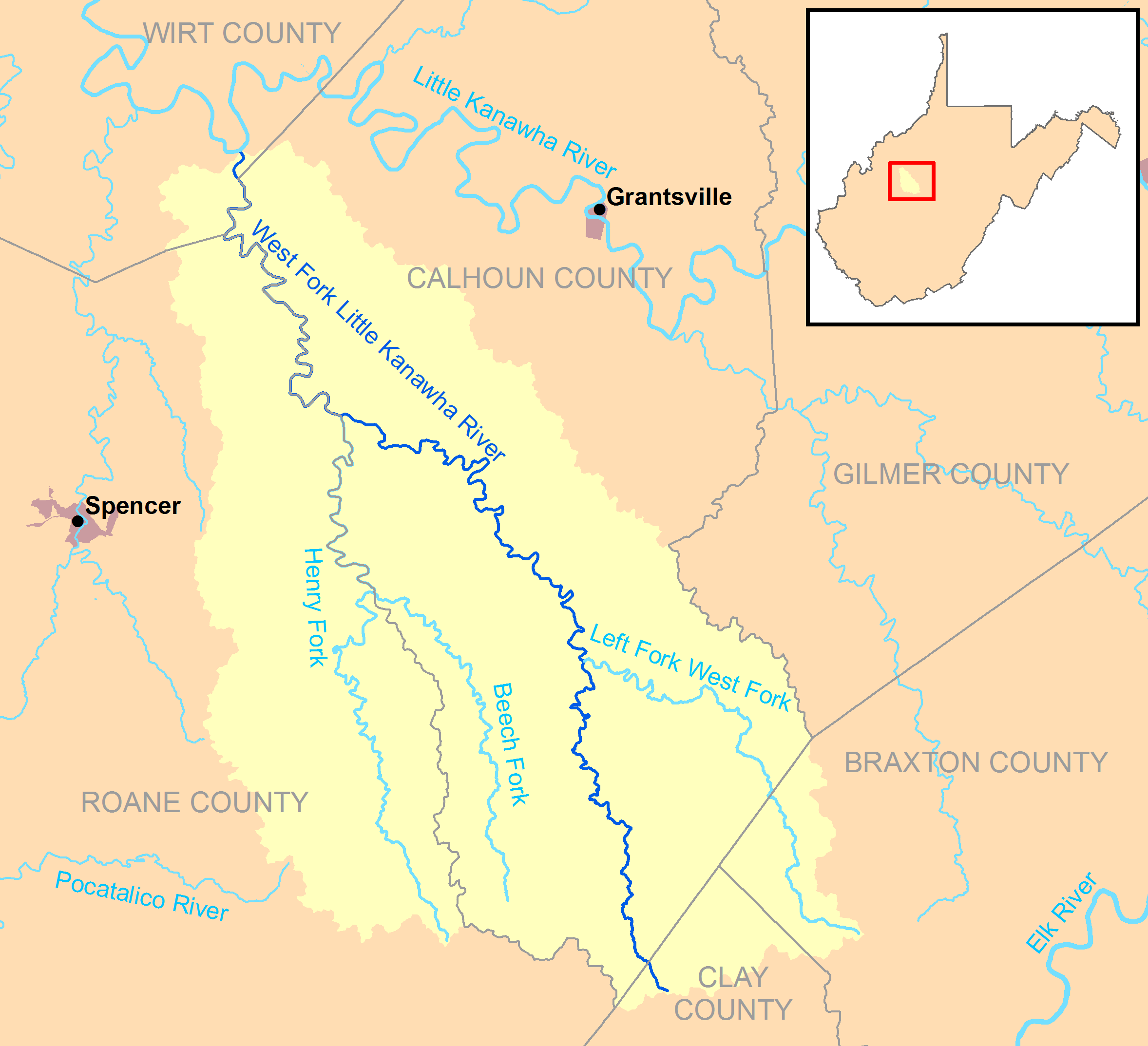
- The West Fork Little Kanawha River and its watershed

Location
- Country: United States
- State: West Virginia
- Counties: Clay, Calhoun, Roane, Wirt

Physical characteristics
- Source
  - location: southwest of Nebo, northern Clay County
  - coordinates: 38.6184296°N 81.0539982°W
  - elevation: 1,178 ft (359 m)
- Mouth: Little Kanawha River
  - location: Creston, Wirt County
  - coordinates: 38.9473052°N 81.2717844°W
  - elevation: 623 ft (190 m)
- Length: 48.1 mi (77.4 km)
- Basin size: 246 sq mi (640 km^{2})
- Discharge
  - location: Rocksdale
  - minimum: 0 cu ft/s (0 m^{3}/s)
  - maximum: 20,200 cu ft/s (570 m^{3}/s)

Basin features
- Tributaries
  - left: Left Fork West Fork Little Kanawha River
  - right: Henry Fork

The West Fork Little Kanawha River is a tributary of the Little Kanawha River, 48.1 miles (77.4 km) long, in west-central West Virginia in the United States. Via the Little Kanawha and Ohio rivers, it is part of the watershed of the Mississippi River, draining an area of 246 square miles (640 km^{2}) in a rural region on the unglaciated portion of the Allegheny Plateau. By drainage area, it is the second-largest tributary of the Little Kanawha River, after the Hughes River.

The West Fork rises southwest of the community of Nebo in northern Clay County and flows generally north-northwestward through Calhoun County and along a portion of Calhoun County's western boundary with Roane and Wirt counties, through the communities of Nebo, Stinson, Chloe, Minnora, Orma, Arnoldsburg, and Rocksdale, to its mouth at Creston in southeastern Wirt County, where it flows into the Little Kanawha River from the south. For most of its course upstream of Arnoldsburg, it is paralleled by West Virginia Route 16; for a short distance downstream of Arnoldsburg, it is paralleled by U.S. Route 33.

Among the West Fork's tributaries are the Left Fork West Fork Little Kanawha River, which it collects at Orma; and the Henry Fork, which it collects along the boundary of Roane and Calhoun counties.

According to the West Virginia Department of Environmental Protection, approximately 91% of the West Fork's watershed is forested, mostly deciduous. Approximately 8.8% is used for pasture and agriculture.

== Flow rate ==
At the United States Geological Survey's stream gauge on the West Fork at Rocksdale, downstream of the mouth of the Henry Fork, the highest recorded flow during the period 1928–2009 was 20,200 ft³/s (572 m³/s) on April 16, 1939. Periods of no flow were recorded at times during several years.

== See also ==
- List of rivers of West Virginia
