= Rocksdale, West Virginia =

- Unincorporated community
- Location within West Virginia Location within the United States
- Coordinates: 38°50′41″N 81°13′05″W
- Country: United States
- State: West Virginia
- County: Calhoun
- Elevation: 676 ft (206 m)
- Time zone: UTC-5 (Eastern (EST))
  - Summer (DST): UTC-4 (EDT)
- Area codes: 304 & 681
- GNIS feature ID: 1555509

Rocksdale is an unincorporated community in Calhoun County, West Virginia, United States. Rocksdale is located along County Route 9 at the confluence of the Henry Fork and the West Fork Little Kanawha River, site of now closed post office established in late 1800s with a country store, 7.5 miles (12.1 km) east-northeast of Spencer.

The community takes its name from a rock formation near the site.
