= Pleasant Hill, Calhoun County, West Virginia =

Pleasant Hill, West Virginia
- Unincorporated community
- Location within West Virginia Location within the United States
- Coordinates: 38°57′13″N 81°03′38″W
- Country: United States
- State: West Virginia
- County: Calhoun
- Elevation: 1,181 ft (360 m)
- Time zone: UTC-5 (Eastern (EST))
  - Summer (DST): UTC-4 (EDT)
- Area codes: 304 & 681
- GNIS feature ID: 1555368

Pleasant Hill is an unincorporated community in Calhoun County, West Virginia, United States. Pleasant Hill is located on West Virginia Route 16, 2.8 miles (4.5 km) northeast of Grantsville.
