= Bernard Bell =

Bernard Bell may refer to:

- Bernard P. Bell (1911–1971), American Medal of Honor recipient
- Bernard Bell (attorney) (fl. 1990s), American attorney and legal scholar
- Bernard Iddings Bell (1886–1958), American Christian author, priest and cultural commentator

== See also ==
- Bernard Belle, American composer, producer, and musician
