= Calhoun County Middle/High School (West Virginia) =

Public school in West Virginia, United States

Coordinates: 38°50′14.7″N 81°6′46.0″W

- 50 Underwood Circle; Mt. Zion, WV 26151

Information
- Type: Public
- Established: 1998
- School district: Calhoun County Schools
- CEEB code: 490505
- NCES School ID: 540021000142
- Principal: Melanie Arthur
- Teaching staff: 39.00 (FTE)
- Grades: 5 – 12
- Enrollment: 516 (2023–2024)
- Student to teacher ratio: 13.23
- Colors: Red, White, and Black
- Mascot: Red Devil
- Website: https://ccmhs.calhoun.k12.wv.us/o/ccmhs

Calhoun County Middle/High School is a coeducational public school serving grades 5–12 in Mount Zion, West Virginia served by Calhoun County Schools.

== History ==
Calhoun County High School was originally instituted in the township of Grantsville, West Virginia. Later on, due to an aging building, a new school building was constructed in Mount Zion, West Virginia. The newly constructed building, in addition to providing updated facilities, changed the structure of the Calhoun Education System.

=== 2012-2014 ===
The Calhoun school system has been plagued with rising debt over the past few years. Despite financial problems, the Calhoun County Board of Education, in 2012, commissioned the building of the Arnoldsburg School. The Arnoldsburg elementary school was completed in 2013, with state of the art furnishings. Nothing from the old building was moved to the new structure. In 2014, the county faced a deficit of over 800,000 dollars. With the rising debt and the loss of students, the board of education proposed a new levy to raise needed funds from Calhoun County residents. In the wake of the financial upheaval many of the county's extracurricular programs were at risk of being discontinued.

=== 2016 ===
With the help of community members and local businesses a new basketball court was completed during the summer of 2016. Calhoun County Middle High School has made changes in education approaches through the adoption of SREB's High Schools That Work and Simulated Work Place initiates.

== Partnerships ==
Calhoun County Middle High School has been a long-standing partner with Glenville State University. Through the collaboration, college classes have been made available to high school students and the local community. Additionally, West Virginia University has worked with Calhoun High School to offer students higher education classes.

== Calhoun County Middle/High School Alma Mater ==
"Alma Mater, Calhoun High
We stand to sing thy praise,
With hearts that fill with worthy pride
At thought of high school days.
Our friendship true, our spirit too,
A part of us shall be.
Alma Mater, Calhoun High
We will be true to thee
Yes, through the long, long years to come
Wherever we may be,
Alma Mater, Calhoun High
We will be true to thee."
