= Joker, West Virginia =

- Unincorporated community
- Location within the state of West Virginia Joker (the United States)
- Coordinates: 38°54′21″N 81°10′10″W
- Country: United States
- State: West Virginia
- County: Calhoun
- Elevation: 1,106 ft (337 m)
- Time zone: UTC-5 (Eastern (EST))
  - Summer (DST): UTC-4 (EDT)
- GNIS ID: 1549763

Joker is an unincorporated community in Calhoun County, West Virginia, United States. Its post office is closed.

The community was named after Joker Sewel, a local merchant. The village once had a store, post office and the Bryner Chapel Methodist Church. The store was operated for many years by the Bryners, Dawsons and Gainers.
