= Cotton Tufts =

American politician

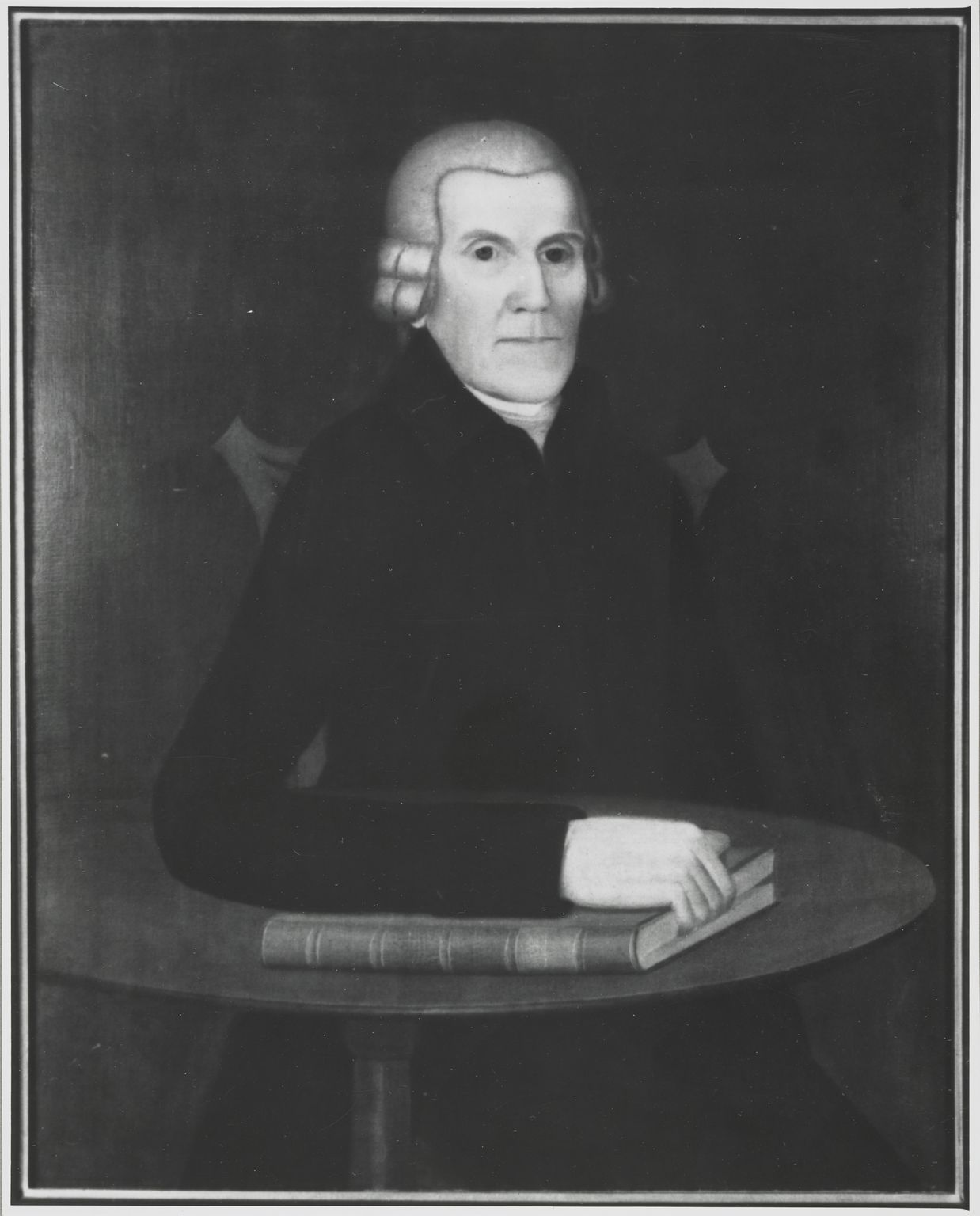
- Born: 30 May 1732
- Died: 8 December 1815 (aged 83)
- Occupation: Politician, medical doctor
- Parent(s): Simon Tufts
- Awards: Fellow of the American Academy of Arts and Sciences (1780–)

Cotton Tufts (30 May 1734 in Medford, Province of Massachusetts – 8 December 1815 in Weymouth, Massachusetts) was a Massachusetts physician. He was a cousin of Abigail Adams.

== Biography ==
Cotton graduated from Harvard in 1749, studied medicine, and settled at Weymouth. He was one of the original members of the Massachusetts Medical Society, its president 1787–1795, and one of the founders of the Academy of Arts and Sciences in 1780. In 1765 he wrote spirited and patriotic instructions to the representatives of Weymouth against the Stamp Act. He was a representative of the state and a councillor, for many years an active member of the state senate, and supported in the convention the adoption of the U.S. Constitution.

== Legacy ==
On April 19, 1775, British forces were returning to Boston from the Battles of Lexington and Concord, the opening engagements of the war. On their march they were continually shot at by colonial militiamen. Dr. Cotton Tufts saved the life of Samuel Whittemore who at the time was 78 years old and fought against the British in what is now Arlington, Massachusetts, on April 19, 1775.

Whittemore was in his fields when he spotted an approaching British relief brigade under Earl Percy, sent to assist the retreat. Whittemore loaded his musket and ambushed the British from behind a nearby stone wall, killing one soldier. He then drew his dueling pistols and killed a grenadier and mortally wounded a second. By the time Whittemore had fired his third shot, a British detachment reached his position; Whittemore drew his sword and attacked. He was shot in the face, bayoneted thirteen times, and left for dead in a pool of blood in Menotomy (present-day Arlington). He was found alive, trying to load his musket to fight again. He was taken to Dr. Cotton Tufts of Medford, who perceived no hope for his survival. However, Whittemore lived another 18 years until dying of natural causes at the age of 96.

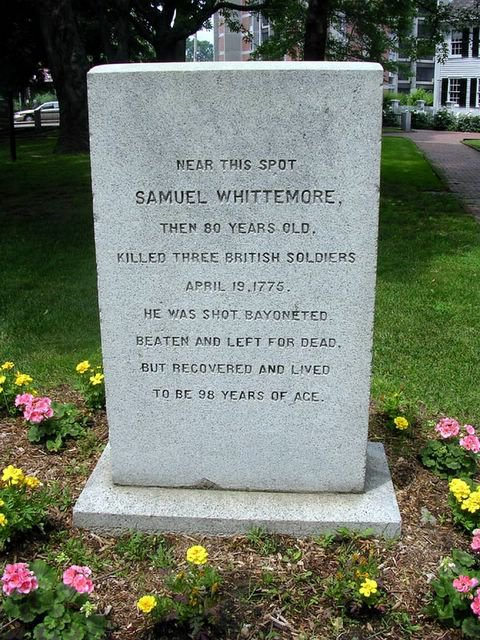
Samuel Whittemore Monument located in Arlington, Massachusetts. Dr. Cotton Tufts saved the life of Samuel Whittemore on April 19th 1775.
