= Bigbend, West Virginia =

Unincorporated community in West Virginia, United States

Big Bend, West Virginia Brooksville
- Unincorporated community
- Location within the state of West Virginia Big Bend (the United States)
- Coordinates: 38°57′49″N 81°9′42″W
- Country: United States
- State: West Virginia
- County: Calhoun
- Time zone: UTC-5 (Eastern (EST))
  - Summer (DST): UTC-4 (EDT)
- ZIP codes: 26136

Big Bend (shown as Bigbend on federal maps) is an unincorporated community in Calhoun County, West Virginia, United States. It lies along West Virginia Route 5 northwest of the town of Grantsville, the county seat of Calhoun County, along the Little Kanawha River. Its elevation is 682 feet (208 m). It has a post office with the ZIP code 26136.

Big Bend was previously known as Brooksville, in honor of Preston Brooks, pro-slavery representative from South Carolina, who attacked and seriously injured Massachusetts Senator Charles Sumner. At that time it was the county seat. At the end of the Civil War, and West Virginia's separation from Virginia, it was replaced by a new county seat with the name of Union General Ulysses S. Grant.
