= Freed, West Virginia =

Unincorporated community in West Virginia, United States

- Unincorporated community
- Location within the state of West Virginia Freed (the United States)
- Coordinates: 39°0′39″N 81°8′16″W
- Country: United States
- State: West Virginia
- County: Calhoun
- Elevation: 761 ft (232 m)
- Time zone: UTC-5 (Eastern (EST))
  - Summer (DST): UTC-4 (EDT)
- GNIS ID: 1549692

Freed is an unincorporated community in Calhoun County, West Virginia, United States.

The community most likely was named after the local Freed family.

== See also ==
- List of ghost towns in West Virginia
