= Mount Zion, West Virginia =

- Unincorporated community
- Location within the state of West Virginia Mount Zion (the United States)
- Coordinates: 38°51′43″N 81°7′26″W
- Country: United States
- State: West Virginia
- County: Calhoun
- Time zone: UTC-5 (Eastern (EST))
  - Summer (DST): UTC-4 (EDT)
- ZIP codes: 26151

Mount Zion is an unincorporated community in Calhoun County, West Virginia, United States. It lies along West Virginia Route 16 to the south of the town of Grantsville, the county seat of Calhoun County. Its elevation is 1,132 feet (345 m). Mount Zion's ZIP code is 26151.

Mt. Zion is home to several of Calhoun County's essential buildings. The list includes the state road garage, Calhoun Middle/High School, and the Mt. Zion Drive In Theater & Restaurant, formerly one of only 368 drive-in theaters left in the nation. Built in 1950, the theater is now closed.
