= Linden, West Virginia =

Linden
- Unincorporated community
- Location within the state of West Virginia Linden (the United States)
- Coordinates: 38°43′11″N 81°12′39″W
- Country: United States
- State: West Virginia
- County: Roane
- Time zone: UTC-5 (Eastern (EST))
  - Summer (DST): UTC-4 (EDT)

Linden is an unincorporated community in Roane County, West Virginia, United States, along the Henry Fork. Its elevation is 755 feet (230 m).

The community has the name of Charles Linden Broadus, a Confederate Army officer.
