= Mudfork, West Virginia =

- Unincorporated community
- Location within the state of West Virginia
- Coordinates: 38°38′21″N 81°04′30″W
- Country: United States
- State: West Virginia
- County: Calhoun
- Time zone: UTC-5 (Eastern (EST))
  - Summer (DST): UTC-4 (EDT)
- GNIS ID: 1549841

Mudfork is an unincorporated community in Calhoun County, West Virginia, United States. It lies at an elevation of 902 feet (275 m).

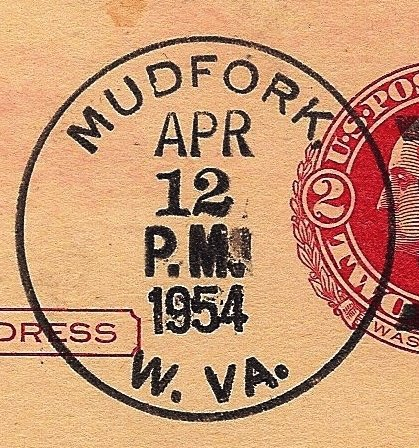
