= Big Springs, West Virginia =

Unincorporated community in West Virginia, United States

- Unincorporated community
- Location within the state of West Virginia Big Springs (the United States)
- Coordinates: 38°39′23″N 81°4′28″W
- Country: United States
- State: West Virginia
- County: Calhoun
- Time zone: UTC-5 (Eastern (EST))
  - Summer (DST): UTC-4 (EDT)
- ZIP codes: 26137

Big Springs (also Bigsprings, Chestnut Grove, or Fort Evans) is an unincorporated community in Calhoun County, West Virginia, United States. It lies along West Virginia Route 16 to the north of the town of Grantsville, the county seat of Calhoun County. Its elevation is 771 feet (235 m). It has a post office with the ZIP code 26137.

The community was so named on account of there being springs near the original town site.
