= Henrietta, West Virginia =

- Unincorporated community
- Location within the state of West Virginia Henrietta (the United States)
- Coordinates: 38°54′29″N 81°2′41″W
- Country: United States
- State: West Virginia
- County: Calhoun
- Elevation: 709 ft (216 m)
- Time zone: UTC-5 (Eastern (EST))
  - Summer (DST): UTC-4 (EDT)
- GNIS ID: 1554683

Henrietta is an unincorporated community in Calhoun County, West Virginia, United States. A town with the same name located in Virginia appears in the Raven Cycle series by Maggie Stiefvater; there is no clear connection between Henrietta, West Virginia, and Henrietta, Virginia, which is fictional.
