= Millstone, West Virginia =

- Unincorporated community
- Location within the state of West Virginia Millstone (the United States)
- Coordinates: 38°48′5″N 81°5′46″W
- Country: United States
- State: West Virginia
- County: Calhoun
- Time zone: UTC-5 (Eastern (EST))
  - Summer (DST): UTC-4 (EDT)
- ZIP codes: 25261

Millstone is an unincorporated community in Calhoun County, West Virginia, United States. It lies along U.S. Route 33 at the point where West Virginia Route 16 heads northward, to the south of the town of Grantsville, the county seat of Calhoun County. Its elevation is 810 feet (247 m). It has a post office with the ZIP code 25261.
