= Richardson, West Virginia =

- Unincorporated community
- Location in West Virginia. Richardson (the United States)
- Coordinates: 38°51′55″N 81°14′11″W
- Country: United States
- State: West Virginia
- County: Calhoun
- Elevation: 689 ft (210 m)
- Time zone: UTC-5 (Eastern (EST))
  - Summer (DST): UTC-4 (EDT)
- GNIS ID: 1555474

Richardson is an unincorporated community in Calhoun County, West Virginia, United States.

== History ==
The community was founded Charles H. Richardson in 1866. Richardson was the village's postmaster for a time. He served in the West Virginia House of Delegates in 1885. The village boomed c.1900, an event linked to oil and gas discovery. The community had a water mill on the West Fork of the Little Kanawha, as well as a church, general stores, a hotel, a barbershop, a shoemaker, a blacksmith shop, a doctor's office, drug store, a lumber dealer, and numerous livestock producers. After the oil and gas boom came to the area in the early 1900s, drilling was followed by the construction of a large gas compressor station with company houses, and featured 20th century rejuvenation of the village.
