= Euclid, West Virginia =

Unincorporated community in West Virginia, United States

- Unincorporated community
- Location within the state of West Virginia Euclid (the United States)
- Coordinates: 38°43′59″N 81°2′40″W
- Country: United States
- State: West Virginia
- County: Calhoun
- Elevation: 794 ft (242 m)
- Time zone: UTC-5 (Eastern (EST))
  - Summer (DST): UTC-4 (EDT)
- GNIS ID: 1549675

Euclid is an unincorporated community in Calhoun County, West Virginia, United States. Its post office has closed.

The community was named after Dalton Euclid Reip, the son of a man credited with securing the town a post office.
