= Chloe, West Virginia =

Unincorporated community in West Virginia, United States

- Unincorporated community
- Location within the state of West Virginia Chloe (the United States)
- Coordinates: 38°41′33″N 81°5′11″W
- Country: United States
- State: West Virginia
- County: Calhoun
- Time zone: UTC-5 (Eastern (EST))
  - Summer (DST): UTC-4 (EDT)
- ZIP codes: 25235

Chloe is an unincorporated community in Calhoun County, West Virginia, United States. It lies along West Virginia Route 16 and the West Fork Little Kanawha River, to the south of the towns of Grantsville (the county seat) and Arnoldsburg. Its elevation is 794 feet (242 m). It has a post office with the ZIP code 25235.
