= White Pine, West Virginia =

- Unincorporated community
- Location within the state of West Virginia White Pine (the United States)
- Coordinates: 38°56′48″N 81°1′45″W
- Country: United States
- State: West Virginia
- County: Calhoun
- Elevation: 784 ft (239 m)
- Time zone: UTC-5 (Eastern (EST))
  - Summer (DST): UTC-4 (EDT)
- GNIS ID: 1549987

White Pine is an unincorporated community in Calhoun County, West Virginia, United States.
