= Hur, West Virginia =

- Unincorporated community
- Location within the state of West Virginia Hur (the United States)
- Coordinates: 38°52′24″N 81°10′10″W
- Country: United States
- State: West Virginia
- County: Calhoun
- Elevation: 1,152 ft (351 m)
- Time zone: UTC-5 (Eastern (EST))
  - Summer (DST): UTC-4 (EDT)
- GNIS ID: 1554758

Hur is an unincorporated community in Calhoun County, West Virginia, United States. Its post office has closed. Named after novel "Ben Hur." The village once had three stores and two grist mills. A crank'em up single wire phone company that served a large area that operated into the 1960s and the Mt. Olive Methodist Church which was established in 1879. It is the home of a widely read Internet newspaper, the Hur Herald, established in 1996 by Bob Weaver. Population never exceeded 40.
