= Creston, West Virginia =

Unincorporated community in West Virginia, United States

Creston
- Unincorporated community
- Location within the state of West Virginia Creston (the United States)
- Coordinates: 38°56′49″N 81°16′15″W
- Country: United States
- State: West Virginia
- County: Wirt
- Time zone: UTC-5 (Eastern (EST))
  - Summer (DST): UTC-4 (EDT)
- ZIP codes: 26141

Creston is an unincorporated community in southeastern Wirt County, West Virginia, United States. It lies at the confluence of the Little Kanawha River and the West Fork Little Kanawha River on West Virginia Route 5, southeast of the town of Elizabeth, the county seat of Wirt County. Its elevation is 653 feet (199 m). Creston had a post office, which closed on June 25, 2011. The community was named for a drainage divide near the town site.

== Climate ==
The climate in this area is characterized by hot, humid summers and generally mild to cool winters. According to the Köppen Climate Classification system, Creston has a humid subtropical climate, abbreviated "Cfa" on climate maps.
