= Tariff, West Virginia =

- Unincorporated community
- Location within West Virginia Location within the United States
- Coordinates: 38°40′45″N 81°11′50″W
- Country: United States
- State: West Virginia
- County: Roane
- Elevation: 833 ft (254 m)
- Time zone: UTC-5 (Eastern (EST))
  - Summer (DST): UTC-4 (EDT)
- Area codes: 304 & 681
- GNIS feature ID: 1547906

Tariff is an unincorporated community in Roane County, West Virginia, United States. Tariff is located along County Route 27 and the Henry Fork, 12 miles (19 km) southeast of Spencer. Tariff had a post office, which opened on February 10, 1890, and closed on October 1, 2005.
