= Russet, West Virginia =

- Unincorporated community
- Nickname: Stumptown
- Location within the state of West Virginia Russet (the United States)
- Coordinates: 38°52′23″N 81°3′23″W
- Country: United States
- State: West Virginia
- County: Calhoun
- Elevation: 768 ft (234 m)
- Time zone: UTC−5 (Eastern (EST))
  - Summer (DST): UTC−4 (EDT)
- GNIS ID: 1555544

Russet is an unincorporated community in Calhoun County, West Virginia, United States.
