= The Calhoun Chronicle and The Grantsville News =

American newspaper

- Type: Weekly newspaper
- Format: Broadsheet
- Owner(s): Calhoun County Publishing
- Publisher: Helen Morris
- Editor: Newton Nichols
- Founded: 1883
- Headquarters: 353 Main St, Grantsville, Calhoun County, WV 26147
- Circulation: 2,921 (as of 2016)
- ISSN: 1040-399X
- OCLC number: 12766699
- Website: calhounchronicle.com

The Calhoun Chronicle and The Grantsville News is a weekly newspaper serving the Grantsville, West Virginia community. The older of its predecessors, the Calhoun Chronicle, was founded in 1883. It merged with the Grantsville News (founded 1902) in 1984, continuing the original numbering of the Chronicle.

The newspaper's decision in 1990 to enforce its policy of refusing political advertising within a week of an election led to a 1991 West Virginia Supreme Court ruling in favor of the paper. The supreme court ruled that the government could not compel a private newspaper to print anything without violating constitutional freedom of the press protections.

As of 2016, the newspaper is published each Thursday by Calhoun County Publishing Company and has circulation of 2,921.

== History ==
In the early 1880s Calhoun County was one of two counties in the state without a local paper. The Chronicle filled that gap with a democratic weekly. By 1898 the Weekly Register counted it as one of the best papers to come to their office.

In 1900, founder S. C. Barr announced that though the paper was Democratic, it would not be endorsing the Democratic nominee for U.S. president, William Jennings Bryan, citing the failure of the disasters Bryan had predicted in 1896 to appear:

"A rule of law is where a witness is impeached, or is overtaken In false statements; that his evidence Is not entitled to the same degree of credibility as it was before. If the statement of Mr. Bryan that the country was on the verge of ruin if we did not get 16 to 1 was untrue, might not his Imperialistic views also be far-fetched?"

Bryan went on to lose the election, and the paper was sold to S. C. Barr to Sam P. Bell and Robert E. Hays shortly afterwards.

Carl Morris, who won the supreme court case in 1991 guaranteeing private newspapers in West Virginia the autonomy to decide what it will not publish, owned the paper until his death in 2002 at age 83. A similar issue arose in 1998, when Morris refused to run an ad for Clay County Democrat Clay Walker. Morris objected to the content of the ad, which was critical of Walker's opponent; he expressed willingness to publish an ad for the same candidate if it simply focused on his own family and background.

As of 2016, the publisher was Helen Morris and the editor Newton Nichols.

== See also ==
- List of newspapers in West Virginia
