= Ayers, West Virginia =

Unincorporated community in West Virginia, United States

- Unincorporated community
- Location within the state of West Virginia Ayers (the United States)
- Coordinates: 38°58′41″N 81°5′54″W
- Country: United States
- State: West Virginia
- County: Calhoun
- Elevation: 741 ft (226 m)
- Time zone: UTC-5 (Eastern (EST))
  - Summer (DST): UTC-4 (EDT)
- GNIS ID: 1553771

Ayers is an unincorporated community in Calhoun County, West Virginia, United States. Its post office has closed.
