= Milo, West Virginia =

- Unincorporated community
- Location within the state of West Virginia Milo (the United States)
- Coordinates: 38°43′20″N 81°8′37″W
- Country: United States
- State: West Virginia
- County: Calhoun
- Elevation: 784 ft (239 m)
- Time zone: UTC-5 (Eastern (EST))
  - Summer (DST): UTC-4 (EDT)
- GNIS ID: 1549825

Milo is an unincorporated community in Calhoun County, West Virginia, United States.

The community was named after Milo Brennan, an area pioneer.
