= Nobe, West Virginia =

- Unincorporated community
- Location within West Virginia Location within the United States
- Coordinates: 38°59′11″N 81°02′03″W
- Country: United States
- State: West Virginia
- County: Calhoun
- Elevation: 1,112 ft (339 m)
- Time zone: UTC-5 (Eastern (EST))
  - Summer (DST): UTC-4 (EDT)
- ZIP codes: 26158
- Area codes: 304 & 681
- GNIS feature ID: 1555230

Nobe is an unincorporated community in Calhoun County, West Virginia, United States. Nobe is located on County Route 16/4 near the Gilmer County line, 5.5 miles (8.9 km) northeast of Grantsville.

The community most likely was named after an area resident.
