= Jedediah Purdy =

American legal scholar

- Born: Jedediah Spenser Purdy; November 29, 1974 (age 51); Chloe, West Virginia, United States
- Education: Phillips Exeter Academy, Harvard College; Yale Law School (Class of 2001)
- Scientific career
- Fields: Law
- Workplaces: Columbia University Duke University

Jedediah Spenser Purdy (born 29 November 1974 in Chloe, West Virginia) is an American legal scholar and cultural commentator. He teaches law at Duke University.

Purdy is the author of two widely discussed books: For Common Things: Irony, Trust, and Commitment in America Today (1999) and Being America: Liberty, Commerce and Violence in an American World (2003).

== Early life and education ==
Purdy, the son of Wally and Deirdre Purdy, was homeschooled in West Virginia until age 13, high school. He graduated from Phillips Exeter Academy and Harvard College, where he was inducted into Phi Beta Kappa as a junior in 1996 and became a Truman Scholar in 1997. He graduated from Yale Law School in its Class of 2001. His 1999 book For Common Things became a surprise success for its criticism of irony.

From 2001 to 2002, he was a fellow at the New America Foundation, a think tank that has been described in the Washington Post as radical centrist in orientation.

== Career ==
After law school, Purdy clerked for Pierre N. Leval of the United States Court of Appeals for the Second Circuit, in New York in 2002–2003. From 2004 to 2019, Purdy was a professor of law at Duke University teaching constitutional, environmental, and property law. He also served on the editorial advisory board of the Ethics & International Affairs.

Purdy was the William S. Beinecke Professor of Law at Columbia Law School from 2018 to 2022, teaching courses on American Constitutional Law, Constitutional Law and Democracy and its Crisis.

In 2022 he became the Raphael Lemkin Professor of Law at Duke University School of Law, where he teaches courses on Property and Past and Future of Capitalist Democracy.

== Works ==
- For Common Things: Irony, Trust, and Commitment in America Today, Knopf (1999)
- Being America: Liberty, Commerce and Violence in an American World, Vintage (2003)
- A Tolerable Anarchy: Rebels, Reactionaries, and the Making of American Freedom, Knopf (2009)
- The Meaning of Property: Freedom, Community and the Legal Imagination, Yale University Press (2010)
- Purdy, Jedediah (March 25, 2014). "The Accidental Neoliberal". n+1. Brooklyn, NY: n+1 Foundation, Inc.
- After Nature: A Politics for the Anthropocene, Harvard University Press (2015)
- This Land Is Our Land: The Struggle for a New Commonwealth, Princeton University Press (October 15, 2019) ISBN 978-0691195643
