= Hathaway, West Virginia =

- Unincorporated community
- Location within the state of West Virginia Hathaway (the United States)
- Coordinates: 38°51′28″N 81°4′59″W
- Country: United States
- State: West Virginia
- County: Calhoun
- Elevation: 728 ft (222 m)
- Time zone: UTC-5 (Eastern (EST))
  - Summer (DST): UTC-4 (EDT)
- GNIS ID: 1549732

Hathaway is an unincorporated community in Calhoun County, West Virginia, United States.
