= Kothakulangara =

- village
- Interactive map of Kothakulangara
- Coordinates: 10°12′0″N 76°22′0″E
- Country: India
- State: Kerala
- District: Ernakulam

Languages
  - Official: Malayalam, English
- Time zone: UTC+5:30 (IST)
- Vehicle registration: KL-63

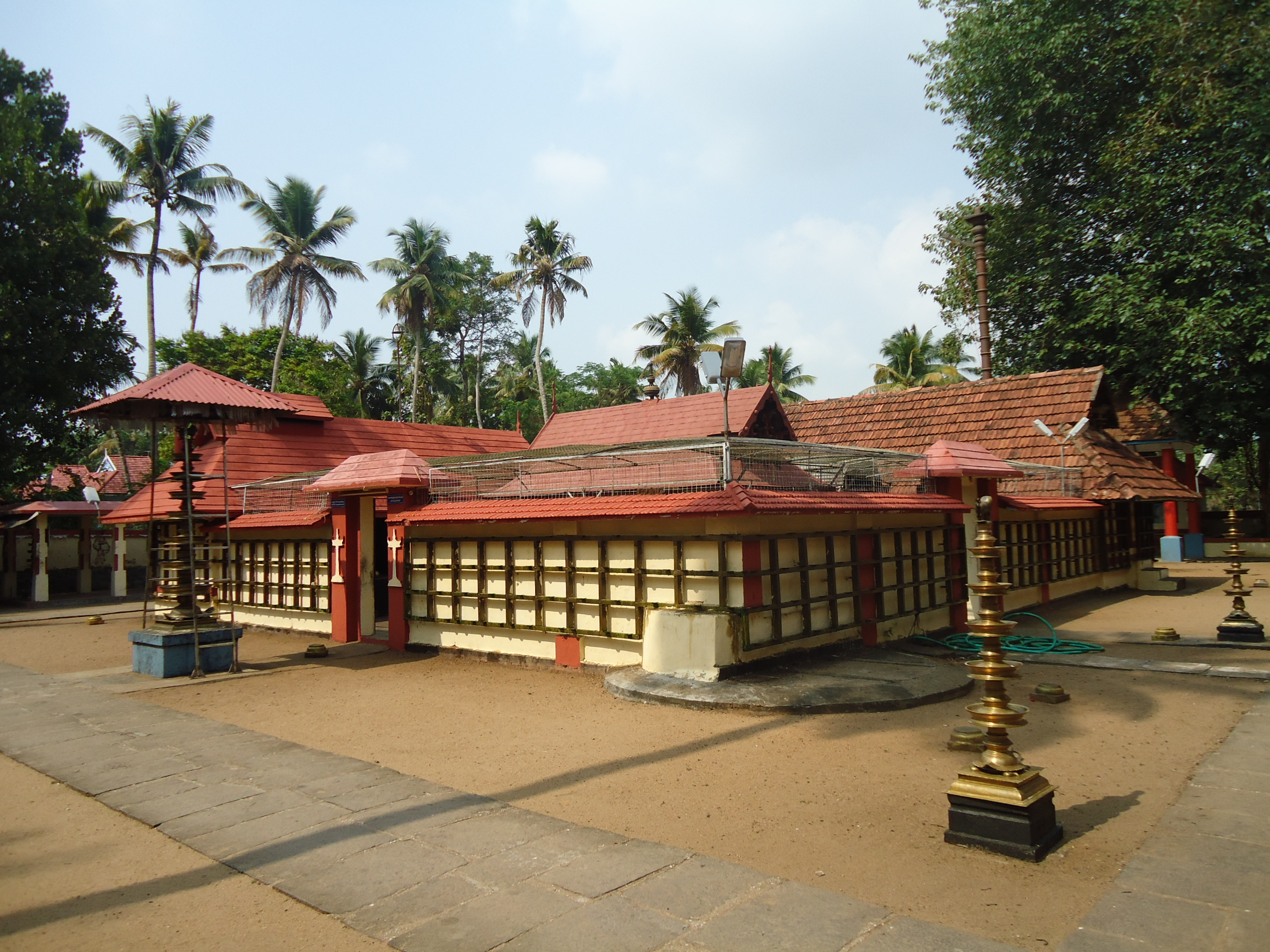
Bhagavathi Temple

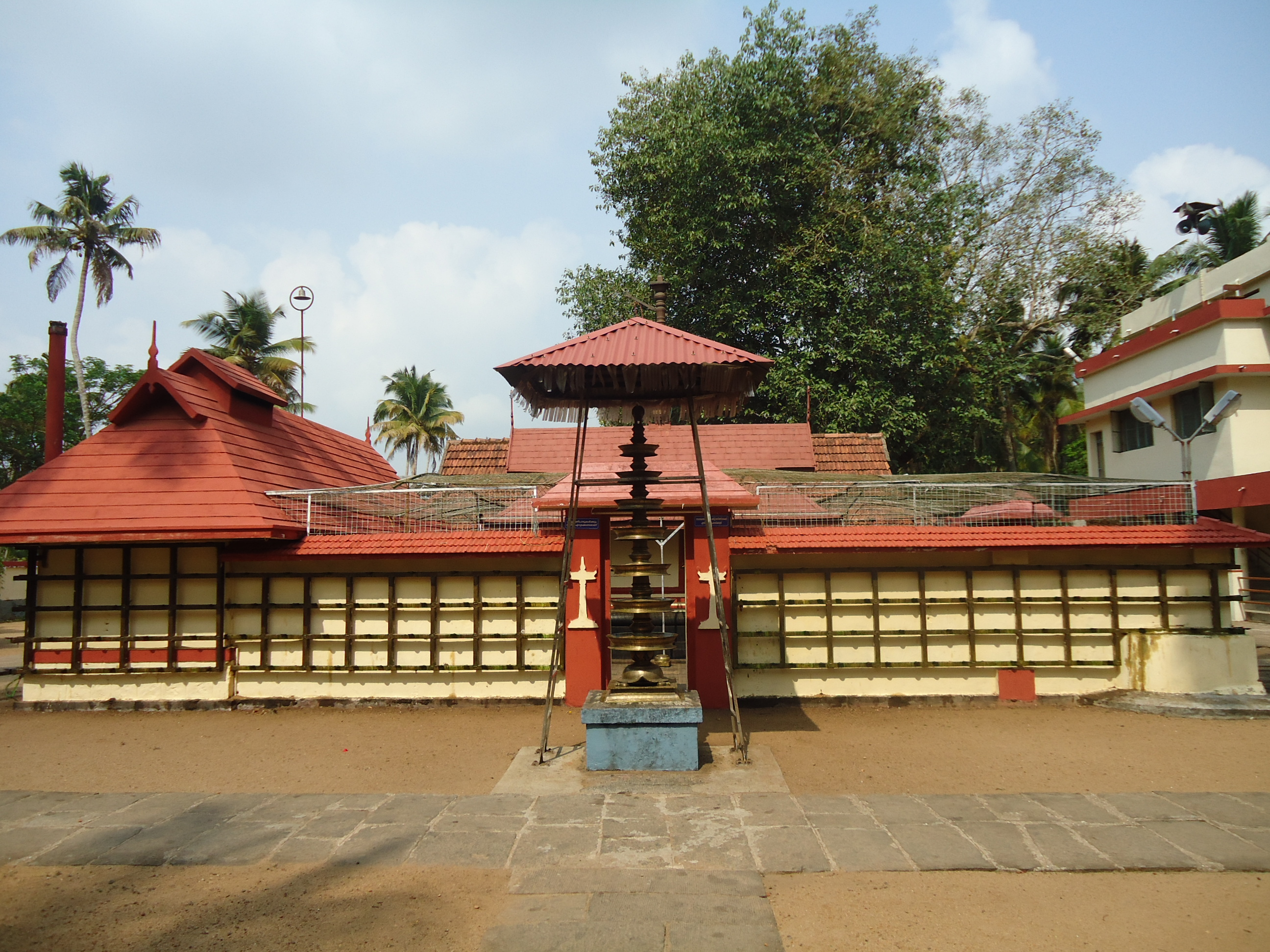
Bhagavathi Temple, another view

Kothakulangara is a village in Kerala, India, situated 400 m (¼ mile) north of Angamali town on the National Highway 47, in Ernakulam District, Kerala, India. Wards No 2, 3 and 4 of Angamali Municipality are included in Kothakulangara.

Kothakulangara has a mostly Hindu population. Famous Hindu Nair Families live there. It has more than 400 houses. Most residents are related to each other. Orma Marble Palace is situated at Kothakulangara. The Canal Branch of the Chalakudy River runs through the town. The KG Hospital, one of the well known hospital in Angamaly, is situated near to this place. Don Bosco of the Salesian Fathers started a school here. Cultural activities are being conducted annually by NSS Karayogam, one of the oldest Nair service society Branch.

The residents have formed a new association called KTN - Kothakulangara Residents Association which has evolved into a strong forum for the residents to voice their rights to the local councils, improve the civic amenities in the area and also to foster a responsible community living amongst the residents. KTN has kick started a lot of initiatives and have also formed a communication channel with the local municipal authorities to enable quick action on some of the initiatives.

== Temple ==
The Bhagavathi Temple which comes under Travencore Devaswaom Board is location in the area. The wealth it possessed caused Devaswam Board upgraded this temple to a Major Temple. Bhagavathy in this temple is very powerful. The festival in this temple is in January or February. The auditorium in this temple was open for the devotees of Sabarimala on the season.
