= Samuel Whittemore =

Oldest soldier in the American Revolution

Captain Samuel Whittemore
- Born: July 27, 1694; Charlestown, Massachusetts Bay, English America
- Died: February 2, 1793 (aged 98); Cambridge, Massachusetts, U.S.
- Burial place: Old Burying Ground in Arlington, Massachusetts
- Military career
- Allegiance: Great Britain: Province of Massachusetts Bay; United States
- Branch: British Army; Massachusetts Militia
- Service years: 1744–Prior to 1775; 1775
- Rank: Captain
- Units: Third Massachusetts Regiment
- Conflicts: War of Austrian Succession; King George's War; Siege of Louisbourg (1745); French and Indian War; Siege of Louisbourg (1758); Pontiac's War; American Revolutionary War; Battle of Lexington and Concord (WIA)

Samuel Whittemore Jr. (February 27, 1694 – February 2, 1793) was an American farmer and soldier who was 80 years old when he became the oldest known combatant in the American Revolutionary War (1775–1783).

== Biography ==
Whittemore was born in Charlestown, Massachusetts, in 1694, the second son by that name of Samuel Whittemore Sr. and Hannah Rix, also of Charlestown. He served as a private in Colonel Jeremiah Moulton's Third Massachusetts Regiment, where he fought in King George's War (1744–1748). He was involved in the capture of the French stronghold, the Fortress of Louisbourg in 1745. He moved to Menotomy, Massachusetts (present-day Arlington). Recent sources suggest he fought in the French and Indian War (1754–1763) at the age of 64, once again assisting in the capture of the Fortress of Louisbourg, and later in a military expedition against Chief Pontiac in 1763. None of them offer documentation to support such claims, though a nineteenth century reference mentions that he had served as a "Captain of Dragoons."

=== Battles of Lexington and Concord ===
On April 19, 1775, British forces were returning to Boston from the Battles of Lexington and Concord, the opening engagements of the war. On their march they were continually shot at by American militiamen.

Whittemore was in his fields when he spotted an approaching British relief brigade under Earl Percy, sent to assist the retreat. Whittemore loaded his musket and ambushed the British grenadiers of the 47th Regiment of Foot from behind a nearby stone wall, killing one soldier. He then drew his dueling pistols, killed a second grenadier and mortally wounded a third. By the time Whittemore had fired his third shot, a British detachment had reached his position; Whittemore drew his sword and attacked. He was subsequently shot in the face, bayoneted numerous times, and left for dead in a pool of blood. He was found by colonial forces, trying to load his musket to resume the fight. He was taken to Dr. Cotton Tufts of Medford, who perceived no hope for his survival. However, Whittemore recovered and lived another 18 years until dying of natural causes at the age of 98.

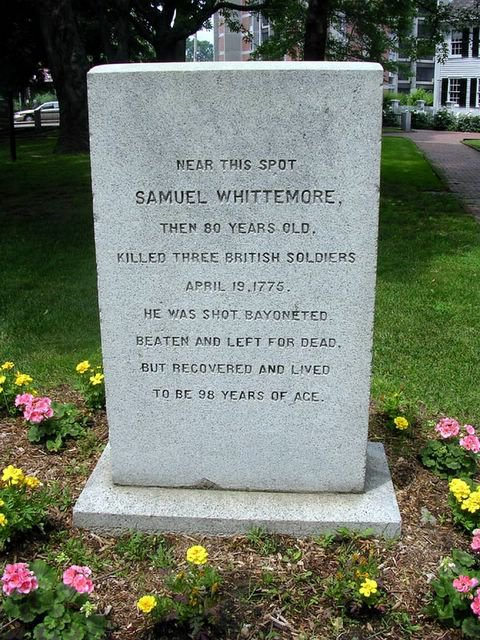
Samuel Whittemore Monument in Arlington, Massachusetts.

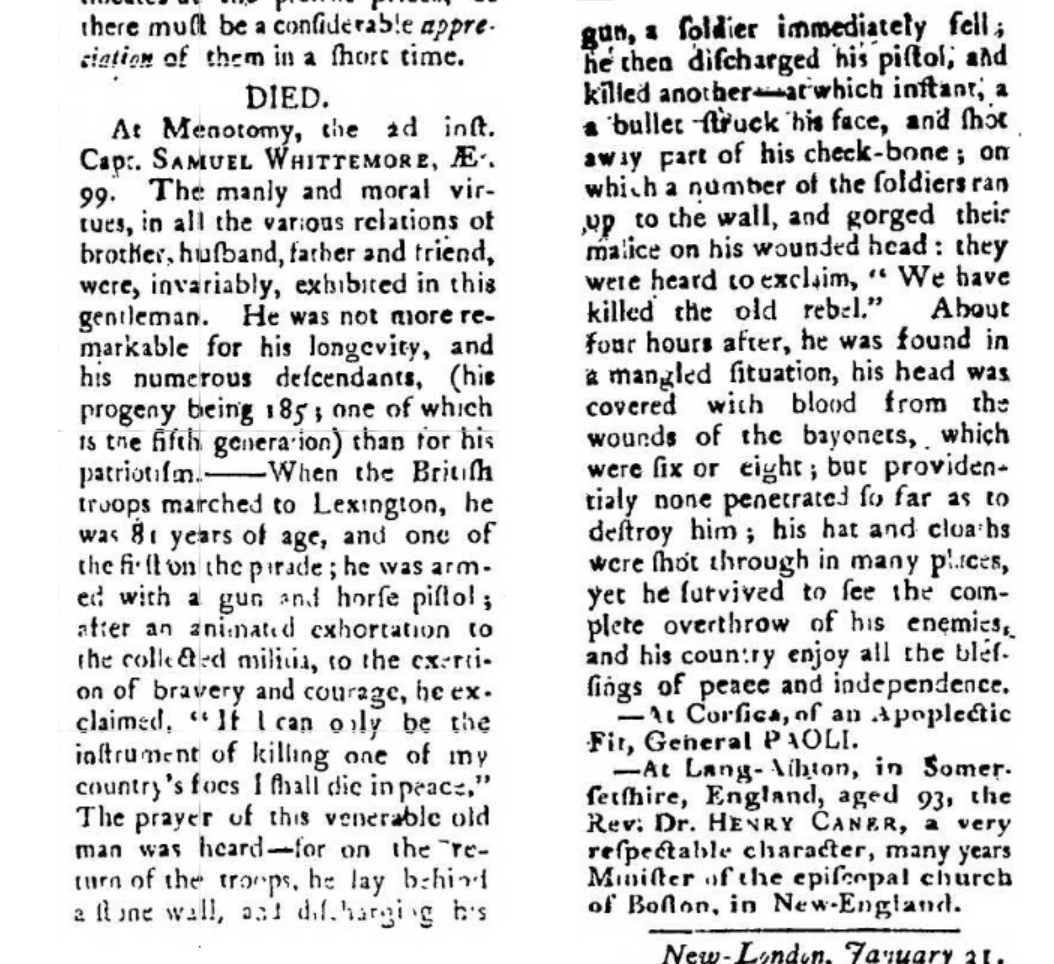
American Revolutionary War hero Samuel Wittemore's death announcement in 1793

=== The other Samuel Whittemore ===
A second Samuel Whittemore, known as Deacon Samuel, was active in Cambridge at the same time as Captain Samuel, and this causes confusion in some historical records. That Paige mentions them in the same paragraph indicates that the two are distinct.

Deacon Samuel, born on January 23, 1693, was Capt. Samuel’s nephew. A parish record, in recording his death in 1784 at age 90, indicates that the deacon was the older of the two.

== Legacy ==
A monument stands in the corner plot (611 Mass Ave.) called Whittemore Park at the northeast corner of Massachusetts Avenue and Mystic Street in Arlington, Massachusetts; it reads (inaccurately as to age both at the time and 18 years later):

Near this spot, Samuel Whittemore, then 80 years old, killed three British soldiers, April 19, 1775. He was shot, bayoneted, beaten and left for dead, but recovered and lived to be 98 years of age.

In 2005, Massachusetts Senator Robert Havern III proposed that Whittemore be proclaimed the official state hero of Massachusetts and his memory be commemorated on February 3 each year.
