= Bernard P. Bell =

United States Army Medal of Honor recipient (1911–1971)

Bernard Pious Bell
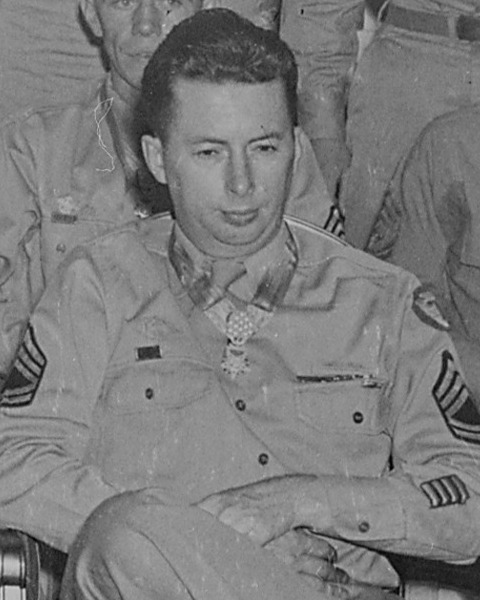
- Bernard Bell after receiving his Medal of Honor from President Harry S. Truman on August 23, 1945
- Born: December 29, 1911; Grantsville, West Virginia, US
- Died: January 8, 1971 (aged 59)
- Burial place: Arlington National Cemetery, Section 25
- Military career
- Allegiance: United States of America
- Branch: United States Army
- Service years: 1942–1945
- Rank: Warrant Officer
- Units: 142d Infantry Regiment, 36th Infantry Division
- Conflicts: World War II
- Awards: Medal of Honor; Distinguished Service Cross; Silver Star Medal (2)

Bernard Pious Bell (December 29, 1911 – January 8, 1971) was a United States Army soldier and a recipient of the United States military's highest decoration, the Medal of Honor, for his actions in World War II.

== Biography ==
Born at Grantsville, West Virginia, Bell entered the Army from New York City in August 1942. He earned the Medal of Honor while serving with Company I, 142nd Infantry Regiment, 36th Infantry Division at Mittelwihr, France on December 18, 1944. He left the Army on June 19, 1945, with the rank of warrant officer.

He died on January 8, 1971, after accidentally choking to death while eating, and was buried at Arlington National Cemetery in Arlington, Virginia.

== Medal of Honor citation ==
Bell's official Medal of Honor citation reads:

Rank and organization: Technical Sergeant, U.S. Army, Company I, 142d Infantry, 36th Infantry Division. Place and date: Mittelwihr, France, December 18, 1944. Entered service at: New York, N.Y. Birth: Grantsville, West Virginia. G.O. No.: 73, August 30, 1945.

Citation:

For fighting gallantly at Mittelwihr, France. On the morning of December 18, 1944, he led a squad against a schoolhouse held by enemy troops. While his men covered him, he dashed toward the building, surprised two guards at the door and took them prisoner without firing a shot. He found that other Germans were in the cellar. These he threatened with hand grenades, forcing 26 in all to emerge and surrender. His squad then occupied the building and prepared to defend it against powerful enemy action. The next day, the enemy poured artillery and mortar barrages into the position, disrupting communications which T/Sgt. Bell repeatedly repaired under heavy small-arms fire as he crossed dangerous terrain to keep his company commander informed of the squad's situation. During the day, several prisoners were taken and other Germans killed when hostile forces were attracted to the schoolhouse by the sound of captured German weapons fired by the Americans. At dawn the next day the enemy prepared to assault the building. A German tank fired round after round into the structure, partially demolishing the upper stories. Despite this heavy fire, T/Sgt. Bell climbed to the second floor and directed artillery fire which forced the hostile tank to withdraw. He then adjusted mortar fire on large forces of enemy foot soldiers attempting to reach the American position and, when this force broke and attempted to retire, he directed deadly machine gun and rifle fire into their disorganized ranks. Calling for armored support to blast out the German troops hidden behind a wall, he unhesitatingly exposed himself to heavy small-arms fire to stand beside a friendly tank and tell its occupants where to rip holes in walls protecting approaches to the school building. He then trained machine guns on the gaps and mowed down all hostile troops attempting to cross the openings to get closer to the school building. By his intrepidity and bold, aggressive leadership, T/Sgt. Bell enabled his 8-man squad to drive back approximately 150 of the enemy, killing at least 87 and capturing 42. Personally, he killed more than 20 and captured 33 prisoners.

== See also ==
- List of Medal of Honor recipients
- List of Medal of Honor recipients for World War II
