= Cooks Run (Rattail Branch) =

Stream in Ohio, United States

Coordinates: 39°31′43″N 84°07′25″W

Cooks Run is a stream in the U.S. state of Ohio. It is a tributary to Rattail Branch.

Cooks Run was named in honor of a local family.
