= Nebo, Clay County, West Virginia =

Nebo, West Virginia
- Unincorporated community
- Location within West Virginia Location within the United States
- Coordinates: 38°38′04″N 81°02′33″W
- Country: United States
- State: West Virginia
- County: Clay
- Elevation: 935 ft (285 m)
- Time zone: UTC-5 (Eastern (EST))
  - Summer (DST): UTC-4 (EDT)
- ZIP code: 25141
- Area codes: 304 & 681
- GNIS feature ID: 1549845

Nebo is an unincorporated community in Clay County, West Virginia, United States. Nebo is located on West Virginia Route 16, 12 miles (19 km) north-northeast of Clay, along the Stinson Creek near its source. Nebo no longer has a post office, which came under the aegis of ZIP code 25141.
