= Sycamore, Calhoun County, West Virginia =

Sycamore, West Virginia
- Unincorporated community
- Location within the state of West Virginia Sycamore (the United States)
- Coordinates: 38°50′7″N 81°5′43″W
- Country: United States
- State: West Virginia
- County: Calhoun
- Elevation: 794 ft (242 m)
- Time zone: UTC-5 (Eastern (EST))
  - Summer (DST): UTC-4 (EDT)
- GNIS ID: 1555772

Sycamore is an unincorporated community in Calhoun County, West Virginia, United States.
