= Leatherbark, West Virginia =

- Unincorporated community
- Location within the state of West Virginia Leatherbark (the United States)
- Coordinates: 38°47′18″N 81°11′48″W
- Country: United States
- State: West Virginia
- County: Calhoun
- Elevation: 764 ft (233 m)
- Time zone: UTC-5 (Eastern (EST))
  - Summer (DST): UTC-4 (EDT)
- ZIP codes: 25254
- GNIS ID: 1554932

Leatherbark is an unincorporated community in Calhoun County, West Virginia, United States. Its post office is closed.

The community was named after a type of plant native to the area.
