= Beech, West Virginia =

Unincorporated community in West Virginia, United States

- Unincorporated community
- Location within the state of West Virginia Beech (the United States)
- Coordinates: 38°45′45″N 81°10′20″W
- Country: United States
- State: West Virginia
- County: Calhoun
- Elevation: 745 ft (227 m)
- Time zone: UTC-5 (Eastern (EST))
  - Summer (DST): UTC-4 (EDT)
- GNIS ID: 1549585

Beech is an unincorporated community in Calhoun County, West Virginia, United States.
