= Calhoun County Schools (West Virginia) =

School district in West Virginia, United States

Location
- Calhoun County, West Virginia

District information
- Type: Public
- Superintendent: Michael Fitzwater
- NCES District ID: 5400210

Other information
- Website: boe.calhoun.k12.wv.us

Calhoun County Schools is the operating school district within Calhoun County, West Virginia.

== Schools ==
The following schools are in Calhoun County Schools:

=== High Schools ===
- Calhoun County Middle/High School
- Calhoun-Gilmer Career Center

=== Middle Schools ===
- Calhoun County Middle/High School

=== Elementary Schools ===
- Arnoldsburg School
- Pleasant Hill School
