= Orma, West Virginia =

- Unincorporated community
- Location within the state of West Virginia Orma (the United States)
- Coordinates: 38°44′58″N 81°5′55″W
- Country: United States
- State: West Virginia
- County: Calhoun
- Time zone: UTC-5 (Eastern (EST))
  - Summer (DST): UTC-4 (EDT)
- ZIP codes: 25268

Orma is an unincorporated community in Calhoun County, West Virginia, United States. It lies along West Virginia Route 16 and the West Fork Little Kanawha River, to the south of the town of Grantsville, the county seat of Calhoun County. Its elevation is 738 feet (225 m). It has a post office with the ZIP code 25268.

The community was named after Orma Stalnaker.
