= Arnoldsburg, West Virginia =

Unincorporated community in West Virginia, United States

- Unincorporated community
- Location within the state of West Virginia Arnoldsburg (the United States)
- Coordinates: 38°47′20″N 81°7′39″W
- Country: United States
- State: West Virginia
- County: Calhoun
- Time zone: UTC-5 (Eastern (EST))
  - Summer (DST): UTC-4 (EDT)
- ZIP codes: 25234

Arnoldsburg (also Arnoldsburgh) is an unincorporated community in Calhoun County, West Virginia, United States. It lies along U.S. Route 33 at the point where West Virginia Route 16 heads southward; it is several miles south of the county seat of Grantsville. Its elevation is 738 feet (225 m). The West Fork Little Kanawha River flows through the community. It has a post office with the ZIP code 25234.

Arnoldsburg derives its name from Charles Arnold, a local schoolteacher.
