= Calhoun County, West Virginia =

County in West Virginia, United States

- County
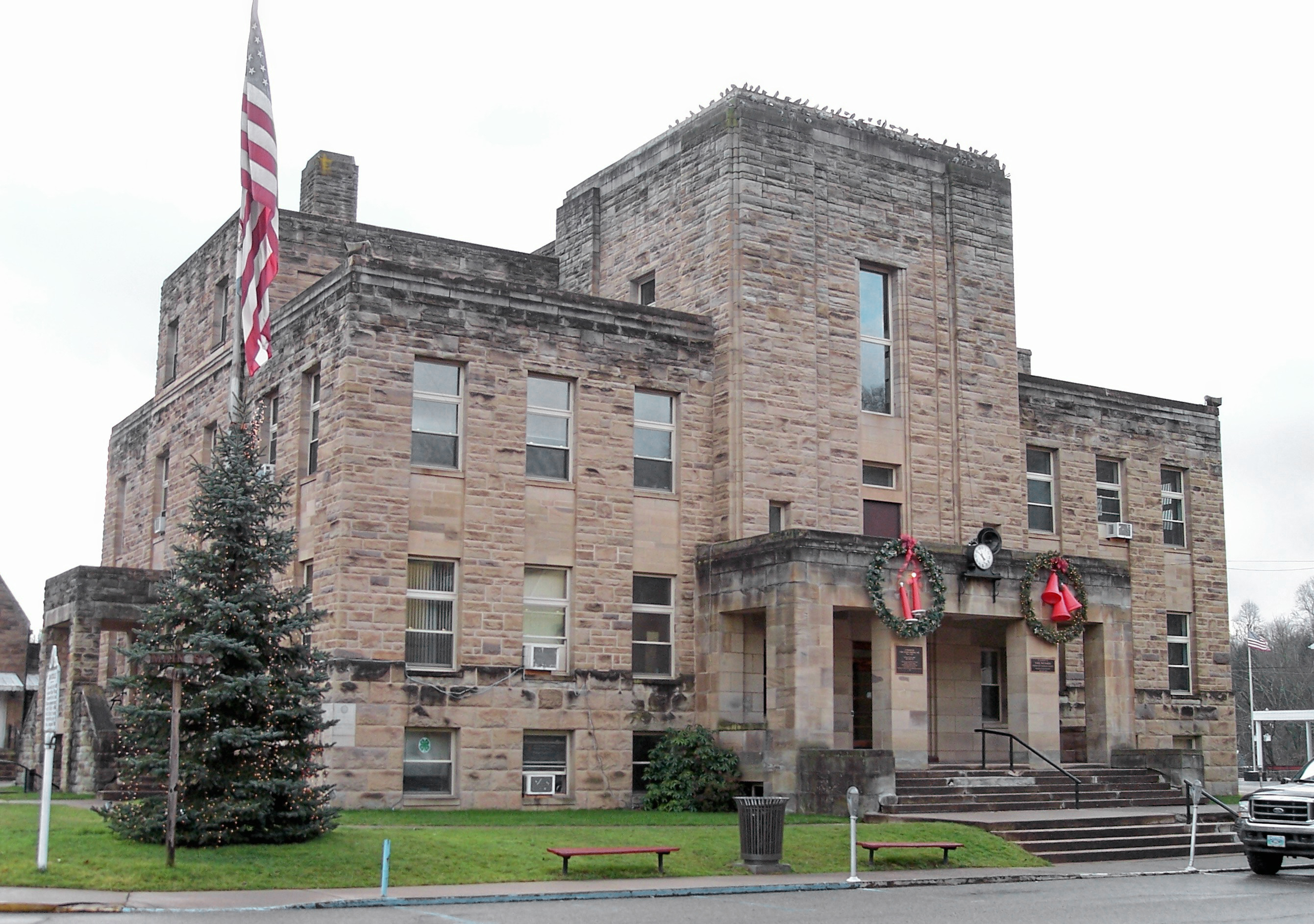
- The Calhoun County Courthouse in Grantsville

- Flag

- Location within the U.S. state of West Virginia
- Coordinates: 38°50′N 81°07′W
- Country: United States
- State: West Virginia
- Founded: March 5, 1856
- Named for: John C. Calhoun
- Seat: Grantsville
- Largest town: Grantsville

Area
  - Total: 281 sq mi (730 km^{2})
  - Land: 279 sq mi (720 km^{2})
  - Water: 1.4 sq mi (3.6 km^{2}) 0.5%

Population (2020)
  - Total: 6,229
  - Estimate (2025): 5,978 ▼
  - Density: 22.3/sq mi (8.62/km^{2})
- Time zone: UTC−5 (Eastern)
  - Summer (DST): UTC−4 (EDT)
- Congressional district: 1st
- Website: www.calhouncountywv.com

Calhoun County is a county in the U.S. state of West Virginia. As of the 2020 census, the population was 6,229, making it the third-least populous county in West Virginia. Its county seat is Grantsville. The county was founded in 1856 and named for South Carolina politician John C. Calhoun.

== Geography ==
According to the United States Census Bureau, the county has a total area of 281 square miles (730 km^{2}), of which 279 square miles (720 km^{2}) is land and 1.4 square miles (3.6 km^{2}) (0.5%) is water.

In 1863, West Virginia's counties were divided into civil townships, with the intention of encouraging local government. This proved impractical in the heavily rural state, and in 1872 the townships were converted into magisterial districts. Calhoun County was divided into five districts: Centre, Lee, Sheridan, Sherman, and Washington. Between 1980 and 1990, the county was reorganized into five new magisterial districts: District 1, District 2, District 3, District 4, and District 5.

=== Major highways ===
- U.S. Highway 33/U.S. Highway 119
- West Virginia Route 5
- West Virginia Route 16

=== Adjacent counties ===
- Ritchie County (north)
- Gilmer County (east)
- Braxton County (southeast)
- Clay County (south)
- Roane County (west)
- Wirt County (northwest)

== Demographics ==
Historical population
Census	Pop.	Note	%±
1860	2,502		—
1870	2,939		17.5%
1880	6,072		106.6%
1890	8,155		34.3%
1900	10,266		25.9%
1910	11,258		9.7%
1920	10,268		−8.8%
1930	10,866		5.8%
1940	12,455		14.6%
1950	10,259		−17.6%
1960	7,948		−22.5%
1970	7,046		−11.3%
1980	8,250		17.1%
1990	7,885		−4.4%
2000	7,582		−3.8%
2010	7,627		0.6%
2020	6,229		−18.3%
2025 (est.)	5,978	▼	−4.0%
U.S. Decennial Census; 1790–1960 1900–1990; 1990–2000 2010–2020

=== 2020 census ===
As of the 2020 census, the county had a population of 6,229. Of the residents, 19.6% were under the age of 18 and 24.3% were 65 years of age or older; the median age was 48.4 years. For every 100 females there were 100.4 males, and for every 100 females age 18 and over there were 100.4 males.

The racial makeup of the county was 96.4% White, 0.2% Black or African American, 0.2% American Indian and Alaska Native, 0.2% Asian, none from some other race, and 3.0% from two or more races. Hispanic or Latino residents of any race comprised 0.8% of the population.

There were 2,699 households in the county, of which 25.7% had children under the age of 18 living with them and 22.7% had a female householder with no spouse or partner present. About 29.8% of all households were made up of individuals and 15.8% had someone living alone who was 65 years of age or older.

There were 3,181 housing units, of which 15.2% were vacant. Among occupied housing units, 79.2% were owner-occupied and 20.8% were renter-occupied. The homeowner vacancy rate was 2.1% and the rental vacancy rate was 12.5%.

Calhoun County, West Virginia – Racial and ethnic composition Note: the US Census treats Hispanic/Latino as an ethnic category. This table excludes Latinos from the racial categories and assigns them to a separate category. Hispanics/Latinos may be of any race.
Race / Ethnicity (NH = Non-Hispanic)	Pop 2000	Pop 2010	Pop 2020	% 2000	% 2010	% 2020
White alone (NH)	7,473	7,465	5,976	98.56%	97.87%	95.93%
Black or African American alone (NH)	6	15	13	0.07%	0.19%	0.20%
Native American or Alaska Native alone (NH)	19	21	12	0.25%	0.27%	0.19%
Asian alone (NH)	8	12	12	0.10%	0.15%	0.19%
Pacific Islander alone (NH)	0	3	2	0.00%	0.03%	0.03%
Other race alone (NH)	2	1	2	0.02%	0.01%	0.03%
Mixed race or Multiracial (NH)	32	53	164	0.42%	0.69%	2.63%
Hispanic or Latino (any race)	42	57	48	0.55%	0.74%	0.77%
Total	7,582	7,627	6,229	100.00%	100.00%	100.00%

=== 2010 census ===
As of the 2010 United States census, there were 7,627 people, 3,268 households, and 2,178 families living in the county. The population density was 27.3 inhabitants per square mile (10.5/km^{2}). There were 3,963 housing units at an average density of 14.2 per square mile (5.5/km^{2}). The racial makeup of the county was 98.4% white, 0.3% American Indian, 0.2% black or African American, 0.2% Asian, 0.2% from other races, and 0.7% from two or more races. Those of Hispanic or Latino origin made up 0.7% of the population. In terms of ancestry, 22.4% were German, 21.3% were Irish, 7.7% were American, 7.3% were English, and 5.7% were Dutch.

Of the 3,268 households, 26.5% had children under the age of 18 living with them, 51.7% were married couples living together, 9.7% had a female householder with no husband present, 33.4% were non-families, and 28.5% of all households were made up of individuals. The average household size was 2.33 and the average family size was 2.80. The median age was 45.1 years.

The median income for a household in the county was $26,922 and the median income for a family was $34,897. Males had a median income of $32,229 versus $20,707 for females. The per capita income for the county was $17,121. About 13.2% of families and 20.5% of the population were below the poverty line, including 35.0% of those under age 18 and 6.6% of those age 65 or over.

=== 2000 census ===
As of the census of 2000, there were 7,582 people, 3,071 households, and 2,201 families living in the county. The population density was 27 people per square mile (10 people/km^{2}). There were 3,848 housing units at an average density of 14 per square mile (5.4/km^{2}). The racial makeup of the county was 98.91% White, 0.11% Black or African American, 0.30% Native American, 0.11% Asian, 0.01% Pacific Islander, 0.13% from other races, and 0.44% from two or more races. 0.55% of the population were Hispanic or Latino of any race.

There were 3,071 households, out of which 28.90% had children under the age of 18 living with them, 57.00% were married couples living together, 10.30% had a female householder with no husband present, and 28.30% were non-families. 24.90% of all households were made up of individuals, and 12.30% had someone living alone who was 65 years of age or older. The average household size was 2.46 and the average family size was 2.91.

In the county, the population was spread out, with 22.40% under the age of 18, 8.00% from 18 to 24, 25.90% from 25 to 44, 27.10% from 45 to 64, and 16.70% who were 65 years of age or older. The median age was 41 years. For every 100 females there were 99.70 males. For every 100 females age 18 and over, there were 98.30 males.

The median income for a household in the county was $21,578, and the median income for a family was $26,701. Males had a median income of $25,609 versus $14,304 for females. The per capita income for the county was $11,491. About 19.10% of families and 25.10% of the population were below the poverty line, including 29.40% of those under age 18 and 24.90% of those age 65 or over.

== Politics ==
Calhoun County is a historically secessionist and Democratic county, which never voted Republican between the first Reconstruction election and Dwight D. Eisenhower’s landslide win in 1956. Since then it has consistently followed the statewide results of West Virginia, from Democratic-leaning to Republican bastion in the twenty-first century.

United States presidential election results for Calhoun County, West Virginia
Year	Republican		Democratic		Third party(ies)	
Year	No.	%	No.	%	No.	%
1912	575	23.84%	1,349	55.93%	488	20.23%
1916	936	41.31%	1,317	58.12%	13	0.57%
1920	1,671	48.48%	1,773	51.44%	3	0.09%
1924	1,399	38.51%	2,231	61.41%	3	0.08%
1928	1,745	44.27%	2,179	55.28%	18	0.46%
1932	1,564	33.11%	3,139	66.45%	21	0.44%
1936	1,733	33.88%	3,369	65.87%	13	0.25%
1940	1,891	39.70%	2,872	60.30%	0	0.00%
1944	1,687	42.81%	2,254	57.19%	0	0.00%
1948	1,549	42.08%	2,126	57.76%	6	0.16%
1952	2,101	49.56%	2,138	50.44%	0	0.00%
1956	2,094	52.06%	1,928	47.94%	0	0.00%
1960	1,946	49.63%	1,975	50.37%	0	0.00%
1964	1,275	32.68%	2,626	67.32%	0	0.00%
1968	1,612	44.63%	1,682	46.57%	318	8.80%
1972	1,992	56.59%	1,528	43.41%	0	0.00%
1976	1,283	37.12%	2,173	62.88%	0	0.00%
1980	1,606	46.67%	1,717	49.90%	118	3.43%
1984	1,765	53.88%	1,473	44.96%	38	1.16%
1988	1,395	45.63%	1,644	53.78%	18	0.59%
1992	1,095	33.51%	1,627	49.79%	546	16.71%
1996	1,000	36.70%	1,402	51.45%	323	11.85%
2000	1,425	54.49%	1,112	42.52%	78	2.98%
2004	1,588	54.97%	1,266	43.82%	35	1.21%
2008	1,366	56.24%	993	40.88%	70	2.88%
2012	1,319	59.68%	818	37.01%	73	3.30%
2016	2,035	77.14%	456	17.29%	147	5.57%
2020	2,364	79.57%	568	19.12%	39	1.31%
2024	2,391	81.44%	488	16.62%	57	1.94%

== Attractions ==
Calhoun County is home to four public parks: The Upper West Fork Park in Chloe on West Virginia Route 16, the West Fork Park in Arnoldsburg on U.S. Route 33, Mt. Zion Park on West Virginia Route 16, and Calhoun County Park on West Virginia Route 16.

Calhoun is home to the annual West Virginia Wood Festival, the West Virginia Molasses Festival in September.

Calhoun County was home to one of the last 500 drive-in theaters in the nation, now closed. Calhoun also has one of the largest genealogy collections in the state, housed at Calhoun County Library. The library is also home to the "West Virginia Room" which includes books on West Virginia and by West Virginians.

== Communities ==
=== Town ===
- Grantsville (county seat)

=== Magisterial districts ===
- District 1
- District 2
- District 3
- District 4
- District 5

=== Unincorporated communities ===
- Adam
- Altizer
- Annamoriah
- Arnoldsburg
- Ayers
- Beech
- Big Springs
- Bigbend
- Chloe
- Cremo
- Dodrill
- Douglas
- Euclid
- Five Forks
- Freed
- Hathaway
- Hattie
- Henrietta
- Hur
- Joker
- Leatherbark
- Liberty Hill
- Millstone
- Milo
- Minnora
- Mount Zion
- Mudfork
- Nicut
- Nobe
- Oka
- Orma
- Pleasant Hill
- Purdy
- Richardson
- Russet
- Sand Ridge
- Stinson
- Sycamore
- White Pine

== See also ==
- Calhoun County Schools
- The Calhoun Chronicle and The Grantsville News
- National Register of Historic Places listings in Calhoun County, West Virginia
- Stumptown Wildlife Management Area
- USS Calhoun County (LST-519)
