= Grantsville, West Virginia =

- Town
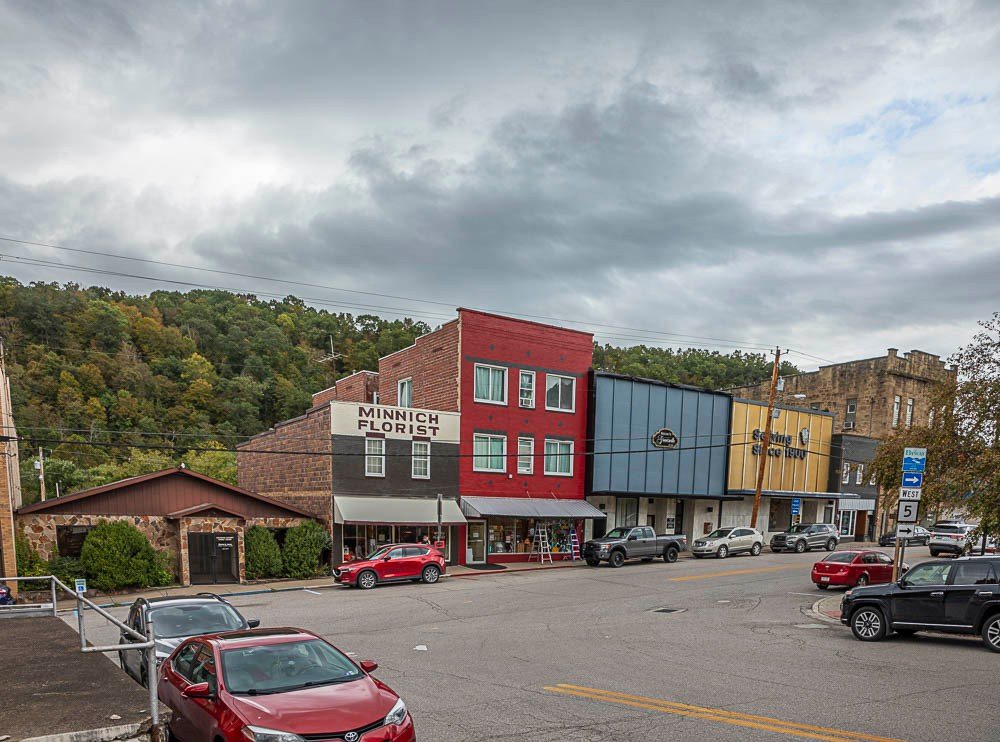
- Main Street in 2023
- Interactive map of Grantsville, West Virginia
- Location within West Virginia Location within the United States
- Coordinates: 38°55′23″N 81°5′42″W
- Country: United States
- State: West Virginia
- County: Calhoun

Area
  - Total: 0.46 sq mi (1.20 km^{2})
  - Land: 0.44 sq mi (1.13 km^{2})
  - Water: 0.027 sq mi (0.07 km^{2})
- Elevation: 712 ft (217 m)

Population (2020)
  - Total: 494
  - Estimate (2021): 476
  - Density: 1,178.9/sq mi (455.18/km^{2})
- Time zone: UTC-5 (Eastern (EST))
  - Summer (DST): UTC-4 (EDT)
- ZIP code: 26147
- Area code: 304
- FIPS code: 54-32884
- GNIS feature ID: 1539593
- Website: https://townofgrantsvillemunicipality.squarespace.com/

Grantsville is a town in Calhoun County, West Virginia, United States. The population was 482 at the 2020 census. It is the county seat of Calhoun County. The town was established along the Little Kanawha River in 1865 and named for Ulysses S. Grant. Grantsville is home to Wayne Underwood Park, which includes a .25-mile-long (0.40 km) walking trail, and to the annual West Virginia Wood Festival.

== Geography ==
According to the United States Census Bureau, the town has a total area of 0.47 square miles (1.22 km^{2}), of which 0.44 square miles (1.14 km^{2}) is land and 0.03 square miles (0.08 km^{2}) is water.

=== Climate ===
The climate in this area is characterized by hot, humid summers and generally mild to cool winters. According to the Köppen Climate Classification system, Grantsville has a humid subtropical climate, abbreviated "Cfa" on climate maps.

Climate data for Grantsville, West Virginia, 1991–2020 normals, extremes 1941–present
Month	Jan	Feb	Mar	Apr	May	Jun	Jul	Aug	Sep	Oct	Nov	Dec	Year
Record high °F (°C)	82 (28)	81 (27)	90 (32)	92 (33)	94 (34)	99 (37)	102 (39)	102 (39)	102 (39)	97 (36)	86 (30)	80 (27)	102 (39)
Mean maximum °F (°C)	66.3 (19.1)	68.0 (20.0)	78.1 (25.6)	86.1 (30.1)	89.0 (31.7)	92.0 (33.3)	93.2 (34.0)	92.7 (33.7)	91.2 (32.9)	85.0 (29.4)	77.7 (25.4)	67.5 (19.7)	94.5 (34.7)
Mean daily maximum °F (°C)	42.1 (5.6)	45.8 (7.7)	54.8 (12.7)	67.8 (19.9)	75.9 (24.4)	82.9 (28.3)	85.8 (29.9)	85.3 (29.6)	79.8 (26.6)	68.3 (20.2)	56.7 (13.7)	45.6 (7.6)	65.9 (18.8)
Daily mean °F (°C)	31.6 (−0.2)	34.4 (1.3)	41.8 (5.4)	53.1 (11.7)	62.7 (17.1)	70.7 (21.5)	74.4 (23.6)	73.5 (23.1)	67.0 (19.4)	55.0 (12.8)	43.9 (6.6)	35.5 (1.9)	53.6 (12.0)
Mean daily minimum °F (°C)	21.1 (−6.1)	22.9 (−5.1)	28.7 (−1.8)	38.4 (3.6)	49.4 (9.7)	58.5 (14.7)	63.1 (17.3)	61.6 (16.4)	54.2 (12.3)	41.6 (5.3)	31.1 (−0.5)	25.5 (−3.6)	41.3 (5.2)
Mean minimum °F (°C)	1.8 (−16.8)	5.3 (−14.8)	14.6 (−9.7)	25.4 (−3.7)	34.5 (1.4)	48.2 (9.0)	54.0 (12.2)	53.1 (11.7)	43.0 (6.1)	29.9 (−1.2)	18.0 (−7.8)	9.8 (−12.3)	−1.7 (−18.7)
Record low °F (°C)	−21 (−29)	−17 (−27)	−8 (−22)	17 (−8)	24 (−4)	33 (1)	37 (3)	31 (−1)	31 (−1)	10 (−12)	2 (−17)	−16 (−27)	−21 (−29)
Average precipitation inches (mm)	3.73 (95)	3.35 (85)	4.27 (108)	3.91 (99)	5.59 (142)	5.34 (136)	5.36 (136)	3.94 (100)	3.67 (93)	3.56 (90)	3.12 (79)	3.90 (99)	49.74 (1,262)
Source 1: NOAA
Source 2: National Weather Service

== Demographics ==
Historical population
Census	Pop.	Note	%±
1880	112		—
1900	225		—
1910	282		25.3%
1920	450		59.6%
1930	1,018		126.2%
1940	1,052		3.3%
1950	959		−8.8%
1960	866		−9.7%
1970	795		−8.2%
1980	788		−0.9%
1990	671		−14.8%
2000	565		−15.8%
2010	561		−0.7%
2020	494		−11.9%
2021 (est.)	476	▼	−3.6%
U.S. Decennial Census

=== 2010 census ===
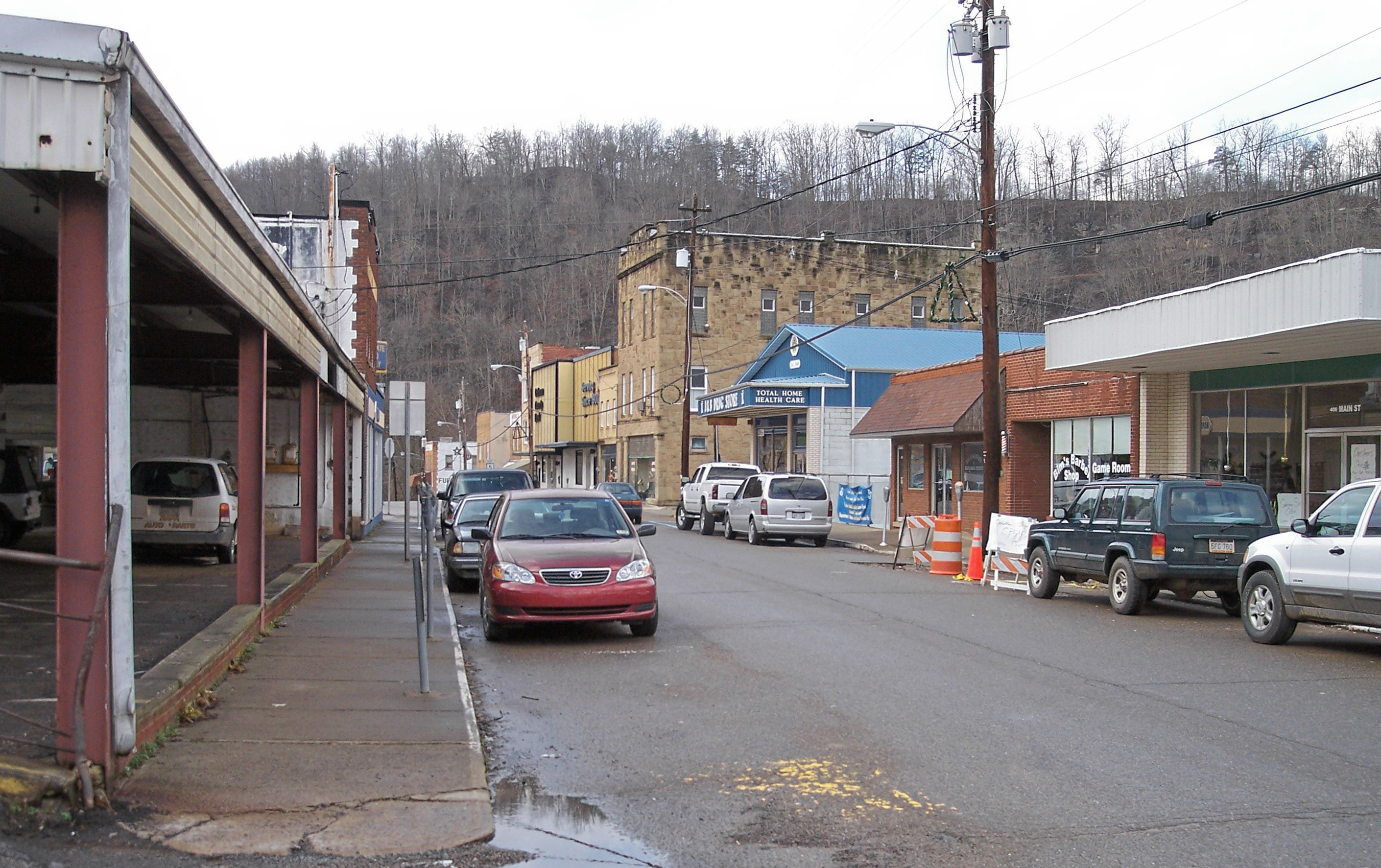
Main Street in Grantsville in 2006

As of the census of 2010, there were 561 people, 262 households, and 140 families living in the town. The population density was 1,275.0 inhabitants per square mile (492.3/km^{2}). There were 303 housing units at an average density of 688.6 per square mile (265.9/km^{2}). The racial makeup of the town was 98.9% White, 0.2% African American, 0.4% Native American, 0.4% Asian, and 0.2% from two or more races. Hispanic or Latino of any race were 0.2% of the population.

There were 262 households, of which 21.8% had children under the age of 18 living with them, 34.4% were married couples living together, 14.9% had a female householder with no husband present, 4.2% had a male householder with no wife present, and 46.6% were non-families. 40.8% of all households were made up of individuals, and 20.2% had someone living alone who was 65 years of age or older. The average household size was 2.06 and the average family size was 2.76.

The median age in the town was 47.1 years. 16.4% of residents were under the age of 18; 7.5% were between the ages of 18 and 24; 23.8% were from 25 to 44; 29.2% were from 45 to 64; and 23% were 65 years of age or older. The gender makeup of the town was 47.2% male and 52.8% female.

=== 2000 census ===
As of the census of 2000, there were 565 people, 232 households, and 142 families living in the town. The population density was 1,241.1 inhabitants per square mile (474.2/km^{2}). There were 276 housing units at an average density of 606.3 per square mile (231.7/km^{2}). The racial makeup of the town was 99.65% White, and 0.35% from two or more races. Hispanic or Latino of any race were 0.35% of the population.

There were 232 households, out of which 23.3% had children under the age of 18 living with them, 43.1% were married couples living together, 12.5% had a female householder with no husband present, and 38.4% were non-families. 34.9% of all households were made up of individuals, and 15.5% had someone living alone who was 65 years of age or older. The average household size was 2.33 and the average family size was 3.02.

In the town, the population was spread out, with 21.1% under the age of 18, 9.2% from 18 to 24, 20.9% from 25 to 44, 25.7% from 45 to 64, and 23.2% who were 65 years of age or older. The median age was 44 years. For every 100 females, there were 96.9 males. For every 100 females age 18 and over, there were 89.8 males.

The median income for a household in the town was $26,111, and the median income for a family was $34,286. Males had a median income of $31,250 versus $15,192 for females. The per capita income for the town was $13,501. About 19.3% of families and 20.5% of the population were below the poverty line, including 15.4% of those under age 18 and 11.8% of those age 65 or over.

== Notable people ==
- Hovah Hall Underwood, First Lady of West Virginia from 1957 to 1961 and 1997 to 2001
- Bernard P. Bell, winner of the Congressional Medal of Honor.
- Jedediah Purdy, philosopher, professor of law, Columbia University.

== See also ==
- The Calhoun Chronicle and The Grantsville News - a weekly newspaper serving Grantsville.
