= Spring Creek (Little Kanawha River tributary) =

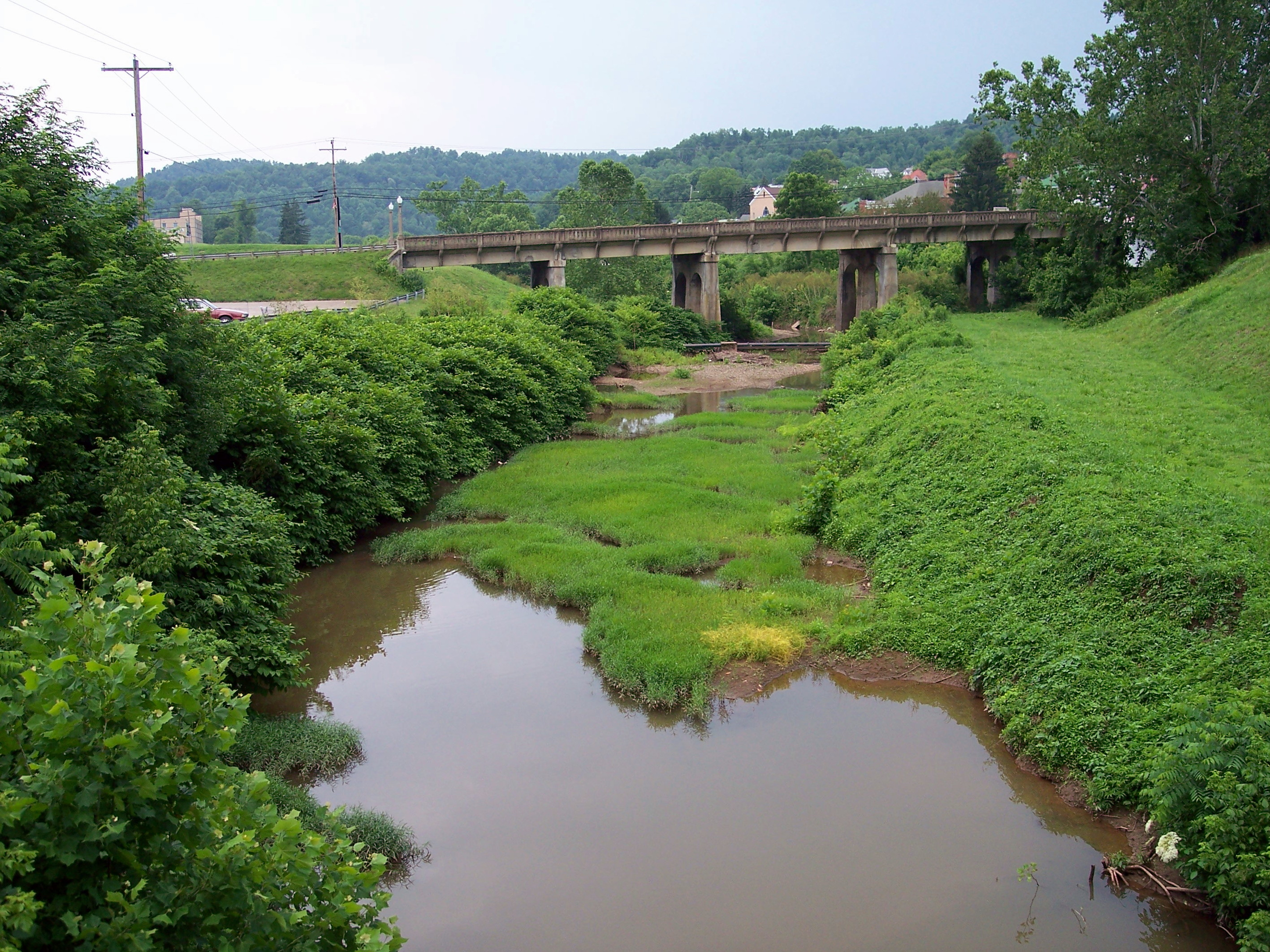
- Spring Creek in Spencer in 2006

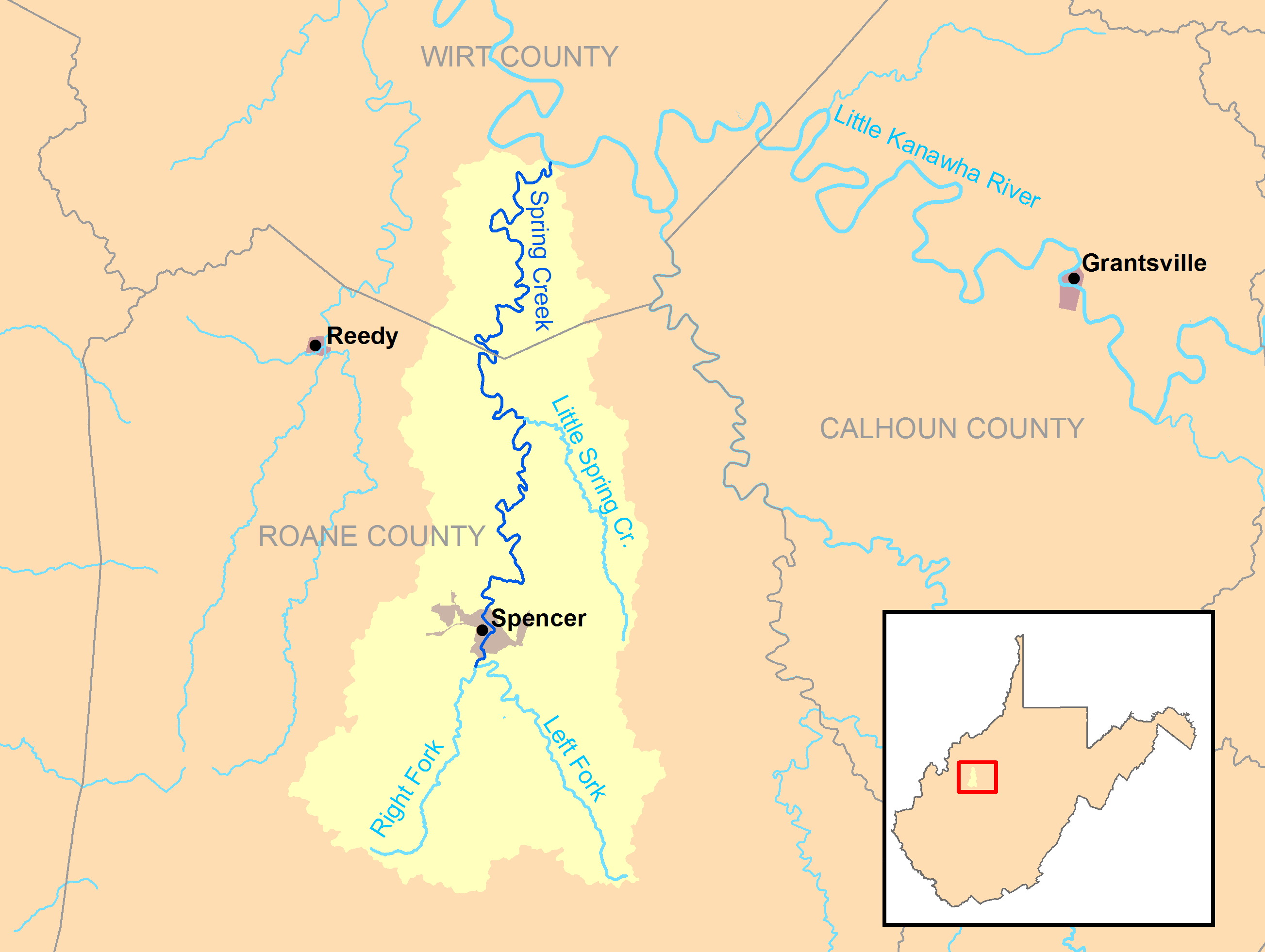
- Spring Creek and its watershed

Location
- Country: United States
- State: West Virginia
- Counties: Roane, Wirt

Physical characteristics
- Source: Left Fork Spring Creek
  - location: near Clover, southeast of Spencer, Roane County
  - coordinates: 38.7156466°N 81.2856741°W
  - length: 8 mi (13 km)
  - elevation: 1,033 ft (315 m)
- 2nd source: Right Fork Spring Creek
  - location: near Speed, south of Spencer, Roane County
  - coordinates: 38.728701°N 81.40401°W
  - length: 7.8 mi (12.6 km)
  - elevation: 1,041 ft (317 m)
- Source confluence
  - location: south of Spencer, Roane County
  - coordinates: 38.7892549°N 81.3556755°W
  - elevation: 724 ft (221 m)
- Mouth: Little Kanawha River
  - location: Sanoma, Wirt County
  - coordinates: 38.9636934°N 81.3234521°W
  - elevation: 620 ft (190 m)
- Length: 25.3 mi (40.7 km)
- Basin size: 89 sq mi (230 km^{2})

Basin features
- Tributaries
  - right: Little Spring Creek

Spring Creek is a tributary of the Little Kanawha River in western West Virginia in the United States. Via the Little Kanawha and Ohio rivers, it is part of the watershed of the Mississippi River, draining an area of 89 square miles (230 km^{2}) in a rural region on the unglaciated portion of the Allegheny Plateau. It is 25.3 miles (40.7 km) long, or 33.3 miles (53.6 km) long including its Left Fork.

Spring Creek is formed just south of the city of Spencer in northern Roane County by the confluence of the Left Fork Spring Creek, 8 miles (13 km) long, which rises near the community of Clover and flows northwestward, paralleled for most of its course by West Virginia Route 36; and the Right Fork Spring Creek, 7.8 miles (12.6 km) long, which rises near the community of Speed and flows northward, paralleled for most of its course by U.S. Route 119. From the confluence of its forks, Spring Creek flows northward through Spencer and northern Roane County into southeastern Wirt County, where it flows into the Little Kanawha River from the south at the community of Sanoma, approximately 8 miles (13 km) southeast of Elizabeth.

Little Spring Creek is a tributary of Spring Creek, 7 miles (11 km) long, in northeastern Roane County.

Charles Mill Lake, approximately 2 miles (3.2 km) southeast of Spencer, is formed by a dam on the Charles Fork, a tributary of the Left Fork Spring Creek. The lake was constructed in 1974 and is owned by the city of Spencer; it is operated as a recreation area for boating, fishing, hiking, biking, and camping.

According to the West Virginia Department of Environmental Protection, approximately 79.5% of the Spring Creek watershed is forested, mostly deciduous. Approximately 18.7% is used for pasture and agriculture.

== See also ==
- List of rivers of West Virginia
