= Walbach =

Walbach may refer to:

- John de Barth Walbach (1766-1857), an Alsatian baron
- Walbach, Haut-Rhin, a commune in the Haut-Rhin department in north-eastern France
- Château de Walbach, in the Haut-Rhin department in north-eastern France
- Walbach (Agger), a river of North Rhine-Westphalia, Germany, tributary of the Agger
- Camp Walbach, Northwest of Cheyenne, Wyoming, USA, established 1858, abandoned 1859

== See also ==
- Wallbach (disambiguation)
- Wahlbach (disambiguation)
