= National Register of Historic Places listings in Roane County, West Virginia =

Location of Roane County in West Virginia

This is a list of the National Register of Historic Places listings in Roane County, West Virginia.

This is intended to be a complete list of the properties and districts on the National Register of Historic Places in Roane County, West Virginia, United States. The locations of National Register properties and districts for which the latitude and longitude coordinates are included below, may be seen in an online map.

There are 7 properties listed on the National Register in the county.

This National Park Service list is complete through NPS recent listings posted September 12, 2025.

Contents: Counties in West Virginia

Barbour - Berkeley - Boone - Braxton - Brooke - Cabell - Calhoun - Clay - Doddridge - Fayette - Gilmer - Grant - Greenbrier - Hampshire - Hancock - Hardy - Harrison - Jackson - Jefferson - Kanawha - Lewis - Lincoln - Logan - Marion - Marshall - Mason - McDowell - Mercer - Mineral - Mingo - Monongalia - Monroe - Morgan - Nicholas - Ohio - Pendleton - Pleasants - Pocahontas - Preston - Putnam - Raleigh - Randolph - Ritchie - Roane - Summers - Taylor - Tucker - Tyler - Upshur - Wayne - Webster - Wetzel - Wirt - Wood - Wyoming

== Current listings ==
	Name on the Register	Image	Date listed	Location	City or town	Description
1	Chrystal Water and Power Company-Spencer Water and Ice Company	Chrystal Water and Power Company-Spencer Water and Ice Company	March 27, 2007 (#07000238)	Church St. 38°47′55″N 81°21′08″W	Spencer	
2	Albert S. Heck Mansion	Albert S. Heck Mansion	March 5, 1999 (#99000289)	WV 14; 38°48′55″N 81°22′09″W	Spencer	
3	Laurel Hill District School		September 19, 2019 (#100004284)	U.S. Route 33 West and County Route 5/9; 38°48′12″N 81°21′15″W	Spencer	
4	Honorable Joseph Marcellus McWhorter House		March 9, 2020 (#100003669)	412 Church St. 38°48′02″N 81°21′03″W	Spencer	
5	Robey Theatre	Robey Theatre	March 29, 1989 (#89000182)	318 Main St. 38°48′08″N 81°21′05″W	Spencer	
6	Spencer Commercial Historic District		September 18, 2025 (#100012206)	Main Street, Market Street, Court Street, Church Street, Beauty Street, Heritage Avenue; 38°48′07″N 81°21′04″W	Spencer	
7	Spencer Presbyterian Church	Spencer Presbyterian Church	May 31, 2016 (#16000315)	408 Market St. 38°48′02″N 81°21′08″W	Spencer	

== See also ==
- List of National Historic Landmarks in West Virginia
- National Register of Historic Places listings in West Virginia
