= Jean Joseph de Barth =

French politician (1726–1793)

- Born: 1726; Haguenau, Alsace, France
- Died: 24 September 1793; Philadelphia, Pennsylvania, U.S.
- Spouse: Marie Therese de Rohmer
- Children: Françoise de Barth, François Joseph Meinard de Barth de Bourogne; Marie-Antoinette (Mother Edmond-Paul) de Barth; Rev. Adolphus Louis de Barth; John Baptiste de Barth Walbach; Suzanne de Barth; Françoise de Barth (wife of Capt. Claude Joseph Guy Edouard Blondeau)

Count Jean-Joseph de Barth (1726–1793) was an Alsatian member of the French National Assembly, counselor to Louis XVI, and préteur royal and bailiff of Munster, who led the "French 500" fleeing the French Revolution to America's Ohio Valley, where they founded Gallipolis on the Ohio River in 1790.

De Barth was aided by Thomas Jefferson, George Washington, and Alexander Hamilton, the first two hoping to sell their Ohio Valley lands to the Frenchman. De Barth showed his appreciation with gifts to Jefferson from France and the American frontier, including a French art book, buffalo skin, and rather mysterious "tooth of a carnivorous elephant."

De Barth and his followers were aristocrats and city merchants, not pioneer material, and struggled with land speculators, Indians, and the wilderness. The aging de Barth soon moved on, purchasing a manor at Springettsbury in Philadelphia. This unfortunately turned out to be an even more dangerous move; shortly thereafter he succumbed to the 1793 Philadelphia yellow fever epidemic, and his home became a hospital for the treatment of victims of yellow fever. (Note: the records conflict on the manor location within the Springettsbury estate, one specifying the Bush Hill estate, while others contradict that.)

Jean Joseph de Barth was buried at St. Mary's Roman Catholic Church (Philadelphia).

The count's lands included 10,000 acres on the Elk River in what is now West Virginia. This land passed to his son, General John Baptiste de Barth Walbach, for whom the town of Wallback, West Virginia and the Wallback Wildlife Management Area are named. Walbach, the oldest officer to ever serve in the U.S. Army, had in his long career commanded most American eastern seacoast forts and became adjutant general of the United States.

Another of de Barth's sons, Rev. Adolphus Louis de Barth, was vicar general and administrator of the diocese of Philadelphia, and established several early frontier Catholic churches. A daughter, Marie-Antoinette de Barth, became Mother Edmond-Paul, Abbotess of the Cistercian nuns of Notre-Dame-de-la-Misericorde at Koenigsbruck Abbey in the Forest of Haguenau.

In 1795, the Alsatian home that the de Barth family fled to escape the guillotine was purchased by industrialist Andre Hartmann, and later was the beginning of the beautiful Albert Schweitzer Park.
