= Left Hand, West Virginia =

Left Hand
- Unincorporated community
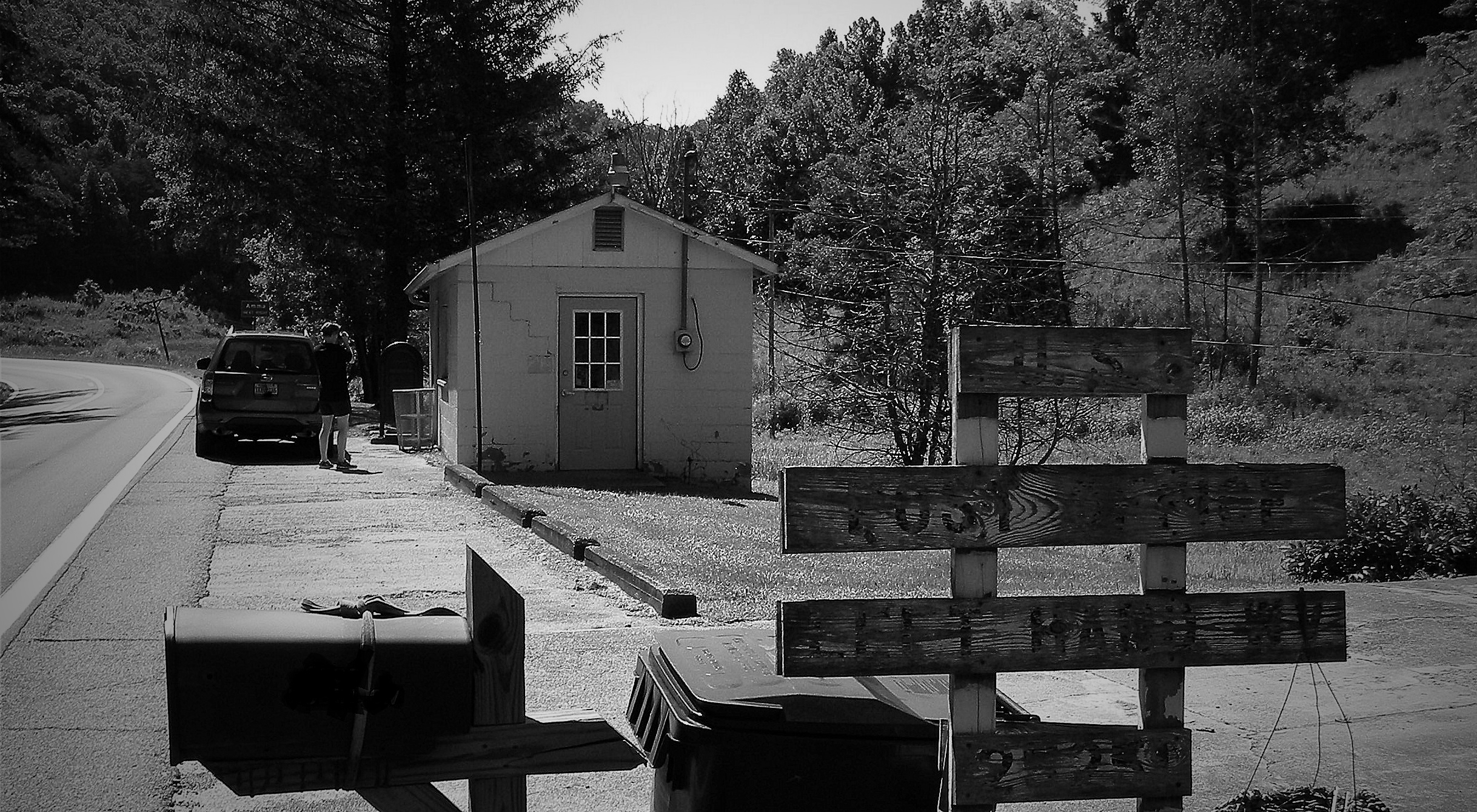
- Left Hand WV Post Office

- Location within the state of West Virginia Left Hand (the United States)
- Coordinates: 38°37′7″N 81°14′42″W
- Country: United States
- State: West Virginia
- County: Roane
- Elevation: 728 ft (222 m)

Population (2009)
  - Total: 390
- Time zone: UTC-5 (Eastern (EST))
  - Summer (DST): UTC-4 (EDT)
- ZIP codes: 25251
- GNIS feature ID: 1541751

Left Hand (also Justices, Knights, or Lefthand) is an unincorporated community in southeastern Roane County, West Virginia, United States. It lies along West Virginia Route 36 southeast of the city of Spencer, the county seat of Roane County. Its post office is still active. The tourist attraction of the Natural Bridge can be located via GPS, at 209 Natural Bridge Rd, 25251.

The community was named after nearby Lefthand Run creek.

== Education ==
An elementary school "Geary Elementary/Middle School" is located in Left Hand, West Virginia.

== Gallery ==
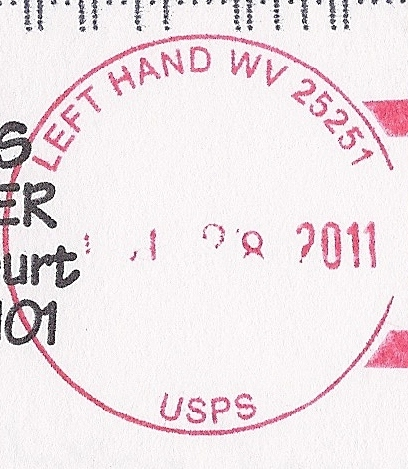
Left Hand postmark
