= Uler, West Virginia =

- Unincorporated community
- Location within West Virginia Location within the United States
- Coordinates: 38°37′04″N 81°08′35″W
- Country: United States
- State: West Virginia
- County: Roane
- Elevation: 761 ft (232 m)
- Time zone: UTC-5 (Eastern (EST))
  - Summer (DST): UTC-4 (EDT)
- Area codes: 304 & 681
- GNIS feature ID: 1549962

Uler is an unincorporated community in Roane County, West Virginia, United States. Uler is 17 miles (27 km) southeast of Spencer.

The original application for the post office contained the suggestion Eulah, but a postal error accounts for the error in spelling, which was never corrected.
