= Clover, Roane County, West Virginia =

Unincorporated community in West Virginia, United States

Clover, West Virginia
- Unincorporated community
- Location within West Virginia Location within the United States
- Coordinates: 38°43′23″N 81°17′22″W
- Country: United States
- State: West Virginia
- County: Roane
- Elevation: 1,109 ft (338 m)
- Time zone: UTC-5 (Eastern (EST))
  - Summer (DST): UTC-4 (EDT)
- Area codes: 304 & 681
- GNIS feature ID: 1554159

Clover is an unincorporated community in Roane County, West Virginia, United States. Clover is located on West Virginia Route 36, 6.5 miles (10.5 km) southeast of Spencer.

The community took its name from nearby Clover Creek.
