= WVRC =

WVRC may refer to:

- WVRC (AM), a radio station (1400 AM) licensed to Spencer, West Virginia, United States
- WVRC-FM, a radio station (104.7 FM) licensed to Spencer, West Virginia, United States
- Wabash Valley Railroad (reporting mark WVRC)
- West Virginia Radio Corporation
