= Newton, West Virginia =

- Unincorporated community
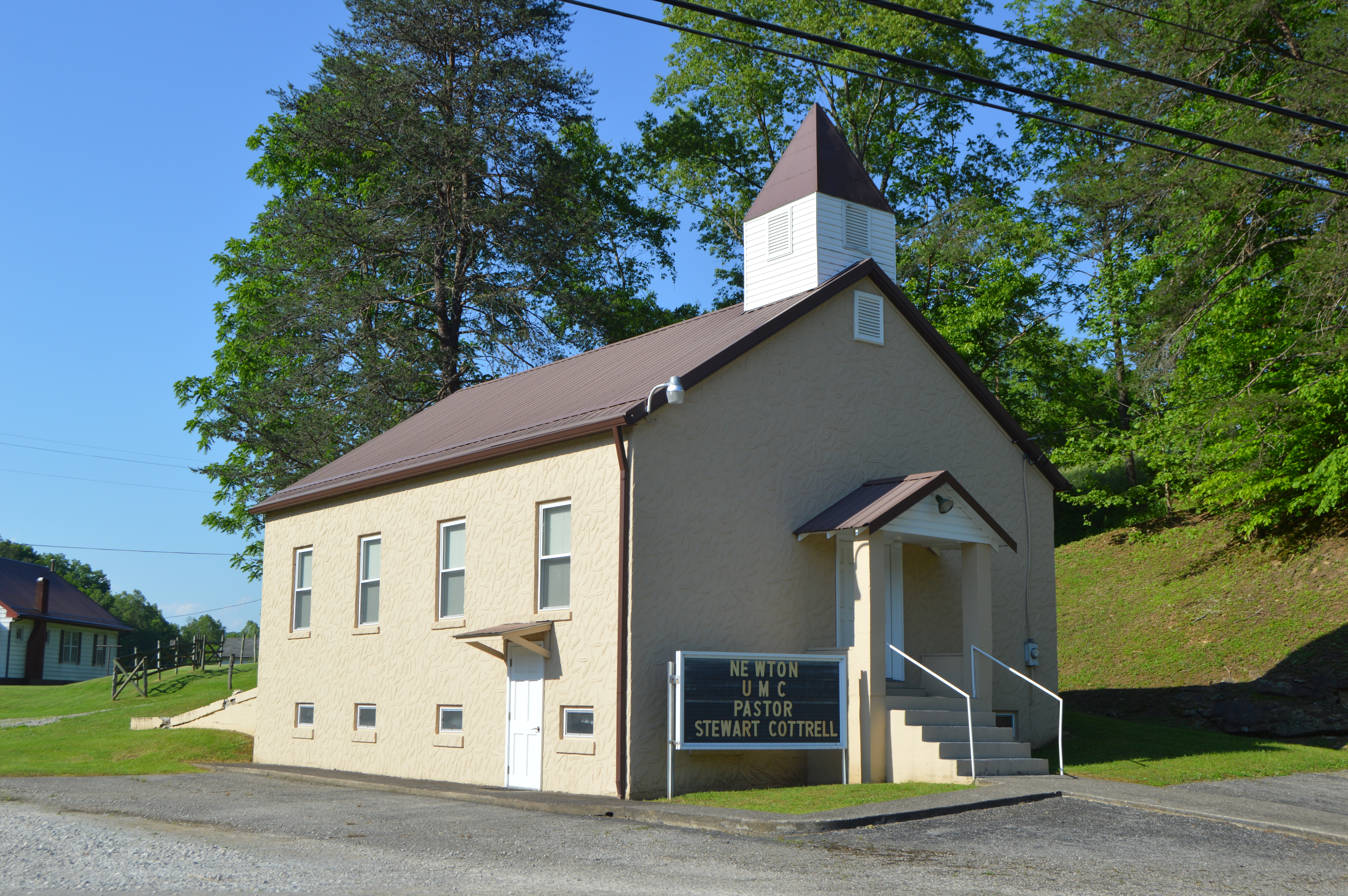
- Methodist church

- Location within West Virginia
- Coordinates: 38°35′29″N 81°10′43″W
- Country: United States
- State: West Virginia
- County: Roane
- Elevation: 718 ft (219 m)
- Time zone: UTC-5 (Eastern (EST))
  - Summer (DST): UTC-4 (EDT)
- ZIP code: 25266
- Area codes: 304 & 681
- GNIS feature ID: 1544162

Newton is an unincorporated community in Roane County, West Virginia, United States. Newton is located on West Virginia Route 36, 11.5 miles (18.5 km) northeast of Clendenin. Newton has a post office with ZIP code 25266.

The community was named after Isaac Newton Ross, son of an early postmaster.

== Notable people ==
- Squire Parsons (who was born there)
