= Countsville, West Virginia =

Unincorporated community in West Virginia, US

Coordinates: 38°41′36″N 81°26′26″W

Countsville is an unincorporated community in Roane County, in the U.S. state of West Virginia.

== History ==
A post office called Countsville was established in 1882, and remained in operation until 1953. The community was named after S. B. Counts, who was instrumental in securing the post office for the town.
