= Buffalo Lick, West Virginia =

Unincorporated community in West Virginia, United States

Buffalo Lick
- Unincorporated community
- Location within the state of West Virginia Buffalo Lick (the United States)
- Coordinates: 38°42′15″N 81°20′50″W
- Country: United States
- State: West Virginia
- County: Roane
- Elevation: 856 ft (261 m)
- Time zone: UTC-5 (Eastern (EST))
  - Summer (DST): UTC-4 (EDT)
- GNIS ID: 1740861

Buffalo Lick was an unincorporated community located in Roane County, West Virginia, United States.
