= Gandeeville, West Virginia =

Unincorporated community in West Virginia, United States

- Unincorporated community
- Location within West Virginia Location within the United States
- Coordinates: 38°42′18″N 81°24′37″W
- Country: United States
- State: West Virginia
- County: Roane
- Elevation: 810 ft (250 m)
- Time zone: UTC-5 (Eastern (EST))
  - Summer (DST): UTC-4 (EDT)
- ZIP code: 25243
- Area codes: 304 & 681
- GNIS feature ID: 1539324

Gandeeville is an unincorporated community in Roane County, West Virginia, United States. Gandeeville is located on U.S. Route 119, 7.5 miles (12.1 km) south-southwest of Spencer. Gandeeville has a post office with ZIP code 25243.

The community derives its name from Uriah Gandee, a pioneer settler.
