= Leaning Oak, West Virginia =

Leaning Oak
- Unincorporated community
- Location within the state of West Virginia Leaning Oak (the United States)
- Coordinates: 38°46′25″N 81°22′44″W
- Country: United States
- State: West Virginia
- County: Roane
- Elevation: 748 ft (228 m)
- Time zone: UTC-5 (Eastern (EST))
  - Summer (DST): UTC-4 (EDT)
- GNIS ID: 1740929

Leaning Oak is an unincorporated community in Roane County, West Virginia, United States.
