= Patsey, West Virginia =

Patsey
- Unincorporated community
- Location within the state of West Virginia Patsey (the United States)
- Coordinates: 38°40′38″N 81°25′22″W
- Country: United States
- State: West Virginia
- County: Roane
- Elevation: 794 ft (242 m)
- Time zone: UTC-5 (Eastern (EST))
  - Summer (DST): UTC-4 (EDT)
- GNIS ID: 1740967

Patsey was an unincorporated community in Roane County, West Virginia, United States.
