= Roane County Schools =

Roane County Schools may refer to:

- Roane County Schools (Tennessee), a school district in Roane County, Tennessee
- Roane County Schools (West Virginia), a school district in Roane County, West Virginia
