= John de Barth Walbach =

United States Army general

John Baptiste de Barth Walbach
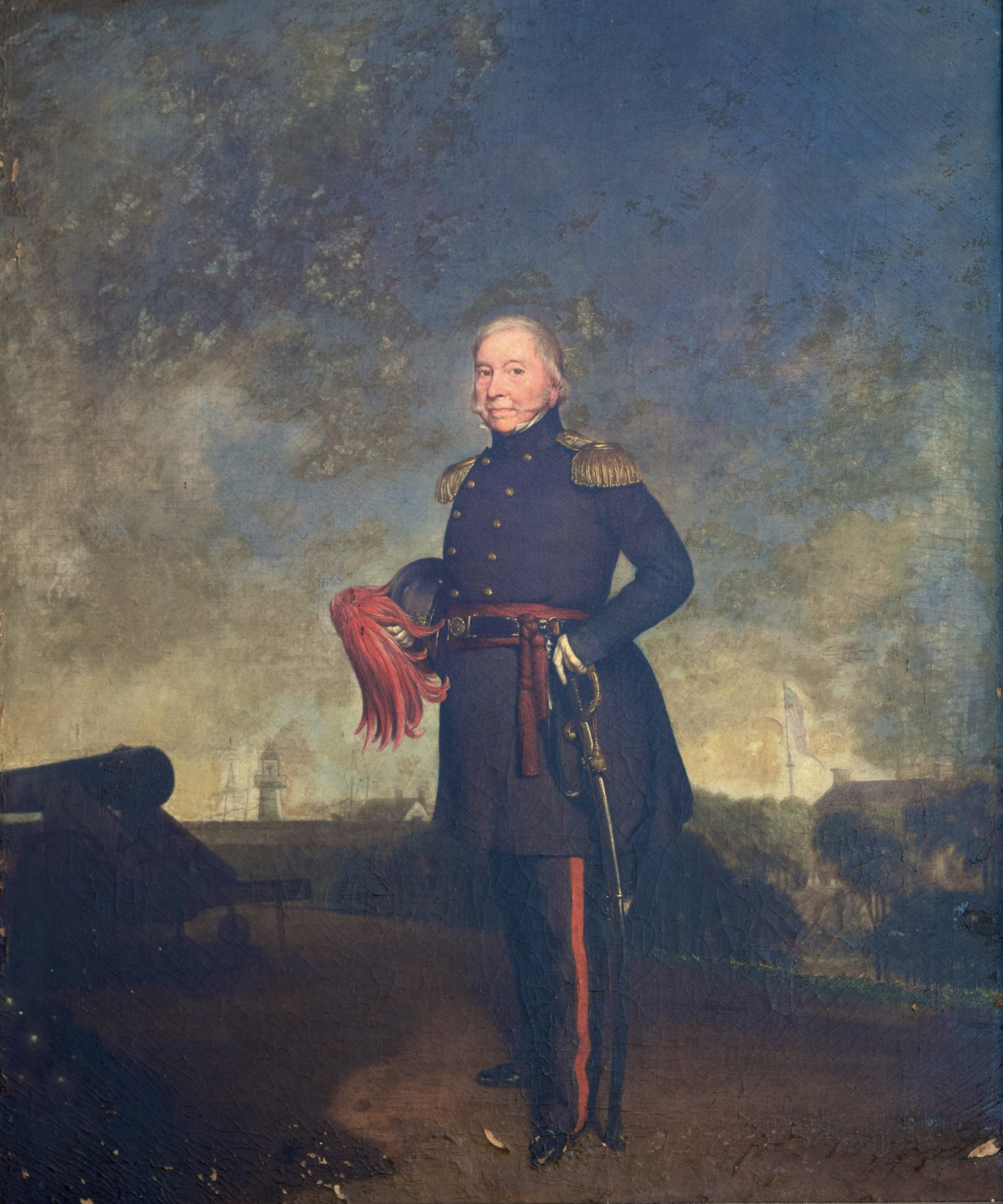
- Gen. John de Barth Walbach, Ft Monroe, Old Point Comfort, Virginia, 1846
- Born: October 3, 1766; Munster, Haut-Rhin, Alsace, France
- Died: June 10, 1857 (aged 90); Baltimore, Maryland, U.S.
- Spouse: Mary Louise Harberger
- Children: Therese de Barth Walbach, Louisa de Barth Walbach, Capt. Louis Augustus de Barth Walbach, Marie Adelphine Theresa de Barth Walbach, Lieut. John J. de Barth Walbach

John Baptiste de Barth Walbach (October 3, 1766 – June 10, 1857) was an Alsatian baron who fought in the French Revolutionary Wars, and was one of the few foreign-born senior officers in the United States Army prior to the American Civil War, attaining the rank of brevet brigadier general.

After immigrating to the United States to join his father, Walbach became an aide to Alexander Hamilton, rising to Adjutant General of the United States during the War of 1812. With a military career spanning over 57 years, he remained in active duty until his death at the age of 90, making him the oldest acting officer in U.S. history. During his long career he commanded most forts along the eastern seaboard: Fort Constitution, Fort Trumbull, Fort Severn, Fort Monroe, Frankford Arsenal, Fort McHenry, and Fort Pickens. Many American place names are in his honor, including Fort Walbach.

== Biography ==
=== Early years in Europe and West Indies ===
John de Barth Walbach was born on October 3, 1766, in Munster, Haut-Rhin, Alsace, France, and was the third son of French nobleman Count Jean Joseph de Barth and Marie Therese de Rohmer. Walbach's full name was Antoine Jean Baptiste de Barth, Baron de Walbach, but he Anglicized it after emigrating to the United States in 1798. Although born in France, Walbach's main biographies were written during the late 19th century while Alsace was temporarily part of Germany, so most references refer to him as German. His extant correspondence is in French and English, and his father was described by Thomas Jefferson, George Washington, and others as a Frenchman.

Walbach received his military education from the military academy of Strasbourg, Alsace, France, and was commissioned as an ensign in the Royal Alsace Regiment in 1782. He then served as 2nd, then 1st lieutenant in the Lauzun hussars in the French Royal Army from 1784 to 1789.

In 1790, Walbach's aging aristocrat father led a group called the "French 500" to America to escape the French Revolution, creating a new settlement called Gallipolis in what is now Ohio. Walbach remained behind to fight for the French monarchy in the French Revolutionary Wars with several forces in the Armée des Émigrés, including the army of the Comte d'Artois (later King Charles X of France), the Austrian Chasseurs of Condé, and Rohan's Hussars.

Rohan's Hussars, with Walbach as 3rd officer, were sent in 1795 to the French colony of Saint-Domingue (now Haiti) by England to defend British and royalist French planters against the slave revolt and to take the colony from France. By 1798, only 130 of the 1200 men in the regiment had survived the yellow fever that was wiping out the colonists.

=== Early United States military career ===
In 1798 he obtained a six months' leave of absence, with a view of visiting his father, who had come to the United States at the opening of the French Revolution. But the father had died in Philadelphia, and his estate had been sold by the sheriff. Walbach resigned his commission in the Hussars de Rohan in April 1798, and was appointed aide-de-camp to Brigadier General William MacPherson.

The United States Army was greatly expanded during the Quasi War with France and Walbach was commissioned a 2nd lieutenant of the U. S. Regiment of Light Dragoons and appointed as regimental adjutant on January 8, 1799. He was aide-de-camp to Major General Alexander Hamilton in May, assistant adjutant-general to Brigadier General William North in September, and in December was assigned to the staff of Major General Charles C. Pinckney, whom he assisted in preparing regulations for the cavalry. He was honorably discharged, along with most other officers who had served during the Quasi War, on June 15, 1800.

In February 1801, he was commissioned a first lieutenant in the Regiment of Artillerists and Engineers, and, on October 25 of the same year, he was appointed aide-de-camp to Brigadier General James Wilkinson, then the commanding general of the Army.

Walbach was retained in the Army in April 1802 as first lieutenant of artillery, and became regimental adjutant on December 1, 1804. He was a first lieutenant at Fort Jay, New York as of January 1, 1805. He was promoted to captain January 31, 1806 and assumed command of a company in the Regiment of Artillerists, from which is descended the modern day 1st Battalion, 1st Air Defense Artillery Regiment.

Walbach was in command at Fort Constitution near Portsmouth, New Hampshire when, on July 4, 1809, there was an explosion of over 100 pounds of gunpowder resulting in the loss of seven lives. In reaction to the explosion Walbach said, "I have faced death in its most dreadful form -- I have witnessed the desolations of war, and have mingled in all the hazards and havoc of battles, but never before did I feel a pang so terrible and intolerable as this." While at Fort Constitution, Walbach designed a two story 60 by 20 foot barracks for the soldiers at the fort. The foundations of the barracks are still visible.

He was appointed assistant deputy quartermaster general in March 1812, assistant adjutant general, with the rank of major, in June 1813, and on August 6, 1813 adjutant general of the Army with the rank of colonel. Walbach served as aide de camp to Major General Wade Hampton from about June 1812 until August 1813, when he (Walbach) became adjutant general of the U.S. Army.

He took part in the Battle of Crysler's Farm, Canada, 11 November 1813. Major General George W. Cullum, in his Campaigns and Engineers of the War of 1812-1815 says that the enemy, "discovering our disorder and slackened fire, pushed vigorously forward and endeavored by a flank movement to capture our cannon, when Adjutant-General Walbach, a German veteran in our army who had seen much foreign service, gave the order to 'charge mit de dragoons,' and thus saved the pieces." Walbach received a brevet (honorary promotion) to major for his performance in this battle.

In 1814, Walbach, was again in command at Fort Constitution and oversaw construction of a Martello Tower to cover the land approaches to the fort. This structure, commonly called the Walbach Tower, was allowed to deteriorate over years of disuse and neglect but its ruins can still be seen.

On 1 May 1815, he was breveted as a lieutenant colonel "for meritorious service."

=== Later career and death ===
He spent much of his later career in command of coastal fortifications including Fort Constitution near Portsmouth, New Hampshire (before 1809 to July 1821), Fort Trumbull in New London, Connecticut (December 1823 to as of February 1827), Fort Severn in Annapolis, Maryland (as of January 1, 1828 to as of October 1828), Commandant, Artillery School of Practice at Fort Monroe, Virginia (as of January 1, 1830), Frankford Arsenal in Pennsylvania (as of January 1, 1831 to as of January 1, 1832) and Fort McHenry in Baltimore, Maryland (November 1832 to March 1834), Fort Severn (June 1834 to December 1839), Fort Monroe (December 1839 to September 1848), Fort Pickens (November 1848 to April 1849) and Fort McHenry (October 1, 1853 to June 10, 1857). (Source - Official Army Registers 1825 to 1840. Returns of Army Posts.)

He was promoted to colonel and placed in command of the 4th Artillery Regiment on March 15, 1842. He took command of the regiment at Fort Monroe and was also the commander of Fort Monroe by right of being the senior officer present. In May 1850 he received a brevet promotion to brigadier general retroactive to 1823. Walbach and the regimental headquarters moved on Fort McHenry on October 1, 1853. He remained as colonel of the 4th Artillery until he died in 1857. Walbach did not serve in Mexico during the Mexican War due to his age at the time (80 years).

Walbach possessed mental and physical vigor until an advanced age. As there was no mandatory retirement age prior to the Civil War, he remained on active duty until he died, at the age of 90, in Baltimore, Maryland on June 10, 1857. The official announcement of General Walbach's death contained this eulogy - His long life and military career were characterized by some of the best traits of a gentleman and as soldier - unwavering integrity, truth and honor, strict attention to duty and zeal for service; and he tempered the administration of an exact discipline by the most elevated courtesies.

Walbach was buried in the New Cathedral Cemetery in Baltimore. His wife and his son Louis are buried near him.

== Family ==
Walbach married Mary Louise Harberger in Philadelphia in 1802. His children included:

John de Barth Walbach (1811-1892), who was appointed a midshipman in the United States Navy in 1827, and resigned as a lieutenant in 1861 to join the Confederacy. He served as a first lieutenant in the 10th Battalion of Virginia Artillery which was part of the Stonewall Brigade.

Louis Augustus de Barth Walbach, who was graduated at West Point Military Academy in 1834, and died a captain of ordnance, 26 June 1853.

His daughter, Adelphine de Barth Walbach, born in 1815, married in 1841 Thomas Elzear Gardiner, a prominent Maryland tobacco planter. Their son John de Barth Walbach Gardiner was military critic for the New York Times and author of the book German Plans for the Next World War. Another son, James de Barth Walbach (who dropped the "Gardiner" from his name), was a member of the Maryland House of Delegates representing Charles County from 1898 to 1906.

Walbach's brother was the Reverend Louis de Barth who was a Roman Catholic priest who oversaw parishes at Lancaster and Conewago. He was born at Munster, November 1, 1764. When the See of Philadelphia became vacant by the death of Bishop Egan, Father de Barth became administrator of the diocese. He died October 13, 1838.

A great great grandson of General Walbach was James de Barth Walbach. He was born in Maryland on August 20, 1893 and entered West Point in 1912 and graduated in 1916. He received the Legion of Merit during World War II, retired from the Army as a colonel in the Coast Artillery Corps in July 1947.

== Legacy ==
General Walbach holds the record for being the oldest officer to serve on active duty in the history of the United States Army, as well as the oldest person to serve on active duty in the United States Armed Forces, being 90 years old at the time of his death. His 58 year career was third only in length to that of Generals of the Army Douglas MacArthur (64 years) and Omar Bradley (69 years). (Generals MacArthur and Bradley were allowed to remain on active duty for life following their promotions to General of the Army. They effectively retired (i.e. having no active assignment) after 51 and 42 years of service respectively.)

Several streets near Army installations he commanded are named after him, including Walbach Street near Fort Trumbull in New London, Connecticut; Walbach Street near Fort Constitution in New Castle, New Hampshire; and Walbach Street near Frankford Arsenal in Philadelphia, Pennsylvania. The latter is jointly named for his son, Louis Augustus de Barth Walbach, who also served as arsenal commander.

The Walbach Tower near Fort Constitution was built under his supervision and is named for him. Ruins of the tower still remain.

Fort Walbach (a.k.a. Camp Walbach) is located on Lodge Pole Creek, approximately 25 miles northwest of Cheyenne, Wyoming, and was established on September 20, 1858 and named in honor of General Walbach. As this post was temporary, it was abandoned on April 19, 1859. The site of Fort Walbach was marked by the Wyoming Society of the Daughters of the American Revolution in 1914.

Battery Walbach at Fort Wetherill in Jamestown, Rhode Island was also named after him when it was constructed in the early 20th century.

The town of Wallback, West Virginia and the nearby Wallback Wildlife Management Area are named for him. Walbach had inherited extensive lands from his father, Jean Joseph de Barth, including 10,000 acres on the Elk River.

== Dates of rank ==
=== French Army ===
- Ensign, Regiment of Royal Alsace - 1 December 1782
- 2nd Lieutenant, Lauzun Hussars - 17 January 1784
- 1st Lieutenant, Lauzun Hussars - 27 May 1789
- Captain, Rohan's Hussars - 21 October 1790
- Major, Rohan's Hussars - 25 November 1795

=== United States Army ===
- 2nd Lieutenant, Light Dragoons – 8 January 1799
- Discharged - 15 June 1800
- Lieutenant, 2nd Regiment of Artillerists and Engineers - 16 February 1801
- Captain, Artillerists - 31 January 1806
- Major and Assistant Adjutant General - 27 June 1813
- Colonel and Adjutant General - 6 August 1813
- Brevet Major "for gallant conduct in the Battle of Chrystler's Field, Upper Canada" - 11 November 1813
- Brevet Lieutenant Colonel "for meritorious service" - 1 May 1815
- Relieved as Adjutant General and retained as Captain, Corps of Artillery - 15 June 1815
- Major, Corps of Artillery - 25 April 1818
- Brevet Colonel "for ten years faithful service in one grade" - 1 May 1825
- Lieutenant Colonel, 1st Artillery - 30 May 1832
- Colonel, 4th Artillery - 19 March 1842
- Brevet Brigadier General "for meritorious service" - May 1850 (to date from 11 November 1823)
