= Osbornes Mills =

Osbornes Mills may refer to:

- Osbornes Mills, New Jersey
- Osbornes Mills, West Virginia
