= Ruby Bradley =

American Army officer (1907–2002)

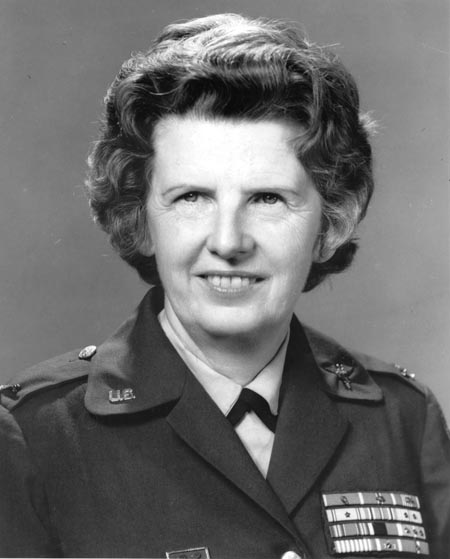
- Bradley as the Director, Nursing Activities, Brooke Army Medical Center
- Born: December 19, 1907; Spencer, West Virginia, United States
- Died: May 28, 2002 (aged 94); Hazard, Kentucky, United States
- Burial place: Arlington National Cemetery
- Military career
- Allegiance: United States
- Branch: United States Army
- Service years: 1934–1963
- Rank: Colonel
- Unit: Nurse Corps
- Conflicts: World War II; Korean War
- Awards: Legion of Merit (2); Bronze Star Medal (2); Army Commendation Medal (2); Florence Nightingale Medal

Colonel Ruby Bradley (December 19, 1907 – May 28, 2002) was a United States Army Nurse Corps officer, a prisoner of the Japanese in World War II, and one of the most decorated women in the United States military. She was a native of Spencer, West Virginia, but lived in Falls Church, Virginia, for over 50 years.

== Military career ==
Bradley entered the United States Army Nurse Corps as a surgical nurse in 1934. She was serving at Camp John Hay in the Philippines when she was captured by the Japanese army three weeks after the attack on Pearl Harbor on December 7, 1941.

In 1943, Bradley was moved to the Santo Tomas Internment Camp in Manila. It was there that she and several other imprisoned nurses earned the title "Angels in Fatigues" from fellow captives. For the next several months, she provided medical help to the prisoners and sought to feed starving children by shoving food into her pockets whenever she could, often going hungry herself. As she lost weight, she used the room in her uniform for smuggling surgical equipment into the prisoner-of-war camp. At the camp she assisted in 230 operations and helped to deliver 13 children.

When United States troops captured the camp on February 3, 1945, Bradley weighed only 86 pounds (39 kg). She was then returned to the United States where she continued her career in the army. She received a Bachelor of Science degree from the University of California in 1949.

Bradley served in the Korean War as Chief Nurse for the 171st Evacuation Hospital. In November 1950, during the Chinese counter-offensive, she refused to leave until she had loaded the sick and wounded onto a plane in Pyongyang while surrounded by 100,000 advancing Chinese soldiers. She was able to jump aboard the plane just as her ambulance exploded from an enemy shell. In 1951, she was named Chief Nurse for the Eighth Army, where she supervised over 500 Army nurses throughout Korea.

Bradley was promoted to the rank of colonel in 1958 and retired from the army in 1963.

== Later life and death ==
After her retirement in 1963, she continued to work for 17 years as a civilian nurse supervisor in Roane County, West Virginia. where she also bought a ranch near her family.

Bradley was the subject of a February 23, 2000 NBC Nightly News report by Tom Brokaw about the forgotten heroes of the military.

Bradley died at the age of 94 due to natural causes and was buried at Arlington National Cemetery.

== Legacy ==
After her death in 2002 Bradley was the recipient of a memorial resolution drafted by Congressman Joe Baca of California, regarding her exemplary service to this nation.

== Awards ==
Bradley's military record included 19 separate decorations, medals and ribbons. These included:

- Legion of Merit with oak leaf cluster
- Bronze Star Medal with oak leaf cluster
- Army Commendation Medal with oak leaf cluster
- Prisoner of War Medal
- Presidential Unit Citation with oak leaf cluster
- Meritorious Unit Commendation
- American Defense Service Medal with "Foreign Service" clasp
- American Campaign Medal
- Asiatic-Pacific Campaign Medal with two campaign stars
- World War II Victory Medal
- Army of Occupation Medal with "Japan" clasp
- National Defense Service Medal with star
- Korean Service Medal with three campaign stars
- Philippine Defense Medal (Republic of Philippines) with star
- Philippine Liberation Medal (Republic of Philippines) with star
- Philippine Independence Medal (Republic of Philippines)
- United Nations Service Medal
- Korean War Service Medal (Republic of Korea)
- Florence Nightingale Medal (International Red Cross)

== Dates of rank ==
- 2nd Lieutenant (relative rank) – 16 October 1934
- 1st Lieutenant (AUS) – 18 February 1945
- Captain (AUS) – 27 October 1945
- Captain (RA) – 19 August 1947 (to rank from 19 December 1942)
- Major (RA) – 15 May 1950
- Lieutenant Colonel (RA) – 23 July 1952
- Colonel (RA) – 4 March 1958
