= Nancy Run, West Virginia =

Nancy Run
- Unincorporated community
- Location within the state of West Virginia Nancy Run (the United States)
- Coordinates: 38°49′5″N 81°21′5″W
- Country: United States
- State: West Virginia
- County: Roane
- Elevation: 722 ft (220 m)
- Time zone: UTC-5 (Eastern (EST))
  - Summer (DST): UTC-4 (EDT)
- GNIS ID: 1555188

Nancy Run is an unincorporated community in Roane County, West Virginia, United States.
