= Spencer Presbyterian Church =

Historic church in West Virginia, United States

- U.S. National Register of Historic Places
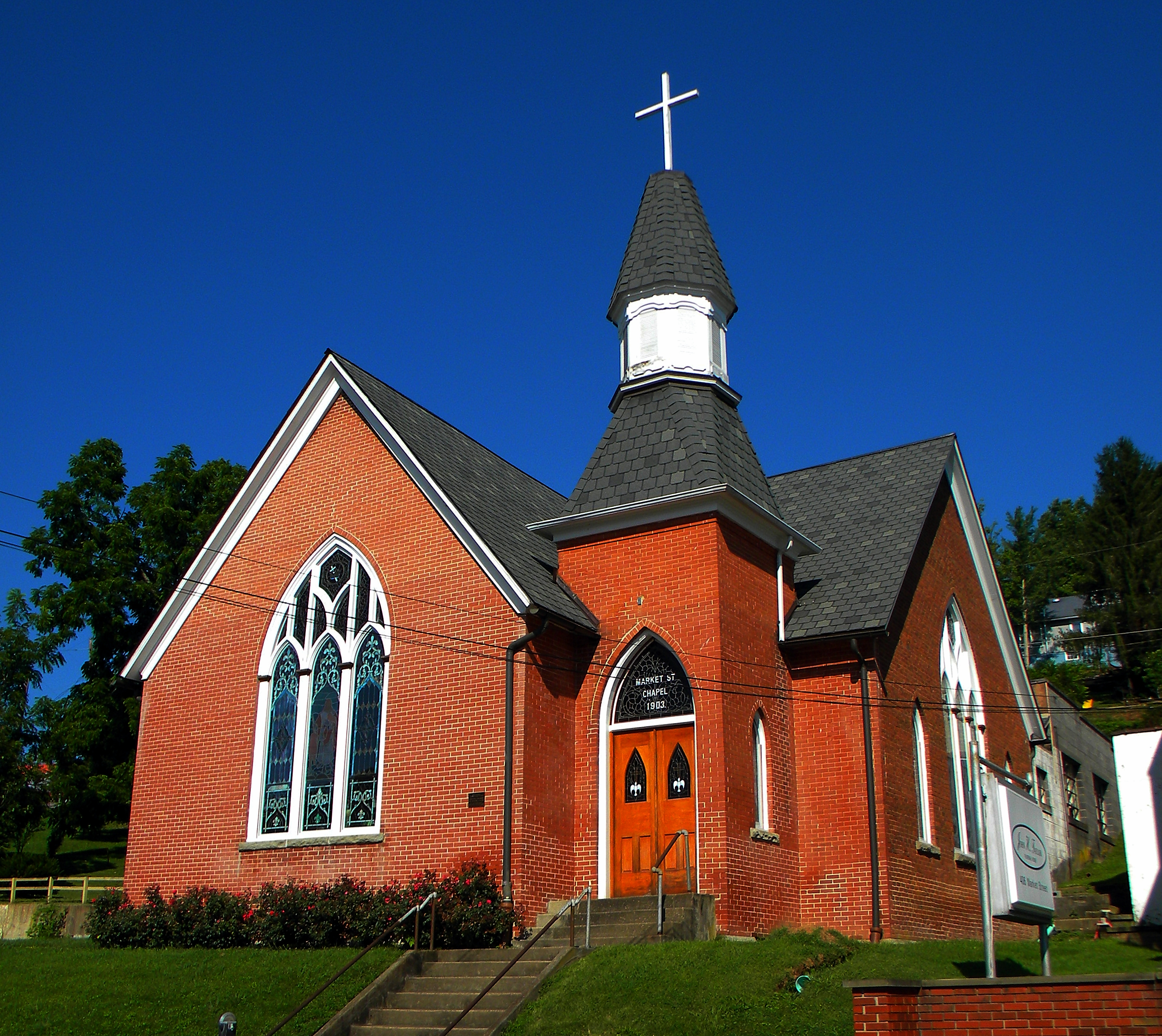
- Spencer_Presbyterian_Church

- Location within West Virginia Location within the United States
- Location: 408 Market St., Spencer, West Virginia
- Coordinates: 38°48′2″N 81°21′8″W
- Area: less than one acre
- Built: 1903
- Architectural style: Late Victorian Gothic
- NRHP reference No.: 16000315
- Added to NRHP: May 31, 2016

The Spencer Presbyterian Church, also known locally as the Market Street Chapel, is a historic church building at 408 Market Street in Spencer, West Virginia. It is a single-story T-shaped brick building, with a cross-gabled roof. The gable ends are adorned with large Gothic windows, and there is a square tower at the crook of the T, housing the main entrance and rising to an octagonal belfry and cross-topped octagonal roof. It was built in 1903, and is prominent as an example of brick construction when most churches in the area were wooden. It is also a significant local example of Late Victorian Gothic architecture.

It was listed on the National Register of Historic Places in 1999.

== See also ==
- National Register of Historic Places in Roane County, West Virginia
