= Looneyville, West Virginia =

Looneyville
- Unincorporated community
- Location within the state of West Virginia Looneyville (the United States)
- Coordinates: 38°39′52″N 81°18′11″W
- Country: United States
- State: West Virginia
- County: Roane
- Time zone: UTC-5 (Eastern (EST))
  - Summer (DST): UTC-4 (EDT)
- ZIP codes: 25259
- GNIS feature ID: 1549798

Looneyville is an unincorporated community on Flat Creek of the Pocatalico River in Roane County, West Virginia, United States. It is located on West Virginia Route 36. The community is named for Robert Looney, a pioneer settler. The post office was established in 1870.
