= Wallbach =

Wallbach may refer to:

- Wallbach (Bad Säckingen), a village in the state of Baden-Württemberg, part of Bad Säckingen
- Wallbach, Thuringia, a municipality in the state of Thuringia
- Wallbach, Switzerland, a municipality in the canton of Aargau

== See also ==
- Walbach (disambiguation)
- Wahlbach (disambiguation)
