= Reedyville, West Virginia =

Unincorporated community in West Virginia, US

Coordinates: 38°48′37″N 81°26′27″W

Reedyville is an unincorporated community in Roane County, in the U.S. state of West Virginia.

== History ==
A post office called Reedyville was established in 1846, and remained in operation until 1907. The community was named after nearby Reedy Creek.
