= Walton, West Virginia =

- Unincorporated community
- Location within West Virginia Location within the United States
- Coordinates: 38°38′20″N 81°24′07″W
- Country: United States
- State: West Virginia
- County: Roane
- Elevation: 712 ft (217 m)
- Time zone: UTC-5 (Eastern (EST))
  - Summer (DST): UTC-4 (EDT)
- ZIP code: 25286
- Area codes: 304 & 681
- GNIS feature ID: 1555914

Walton is an unincorporated community in Roane County, West Virginia, United States. Walton is located on U.S. Route 119, 11.5 miles (18.5 km) south-southwest of Spencer. Walton has a post office with ZIP code 25286.

According to tradition, Walton was named after the maiden name of a settler's wife.
