= Roxalana, West Virginia =

Roxalana
- Unincorporated community
- Location within the state of West Virginia Roxalana (the United States)
- Coordinates: 38°41′35″N 81°15′43″W
- Country: United States
- State: West Virginia
- County: Roane
- Elevation: 981 ft (299 m)
- Time zone: UTC-5 (Eastern (EST))
  - Summer (DST): UTC-4 (EDT)
- GNIS ID: 1549906

Roxalana is an unincorporated community in Roane County, West Virginia, United States.

The community was named after Roxalana Smith, the wife of the original owner of the town site.
