= Speed, West Virginia =

- Unincorporated community
- Location within West Virginia Location within the United States
- Coordinates: 38°44′01″N 81°22′39″W
- Country: United States
- State: West Virginia
- County: Roane
- Elevation: 807 ft (246 m)
- Time zone: UTC-5 (Eastern (EST))
  - Summer (DST): UTC-4 (EDT)
- Area codes: 304 & 681
- GNIS feature ID: 1555680

Speed is an unincorporated community in Roane County, West Virginia, United States. Speed is located on U.S. Route 119, south of Spencer.
