= Osbornes Mills, West Virginia =

Unincorporated community in West Virginia, US

Coordinates: 38°32′39″N 81°18′28″W

Osbornes Mills is an unincorporated community in Roane County, West Virginia, United States.

== History ==
A post office called Osbornes Mills was established in 1855, and remained in operation until 1935. The community was named after Archibald Osborne, the proprietor of a local mill.
