= Albert S. Heck Mansion =

Historic house in West Virginia, United States

- U.S. National Register of Historic Places
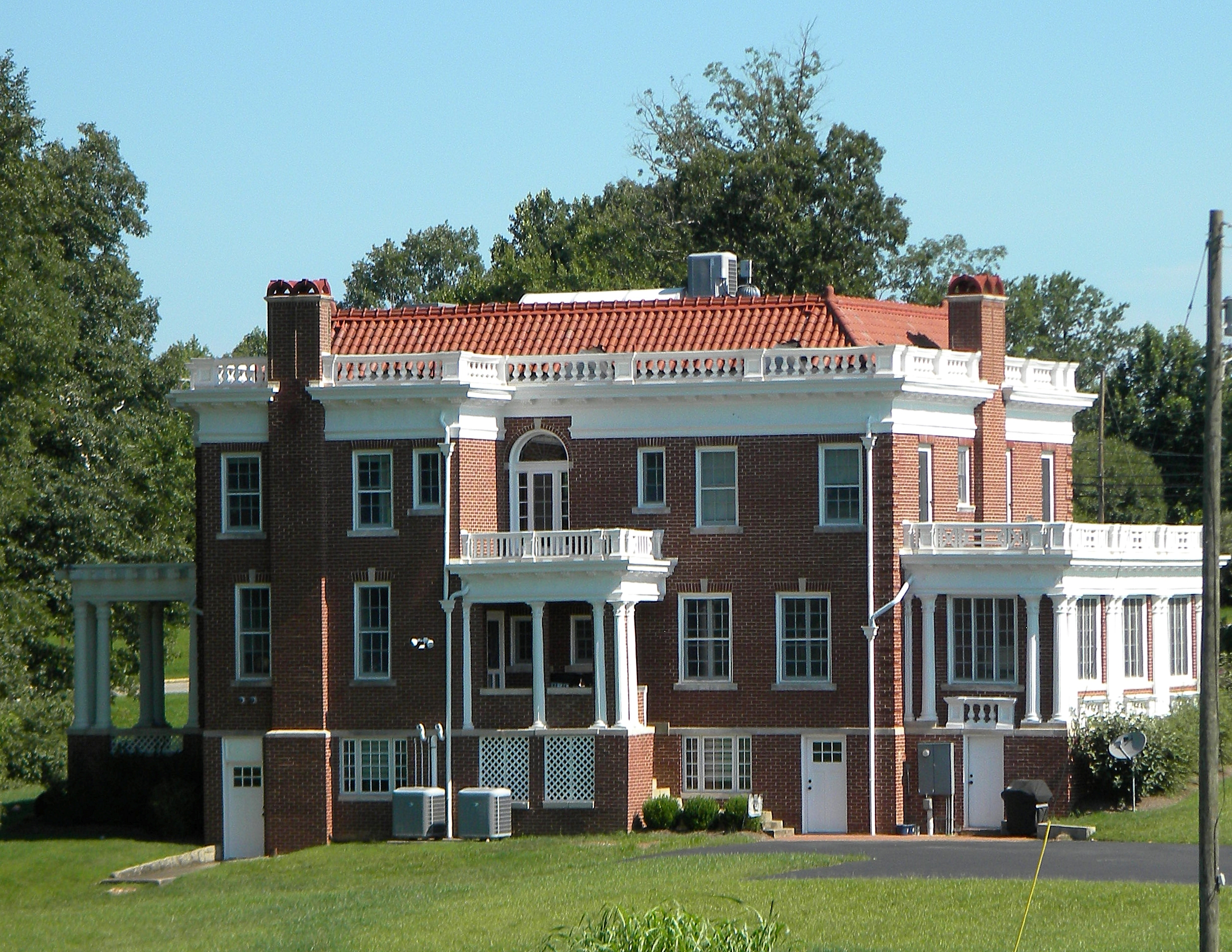
- Albert Heck Mansion

- Location within West Virginia Location within the United States
- Location: WV 14, near Spencer, West Virginia
- Coordinates: 38°48′54.8″N 81°22′8.9″W
- Area: 30 acres (12 ha)
- Built: 1925
- Architect: Knight, Wallace
- Architectural style: Classical Revival
- NRHP reference No.: 99000289
- Added to NRHP: March 5, 1999

Albert S. Heck Mansion, also known as the McIntosh Mansion, is a historic home located near Spencer, Roane County, West Virginia. It was designed by the construction firm of Wallace Knight of West Virginia, the same construction firm that constructed the West Virginia Executive Mansion. The Albert S. Heck Mansion and the Executive Mansion were constructed around the same time. It was built in 1925, and is two story, brick Neoclassical style mansion. It has 17 rooms, 6 baths and a full basement. It features a front portico with two story fluted Corinthian order columns and pilasters attached at the return to the house. The basement features locker rooms and showers. The house was built by Albert Heck, a local Roane County business man who invested in the booming oil industry in the early 1920s. Albert Heck was forced to sell the home during the Great Depression. It was purchased by the McIntosh family in 1936.

It was listed on the National Register of Historic Places in 1999.
