= Sanoma, West Virginia =

- Unincorporated community
- Location within West Virginia Location within the United States
- Coordinates: 38°57′52″N 81°19′28″W
- Country: United States
- State: West Virginia
- County: Wirt
- Elevation: 617 ft (188 m)
- Time zone: UTC-5 (Eastern (EST))
  - Summer (DST): UTC-4 (EDT)
- Area codes: 304 & 681
- GNIS feature ID: 1549912

Sanoma is an unincorporated community in Wirt County, West Virginia, United States. Sanoma lies at the confluence of the Little Kanawha River and Spring Creek, 8 miles (13 km) southeast of Elizabeth; County Route 36 passes through the community.
