= Chrystal Water and Power Company-Spencer Water and Ice Company =

Historic power station in Spencer, West Virginia, US

- U.S. National Register of Historic Places
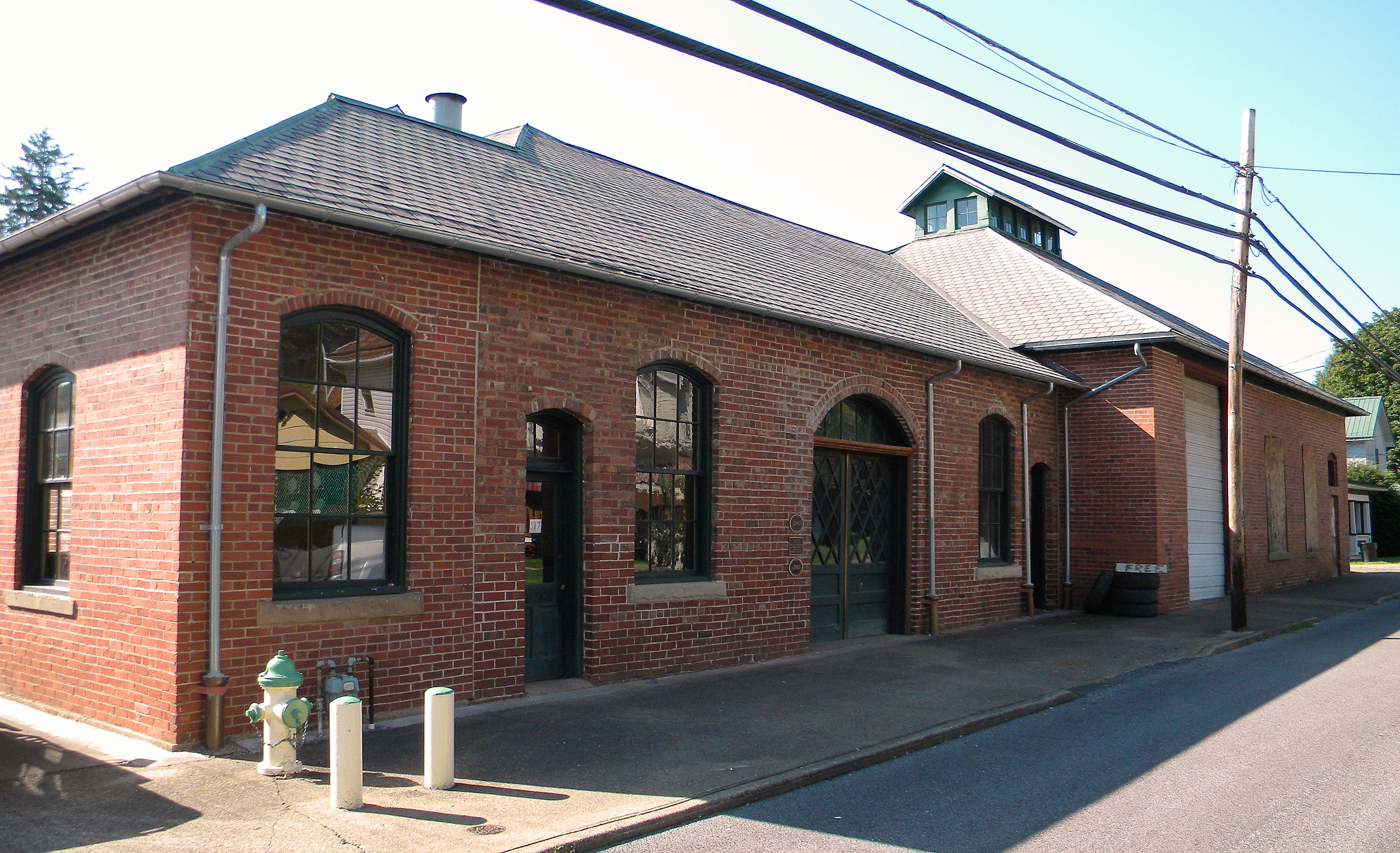
- Spencer_Water_and_Ice_Company

- Location within West Virginia Location within the United States
- Location: Church St., Spencer, West Virginia
- Coordinates: 38°47′55″N 81°21′8″W
- Area: less than one acre
- Built: 1903
- Architectural style: Romanesque
- NRHP reference No.: 07000238
- Added to NRHP: March 27, 2007

Chrystal Water and Power Company-Spencer Water and Ice Company, also known as Spencer Ice Plant, is a historic power station and ice manufacturing plant located at Spencer, Roane County, West Virginia. It was built in 1903 and expanded in 1911. It is a one-story, brick industrial building in the Romanesque Revival style. The original section measures 82 feet deep and 42 feet wide. Also on the property is a maintenance shed dated to the 1930s. Its development represented the first public attempt to bring water and power to the city of Spencer.

It was listed on the National Register of Historic Places in 2007.
