= Louis de Barth =

Franco-American Roman Catholic priest (1764–1844)

Adolphus Louis de Barth Walbach (November 1, 1764 – October 13, 1844) was a French-born Catholic priest in Pennsylvania and Maryland.

Born and raised in Alsace, France, he emigrated with his noble family to the United States during the French Revolution. He spent the rest of his life as a priest there, mostly at Conewago Chapel in rural Pennsylvania. After the Bishop of Philadelphia died in 1814, de Barth temporarily led the diocese as apostolic administrator until a new bishop arrived in 1820. After several years at a German-speaking Baltimore parish, he retired to Washington, D.C., in 1841 and died there three years later.

== Biography ==
=== Early life and priesthood ===
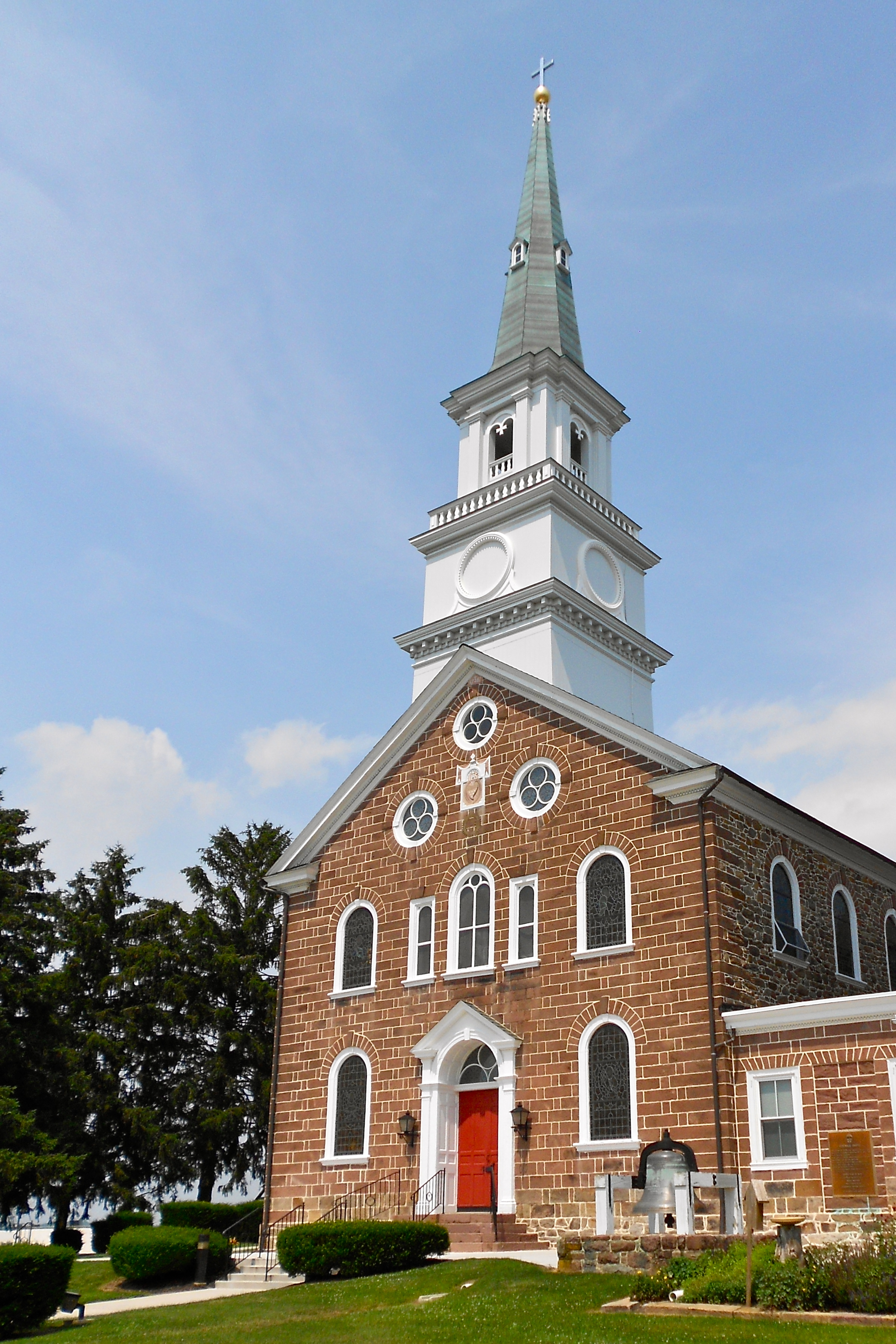
De Barth spent much of his clerical career at Conewago Chapel.

De Barth was born November 1, 1764, in the town of Munster, in Alsace, France. He was the son of a French nobleman, Jean Joseph de Barth, and his wife, Marie Louisa de Rohme. He showed an inclination toward clerical life from an early age, and his parents encouraged him in that vocation. After attending a Premonstratensian college in Belgium, he enrolled in a seminary in Strasbourg and was ordained there in 1790. The French Revolution forced many noble families into exile, including de Barth's, and they moved to the United States in 1791. (Note: DeBarth's brother, John de Barth Walbach, later served in the United States Army.) De Barth renounced his titles and presented himself to John Carroll, the bishop of Baltimore, for service as a secular priest. Initially, he worked at Bohemia Manor as an assistant priest; shortly thereafter, he was relocated to Port Tobacco, Maryland.

After spending three years serving in Port Tobacco, de Barth was assigned to a church in Pennsylvania in 1795. The main church in the area, Conewago Chapel, was the center of the only parish in 10,000 square miles (26,000 km^{2}) of the Pennsylvania frontier, an area that contained few Catholics. The sparsely populated area had been mostly settled by Germans, who were pleased to have a priest who was able to speak their native language. In 1798, Carroll visited de Barth at Conewago to tour that part of his diocese and to administer the sacrament of confirmation. Michael Francis Egan, an Irish Franciscan, joined him there in 1802. In 1804, de Barth was formally put in charge of Conewago Chapel, which had previously fallen under the jurisdiction of the Jesuits. At the same time, he continued making visitations to the small rural chapels in the area. In 1806, de Barth laid the cornerstone of a new church, St. Patrick's, in Carlisle, Pennsylvania. Four years later, he helped found another St. Patrick's church, this time in York.

=== Apostolic administrator ===
In 1814, Egan (now bishop of Philadelphia) promoted de Barth to the position of Vicar General. Egan died shortly thereafter. Until a suitable bishop could be found, Carroll, now Archbishop of Baltimore, appointed de Barth as the apostolic administrator. De Barth tried to refuse this assignment, likely due to the ongoing disputes in Philadelphia between the clergy and the lay trustees of the city's parishes over who should control the churches, but he eventually accepted and took temporary control of the diocese. He spent little time in the city, leaving day-to-day control of the parishes there to Terrence McGill, a local priest.

Carroll considered requesting de Barth's appointment as bishop, but decided against it because of de Barth's lack of theological study and reputation for having a quick temper. Carroll died in 1815, and his successor, Leonard Neale, offered de Barth the position of bishop, but de Barth declined it. In a letter to Neale, de Barth wrote that

if you do not forward my objections [to the appointment] to the Holy See ... I will not accept, but will kneel down and devoutly put the bulls in the fire ... and then farewell, Monseigneur. Neither you nor anyone else shall ever know the corner of the globe where I shall vegetate the few years still left to me to live.

Neale accepted de Barth's refusal, and the see remained vacant. In 1817, after Neale died, de Barth traveled to Baltimore to participate in the episcopal consecration of Neale's successor, Ambrose Maréchal. (Note: Although three bishops are typically required for ordination, the Pope may issue a dispensation when co-consecrators are unavailable. See Canon 1014.)

Because he expected the appointment of a new bishop soon, de Barth hesitated to take any drastic actions as administrator. As such, he spent much of his time in the city and, as historian Joseph L.J. Kirlin wrote in 1909, discipline "became more and more relaxed." The ongoing dispute between the lay trustees of St. Mary's Church and the church hierarchy grew more rancorous when de Barth assigned a new priest, William Hogan, to the diocese in 1820. Hogan instantly took the side of the trustees against de Barth; Hogan's unusual behavior would eventually cause his excommunication, but not until de Barth's tenure as apostolic administrator had ended.

=== Later life ===
After a vacancy of five years, the see of Philadelphia found a new bishop in Henry Conwell, an Irish-born priest who was installed in 1819 and arrived the next year, freeing de Barth to return to Conewago. De Barth remained at Conewago until 1828 when Maréchal's successor in Baltimore, James Whitfield, appointed him pastor of St. John German Catholic Church in that city. He served there for several years until the parish closed in 1841, de Barth retired to Georgetown College in Washington, D.C., to live out his final years (his brother, John, lived nearby). He died there on October 13, 1844, at the age of seventy-nine, and was buried in the cemetery of Holy Trinity Catholic Church in Washington.

== Sources ==
Books

- Bransom, Charles N. (1990). Ordinations of U.S. Catholic Bishops, 1790–1989. Washington, D.C.: United States Catholic Conference. ISBN 1-55586-323-X.
- Ennis, Arthur J. (1976). "Chapter Two: The New Diocese". In Connelly, James F. (ed.). The History of the Archdiocese of Philadelphia. Wynnewood, Pennsylvania: Unigraphics Incorporated. pp. 63–112. OCLC 4192313.
- Kirlin, Joseph L.J. (1909). Catholicity in Philadelphia. Philadelphia, Pennsylvania: John Jos. McVey. OCLC 38065187.
- Quigley, Robert E. (1976). "Chapter One: Catholic Beginnings in the Delaware Valley". In Connelly, James F. (ed.). The History of the Archdiocese of Philadelphia. Wynnewood, Pennsylvania: Unigraphics Incorporated. pp. 1–62. OCLC 4192313.
- Reily, John T. (1885). Conewago: A Collection of Catholic Local History. Martinsburg, West Virginia: Herald Print. OCLC 6664876.

Articles

- Foin, Jules C. (1886). "Rev. Louis Barth: a Pioneer Missionary in Pennsylvania and an Administrator of the Diocese of Philadelphia". Records of the American Catholic Historical Society of Philadelphia. 2: 29–37.
- Ganss, Henry G. (1895). "History of St. Patrick's Church, Carlisle, Pennsylvania". Records of the American Catholic Historical Society of Philadelphia. 6: 266–350.
