= Château de Walbach =

Castle in Haut-Rhin, Alsace, France

Coordinates: 48.0646°N 7.2209°E

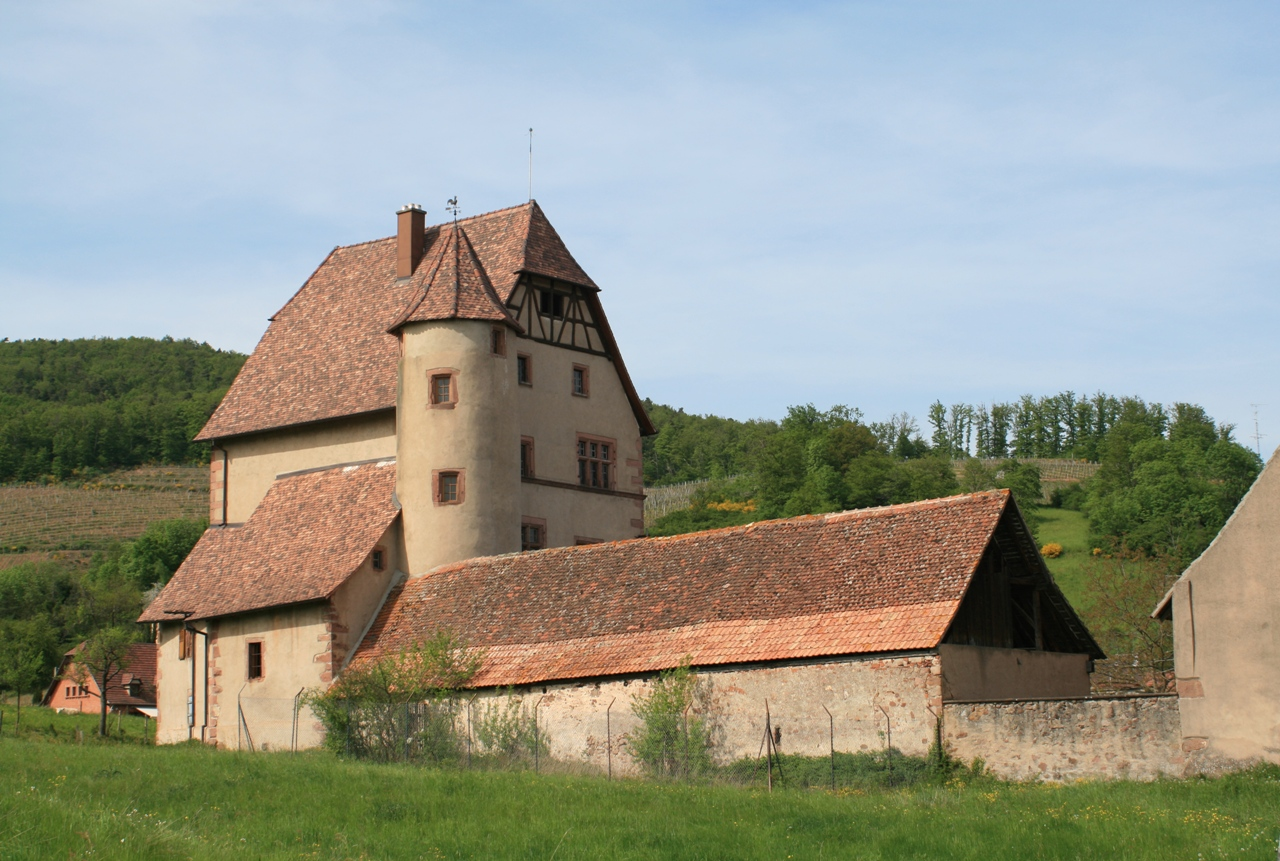
Château de Walbach

Château de Walbach is a castle in the commune of Walbach, in the department of Haut-Rhin, Alsace, France. It is a listed historical monument since 1946.
