= Wahlbach =

Wahlbach may refer to:

- Wahlbach, Haut-Rhin, a commune in north-eastern France
- Wahlbach, Rhineland-Palatinate, a municipality in Germany
- Wahlbach (Burbach), a district of Burbach in North Rhine-Westphalia, Germany

== See also ==
- Walbach (disambiguation)
- Wallbach (disambiguation)
