= Lattimer, West Virginia =

Lattimer
- Unincorporated community
- Location within the state of West Virginia Lattimer (the United States)
- Coordinates: 38°50′31″N 81°30′53″W
- Country: United States
- State: West Virginia
- County: Roane
- Time zone: UTC-5 (Eastern (EST))
  - Summer (DST): UTC-4 (EDT)

Lattimer is an unincorporated community in Roane County, West Virginia, United States. Its elevation is 722 feet (220 m).
