= Elana, West Virginia =

Unincorporated community in West Virginia, United States

Elana
- Unincorporated community
- Location within the state of West Virginia Elana (the United States)
- Coordinates: 38°37′6″N 81°6′30″W
- Country: United States
- State: West Virginia
- County: Roane
- Time zone: UTC-5 (Eastern (EST))
  - Summer (DST): UTC-4 (EDT)

Elana is an unincorporated community in Roane County, West Virginia, United States. Its elevation is 840 feet (246 m).

The community was named after a brand of face powder.
