= WYRC-LP =

- Spencer, West Virginia; United States
- Broadcast area: Metro Spencer
- Frequency: 92.3 MHz
- Branding: Power 92

Programming
- Format: Hot adult contemporary
- Affiliations: Fox News Radio; Fox Sports Radio; West Virginia MetroNews

Ownership
- Owner: Roane County Board of Education

History
- First air date: November 2002
- Call sign meaning: Young Roane County

Technical information
- Licensing authority: FCC
- Facility ID: 133971
- Class: LP100
- ERP: 100 watts
- HAAT: 19.14 meters (62.8 ft)
- Transmitter coordinates: 38°48′48.3″N 81°22′1.4″W

Links
- Public license information: LMS
- Webcast: Listen live
- Website: https://sites.google.com/view/power92spencer

WYRC-LP is a hot adult contemporary formatted broadcast radio station. The station is licensed to and serving Spencer in West Virginia. WYRC-LP is owned by and operated by the Roane County Board of Education.
