= Wallback Wildlife Management Area =

State Wildlife Management Area in Clay, Kanawha, and Roane counties, West Virginia

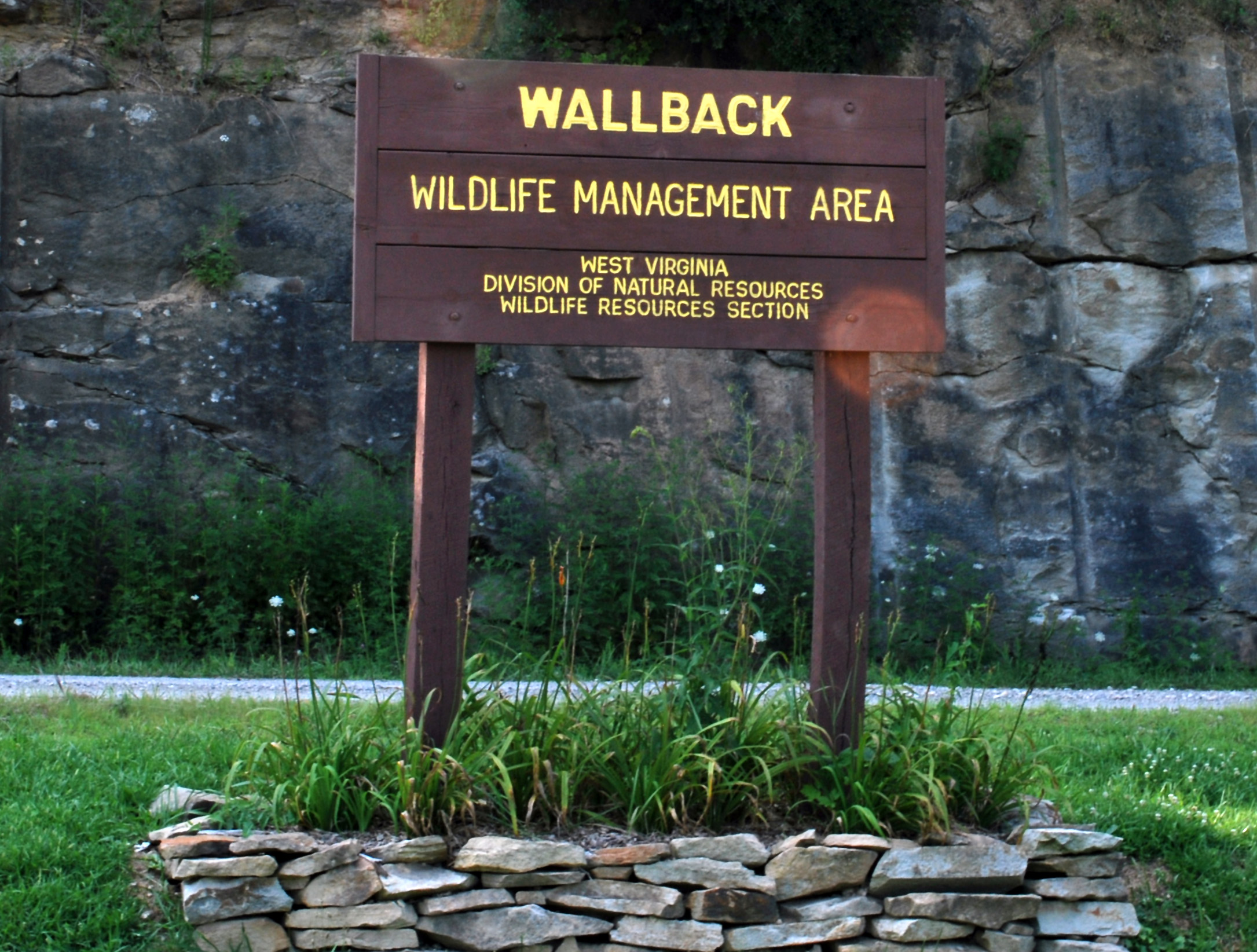
- Entrance sign along WV 36

- Location within West Virginia
- Location: West Virginia, United States
- Coordinates: 38°32′11″N 81°12′54″W
- Area: 11,758 acres (47.58 km^{2})
- Elevation: 1,033 ft (315 m)
- Operator: Wildlife Resources Section, WVDNR
- Website: WVDNR District 3 Wildlife Management Areas

Wallback Wildlife Management Area is located on 11,758 acres (4,758 ha) northwest of Clay in Clay, Kanawha and Roane Counties, West Virginia.
