= Roane County Schools (West Virginia) =

School district in Roane County, West Virginia

Roane County Schools is the operating school district within Roane County, West Virginia. It is governed by the Roane County Board of Education. Reportedly, nearly 80% of the Roane County school district's students are at or below the poverty level, as said by a longtime reading instructor in the Roane County School system.

== Schools ==
=== High schools ===
- Roane County High School

=== Middle schools ===
- Geary Elementary/Middle School
- Spencer Middle School
- Walton Elementary/Middle School

=== Elementary schools ===
- Reedy Elementary School
- Spencer Elementary School
