= WVRC-FM =

- Spencer, West Virginia; United States
- Frequency: 104.7 MHz

Programming
- Format: Country

Ownership
- Owner: Andrew Miller; (ASM Communications Inc.)

Technical information
- Licensing authority: FCC
- Facility ID: 62295
- Class: A
- ERP: 4,800 Watts
- HAAT: 112 meters
- Transmitter coordinates: 38°47′40″N 81°17′36″W

Links
- Public license information: Public file; LMS
- Website: https://www.wvrcfm.com

WVRC-FM (104.7 FM) is a radio station broadcasting a Country format. Licensed to Spencer, West Virginia, United States, it serves the Spencer area. The station is currently owned by Andrew Miller, through licensee ASM Communications Inc.
