= Wallbach, Thuringia =

Wallbach
- Ortsteil of Meiningen
- Interactive map of Wallbach
- Location within Germany Location within Thuringia
- Coordinates: 50°38′N 10°24′E
- Country: Germany
- State: Thuringia
- District: Schmalkalden-Meiningen
- Town: Meiningen

Area
  - Total: 5.07 km^{2} (1.96 sq mi)
- Elevation: 300 m (980 ft)

Population (2017-12-31)
  - Total: 375
  - Density: 74.0/km^{2} (192/sq mi)
- Time zone: UTC+01:00 (CET)
  - Summer (DST): UTC+02:00 (CEST)
- Postal codes: 98617
- Dialling codes: 03693
- Website: www.wallbach-thueringen.de

Wallbach (German pronunciation: [ˈvalbax]) is a village and a former municipality in the district Schmalkalden-Meiningen, in Thuringia, Germany. Since 1 January 2019, it is part of the town Meiningen.
