= WVRC (AM) =

- Spencer, West Virginia; United States
- Frequency: 1400 kHz

Programming
- Format: Southern gospel

Ownership
- Owner: Andrew Miller; (ASM Communications Inc.)

Technical information
- Licensing authority: FCC
- Facility ID: 62294
- Class: C
- Power: 1,000 watts unlimited
- Transmitter coordinates: 38°48′23″N 81°21′40″W
- Translator: 103.5 W278CP (Spencer)

Links
- Public license information: Public file; LMS
- Website: wvrcfm.com

WVRC (1400 kHz) is an AM radio station broadcasting a southern gospel format. Licensed to Spencer, West Virginia, United States, it serves the area. The station is currently owned by Andrew Miller, through licensee ASM Communications Inc.
