= Maysel, West Virginia =

- Unincorporated community
- Interactive map of Maysel, West Virginia
- Coordinates: 38°29′09″N 81°06′45″W
- Country: United States
- State: West Virginia
- County: Clay
- Elevation: 1,030 ft (310 m)
- Time zone: UTC-5 (Eastern (EST))
  - Summer (DST): UTC-4 (EDT)
- ZIP code: 25133
- Area codes: 304 & 681
- GNIS feature ID: 1542915

Maysel is an unincorporated community in Clay County, West Virginia, United States. Maysel is located on West Virginia Route 4, 2.5 miles (4.0 km) northwest of Clay. Maysel has a post office with ZIP code 25133.

The community was named after Maysel Kyle, the young daughter of a local merchant.
