= Camp Walbach =

Coordinates: 41.2886°N 105.1842°W

Camp Walbach, named in honor of General J. B. Walbach, was located approximately 25 miles northwest of Cheyenne, Wyoming and directly west of the crossing at the head of Lodge Pole Creek. It was established as a military post on September 20, 1858 in what was then Nebraska Territory to guard and protect the emigrants through Cheyenne Pass, a dangerous spot on the new Overland Trail. After going through Pass, the emigrants were soon on the Laramie Plains, where this trail connected and became a part of the Overland Stage Route from the south.

It was abandoned on April 19, 1859 and today is represented by a marker installed in 1914 by the Sons of the American Revolution.
