= Robey Theatre =

United States historic place

- U.S. National Register of Historic Places
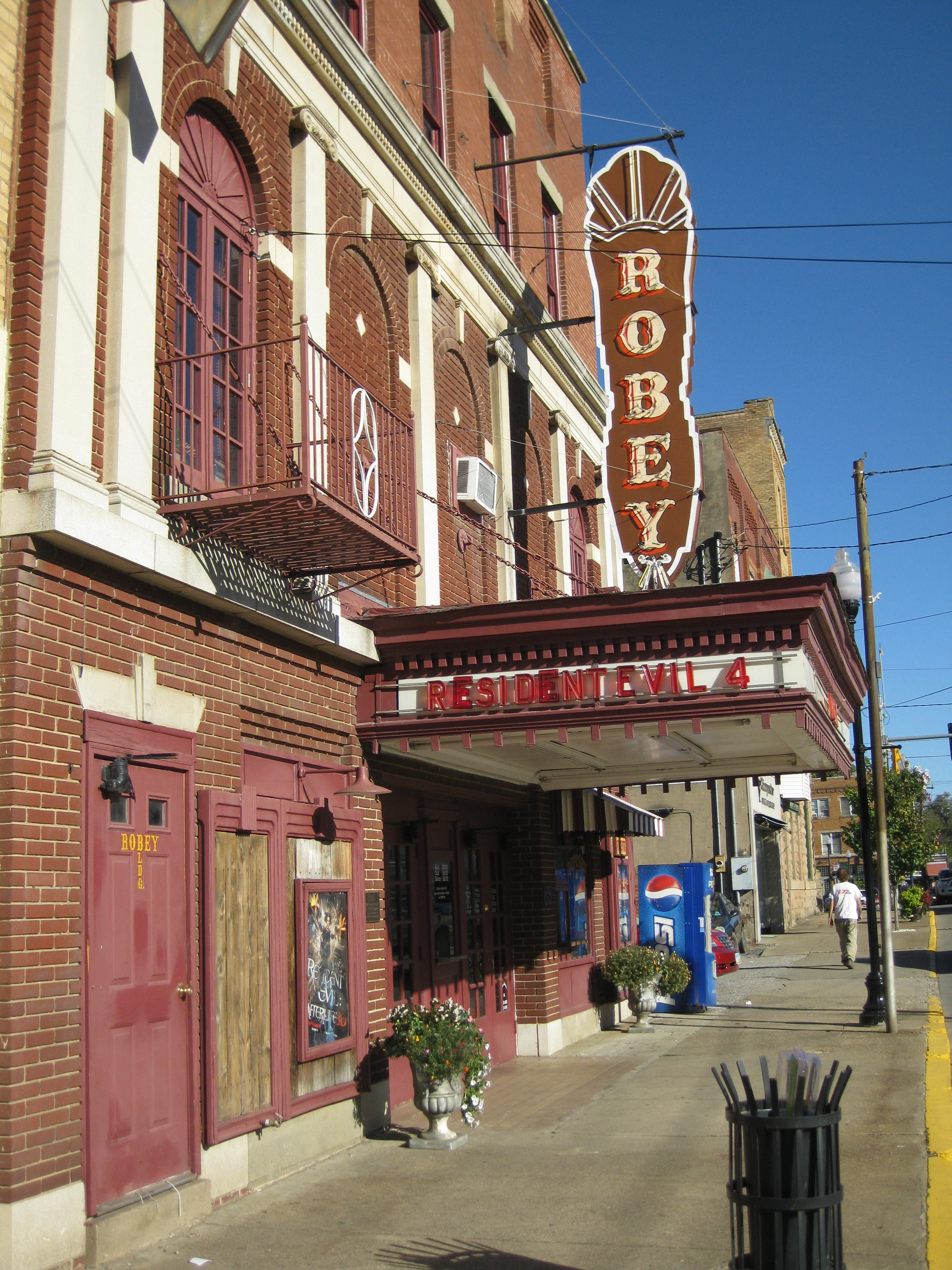
- The theater in 2010

- Location within West Virginia Location within the United States
- Location: 318 Main St., Spencer, West Virginia
- Coordinates: 38°48′8.3″N 81°21′4.8″W
- Area: 0.1 acres (0.040 ha)
- Built: 1907
- Architect: Carmichael & Millspaugh
- Architectural style: Late 19th And 20th Century Revivals, Classical Revival, Italian Renaissance
- NRHP reference No.: 89000182
- Added to NRHP: March 29, 1989

Robey Theatre is a historic theater located at Spencer, Roane County, West Virginia. It was built in 1907 and extensively remodeled in 1926. It is a three-story, five bay wide Neoclassical / Italian Renaissance style building. The front facade features a large central entrance bay, with a ticket booth flanked on both sides by two sets of double doors. Above the entrance is a marquee anchored to the second floor by chains and distinctive neon sign above. It is the oldest continuously operating movie theater in the United States.

The Robey Theatre is currently owned by Aaron and Melissa Richardson.

It was listed on the National Register of Historic Places on March 29, 1989.
