= Wallback, West Virginia =

- Unincorporated community
- Location within West Virginia Location within the United States
- Coordinates: 38°33′56″N 81°07′49″W
- Country: United States
- State: West Virginia
- Counties: Clay and Roane
- Elevation: 764 ft (233 m)
- Time zone: UTC-5 (Eastern (EST))
  - Summer (DST): UTC-4 (EDT)
- ZIP code: 25285
- Area codes: 304 & 681
- GNIS feature ID: 1555908

Wallback is an unincorporated community in Clay and Roane counties, West Virginia, United States. Wallback is located at the junction of Interstate 79 and West Virginia Route 36, 7.5 miles (12.1 km) north-northwest of Clay. Wallback has a post office with ZIP code 25285.

The community is named for John de Barth Walbach, an Alsatian hussar of the French Revolutionary Wars who became an aide to Alexander Hamilton, rose to Adjutant General of the United States during the War of 1812, and was the oldest acting officer in U.S. history. Walbach inherited 10,000 acres on the Elk River from his father, Count Jean-Joseph de Barth, who led the "French 500" fleeing the French Revolution and founding Gallipolis, Ohio.
