= Walbach, Haut-Rhin =

Commune in Grand Est, France

Walbach Wàlbàch
- Commune
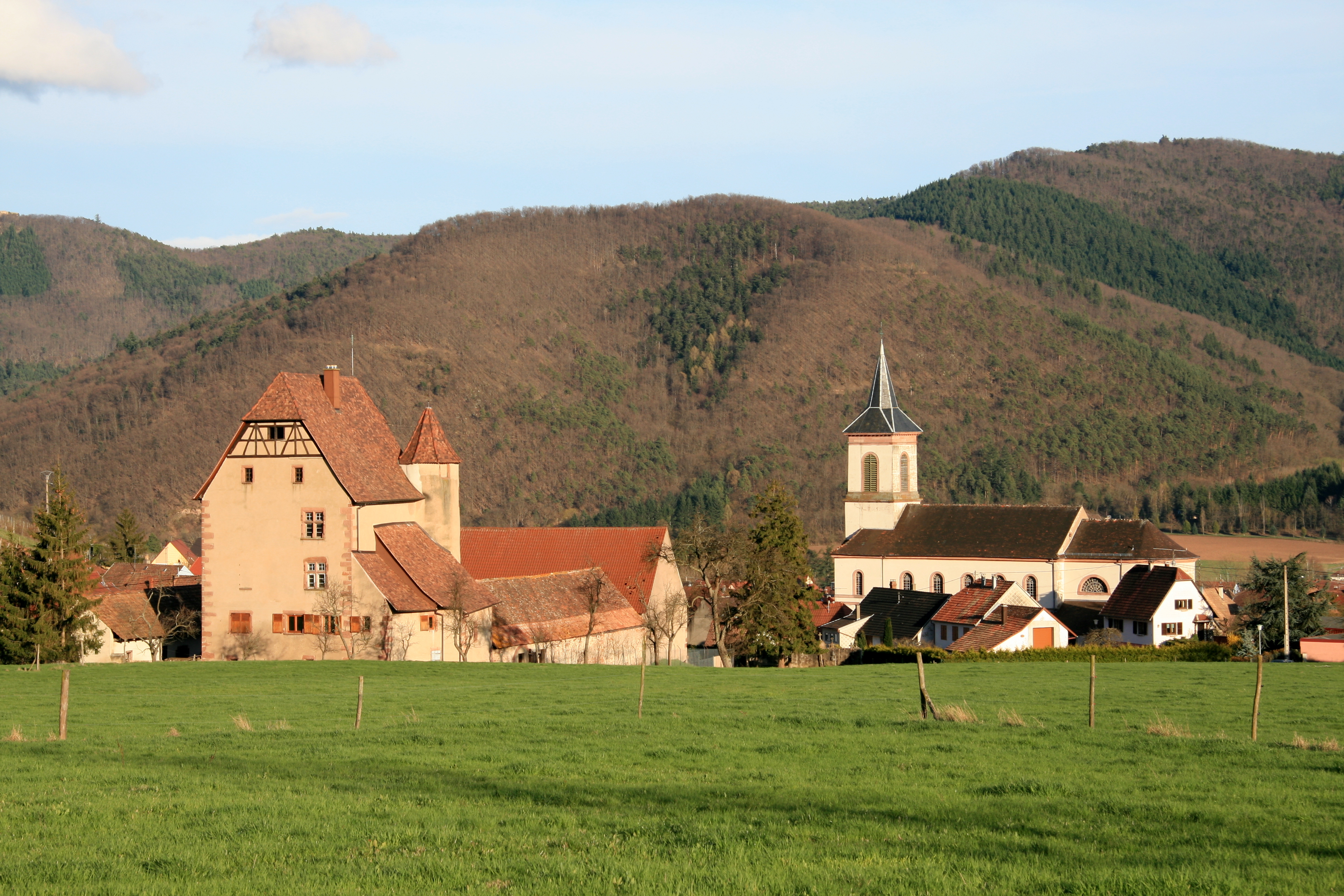
- The chateau and church in Walbach

- Coat of arms
- Location of Walbach
- Location within France Location within Grand Est
- Coordinates: 48°03′47″N 7°13′26″E
- Country: France
- Region: Grand Est
- Department: Haut-Rhin
- Arrondissement: Colmar-Ribeauvillé
- Canton: Wintzenheim
- Intercommunality: Colmar Agglomération

Government
  - Mayor (2020–2026): Philippe Better
- Area^{1}: 5.45 km^{2} (2.10 sq mi)
- Elevation: 320 m (1,050 ft)
- Highest elevation: 890 m (2,920 ft)
- Lowest elevation: 274 m (899 ft)
- Population (2023): 936
  - Density: 172/km^{2} (445/sq mi)
- Time zone: UTC+01:00 (CET)
  - Summer (DST): UTC+02:00 (CEST)
- INSEE/Postal code: 68354 /68230
- ^{1} French Land Register data, which excludes lakes, ponds, glaciers > 1 km^{2} (0.386 sq mi or 247 acres) and river estuaries.

Walbach (Alemannic German: Wàlbàch) is a commune in the Haut-Rhin department in Grand Est in north-eastern France.

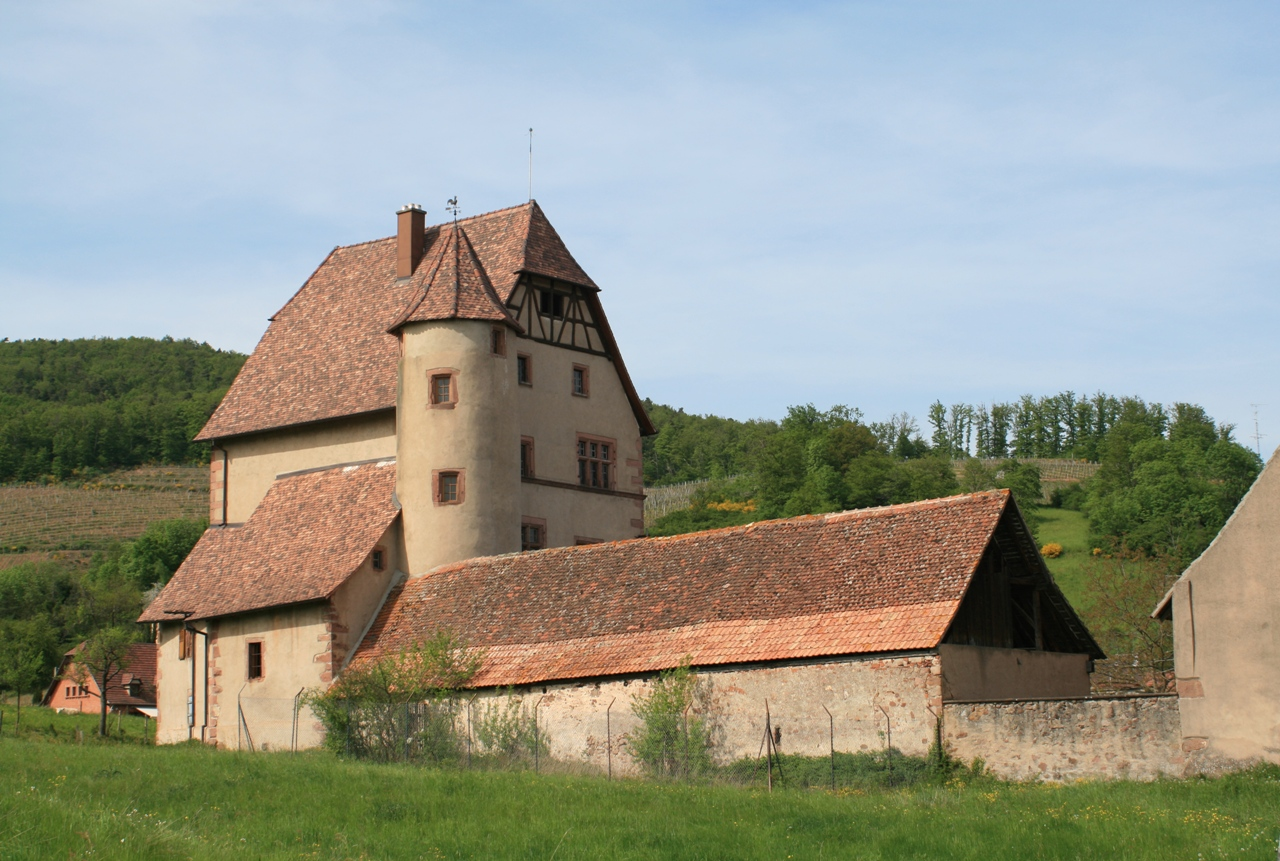
Castle of Walbach

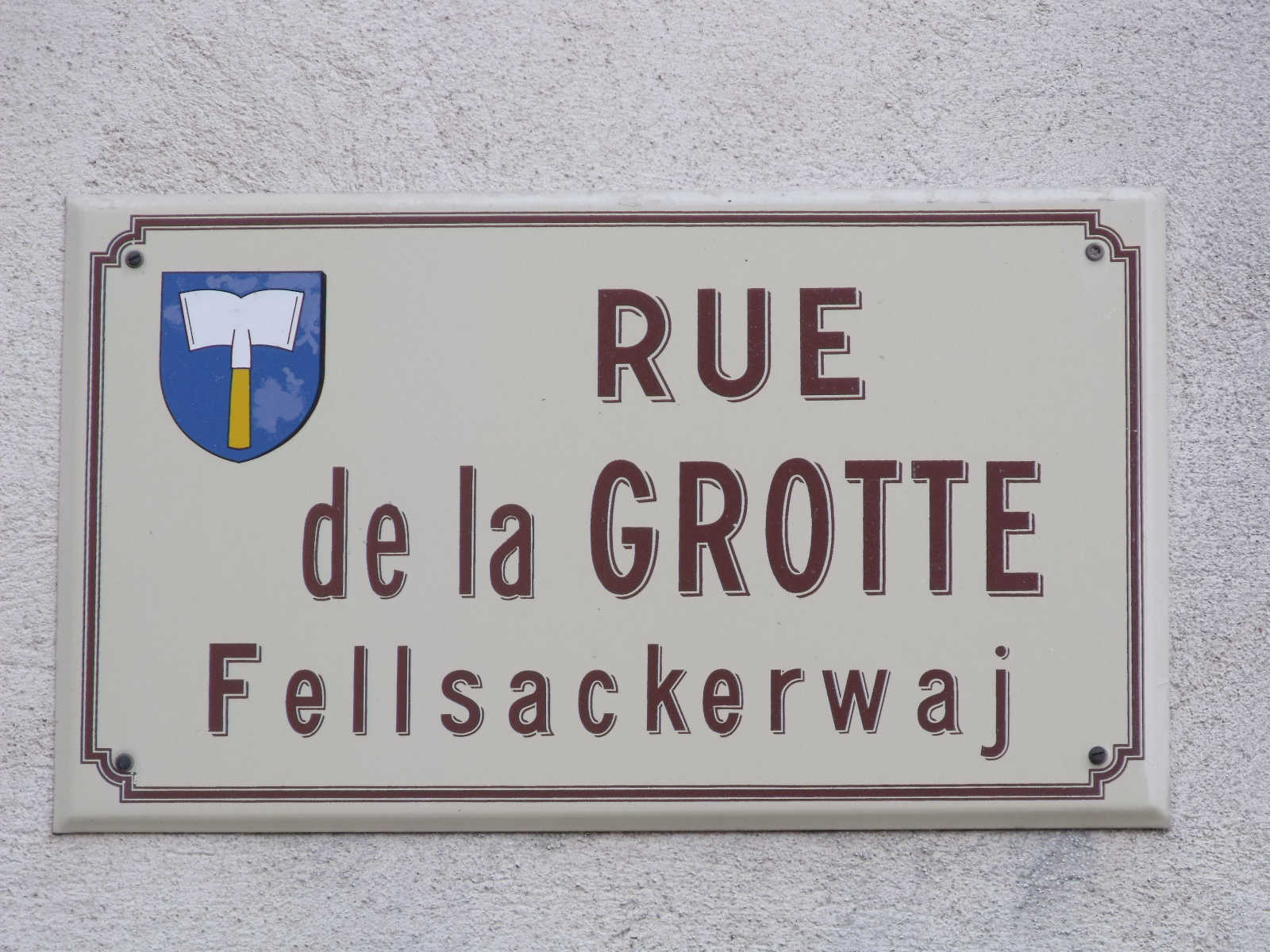
Street name sign with Alsatian name

== Population ==
Historical population
Year	Pop.	±% p.a.
1968	534	—
1975	583	+1.26%
1982	646	+1.48%
1990	759	+2.04%
1999	930	+2.28%
2007	902	−0.38%
2012	868	−0.77%
2017	904	+0.82%
2023	936	+0.58%
Source: INSEE

== See also ==
- Communes of the Haut-Rhin department
