= West Virginia Route 36 =

State highway in West Virginia, United States

West Virginia Route 36

Route information
- Maintained by WVDOH
- Length: 36.2 mi (58.3 km)

Major junctions
- South end: WV 4 in Maysel
- I-79 near Wallback
- North end: US 119 in Spencer

Location
- Country: United States
- State: West Virginia
- Counties: Clay, Roane

Highway system
- West Virginia State Highway System; Interstate; US; State
← US 35	→ WV 37

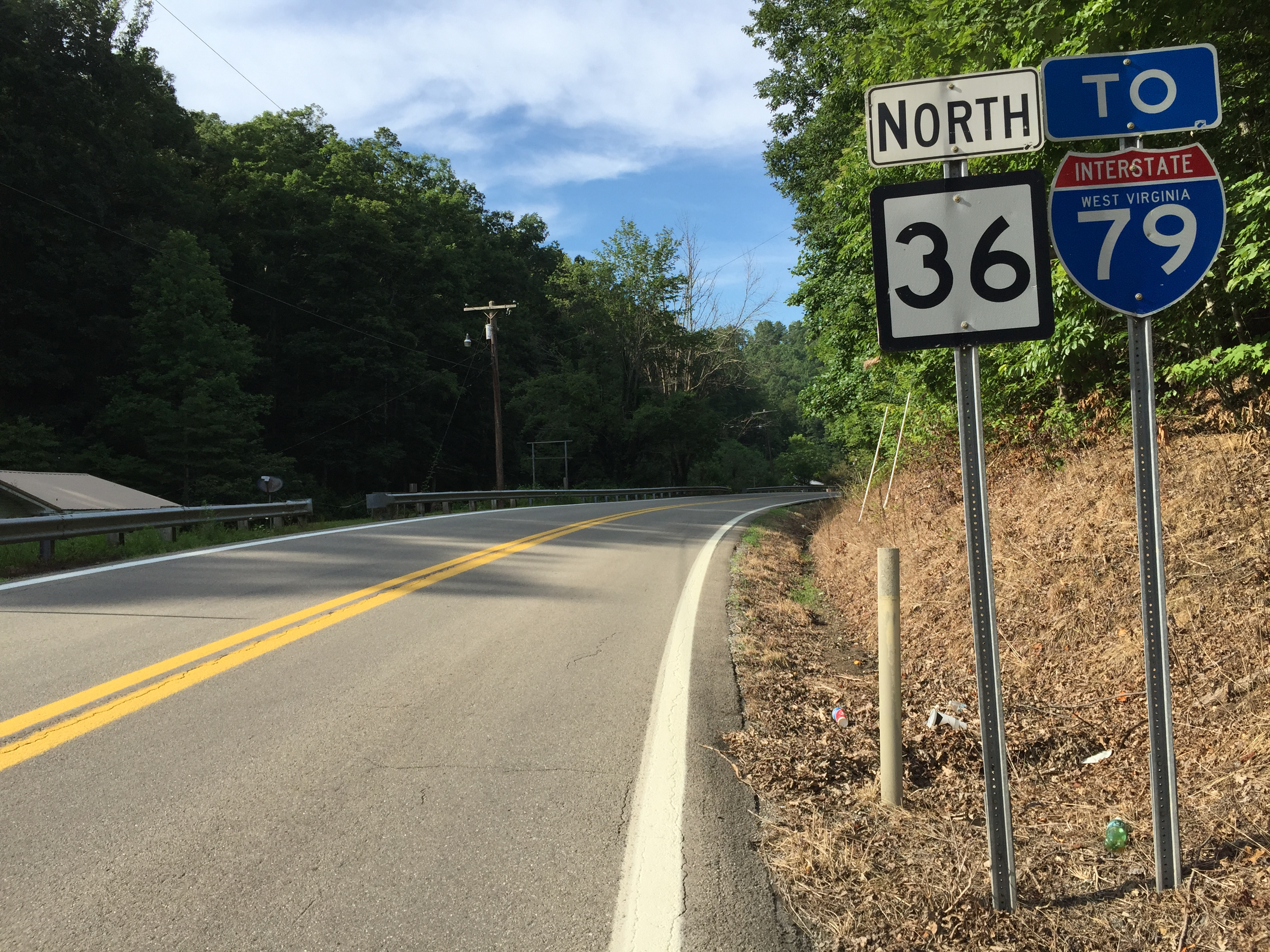
View north along WV 36 at WV 4 in Maysel

West Virginia Route 36 is a north–south state highway in West Virginia. The southern terminus of the route is at West Virginia Route 4 in Maysel. The northern terminus is at U.S. Route 119 in Spencer.

== Major intersections ==
County	Location	mi	km	Destinations	Notes
Clay				WV 4	
Roane	Wallback			I-79 – Charleston, Clarksburg	I-79 exit 34
Roane				US 119 – Clendenin, Spencer	
1.000 mi = 1.609 km; 1.000 km = 0.621 mi
