= Spencer, West Virginia =

City in West Virginia, US

- City
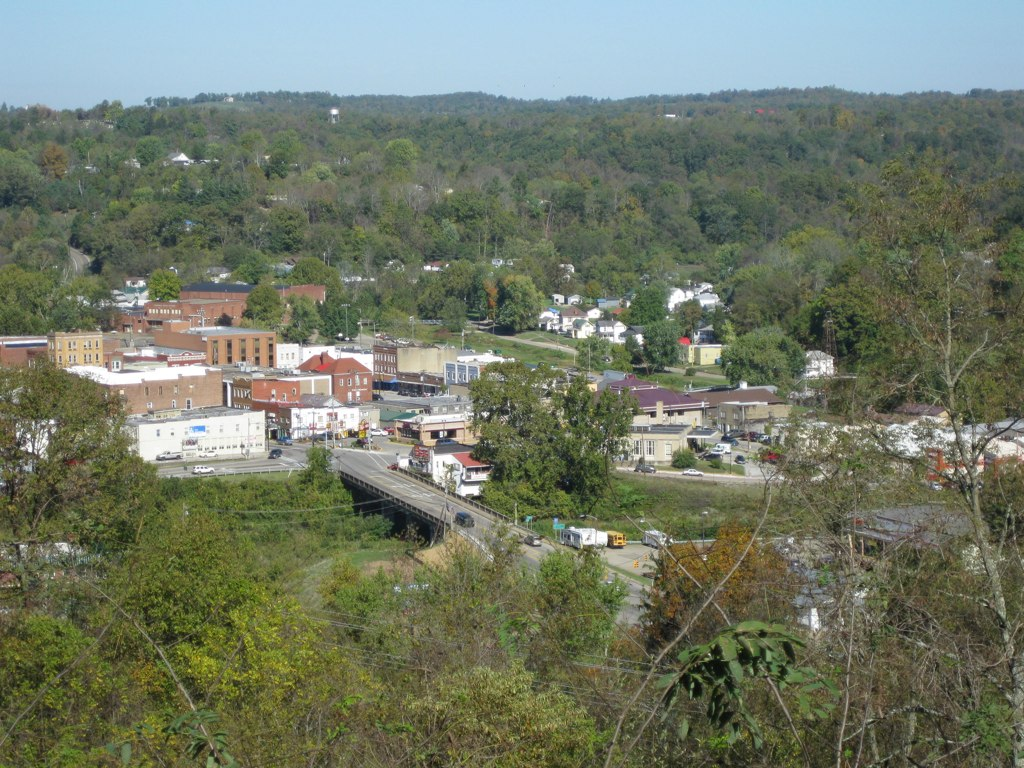
- Skyline of Spencer from a nearby park

- Flag Logo
- Interactive map of Spencer, West Virginia
- Location within West Virginia Location within the United States
- Coordinates: 38°48′6″N 81°21′6″W
- Country: United States
- State: West Virginia
- County: Roane

Area
  - Total: 1.27 sq mi (3.30 km^{2})
  - Land: 1.26 sq mi (3.26 km^{2})
  - Water: 0.015 sq mi (0.04 km^{2})
- Elevation: 748 ft (228 m)

Population (2020)
  - Total: 2,063
  - Estimate (2021): 2,038
  - Density: 1,620.1/sq mi (625.51/km^{2})
- Time zone: UTC-5 (Eastern (EST))
  - Summer (DST): UTC-4 (EDT)
- ZIP code: 25276
- Area code: 304
- FIPS code: 54-75820
- GNIS feature ID: 1547124
- Website: www.cityofspencer.com

Downtown buildings in Spencer, West Virginia

Spencer is a city in and the county seat of Roane County, West Virginia, United States. Originally known as "California," Spencer was chartered in 1858, and named after Spencer Roane (1762–1822), a distinguished jurist from Virginia, who served on the Virginia Supreme Court of Appeals, and for whom Roane County was named. The population was 2,062 at the 2020 census. Spencer is the home of the annual West Virginia Black Walnut Festival. Points of interest include Charles Fork Lake, Chrystal Water and Power Company-Spencer Water and Ice Company, the McIntosh Mansion, and the Robey Theatre.

== Geography ==
Spencer is located at 38°48′6″N 81°21′6″W (38.801690, -81.351689). Spring Creek flows through the city.

According to the United States Census Bureau, the city has a total area of 1.28 square miles (3.32 km^{2}), of which 1.26 square miles (3.26 km^{2}) is land and 0.02 square miles (0.05 km^{2}) is water.

=== Climate ===
The climate in this area is characterized by hot, humid summers and generally mild to cool winters. According to the Köppen Climate Classification system, Spencer has a humid subtropical climate, abbreviated "Cfa" on climate maps.

Climate data for Spencer, West Virginia (1991–2020 normals, extremes 1892–present)
Month	Jan	Feb	Mar	Apr	May	Jun	Jul	Aug	Sep	Oct	Nov	Dec	Year
Record high °F (°C)	82 (28)	80 (27)	90 (32)	94 (34)	99 (37)	101 (38)	105 (41)	104 (40)	103 (39)	93 (34)	86 (30)	81 (27)	105 (41)
Mean maximum °F (°C)	66.7 (19.3)	68.2 (20.1)	77.1 (25.1)	85.0 (29.4)	87.5 (30.8)	90.4 (32.4)	92.2 (33.4)	91.4 (33.0)	90.0 (32.2)	83.0 (28.3)	76.1 (24.5)	66.9 (19.4)	93.5 (34.2)
Mean daily maximum °F (°C)	39.6 (4.2)	43.3 (6.3)	52.8 (11.6)	65.3 (18.5)	73.1 (22.8)	80.2 (26.8)	83.3 (28.5)	82.7 (28.2)	77.3 (25.2)	66.1 (18.9)	53.9 (12.2)	43.8 (6.6)	63.4 (17.4)
Daily mean °F (°C)	30.8 (−0.7)	33.4 (0.8)	41.3 (5.2)	52.0 (11.1)	60.9 (16.1)	68.8 (20.4)	72.5 (22.5)	71.3 (21.8)	65.2 (18.4)	53.7 (12.1)	42.7 (5.9)	35.2 (1.8)	52.3 (11.3)
Mean daily minimum °F (°C)	21.9 (−5.6)	23.5 (−4.7)	29.9 (−1.2)	38.7 (3.7)	48.7 (9.3)	57.5 (14.2)	61.7 (16.5)	60.0 (15.6)	53.1 (11.7)	41.3 (5.2)	31.6 (−0.2)	26.5 (−3.1)	41.2 (5.1)
Mean minimum °F (°C)	−0.4 (−18.0)	3.7 (−15.7)	12.1 (−11.1)	22.4 (−5.3)	32.3 (0.2)	44.1 (6.7)	51.5 (10.8)	49.7 (9.8)	39.1 (3.9)	26.9 (−2.8)	16.6 (−8.6)	9.0 (−12.8)	−3.5 (−19.7)
Record low °F (°C)	−31 (−35)	−22 (−30)	−13 (−25)	9 (−13)	21 (−6)	31 (−1)	38 (3)	35 (2)	24 (−4)	15 (−9)	−1 (−18)	−22 (−30)	−31 (−35)
Average precipitation inches (mm)	3.39 (86)	3.20 (81)	4.29 (109)	3.70 (94)	4.95 (126)	4.91 (125)	5.33 (135)	3.71 (94)	3.87 (98)	3.27 (83)	3.12 (79)	3.65 (93)	47.39 (1,204)
Average snowfall inches (cm)	9.0 (23)	6.3 (16)	4.1 (10)	0.2 (0.51)	0.0 (0.0)	0.0 (0.0)	0.0 (0.0)	0.0 (0.0)	0.0 (0.0)	0.0 (0.0)	0.5 (1.3)	4.1 (10)	24.2 (61)
Average precipitation days (≥ 0.01 in)	14.1	13.3	14.3	14.2	15.1	12.6	13.2	10.8	9.6	10.6	11.3	14.0	153.1
Average snowy days (≥ 0.1 in)	6.5	5.0	2.2	0.2	0.0	0.0	0.0	0.0	0.0	0.0	0.7	3.5	18.1
Source: NOAA

== Demographics ==
Historical population
Census	Pop.	Note	%±
1860	196		—
1870	143		−27.0%
1880	226		58.0%
1890	431		90.7%
1900	737		71.0%
1910	1,224		66.1%
1920	1,765		44.2%
1930	2,493		41.2%
1940	2,497		0.2%
1950	2,587		3.6%
1960	2,660		2.8%
1970	2,271		−14.6%
1980	2,799		23.2%
1990	2,279		−18.6%
2000	2,352		3.2%
2010	2,322		−1.3%
2020	2,063		−11.2%
2021 (est.)	2,038		−1.2%
U.S. Decennial Census

=== 2020 census ===
As of the 2020 census, Spencer had a population of 2,063. The median age was 44.4 years. 19.9% of residents were under the age of 18 and 22.3% of residents were 65 years of age or older. For every 100 females there were 88.2 males, and for every 100 females age 18 and over there were 84.0 males age 18 and over.

0.0% of residents lived in urban areas, while 100.0% lived in rural areas.

There were 912 households in Spencer, of which 25.8% had children under the age of 18 living in them. Of all households, 31.6% were married-couple households, 20.3% were households with a male householder and no spouse or partner present, and 37.9% were households with a female householder and no spouse or partner present. About 37.5% of all households were made up of individuals and 19.2% had someone living alone who was 65 years of age or older.

There were 1,083 housing units, of which 15.8% were vacant. The homeowner vacancy rate was 3.5% and the rental vacancy rate was 13.0%.

Racial composition as of the 2020 census
Race	Number	Percent
White	1,933	93.7%
Black or African American	7	0.3%
American Indian and Alaska Native	2	0.1%
Asian	12	0.6%
Native Hawaiian and Other Pacific Islander	0	0.0%
Some other race	11	0.5%
Two or more races	98	4.8%
Hispanic or Latino (of any race)	24	1.2%

=== 2010 census ===
As of the census of 2010, there were 2,322 people, 1,005 households, and 578 families living in the city. The population density was 1,842.9 inhabitants per square mile (711.5/km^{2}). There were 1,180 housing units at an average density of 936.5 per square mile (361.6/km^{2}). The racial makeup of the city was 97.5% White, 0.1% Native American, 0.3% Asian, 0.6% from other races, and 1.5% from two or more races. Hispanic or Latino of any race were 1.7% of the population.

There were 1,005 households, of which 28.3% had children under the age of 18 living with them, 38.5% were married couples living together, 13.6% had a female householder with no husband present, 5.4% had a male householder with no wife present, and 42.5% were non-families. 37.6% of all households were made up of individuals, and 17.7% had someone living alone who was 65 years of age or older. The average household size was 2.25 and the average family size was 2.94.

The median age in the city was 40.2 years. 23.2% of residents were under the age of 18; 8.5% were between the ages of 18 and 24; 23.5% were from 25 to 44; 26.3% were from 45 to 64; and 18.5% were 65 years of age or older. The gender makeup of the city was 46.7% male and 53.3% female.

=== 2000 census ===
As of the census of 2000, there were 2,352 people, 1,005 households, and 614 families living in the city. The population density was 1,984.3 people per square mile (763.1/km^{2}). There were 1,154 housing units at an average density of 973.6 per square mile (374.4/km^{2}). The racial makeup of the city was 97.62% White, 0.13% African American, 0.21% Native American, 0.68% Asian, 0.04% from other races, and 1.32% from two or more races. Hispanic or Latino of any race were 0.77% of the population.

There were 1,005 households, out of which 27.6% had children under the age of 18 living with them, 44.2% were married couples living together, 12.9% had a female householder with no husband present, and 38.9% were non-families. 35.0% of all households were made up of individuals, and 19.8% had someone living alone who was 65 years of age or older. The average household size was 2.25 and the average family size was 2.89.

In the city, the population was spread out, with 23.9% under the age of 18, 8.3% from 18 to 24, 23.6% from 25 to 44, 22.1% from 45 to 64, and 22.2% who were 65 years of age or older. The median age was 41 years. For every 100 females there were 86.1 males. For every 100 females age 18 and over, there were 80.6 males.

The median income for a household in the city was $19,773, and the median income for a family was $28,500. Males had a median income of $28,000 versus $16,452 for females. The per capita income for the city was $12,976. About 24.9% of families and 31.0% of the population were below the poverty line, including 42.8% of those under age 18 and 21.4% of those age 65 or over.

== Notable people ==
- Ruby Bradley, Colonel, U.S. Army, 1907–2002
- Derek Hardman, Offensive tackle for the National Football League's Detroit Lions
- Deborah Hersman, chairperson, National Transportation Safety Board from 2009 to 2014
- Larry Starcher, retired Justice of the West Virginia Supreme Court
- Riley Keaton, member of the West Virginia House of Delegates

== Media ==
=== Radio ===
- WYRC-LP, Grade School (K-12) - 92.3 FM
- WVRC-FM, Country - 104.7 FM
- WMCC-LP, Religious (3ABN Radio) - 105.7 FM
- WVRC-AM, Gospel Music - 1400 AM
