= Roane County, West Virginia =

County in West Virginia, United States

- County
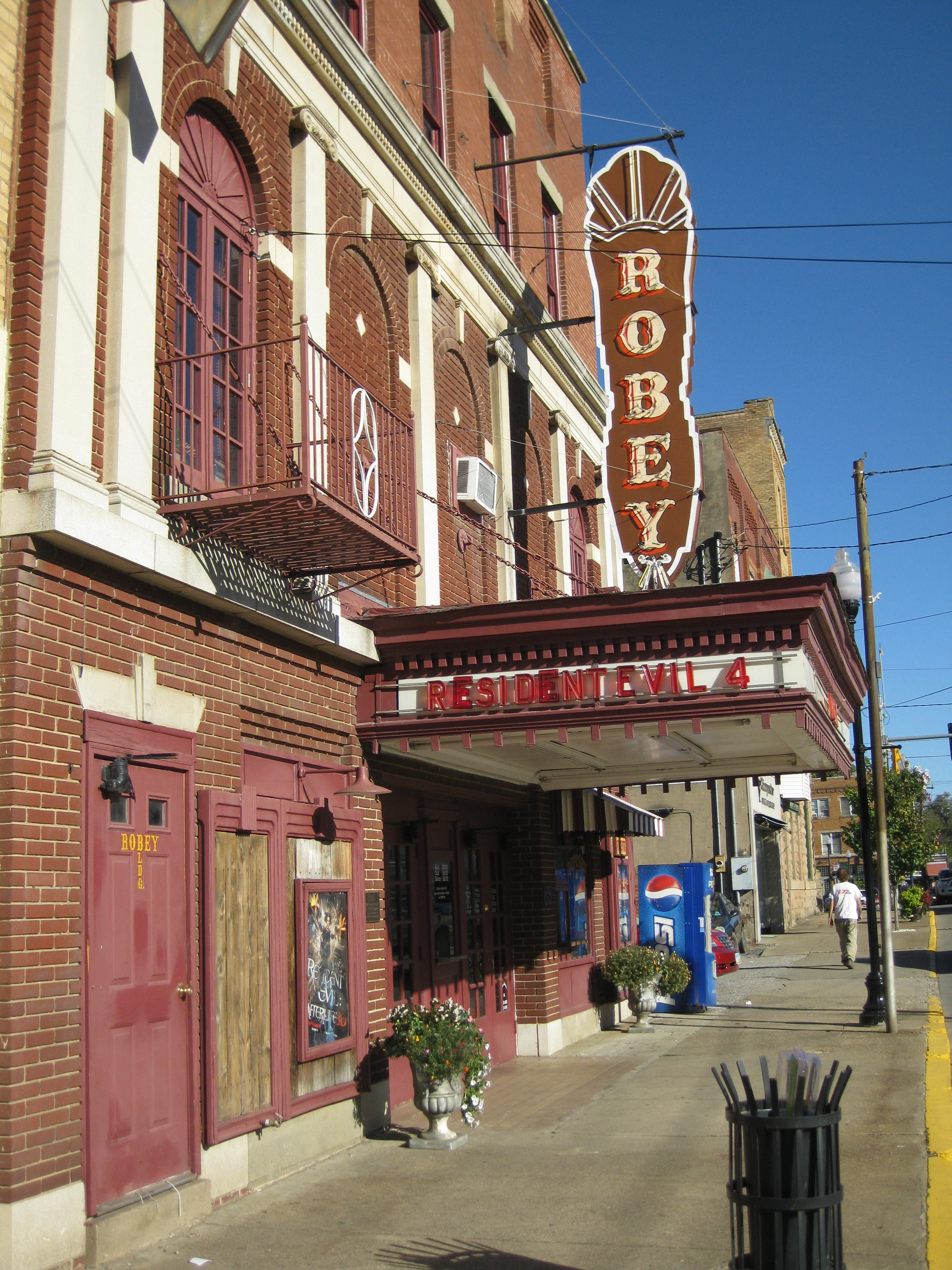
- Robey Theatre in Spencer

- Flag

- Location within the U.S. state of West Virginia
- Coordinates: 38°43′N 81°22′W
- Country: United States
- State: West Virginia
- Founded: March 11, 1856
- Named for: Spencer Roane
- Seat: Spencer
- Largest city: Spencer

Area
  - Total: 484 sq mi (1,250 km^{2})
  - Land: 484 sq mi (1,250 km^{2})
  - Water: 0.2 sq mi (0.52 km^{2}) 0.03%

Population (2020)
  - Total: 14,028
  - Estimate (2025): 13,317 ▼
  - Density: 29.0/sq mi (11.2/km^{2})
- Time zone: UTC−5 (Eastern)
  - Summer (DST): UTC−4 (EDT)
- Congressional district: 1st
- Website: www.roanewv.com

Roane County is a county located in the U.S. state of West Virginia. As of the 2020 census, the population was 14,028. Its county seat is Spencer. The county was founded in 1856 and is named for Spencer Roane.

== History ==
Roane County was created by an act of the Virginia General Assembly on March 11, 1856. It was named for the jurist Spencer Roane of Virginia. He was born in Essex County April 4, 1762. The county's seat Spencer was also named for Judge Roane.

On June 20, 1863, at the height of the Civil War, Roane was one of fifty Virginia counties that were admitted to the Union as the state of West Virginia. Later that year, the state's counties were divided into civil townships, with the intention of encouraging local government. This proved impractical in the heavily rural state, and in 1872 the townships were converted into magisterial districts. Roane County was divided into seven districts: Curtis, Geary, Harper, Reedy, Smithfield, Spencer, and Walton. Except for minor adjustments, these districts were largely unchanged for more than a century, until in the 1980s they were consolidated into three new magisterial districts: Northern, Eastern, and Western. A fourth district, Southern, was added in the 1990s.

== Geography ==
According to the United States Census Bureau, the county has a total area of 484 square miles (1,250 km^{2}), of which 484 square miles (1,250 km^{2}) is land and 0.2 square miles (0.52 km^{2}) (0.03%) is water.

=== Major highways ===
- Interstate 79
- U.S. Highway 33
- U.S. Highway 119
- West Virginia Route 14
- West Virginia Route 36

=== Adjacent counties ===
- Wirt County (north)
- Calhoun County (east)
- Clay County (southeast)
- Kanawha County (south)
- Jackson County (west)

== Demographics ==
Historical population
| Census | Pop. | Note | %± |
|---|---|---|---|
| 1860 | 5,381 | | — |
| 1870 | 7,232 | | 34.4% |
| 1880 | 12,184 | | 68.5% |
| 1890 | 15,303 | | 25.6% |
| 1900 | 19,852 | | 29.7% |
| 1910 | 21,543 | | 8.5% |
| 1920 | 20,129 | | −6.6% |
| 1930 | 19,478 | | −3.2% |
| 1940 | 20,787 | | 6.7% |
| 1950 | 18,408 | | −11.4% |
| 1960 | 15,720 | | −14.6% |
| 1970 | 14,111 | | −10.2% |
| 1980 | 15,952 | | 13.0% |
| 1990 | 15,120 | | −5.2% |
| 2000 | 15,446 | | 2.2% |
| 2010 | 14,926 | | −3.4% |
| 2020 | 14,028 | | −6.0% |
| 2025 (est.) | 13,317 | ▼ | −5.1% |
U.S. Decennial Census; 1790–1960 1900–1990; 1990–2000 2010–2020

=== 2020 census ===
As of the 2020 census, the county had a population of 14,028. Of the residents, 20.6% were under the age of 18 and 22.6% were 65 years of age or older; the median age was 46.3 years. For every 100 females there were 99.2 males, and for every 100 females age 18 and over there were 98.2 males.

The racial makeup of the county was 94.8% White, 0.3% Black or African American, 0.2% American Indian and Alaska Native, 0.3% Asian, 0.3% from some other race, and 4.1% from two or more races. Hispanic or Latino residents of any race comprised 1.1% of the population.

There were 5,922 households in the county, of which 26.4% had children under the age of 18 living with them and 25.1% had a female householder with no spouse or partner present. About 29.7% of all households were made up of individuals and 14.1% had someone living alone who was 65 years of age or older.

There were 7,151 housing units, of which 17.2% were vacant. Among occupied housing units, 77.1% were owner-occupied and 22.9% were renter-occupied. The homeowner vacancy rate was 1.6% and the rental vacancy rate was 9.0%.

Roane County, West Virginia – Racial and ethnic composition Note: the US Census treats Hispanic/Latino as an ethnic category. This table excludes Latinos from the racial categories and assigns them to a separate category. Hispanics/Latinos may be of any race.
| Race / Ethnicity (NH = Non-Hispanic) | Pop 2000 | Pop 2010 | Pop 2020 | % 2000 | % 2010 | % 2020 |
|---|---|---|---|---|---|---|
| White alone (NH) | 15,144 | 14,613 | 13,231 | 98.04% | 97.90% | 94.32% |
| Black or African American alone (NH) | 34 | 19 | 35 | 0.22% | 0.13% | 0.25% |
| Native American or Alaska Native alone (NH) | 32 | 25 | 28 | 0.21% | 0.17% | 0.20% |
| Asian alone (NH) | 35 | 38 | 38 | 0.23% | 0.25% | 0.27% |
| Pacific Islander alone (NH) | 0 | 1 | 0 | 0.00% | 0.01% | 0.00% |
| Other race alone (NH) | 5 | 3 | 9 | 0.03% | 0.02% | 0.06% |
| Mixed race or Multiracial (NH) | 92 | 124 | 535 | 0.60% | 0.83% | 3.81% |
| Hispanic or Latino (any race) | 104 | 103 | 152 | 0.67% | 0.69% | 1.08% |
| Total | 15,446 | 14,926 | 14,028 | 100.00% | 100.00% | 100.00% |

=== 2010 census ===
As of the 2010 United States census, there were 14,926 people, 6,195 households, and 4,193 families living in the county. The population density was 30.9 inhabitants per square mile (11.9/km^{2}). There were 7,351 housing units at an average density of 15.2 per square mile (5.9/km^{2}). The racial makeup of the county was 98.4% white, 0.3% Asian, 0.2% American Indian, 0.1% black or African American, 0.2% from other races, and 0.9% from two or more races. Those of Hispanic or Latino origin made up 0.7% of the population. In terms of ancestry, 20.7% were American, 17.9% were Irish, 15.3% were German, and 9.1% were English.

Of the 6,195 households, 28.9% had children under the age of 18 living with them, 53.2% were married couples living together, 9.9% had a female householder with no husband present, 32.3% were non-families, and 27.2% of all households were made up of individuals. The average household size was 2.39 and the average family size was 2.89. The median age was 43.5 years.

The median income for a household in the county was $27,428 and the median income for a family was $35,289. Males had a median income of $32,106 versus $22,914 for females. The per capita income for the county was $15,103. About 21.5% of families and 27.6% of the population were below the poverty line, including 41.5% of those under age 18 and 15.5% of those age 65 or over.

=== 2000 census ===
As of the census of 2000, there were 15,446 people, 6,161 households, and 4,479 families living in the county. The population density was 32 people per square mile (12 people/km^{2}). There were 7,360 housing units at an average density of 15 per square mile (5.8/km^{2}). The racial makeup of the county was 98.56% White, 0.22% Black or African American, 0.21% Native American, 0.23% Asian, 0.19% from other races, and 0.60% from two or more races. 0.67% of the population were Hispanic or Latino of any race.

There were 6,161 households, out of which 30.70% had children under the age of 18 living with them, 59.10% were married couples living together, 9.30% had a female householder with no husband present, and 27.30% were non-families. 23.50% of all households were made up of individuals, and 11.90% had someone living alone who was 65 years of age or older. The average household size was 2.49 and the average family size was 2.91.

In the county, the population was spread out, with 23.40% under the age of 18, 8.70% from 18 to 24, 26.60% from 25 to 44, 26.50% from 45 to 64, and 14.80% who were 65 years of age or older. The median age was 40 years. For every 100 females there were 98.00 males. For every 100 females age 18 and over, there were 96.00 males.

The median income for a household in the county was $24,511, and the median income for a family was $29,280. Males had a median income of $28,738 versus $17,207 for females. The per capita income for the county was $13,195. About 17.80% of families and 22.60% of the population were below the poverty line, including 32.10% of those under age 18 and 15.50% of those age 65 or over.

== Politics ==
United States presidential election results for Roane County, West Virginia
| Year | Republican | | Democratic | | Third party(ies) | |
| Year | No. | % | No. | % | No. | % |
|---|---|---|---|---|---|---|
| 1912 | 708 | 15.82% | 2,045 | 45.70% | 1,722 | 38.48% |
| 1916 | 2,406 | 51.97% | 2,186 | 47.21% | 38 | 0.82% |
| 1920 | 4,232 | 57.78% | 3,082 | 42.08% | 10 | 0.14% |
| 1924 | 4,097 | 53.90% | 3,504 | 46.10% | 0 | 0.00% |
| 1928 | 4,472 | 59.54% | 3,007 | 40.03% | 32 | 0.43% |
| 1932 | 4,361 | 46.12% | 5,094 | 53.88% | 0 | 0.00% |
| 1936 | 5,282 | 51.08% | 5,047 | 48.81% | 12 | 0.12% |
| 1940 | 5,317 | 50.76% | 5,158 | 49.24% | 0 | 0.00% |
| 1944 | 4,650 | 55.11% | 3,787 | 44.89% | 0 | 0.00% |
| 1948 | 4,213 | 53.28% | 3,684 | 46.59% | 11 | 0.14% |
| 1952 | 4,922 | 57.74% | 3,603 | 42.26% | 0 | 0.00% |
| 1956 | 4,701 | 59.85% | 3,153 | 40.15% | 0 | 0.00% |
| 1960 | 4,443 | 57.53% | 3,280 | 42.47% | 0 | 0.00% |
| 1964 | 3,451 | 47.46% | 3,820 | 52.54% | 0 | 0.00% |
| 1968 | 3,851 | 55.70% | 2,639 | 38.17% | 424 | 6.13% |
| 1972 | 4,253 | 64.06% | 2,386 | 35.94% | 0 | 0.00% |
| 1976 | 3,216 | 47.75% | 3,519 | 52.25% | 0 | 0.00% |
| 1980 | 3,219 | 54.07% | 2,498 | 41.96% | 236 | 3.96% |
| 1984 | 3,751 | 60.11% | 2,468 | 39.55% | 21 | 0.34% |
| 1988 | 2,861 | 53.66% | 2,447 | 45.89% | 24 | 0.45% |
| 1992 | 2,207 | 37.68% | 2,607 | 44.51% | 1,043 | 17.81% |
| 1996 | 2,069 | 39.19% | 2,572 | 48.71% | 639 | 12.10% |
| 2000 | 3,172 | 56.39% | 2,332 | 41.46% | 121 | 2.15% |
| 2004 | 3,440 | 56.39% | 2,612 | 42.82% | 48 | 0.79% |
| 2008 | 2,943 | 52.78% | 2,511 | 45.03% | 122 | 2.19% |
| 2012 | 2,982 | 58.93% | 1,939 | 38.32% | 139 | 2.75% |
| 2016 | 3,781 | 71.12% | 1,222 | 22.99% | 313 | 5.89% |
| 2020 | 4,213 | 73.10% | 1,455 | 25.25% | 95 | 1.65% |
| 2024 | 4,189 | 75.87% | 1,218 | 22.06% | 114 | 2.06% |

== Communities ==
=== City ===
- Spencer (county seat)

=== Town ===
- Reedy

=== Magisterial districts ===
==== Current ====
- Northern
- Southern
- Eastern
- Western

==== Historic ====
- Curtis
- Geary
- Harper
- Reedy
- Smithfield
- Spencer
- Walton

=== Unincorporated communities ===
- Amma
- Billings
- Cotton
- Elana
- Gandeeville
- Lattimer
- Left Hand
- Linden
- Looneyville
- Peniel
- Walton
- Newton

== Notable inhabitants ==
- William Franklin "Frank" George (1928-2017), old-time fiddler and folklorist

== See also ==
- Roane County Schools
- National Register of Historic Places listings in Roane County, West Virginia
