= Clifftop =

A clifftop is the area of land at the top of a cliff. It may also refer to:

- Clifftop, Fayette County, West Virginia
- Clifftop, Raleigh County, West Virginia

== See also ==
- Appalachian String Band Music Festival (often referred to simply as "Clifftop"), held each August in Clifftop, Fayette County, West Virginia
- Cliff-top dune
