= Marcus Martin =

Marcus Martin may refer to:

- Marcus Martin (cricketer) (1842–1908), English first-class cricketer
- Marcus Martin (fiddler) (1881–1974), American fiddler
- Marcus Martin (architect) (1893–1981), Australian architect
- Marcus Martin (American football) (born 1993), American former professional football

== See also ==
- Marcos Martín (disambiguation), several people
- Marcos Martins (born 1989), Brazilian footballer
