= Music of West Virginia =

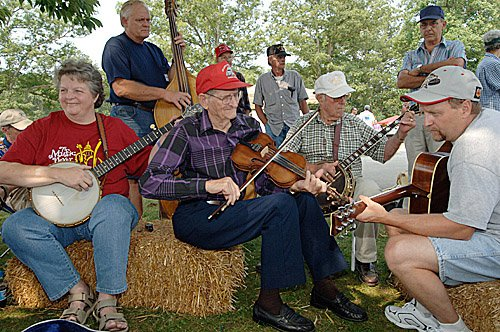
Clifftop Masters - two generations of old time music masters

West Virginia's folk heritage is a part of the Appalachian folk music tradition, and includes styles of fiddling, ballad singing, and other styles that draw on Ulster-Scots music.

West Virginia consists of a mostly rural region, although its few relatively urban centers are prominent spots of musical innovation. The Capitol Music Hall, in Wheeling, is the oldest performing place of its kind in the state, and has hosted a wide variety of acts, from national tours to the local Wheeling Symphony Orchestra.

Other music institutions in West Virginia include the Mountaineer Opera House in Milton. The West Virginia Symphony Orchestra was founded in 1939, as the Charleston Civic Orchestra, before becoming the Charleston Symphony Orchestra in 1943. The first conductor was William R. Wiant, followed by the prominent conductor Antonio Modarelli, of the Wheeling Symphony Orchestra.

The town of Glenville has long been home to the annual West Virginia State Folk Festival.

== Music history ==
West Virginia's historical contributions to musical development include WWVA Jamboree, a radio show that began in 1933 and soon became a very prominent regional show, based out of the Capitol Music Hall in Wheeling. WWVA, the radio station that has long broadcast WWVA Jamboree, hosts the Jamboree in the Hills every July in St. Clairsville, Ohio, just across the border from Wheeling.

The town of Oak Hill was the site of country legend Hank Williams' death, which is commemorated by a plaque in front of the public library in Oak Hill.

Daniel Johnston, born in California, grew up in New Cumberland.

== Music festivals ==
- All Good Music Festival, Masontown
- Appalachian String Band Festival, Clifftop
- CMC's Food Truck Frenzy & Festival, Princeton
- Diamond Teeth Mary Music Festival, Huntington
- Dvorak/Gershwin Black History Month Festival, Charleston
- Gazette-Mail Kanawha County Majorette and Band Festival, Charleston
- Elkhenge Music Festival, East Dailey
- Festivall Charleston, Charleston
- Gardner Winter Music Festival, Morgantown
- Heritage Music Blues Fest, Wheeling
- Mountain Stage NewSong Festival, Charles Town
- PattyFest, Morgantown
- Robin Kessinger Festival & WV State Flatpick Guitar Championship, Gandeeville
- Stonewall Jackson Heritage Arts & Crafts Jubilee, Weston
- Upper Potomac Dulcimer Fest, Shepherdstown
- Vandalia Gathering, Charleston
- West Virginia State Folk Festival, Glenville
- West Virginia Independent Music Festival, Logan

== Notable musicians ==
- Hasil Adkins, rockabilly musician
- Elbern Alkire, Hawaiian guitar
- Cuba Austin, jazz drummer
- Leon "Chu" Berry, jazz saxophonist
- Charles Blevins, West Virginia folk music musician
- Andy Boarman, banjo and autoharp player
- Byzantine, melodic death metal band
- Mark Carman, gospel, country Grammy-nominated producer, musician, songwriter
- Tyler Childers, folk/country/Americana singer
- Wilma Lee Cooper and Stoney Cooper, country
- Billy Cox, bassist for Jimi Hendrix
- George Crumb, composer
- Hazel Dickens, bluegrass singer from Mercer County
- Little Jimmy Dickens, country singer
- Sierra Ferrell, country musician
- Ed Haley, old-timey fiddler from Logan County
- Hawkshaw Hawkins, country singer
- Blind Joe Hill, blues singer, one-man band
- Frank Hutchison, country blues and Piedmont blues musician and songwriter
- Johnnie Johnson, piano player and blues musician
- Daniel Johnston, indie musician from Hancock County
- Dick Justice, blues and folk musician
- Musa Kaleem, jazz saxophonist and flautist
- Karma to Burn, progressive alternative-metal band
- The Lilly Brothers, bluegrass musicians
- The Love Coats, acoustic rock/pop
- Kathy Mattea, country singer
- Mind Garage, psychedelic rock
- Landau Eugene Murphy, Jr., jazz singer
- John & Emery McClung Brothers & old-time musicians ca. 1930
- Tex McGuire, old-time musician
- Tim O'Brien, bluegrass musician
- Mollie O'Brien, bluegrass, Americana
- Molly O'Day, pioneering country vocalist
- Brad Paisley, country singer and songwriter from Wheeling. Has had 5 #2 albums on the Billboard 200 from 2005 to 2014.
- Don Redman, jazz arranger and clarinetist
- Blind Alfred Reed, fiddler & composer
- Carl Rutherford, blues guitarist and singer from War, West Virginia
- Jim Savarino, singer/songwriter
- Art Simmons, jazz pianist
- Michael W. Smith, contemporary Christian music star
- Red Sovine, country
- Johnny Staats, bluegrass mandolin
- Eleanor Steber, operatic soprano
- Steve Whiteman, lead singer of Kix
- The Williamson Brothers, folk
- Garland Wilson, jazz pianist
- Melvin Wine, recipient of a National Heritage Fellowship
- Bill Withers, R&B musician, had a #1 Billboard Hot 100 hit with "Lean on Me" in 1972.
- Frankie Yankovic, polka musician
- Zao, metalcore band

== See also ==
- List of songs about West Virginia
