= Appalachian music =

Traditional music of the American Appalachian Mountains region

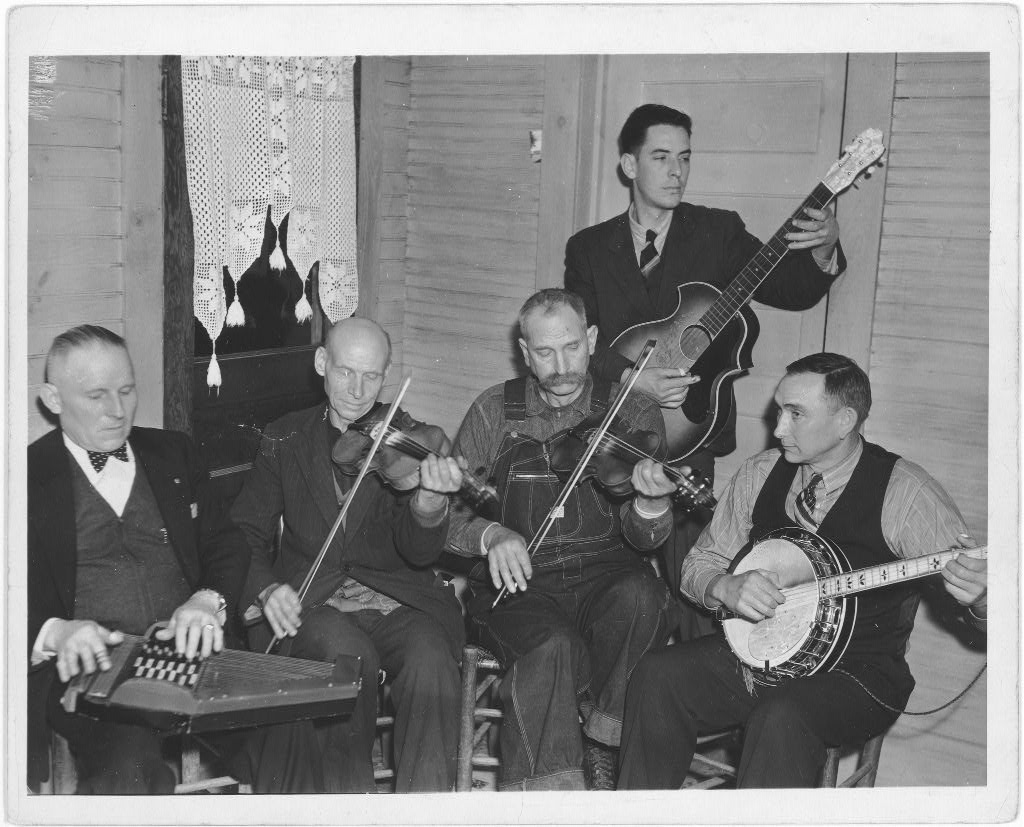
- Stylistic origins: Folk music (English, Scottish, Irish, Germanic), Spirituals
- Cultural origins: 18th century, Appalachia, United States
- Typical instruments: Fiddle, banjo, guitar, Appalachian dulcimer, autoharp
- Derivative forms: Bluegrass, country

Appalachian music is the music of the region of Appalachia in the Eastern United States. Traditional Appalachian music is derived from various influences, including the ballads, hymns and fiddle music of the British Isles (particularly Scotland), and to a lesser extent the music of Continental Europe.

First recorded in the 1920s, Appalachian musicians were a key influence on the early development of old-time music, country music, bluegrass, and rock n' roll, and were an important part of the American folk music revival of the 1960s. Instruments typically used to perform Appalachian music include the banjo, American fiddle, fretted dulcimer, and later the guitar.

Early recorded Appalachian musicians include Fiddlin' John Carson, G. B. Grayson & Henry Whitter, Bascom Lamar Lunsford, the Carter Family, Clarence Ashley, and Dock Boggs, all of whom were initially recorded in the 1920s and 1930s. Several Appalachian musicians obtained renown during the folk revival of the 1950s and 1960s, including Jean Ritchie, Roscoe Holcomb, Ola Belle Reed, Lily May Ledford, Hedy West and Doc Watson. Country and bluegrass artists such as Loretta Lynn, Roy Acuff, Dolly Parton, Earl Scruggs, Chet Atkins, The Stanley Brothers and Don Reno were heavily influenced by traditional Appalachian music.

== History ==
=== Anglo-Celtic Immigrants ===
Immigrants from Northern England, the Scottish lowlands, and Ulster arrived in Appalachia in the 17th and 18th centuries (with many from Ulster being "Ulster Scots", whose ancestors originated from parts of Southern Scotland and Northern England, including Cumberland), and brought with them the musical traditions of these regions, consisting primarily of English and Scottish ballads – which were essentially unaccompanied narratives – and dance music, such as reels, which were accompanied by a fiddle.

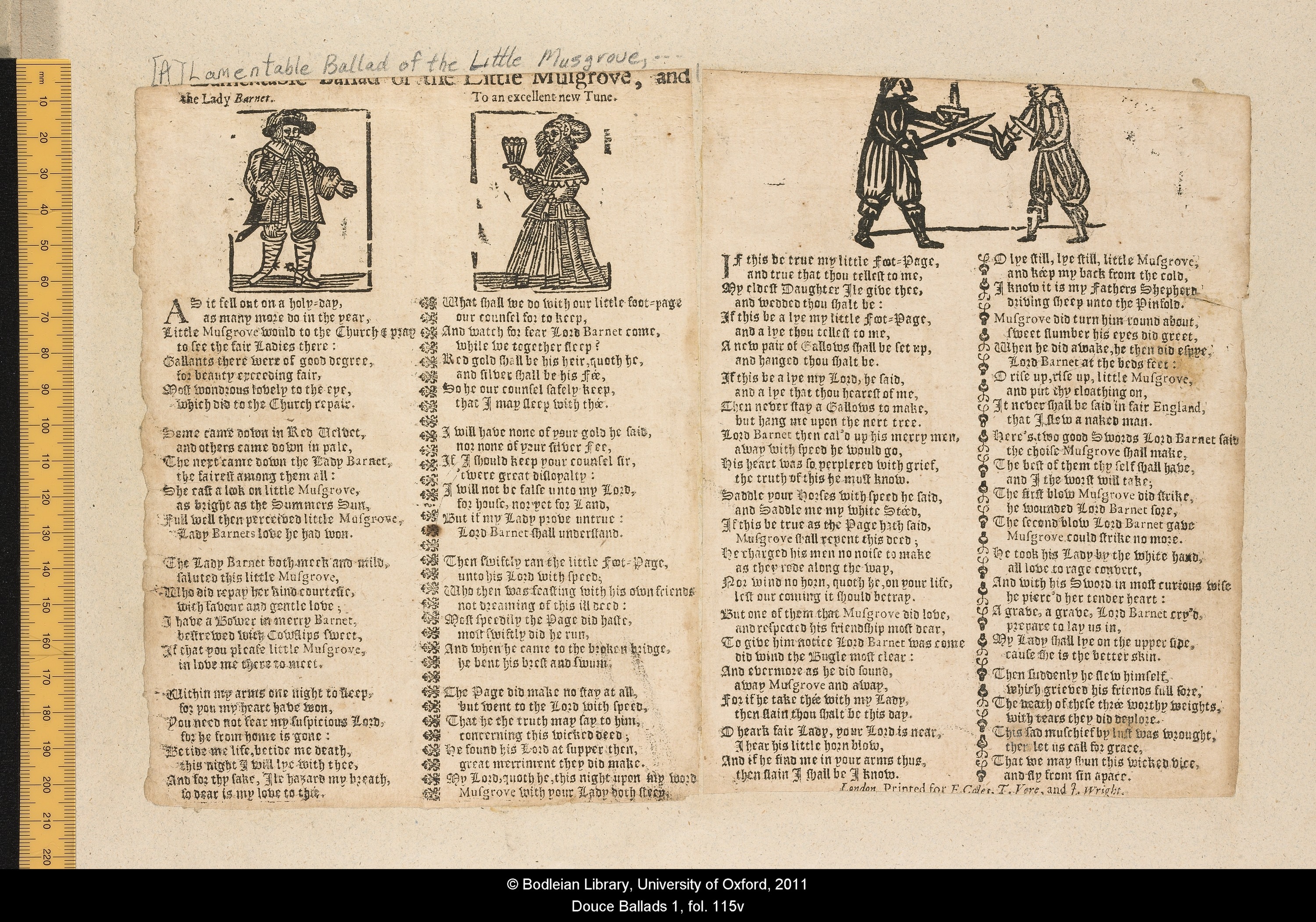
"A lamentable ballad of the little Musgrove", 17th century antecedent of "Matty Groves"

==== Ballads ====
Many Appalachian ballads, such as "Pretty Saro", "The Cuckoo", "Pretty Polly", and "Matty Groves", descend from the English ballad tradition and have known antecedents there. Other songs popular in Appalachia, such as "Young Hunting", "Lord Randal", and "Barbara Allen", have Scottish Lowlands roots. Many of these are versions of the famous Child Ballads, collected by Francis James Child in the nineteenth century. The dance tune "Cumberland Gap" may be derived from the tune that accompanies the Scottish ballad "Bonnie George Campbell". According to the musicologist Cecil Sharp the ballads of Appalachia, including their melodies, were generally most similar to those of "the North of England, or to the Lowlands, rather than the Highlands, of Scotland, as the country from which they [the people] originally migrated. For the Appalachian tunes...have far more affinity with the normal English folk-tune than with that of the Gaelic-speaking Highlander."

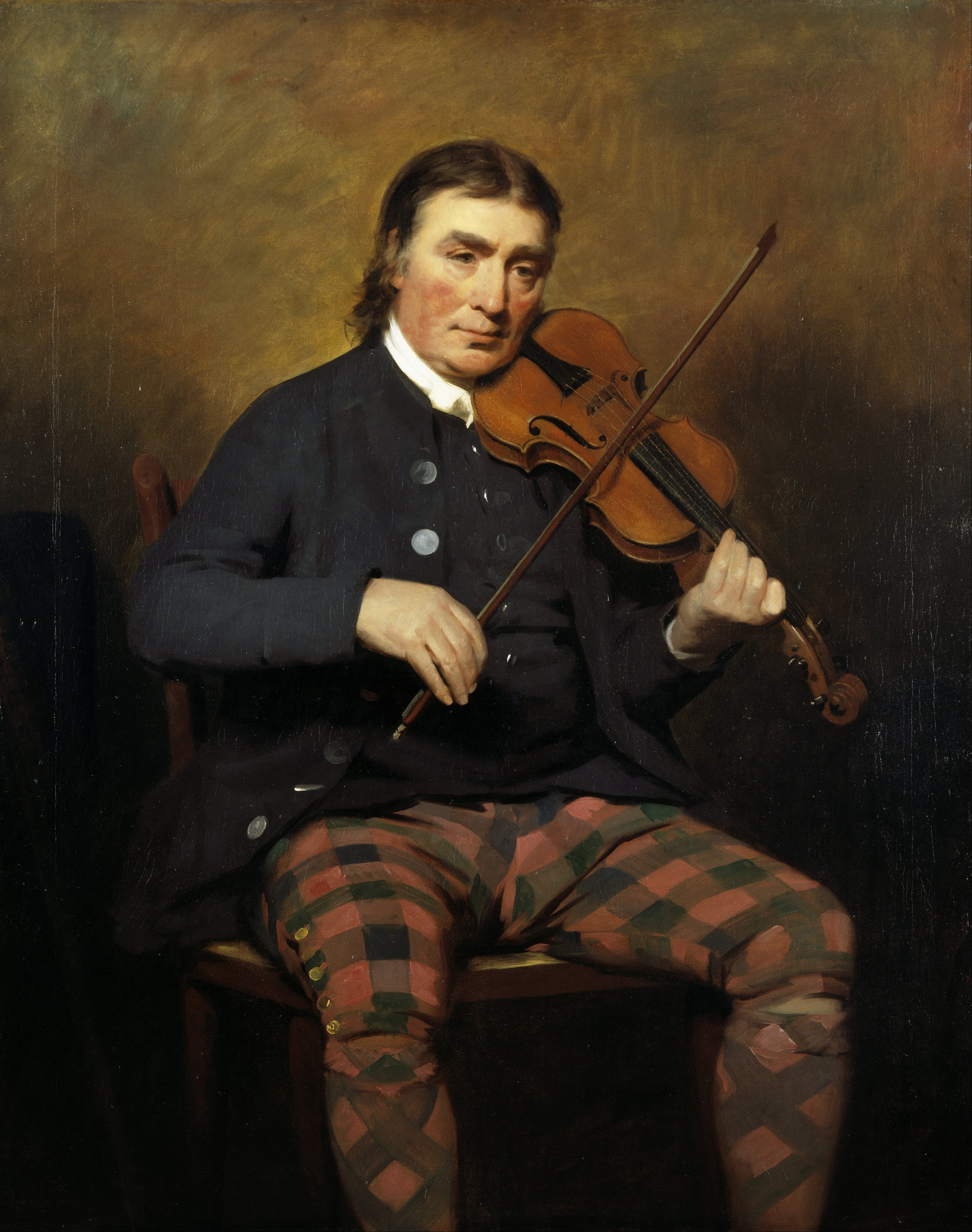
Scottish Fiddler Niel Gow

==== Fiddle tunes ====
Several Appalachian fiddle tunes have origins in Gaelic-speaking regions of Ireland and Scotland, for example "Leather Britches", based on "Lord MacDonald's Reel". These may have come to Appalachia via printed versions which were very popular throughout the British Empire in the eighteenth century, rather than directly from Gaelic areas. The style of the 18th century Scottish fiddler Niel Gow, which involved a powerful and rhythmic short bow sawstroke technique, is said to have become the foundation of Appalachian fiddling.

==== Church music ====
The early British immigrants also brought a form of church singing called lining out or calling out, in which one person sings a line of a psalm or hymn and the rest of the congregation responds. This type of congregational singing, once very common all over colonial America, is now largely restricted to Old Regular Baptist churches in the hills of southwest Virginia, southern West Virginia, and eastern Kentucky.

=== Continental Europeans ===
There were German, Polish and Czech cultural pockets in Appalachia as well as many Dutch and French Huguenot immigrants. These cultures largely assimilated, but some songs and melodies, for example the German "Fischer's Hornpipe", remained in the repertoires of their Americanized ancestors. A recording of the fiddler Tommy Jarrell playing "Fisher's Hornpipe" can be heard online.

The "Appalachian" or "mountain" dulcimer, thought to have been a modification of a Germanic instrument such as the scheitholt, (or possibly the Norwegian langeleik or the French épinette des Vosges) emerged in Southwest Pennsylvania and Northwest Virginia in the 19th century. In the early 20th century, settlement schools in Kentucky taught the fretted dulcimer to students, helping spread its popularity in the region. Jean Ritchie was largely responsible for popularizing the instrument among folk music enthusiasts in the 1950s.

Appalachian yodeling is thought to have entered the Appalachian mountains in the 18th century, brought by immigrants from Germany, Scandinavia and Switzerland, where it was generally used to communicate over longs distances in mountainous terrain similar to the Appalachians. Vocal feathering, practiced by singers including Doug Wallin and described as a "half-yodel", (or more accurately, according to Judith McCulloh, as 'A sudden or forceful raising of the soft palate against the back wall of the throat and/or a sudden closing of the glottis at the very end of a given note, generally accompanied by a rise in pitch'), may also be Germanic in origin.

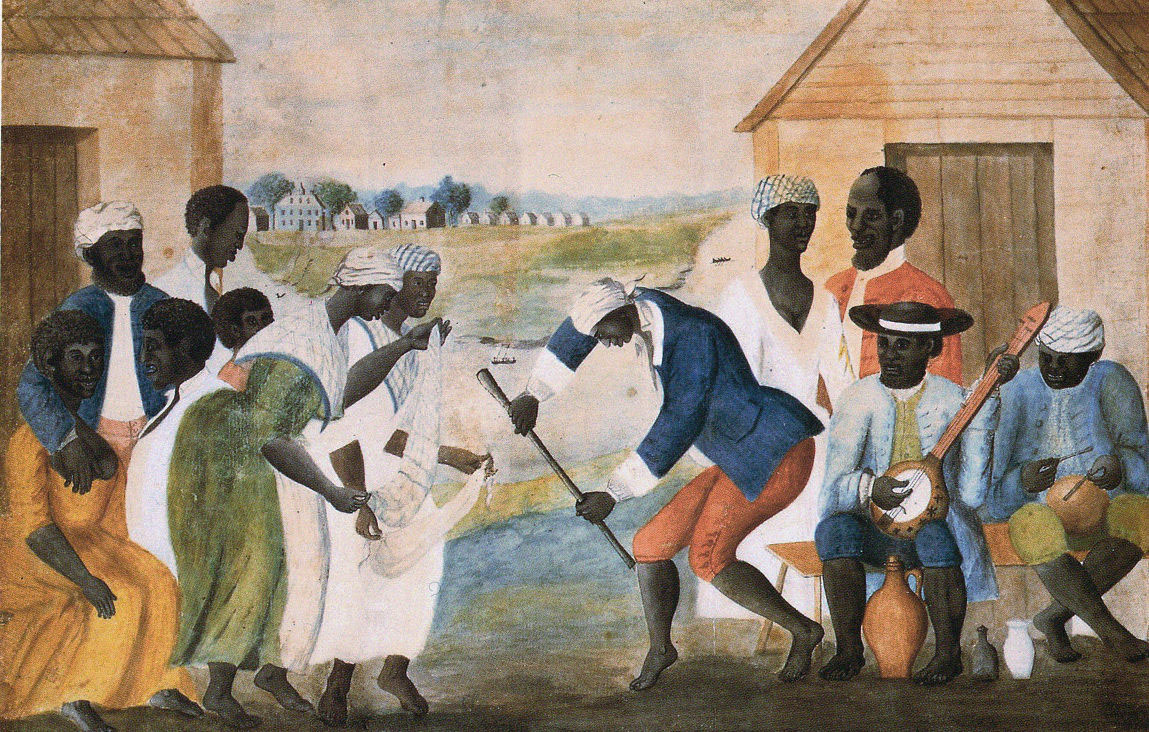
The Old Plantation, c.1790, shows African American slaves playing a banjo-like instrument, probably in Beaufort County, South Carolina.

=== Affrilachians ===
Affrilachians have had a profound impact on regional Appalachian music culture, partially owning to the fact that Affrilachians have been in the region for as long as the earliest Europeans. African musical traditional have influenced all Appalachian music styles; moreover, the blues is foundational to bluegrass and country music. Affrilachians also have distinct musical styles formed within their community, including Affrilachian styles of jazz and the blues.

The banjo has its origins in Africa and the African American community; the banjo now has many derivative forms, including the banjolin, among others. The washboard, which is played by using one's hands or thimble to stroke the riffs on the instrument, also has its origins in the African diaspora in the Americas. Washboards are used in place of drums to produce percussion sounds. The washtub bass, another instrument commonly found in Appalachian music, also originated in Affrilachian communities before being adopted by White string bands. Also known as the gutbucket, (or in other countries the "gas-tank bass" or "laundrophone"), it is usually made from a metal wash tub, a staff or stick, and sometimes four or more strings (though the vast majority of washtub basses use only one string). The bass may also have tuning pegs. Many Affrilachian and Black Southern instruments have used to stereotype African Americans, for example during minstrel shows.

=== Later developments ===
The "New World" ballad tradition, consisting of ballads written in North America, was as influential as the Old World tradition to the development of Appalachian music. New World ballads were typically written to reflect news events of the day, and were often published as broadsides. New World ballads popular among Appalachian musicians included "Omie Wise", "Wreck of the Old 97", "Man of Constant Sorrow", and "John Hardy". Later, coal mining and its associated labor issues led to the development of protest songs, such as "Which Side Are You On?" and "Coal Creek March".

Many ballad singers, such as Texas Gladden, acquired what is referred to as the "High Lonesome Sound", a strident, nasalized vocal timbre, often with an unmetered rhythm and the use of gapped (i.e. pentatonic) scales. It is unknown exactly when and how this style developed.

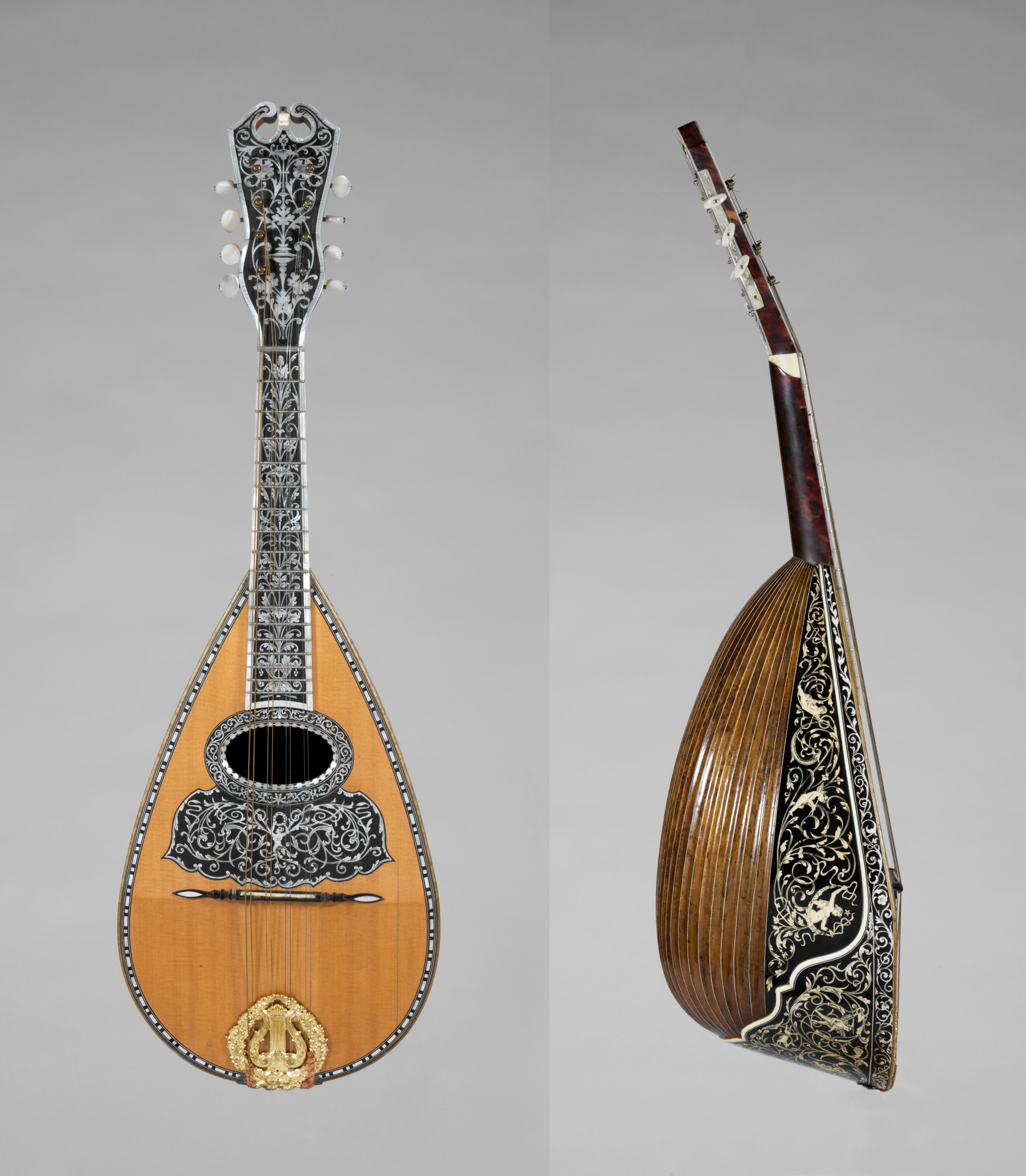
Mandolin

Instruments such as the guitar, mandolin, and autoharp became popular in Appalachia in the late 19th century as a result of mail order catalogs. These instruments were added to the banjo-and-fiddle outfits to form early string bands.

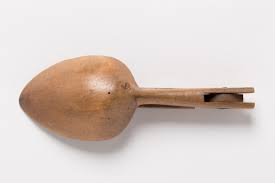
Spoon instrument

Other instruments include the spoons which are played by hitting two spoons together, making a 'click' sound which creates tempo.

== Collecting and recording ==
=== Fieldwork ===
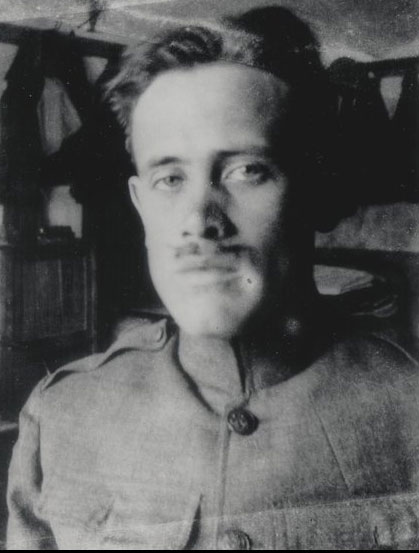
John Jacob Niles

Around the turn of the 20th century, a broad movement developed to record the rich musical heritage, particularly of folksong, that had been preserved and developed by the people of the Appalachians. This music was unwritten; songs were handed down, often within families, from generation to generation by oral transmission. Fieldwork to record Appalachian music (first in musical notation, later on with recording equipment) was undertaken by a variety of scholars.

One of the earliest collectors of Appalachian ballads was Kentucky native John Jacob Niles (1892–1980), who began noting ballads as early as 1907 as he learned them in the course of family, social life, and work. Due to fears of plagiarism and imitation of other collectors active in the region at the time, Niles waited until 1960 to publish his first 110 in The Ballad Book of John Jacob Niles. The area covered by Niles in his collecting days, according to the map in the Ballad Book, was bounded roughly by Tazewell, Virginia; south to Boone and Saluda, North Carolina and Greenville, South Carolina; west to Chickamauga, Georgia; north through Chattanooga and Dayton, Tennessee to Somerset, Kentucky; northwest to Bardstown, Frankfort, and Lexington, Kentucky; east to the West Virginia border, and back down to Tazewell, thus covering areas of the Smokies, the Cumberland Plateau, Upper Tennessee Valley, and the Lookout Mountain region.

In May 1916, the soprano Loraine Wyman and her pianist colleague Howard Brockway visited the Appalachians in eastern Kentucky, in a 300-mile walking trek to gather folk songs. They took their harvest back to New York, where they continued, with great success, their ongoing efforts in performing traditional folk songs to urban audiences.

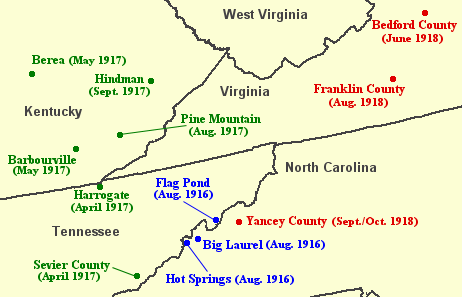
Map showing various locations in Central and Southern Appalachia where British folklorist Cecil Sharp collected "old world" ballads, 1916–1918

Starting only about a month after Wyman and Brockway, the British folklorists Cecil Sharp and Maud Karpeles toured the Southern Appalachian region, visiting places like Hot Springs in North Carolina, Flag Pond in Tennessee, Harlan in Kentucky, and Greenbrier County in West Virginia, as well as schools such as Berea College and the Hindman Settlement School in Kentucky and the Pi Beta Phi settlement school in Gatlinburg, Tennessee. They persisted for three summers in all (1916–1918), collecting over 200 "Old World" ballads in the region, many of which had varied only slightly from their British Isles counterparts. After their first study in Appalachia, Sharp and Karpeles published English Folk Songs from the Southern Appalachians.

Among the ballads Sharp and Karpeles found in Appalachia were medieval-themed songs such as "The Elfin Knight" and "Lord Thomas and Fair Ellinor", and seafaring and adventure songs such as "In Seaport Town" and "Young Beichan". They transcribed 16 versions of "Barbara Allen" and 22 versions of "The Daemon Lover" (often called "The House Carpenter" in Appalachia). The work of Sharp and Karpeles confirmed what many folklorists had suspected – the remote valleys and hollows of the Appalachian Mountains were a vast repository of older forms of music.

Later in the twentieth century, Jean Ritchie, Texas Gladden, Nimrod Workman, Frank Proffitt and Horton Barker and many others were recorded singing traditional songs and ballads learnt in the oral tradition.

=== Commercial recordings ===
John Brown's a-Hanging on a Sour Apple Tree
An example of the type of ethnographic recording collected; played by Virginia fiddler Henry Reed

Only a few years after folk music fieldwork had begun to flourish, the commercial recording industry had developed to the point that recording Appalachian music for popular consumption had become a viable enterprise.

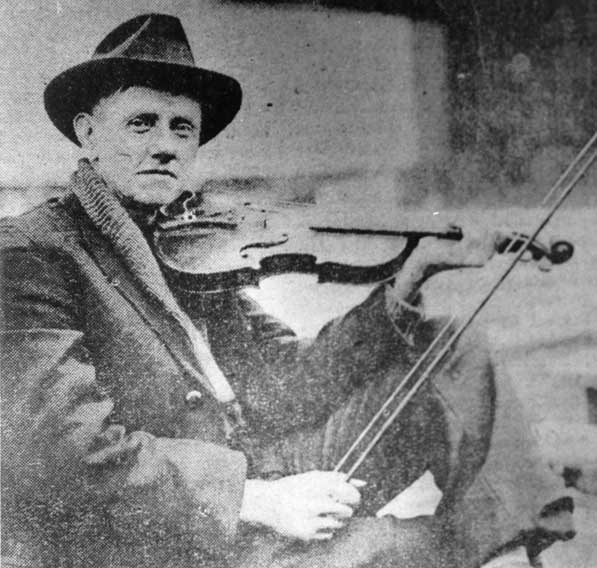
Fiddlin' John Carson

In 1923, OKeh Records talent scout Ralph Peer held the first recording sessions for Appalachian regional musicians in Atlanta, Georgia. Musicians recorded at these sessions included Fiddlin' John Carson, a champion fiddle player from North Georgia. The commercial success of the Atlanta sessions prompted OKeh to seek out other musicians from the region, including Henry Whitter, who was recorded in New York City in 1924. The following year, Peer recorded a North Carolina string band fronted by Al Hopkins that called themselves "a bunch of hillbillies". Peer applied the name to the band, and the success of the band's recordings led to the term "Hillbilly music" being applied to Appalachian string band music.

In 1927, Peer, then working for the Victor Talking Machine Company, held a series of recording sessions at Bristol, Tennessee that to many music historians mark the beginning of commercial country music. Musicians recorded at Bristol included the Carter Family and Jimmie Rodgers. Other record companies, such as Columbia Records and ARC, followed Peer's lead and held similar recording sessions. Many early Appalachian musicians, including Clarence Ashley and Dock Boggs, experienced a moderate level of success. The onset of the Great Depression in the early 1930s, however, reduced demand for recorded music, and most of these musicians fell back into obscurity.

=== Folk revival ===
In the 1930s, radio programs such as the Grand Ole Opry kept interest in Appalachian music alive, and collectors such as musicologist Alan Lomax continued to make field recordings in the region throughout the 1940s. In 1952, Folkways Records released the landmark Anthology of American Folk Music, which had been compiled by ethnomusicologist Harry Smith, and contained tracks from Appalachian musicians such as Clarence Ashley, Dock Boggs, and G. B. Grayson. The compilation helped inspire the folk music revival of the 1950s and 1960s. Urban folk enthusiasts such as New Lost City Ramblers bandmates Mike Seeger and John Cohen and producer Ralph Rinzler traveled to remote sections of Appalachia to conduct field recordings. Along with recording and re-recordings of older Appalachian musicians and the discovery of newer musicians, the folk revivalists conducted extensive interviews with these musicians to determine their musical backgrounds and the roots of their styles and repertoires. Appalachian musicians became regulars at folk music festivals from the Newport Folk Festival to folk festivals at the University of Chicago and the University of California at Berkeley. Films such as Cohen's High Lonesome Sound – the subject of which was Kentucky banjoist and ballad singer Roscoe Holcomb – helped give enthusiasts a sense of what it was like to see Appalachian musicians perform.

=== Coal mining and protest music ===
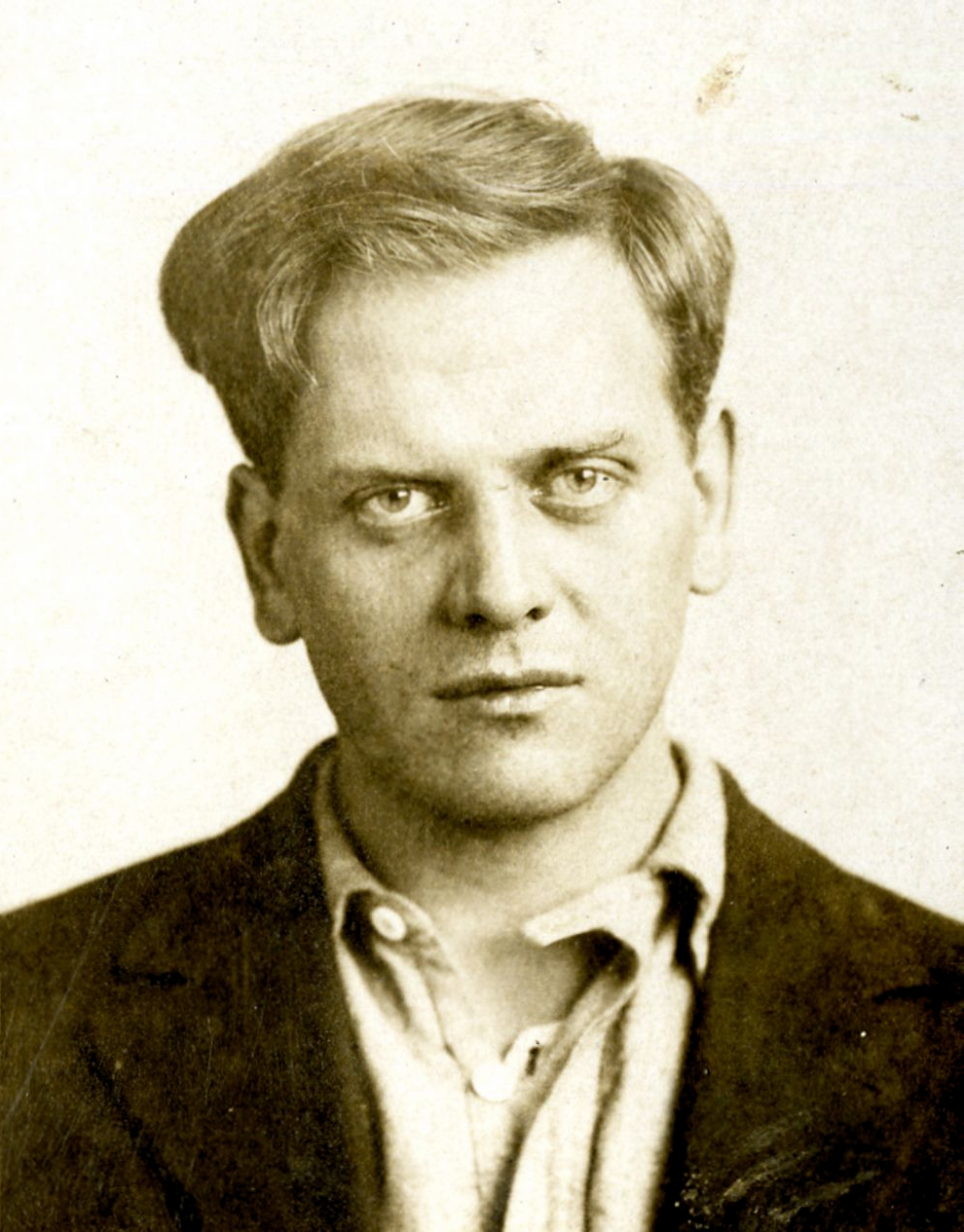
Ralph Chaplin

Large-scale coal mining arrived in Appalachia in the late 19th century, and brought drastic changes in the lives of those who chose to leave their small farms for wage-paying jobs in coal mining towns. The old ballad tradition that had existed in Appalachia since the arrival of Europeans in the region was readily applied to the social problems common in late 19th-century and early 20th-century mining towns – low pay, mine disasters, and strikes. One of the earliest mining-related songs from Appalachia was "Coal Creek March", which was influenced by the 1891 Coal Creek War in Anderson County, Tennessee. Mine labor strife in West Virginia in 1914 and the 1931 Harlan County War in Kentucky produced songs such as Ralph Chaplin's "Solidarity Forever" and Florence Reece's "Which Side Are You On?" respectively. George Korson made field recordings of miners' songs in 1940 for The Library of Congress. The most commercially successful Appalachian mining song is Merle Travis' "Sixteen Tons", which has been recorded by Tennessee Ernie Ford, Johnny Cash, and dozens of other artists. Other notable coal mining songs include Jean Ritchie's "The L&N Don't Stop Here Anymore", Sarah Ogan Gunning's "Come All You Coal Miners", and Hazel Dickens' "Clay County Miner". Both classic renditions and contemporary covers are included in Jack Wright's 2007 compilation album, Music of Coal.

In the 1990s companies working in the area started to use a new type of mining called Mountain Top Removal (MTR). Biblical associations of mountains as holy spaces informed feelings of upset at the desecration of Appalachian locals own nature and home. Many artists took to music as a way to express these feelings. Some example are Todd Burge's "What Would Moses Climb", Donna Price and Greg Treadway's "The Mountains of Home", Jean Ritchie's "Now Is the Cool of the Day", Shirley Stewart Burns's "Leave Those Mountains Down", and Rising Appalachia's "Scale Down". Many of the songs featured a cappella and string-band sounds to give them a traditional feel.

== Influence ==
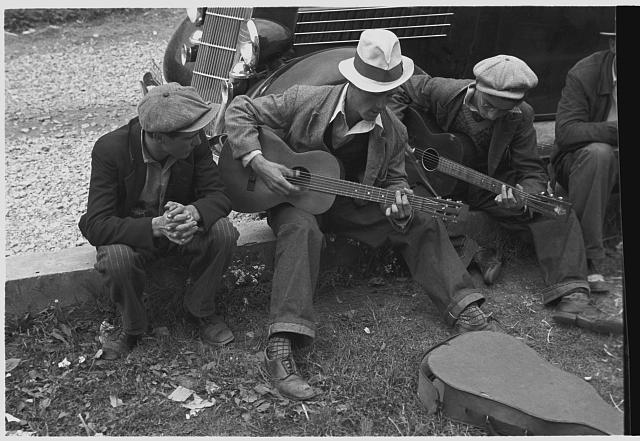
Street musicians in Maynardville, Tennessee, photographed by Ben Shahn in 1935

=== Country music ===
The Bristol sessions of 1927 have been called the "Big Bang of Country Music", as some music historians have considered them the beginning of the modern country music genre. The popularity of such musicians as the Carter Family, who first recorded at the sessions, proved to industry executives that there was a market for "mountain" or "hillbilly" music. Other influential 1920s-era location recording sessions in Appalachia were the Johnson City sessions and the Knoxville sessions. Early recorded country music (i.e., late 1920s and early 1930s) typically consisted of fiddle and banjo players and a predominant string band format, reflecting its Appalachian roots. Due in large part to the success of the Grand Ole Opry, the center of country music had shifted to Nashville by 1940. In subsequent decades, as the country music industry tried to move into the mainstream, musicians and industry executives sought to deemphasize the genre's Appalachian connections, most notably by dropping the term "hillbilly music" in favor of "country". In the late 1980s, artists such as Dolly Parton, Ricky Skaggs, and Dwight Yoakam helped to bring traditional Appalachian influences back to country music.

=== Bluegrass ===
Bluegrass developed in the 1940s from a mixture of several types of music, including old-time, country, and blues, but particularly mountain string bands, which in turn evolved from banjo-and-fiddle outfits. The music's creation is often credited to Bill Monroe and his band, the Blue Grass Boys. One of the defining characteristics of bluegrass – the fast-paced three-finger banjo picking style – was developed by Monroe's banjo player, North Carolina native Earl Scruggs. Later, as a member of Flatt and Scruggs and the Foggy Mountain Boys, Scruggs wrote Foggy Mountain Breakdown, one of the most well-known bluegrass instrumentals. Bluegrass quickly grew in popularity among numerous musicians in Appalachia, including the Stanley Brothers, the Osborne Brothers, and Jimmy Martin, and although it was influenced by various music forms from inside and outside the region (Monroe himself was from Western Kentucky), it is often associated with Appalachia and performed alongside old-time and traditional music at Appalachian folk festivals.

=== Popular music ===
Appalachian music has also influenced a number of musicians from outside the region. In 1957, British skiffle artist Lonnie Donegan reached the top of the U.K. charts with his version of the Appalachian folk song "Cumberland Gap", and the following year The Kingston Trio had a number one hit on the U.S. charts with their rendition of the North Carolina ballad, "Tom Dooley". Grateful Dead member Jerry Garcia frequently performed Appalachian songs such as "Shady Grove" and "Wind and Rain", and said he had learned the clawhammer banjo style from "listening to Clarence Ashley". Bob Dylan, who also performed a number of Appalachian folk songs, considered Roscoe Holcomb to be "one of the best", and guitarist Eric Clapton considered Holcomb a "favorite" country musician.

=== Classical music ===
Classical composers Lamar Stringfield and Kurt Weill have used Appalachian folk music in their compositions, and the region was the setting for Aaron Copland's Appalachian Spring.

=== Film ===
In the early 21st century, the motion picture O Brother, Where Art Thou?, and to a lesser extent Songcatcher and Cold Mountain, generated renewed mainstream interest in traditional Appalachian music.

== Festivals ==
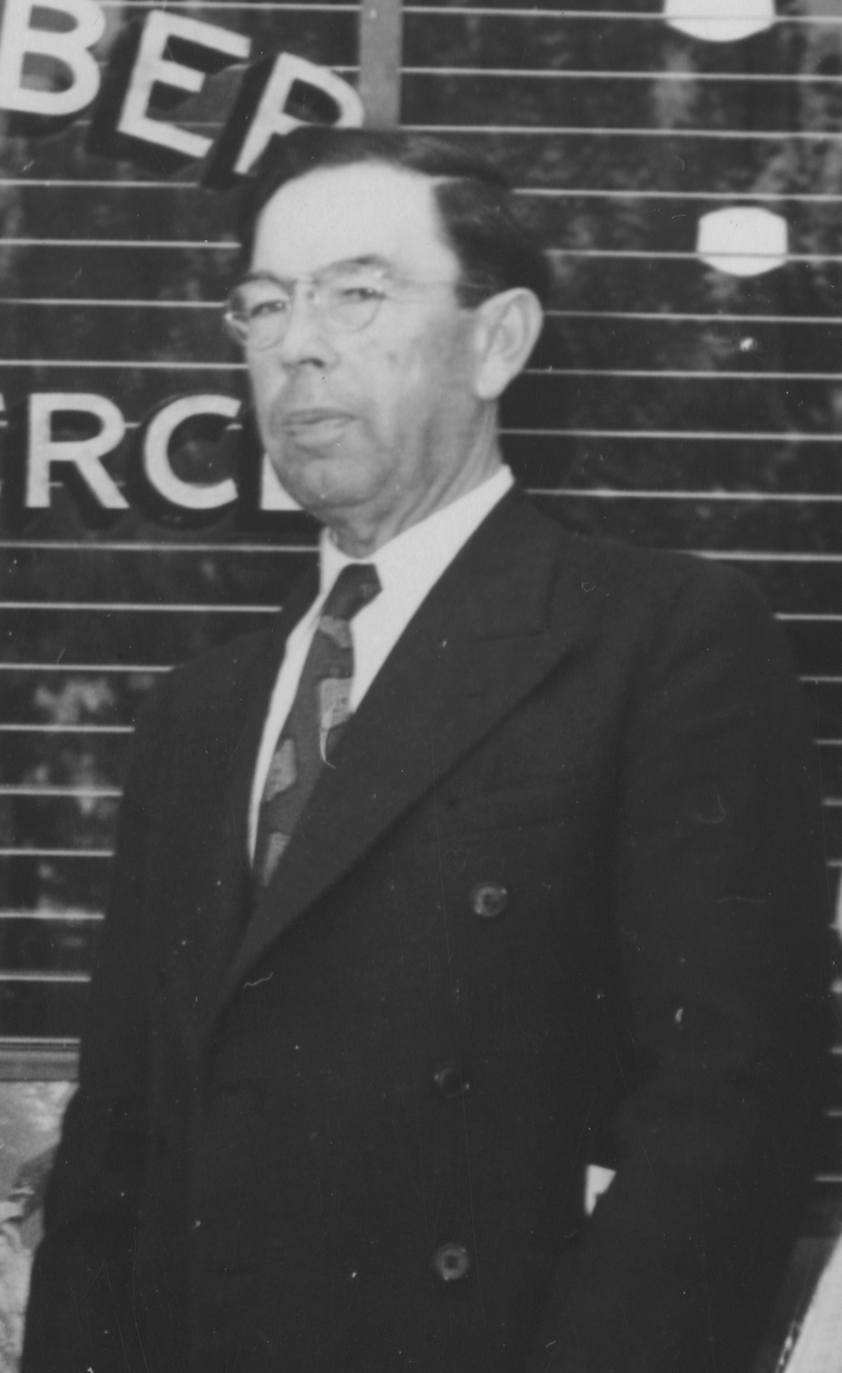
Bascom Lamar Lunsford, founder of the Mountain Dance and Folk Festival

Every year, numerous festivals are held through the Appalachian region, and throughout the world, to celebrate Appalachian music and related forms of music. One of the oldest is the Ole Time Fiddler's and Bluegrass Festival (known as "Fiddler's Grove") in Union Grove, North Carolina, which has been held continuously since 1924. It is held each year on Memorial Day weekend. In 1928, Appalachian musician and collector Bascom Lamar Lunsford, a native banjo player and fiddler of the North Carolina mountains, organized the Mountain Dance and Folk Festival, which is held annually in Asheville, North Carolina on the first weekend in August. Every September, Bristol hosts the old-time music festival, Rhythm & Roots Reunion. The American Folk Music Festival, established by Jean Bell Thomas in 1930, was held almost annually in Ashland, Kentucky and at various Kentucky state parks until 1972.

For five days during the first week of August each year, the Appalachian String Band Music Festival is held in Clifftop, West Virginia. This festival is dedicated to the preservation of authentic old-time string band music as well as traditional flatfoot dancing and square dancing. It features competition, performances, and workshops. Another popular festival for traditional old-time music, flatfoot dancing, as well as bluegrass music is the Tennessee Valley Old Time Fiddlers Convention, held annually the first weekend of October in Athens, Alabama. In Mount Airy, North Carolina, the Mount Airy Fiddlers Convention is held on the first weekend of June each year. The Bluff Mountain Festival is held in Hot Springs, North Carolina every year in June on the second Saturday following the first Friday. It features old-time, bluegrass, and traditional ballad music performances, as well as team clogging and individual flatfoot dancing.

Other annual festivals include Mountain Heritage Day at Western Carolina University in Cullowhee, North Carolina and the Celebration of Traditional Music at Berea College, both of which were first held in the 1970s. Another notable festival is The Museum of Appalachia's Tennessee Fall Homecoming. It is held annually in Clinton, Tennessee, on the museum grounds.

White Top Folk Festival was a popular festival in the 1930s. John Powell helped create and organize this festival. Musicians competed for prizes. This was a popular festival because it interested academic folklorists, musicologists, and journalists. In the third year more than 12,000 people attended the festival. The festival was discontinued in 1939 because of problems between the organizers and poor treatment of people without money.

The Fall Festival and Pig Roast was organized by The Appalachian Highlands Music Association (AHMA) to preserve the old Appalachian music. The price of festival tickets was low ($6). The festival drew primarily from the West Virginia public, but also included people from Ohio, Maryland, Alabama, and Virginia. Bands such as Country Charm and Country Pride, both of Princeton, and Gospel Grass, of Bluefield and Princeton, participated in the festival. This festival was last held in 2013.

== Music labels ==
Another popular commercial recording label was Chicago-based Flying Fish label. In 1970 they had 3 albums from musicians from West Virginia. They work with Critton Hollow String Band. This was a group based in Morgan County, W.V. They did hard work to produce their music and even though they do not publish a new song they made covers of some songs like "Possum Up a Gum Stump", "Ragged But Right", "High On a Mountain" which were composed by Ola Belle Reed.

== See also ==
- Music of East Tennessee
- Music of West Virginia
- Shape note
