= Erynn Marshall =

Canadian musician

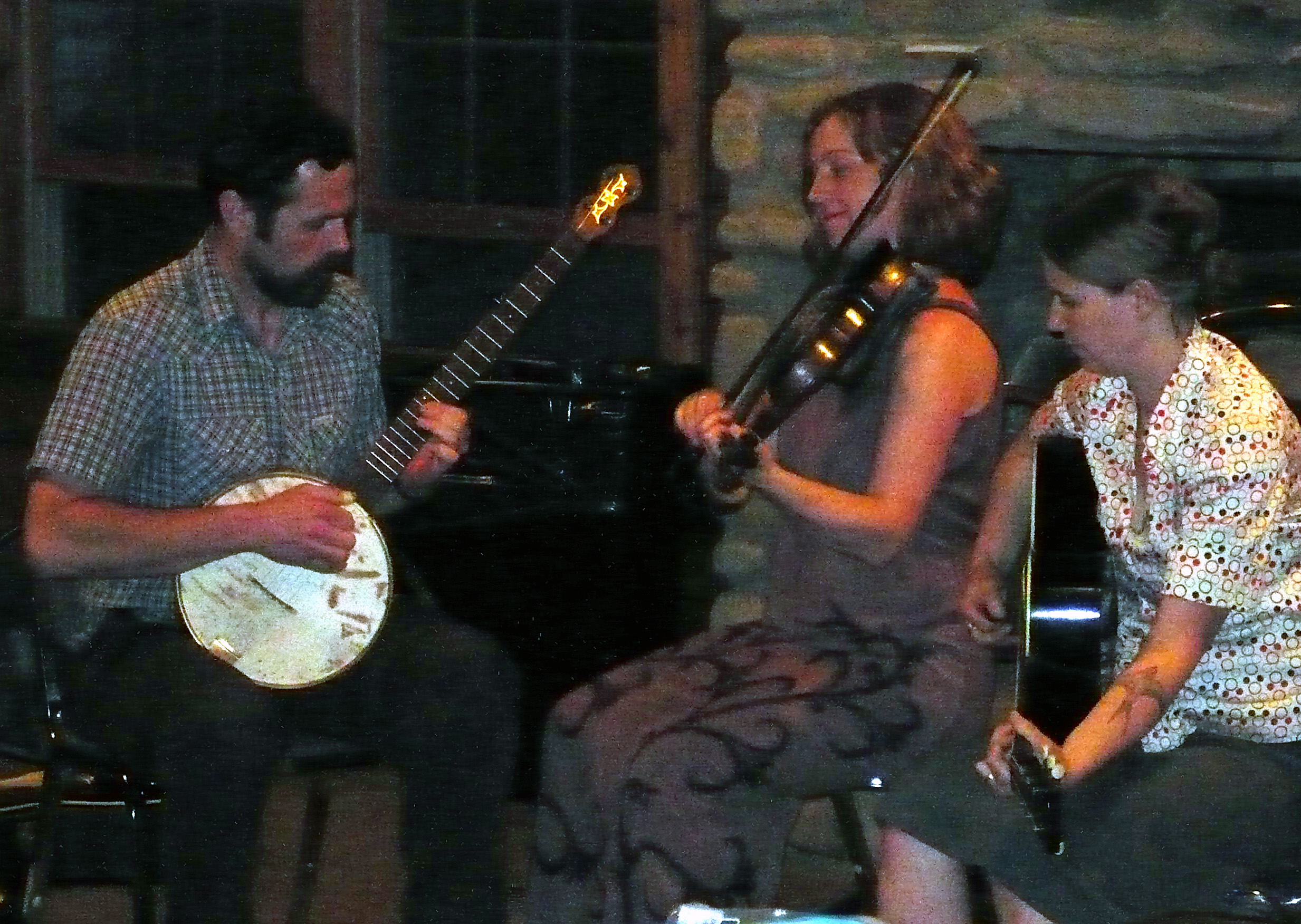
- Marshall (center), fiddling with The Haints Old Time Stringband in 2009

Background information
- Born: August 4, 1977 (age 49); Victoria, British Columbia
- Origin: Canada
- Genres: Old-time
- Occupations: Fiddler, ethnomusicologist, teacher, author
- Instrument: Fiddle
- Website: www.hickoryjack.com

Erynn Marshall (born c. August 4, 1977) is a Canadian old-time fiddler, ethnomusicologist, teacher, and author.

She is originally from Victoria, British Columbia and later lived in Gibsons, British Columbia. In 1998 she traveled to Toronto to pursue graduate studies at York University, graduating in 2003 with an M.A. degree in ethnomusicology. In 2006 she received an Appalachian Fellowship from Berea College in Kentucky, where studying Kentucky fiddle styles for three months. Her fiddle instructors include Melvin Wine, Lester McCumbers, Leland Hall, and Art Stamper.

She has performed with The Haints Old Time Stringband since 2007. In addition to playing, teaching, and writing about old-time music she also composes tunes. She has recorded with Eve Goldberg and Justin Rutledge.

Marshall has lived in Galax, Virginia since 2009. Since 2009 she has served as concert coordinator for the Blue Ridge Music Center.

She received a CBC Galaxie Rising Star Award in 2006 at the Edmonton Folk Music Festival. In 2008 she won the fiddle contest at the Clifftop festival in West Virginia, the first female and the first person from outside the United States to do so.

== Discography ==
=== As leader ===
- 2005 - Calico

=== With Chris Coole ===
- 2007 - Meet Me in the Music

=== With Eve Goldberg ===
- 2007 - A Kinder Season

=== With The Haints Old Time Stringband ===
- 2009 - Shout Monah

=== With Justin Rutledge ===
- 2004 - No Never Alone

=== With Carl Jones ===
- 2015 - Sweet Memories... never leave

== Books ==
- 2006 - Music in the Air Somewhere: The Shifting Borders of West Virginia's Fiddle and Song Traditions. West Virginia University Press.

== Films ==
- Ill Fly Away Home (Bravo)
- The Clifftop Experience (Outlook, West Virginia Public Broadcasting)
