= Manco Sneed =

- Born: February 18, 1885
- Died: January 30, 1975 (aged 89)
- Genres: old-time
- Occupation: musician
- Instruments: fiddle, banjo

Manco Sneed (February 18, 1885 – January 30, 1975) was a fiddle and banjo player from Western North Carolina who cultivated a unique and highly ornamented fiddle style that remains influential among old-time musicians.

== Biography ==
Manco Sneed was born in Jackson County to John Harrison Sneed, who was half-Cherokee, and Sarah Lovin Sneed. John was born to an English trader and a Cherokee woman. John was a left-handed fiddler who was locally renowned for his "trick" playing, which employed unusual gimmicks to delight listeners. After being scolded by his wife, it was reported that John would stroll down the lane playing “Going Down This Road Feeling Bad” while holding the fiddle behind his back. John and Sarah moved to Jackson County from Hiawassee, GA, shortly before Manco's birth. John was fluent in Cherokee and once served as interpreter for court proceedings in Bryson City, NC, that involved Cherokee and English-speaking parties.

Manco and his three brothers, Osco, Peco (or Peko), and Cameo, were exposed to traditional mountain music through community dances and other gatherings. Osco and Peco both learned to play instruments at home, while Cameo acquired a reputation for his dancing. When Manco was about 12 years old, his family moved to Graham County, where he embarked on a path that would lead him to far outstrip his family members in musical ability. There he encountered J.D. (Dedrick) Harris, a fiddler born in Flag Pond, TN, in 1859 who lived for some years in Andrews and Asheville, NC. Harris, who was well-known in the fiddle competition circuit and would later make commercial recordings, would become Sneed's greatest influence. When Sneed played with Harris, the two would switch off playing fiddle and banjo, although Sneed played banjo most of the time. Sneed learned one quarter of his vast repertoire from Harris and took pride in the fact that he was able to carry on Harris's musical legacy. Sneed also frequently played tunes with fiddler Mac Hensley and his nephew, Fiddlin’ Bill Hensley. He thought highly of both musicians, but is not known to have acquired repertoire from them.

In about 1903, when Sneed was about 18 years old, his father moved the family to the Cherokee tribal lands of the Qualla Boundary, near the town of Cherokee, NC. It is not clear why his father, who often expressed a negative opinion of Native Americans, orchestrated this move. After the move, Sneed became completely isolated from his community of musicians. There were very few dances in the area of Cherokee, and they catered only to the few white people in the region. Sneed continued to play at home while raising a family, and musicians would sometimes travel to visit and play with him. He also played for square dance teams at the Cherokee Fair and occasionally traveled to Asheville to perform at the Mountain Dance and Folk Festival. The festival organizer, Bascom Lamar Lunsford, was a good friend of Sneed and visited him often. As a result of his isolation, Sneed developed a highly distinctive style. Tennessee fiddler Joseph Decosimo has described that style as follows: “His playing is filled with nuance. Bowed triplets, an ornament heard on field recordings of an older generation of Appalachian fiddlers, adorn his playing. His fingers elaborate captivating melodies with intricately tangled cascades of notes. The location and pitch of his notes shift in confounding, powerful ways. There are bad notes and offness in his playing that make it supremely appealing to a handful of contemporary players.”

During most of his life, Sneed was renowned for his extraordinarily large repertoire. It was reported that he could play for hours on end without ever repeating a tune. However, by the time the first recordings were made of his playing, Sneed's memory and ability had both deteriorated. Field recorder Peter Hoover captured twelve tunes in 1959, while Blanton Owen recorded five additional tuned between 1970 and 1973. Sneed's son-in-law Joseph Laurel Johnson, also a fiddler, recorded 34 tunes at Sneed's home using a tape recorder in the 1960s, but only twelve were unique. In total, 28 of Manco's tunes were captured on recorded media near the end of his life. Those played most often by contemporary fiddlers are "Katy Hill," "Forks of Sandy," "Georgia Belle," "Polly Put the Kettle On" (which he learned from his father), and three tunes that he certainly learned from J.D. Harris: "Snowbird," "Grey Eagle," and "Billy in the Lowground."

Sneed passed on a love of music to his own children. His sons Lawrence and Russell Sneed played guitar and his daughter Mary-Russell played the fiddle. Sneed lived to be 89 years old and is buried in the Cam Sneed Cemetery.
