= Charles Blevins =

Former West Virginia folk music artist

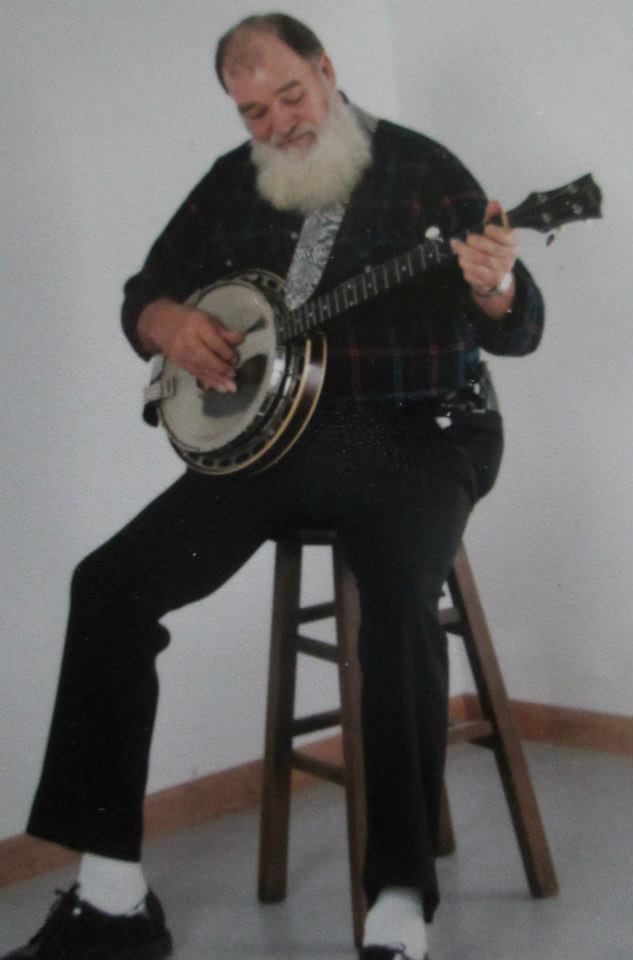

Background information
- Born: August 27, 1925; Pike County, Kentucky, US
- Died: August 24, 2004 (aged 78) Borderland, West Virginia, US
- Genres: Folk music
- Instrument: Banjo
- Formerly of: Charles Blevins and the Independenent Mountaineers

Charles Blevins was a West Virginia folk music artist and the owner of Red Robin Inn, in Borderland, West Virginia.

== Career ==
Blevins began his career in coal mining for 16 years, following in the footsteps of generations before him who had worked for the Borderland Coal Corporation in Mingo County, West Virginia. He later served in the US Navy during World War II and was stationed aboard the battleship, USS Alabama.

=== Red Robin Inn ===
After retiring, Blevins opened the Red Robin Inn with his father in 1953 in Borderland, West Virginia. He began his music career performing at the inn, often accompanied by his collection of banjos. His musical journey was deeply inspired by his mother and grandmother, who played various instruments. The tavern closed in 1993 when construction of U.S. Route 119 required the land it occupied. In its memory, a museum called Red Robin Plateau was established across the Tug Fork in Pike County, Kentucky.

=== Film ===
Blevins appeared in the West Virginia Public Broadcasting documentary Mountaineer, alongside Denise Giardina and Clyde Case. The film explores West Virginia culture and folklore.

== Personal life ==
Blevins is the brother-in-law of Burl Stafford.

== Gallery ==
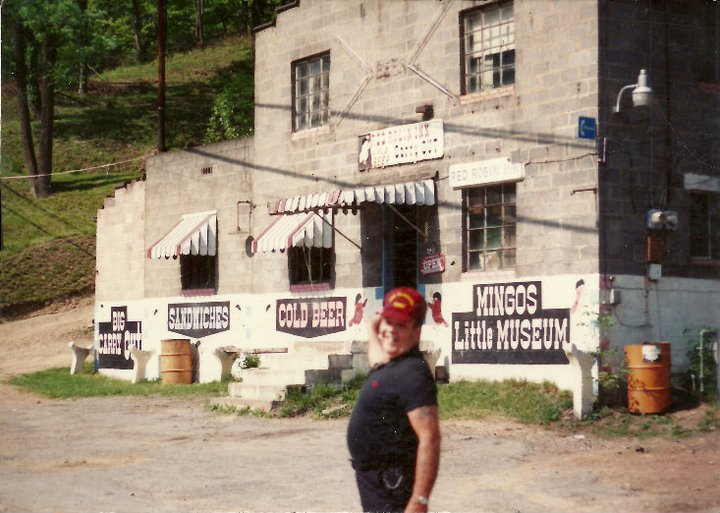
Charles Blevins standing in front of the Red Robin Inn

== See also ==
- Appalachian music
