= Borderland, West Virginia =

Unincorporated community in West Virginia, United States

- Unincorporated community
- Location within West Virginia Location within the United States
- Coordinates: 37°42′50″N 82°18′33″W
- Country: United States
- State: West Virginia
- County: Mingo
- Elevation: 653 ft (199 m)
- Time zone: UTC-5 (Eastern (EST))
  - Summer (DST): UTC-4 (EDT)
- ZIP code: 25665
- Area codes: 304 & 681
- GNIS feature ID: 1553952

Borderland is an unincorporated community in Mingo County, West Virginia, United States. Borderland is located along the Tug Fork and U.S. Routes 52 and 119, 3 miles (4.8 km) northwest of Williamson. Borderland had a post office, which opened on March 6, 1905, and closed on June 20, 2009.

The community is named for Borderland Coal Company, incorporated in 1903 in Roanoke, Virginia, and soon thereafter commenced a mining operation along the West Virginia-Kentucky border.

== Climate ==
The climate in this area is characterized by hot, humid summers and generally mild to cool winters. According to the Köppen Climate Classification system, Borderland has a humid subtropical climate, abbreviated "Cfa" on climate maps.

== Notable people ==
- Charles Blevins, a West Virginia folk music artist and the owner of Red Robin Inn, in Borderland, West Virginia.
