= J.D. (Dedrick) Harris =

- Born: November 3, 1859
- Died: March 6, 1933 (aged 73)
- Genres: old-time
- Occupation: musician
- Instrument: fiddle

J. D. (Dedrick) Harris (November 3, 1859 – March 6, 1933) was a fiddle player active in Western North Carolina. Little is known about his life, but he had an enormous influence on other musicians in the region.

== Biography ==
J. D. (Dedrick) Harris was born in Flag Pond, Tennessee. He moved to Andrews, NC some time before 1903. There, he played with a young Manco Sneed, who acquired a great deal of his repertoire and preserved at least three of his tunes into the 1960s, when they were recorded. He would later also influence Asheville fiddler Marcus Martin, whom he frequently met in fiddle contests and who acquired a number of his tunes. Harris was among the first mountain musicians from his region to be commercially recorded. In 1924 he travelled to New York City with Asheville musician Ernest Helton to record six sides. These were later released on the Broadway label, but might originally have been recorded by Paramount. In 1925 Harris was recorded again, this time by Ralph Peer, a legendary A&R (artists and repertory) man for Okeh Records who traveled to Asheville to set up a temporary recording studio in the George Vanderbilt Hotel. Harris's recording of "The Cackling Hen" was released by Peer, although he might have recorded other tunes as well during the session. That recording remains a noteworthy example of Harris's unique fiddle style.
