= Lester McCumbers =

American musician (1921–2015)

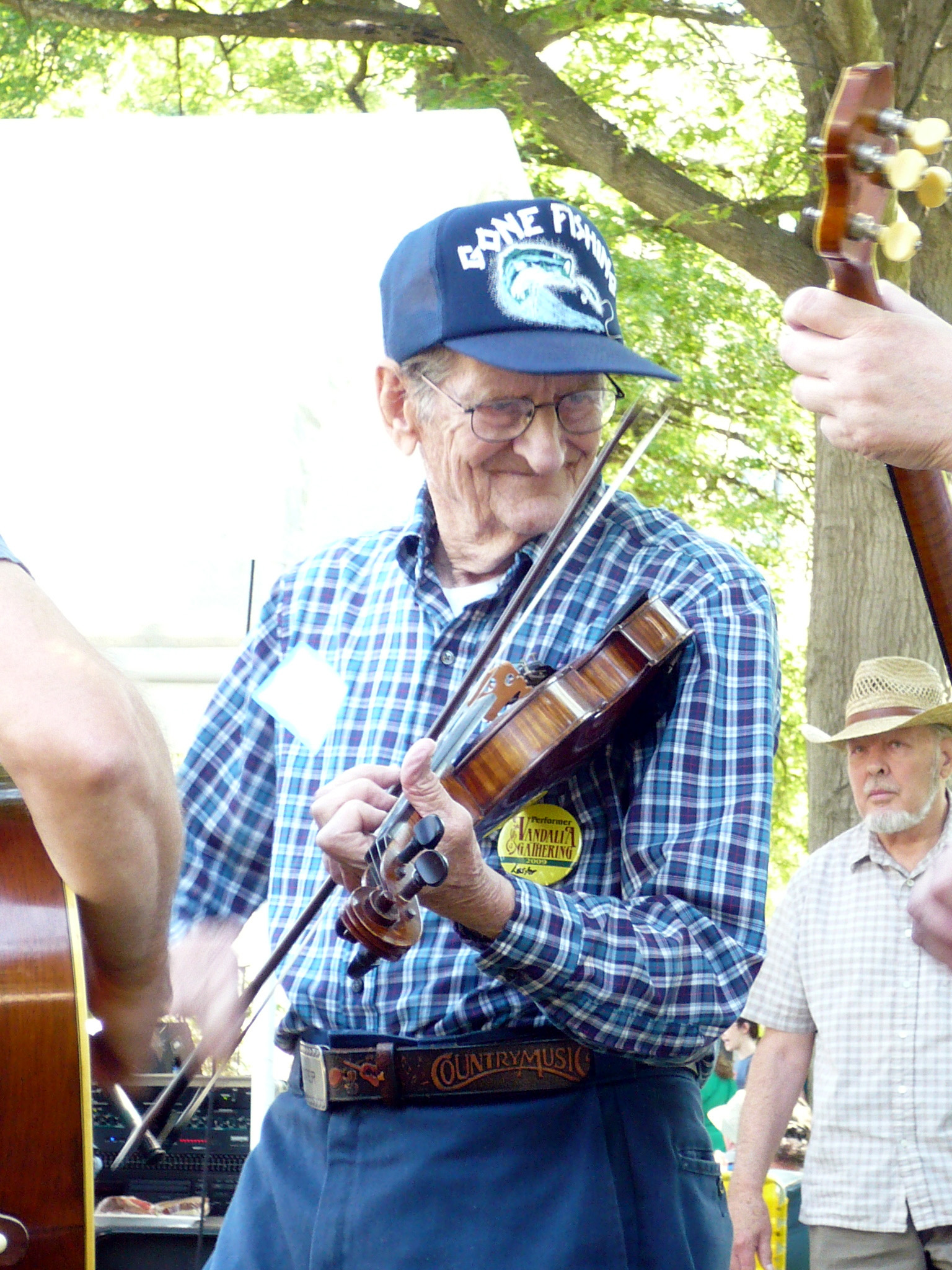
- McCumbers in 2009
- Born: 15 August 1921
- Died: January 26, 2015 (aged 93)
- Occupation: Fiddler

Lester McCumbers (August 15, 1921 – January 26, 2015) was an American old-time fiddler from Nicut, West Virginia. His students included Erynn Marshall and Jake Krack.

He also made fiddles, sometimes using local woods.

He utilized the "pancake grip" when holding his fiddle; that is, he rested the fiddle against his chest rather than under his chin, with the palm of his hand flat against the bottom of the fiddle's neck.

In December 1937, at the age of 16, McCumbers married the singer Malinda (known as Linda) McCumbers, with whom he performed for many decades. They had nine children together, some of whom are also musicians. Their son Roger, who played banjo, died in 1998 at age 43.

McCumbers often performed with his wife and children, as well as the banjo player Kim Johnson, who lived near him. He was a frequent visitor to the Appalachian String Band Music Festival in Clifftop, Fayette County, West Virginia, where he won first prize in the fiddle competition for his age group.

McCumbers was featured in The New York Times in 1999.

== Films ==
- That Old-Time Sound: Old-Time Music and Old-Time Ways of Central West Virginia
