= Nicut =

Nicut may refer to:

- Nicut, Oklahoma
- Nicut, West Virginia
