= Marcus Martin (fiddler) =

- Born: August 2, 1881
- Died: March 20, 1974 (aged 92)
- Genres: old-time
- Occupations: farmer, logger, postmaster, woodworker, and watchman
- Instrument: fiddle

Marcus Lafayette Martin (August 2, 1881 – March 20, 1974) was a fiddle player in North Carolina. He was well-known in the region during his lifetime and his recordings continue to influence the repertoire and style of old-time musicians.

== Biography ==
Marcus Martin was born in the Aquone community of Macon County, North Carolina on August 2, 1881. As a child he learned fiddle repertoire and technique from his father, Nathaniel “Rowan” Martin, who was half Cherokee, and also from the Cherokee fiddler Manco Sneed. Martin began performing publicly at a young age, often providing music for square dances in Macon and Cherokee counties without any accompaniment. Like many rural musicians in the Southern Appalachians, Martin played various instruments, including banjo and harmonica, and also sang ballads. Martin married banjo player Callie Holloway and they had six children together, including five boys and a girl: Fred, Quentin, Wade, Kendall “Wayne,” Edsel, and Zenobia. As a young man he tried various jobs, including working for a dry goods company, filing saws for loggers, and serving as the postmaster of the community of Rhodo. In the 1920s, however, he separated from Holloway and took his sons to Swannanoa, where he assumed the post of watchman at the Beacon Blanket Mill. According to local legend, Martin was hired on the spot when the mill's owner, Charles D. Owen, heard him play the fiddle. Owen intended to use Martin to provide entertainment to the workers, thereby quelling unrest and dampening any efforts toward unionization. Owen had relocated the factory from New Bedford, Massachusetts in 1923 explicitly to prevent his workers from unionizing.

Martin gained fame as a fiddler after Bascom Lamar Lunsford founded the Mountain Dance and Folk Festival in nearby Asheville in 1928. He became a favorite of Lunsford and was called upon to open every festival with a performance of his tune "Grey Eagle." He won the “Old Timey Fiddler’s Convention” Championship at the North Carolina State Fair in Raleigh in 1949 and again in 1950 before withdrawing from competition. Martin had already attracted the attention of folklorists who made a large number of field recordings of his playing in the 1940s, which were deposited in the Library of Congress. In 1959, Peter Hoover travelled from Pittsburgh to record 54 of Martin's tunes. However, he had stopped playing by the 1960s, with the result that he was not able to benefit as a performer from the burgeoning folk revival.

In addition to making music, Martin also constructed instruments, including fiddles and mountain dulcimers, and carved figurines.
