= Jake Krack =

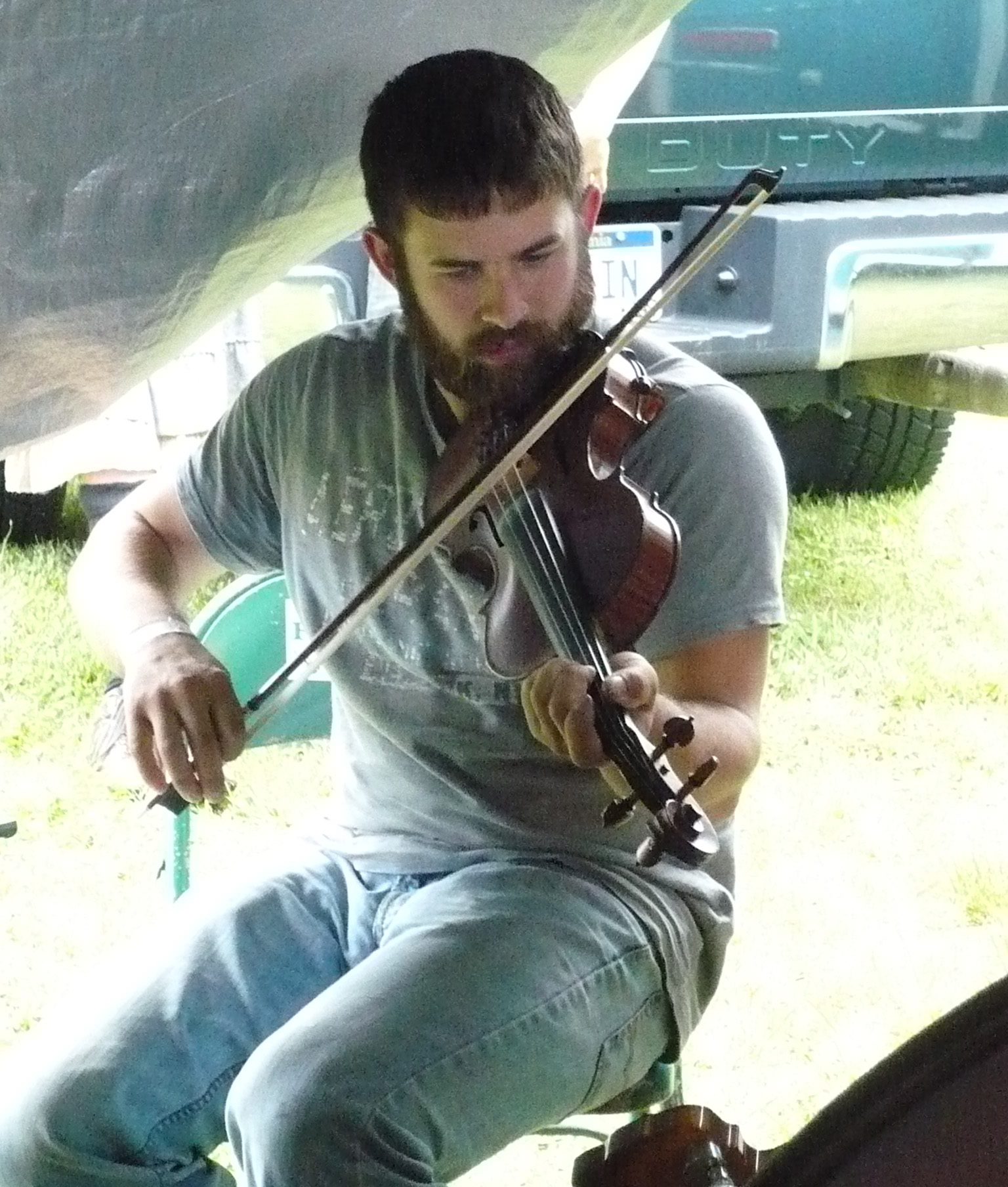
- Jake Krack playing the fiddle in 2009

Background information
- Born: 1984 (age 41–42)
- Genres: old-time
- Occupation: Musician
- Instrument: Fiddle

Jake Krack (born 1984) son of Reed and Dara Krack, is a prominent young old-time fiddler and fiddle teacher from Nicut in the U.S. state of West Virginia. He began fiddling at age six or eight. His teachers include Bobby Taylor, Lester McCumbers, Melvin Wine, Brad Leftwich, Joe Thompson, Wilson Douglas, and Glen Smith.

== Musical career ==
He received a B.A. degree from Berea College in Kentucky in 2007, where his friends called him "Jack". He has had two internships: at the Smithsonian Institution with music archivist Jeff Place and with the West Virginia Humanities Council, working on the Mountain Music Heritage Project.

Krack performed on the A Prairie Home Companion radio program in 1998, and on the Mountain Stage radio program in 2000. Also in 2000 he performed at the Millennium Stage of the John F. Kennedy Center for the Performing Arts. He performed at MerleFest in 2002 and in the 2003 Smithsonian Folklife Festival.

He has won first place in old-time fiddle at the Galax Fiddlers Convention in Galax, Virginia (2003, 2006, and 2008), the Henry Reed Festival (2007), the Clifftop festival in Clifftop, Fayette County, West Virginia (2006), the Mount Airy Fiddlers' Convention in Mount Airy, North Carolina (2002, 2004, and 2009), and the under-60 category at the Vandalia Gathering in Charleston, West Virginia (2002).

He compiled, arranged, and co-produced the 2007 Smithsonian Folkways CD Classic Old-time Fiddle From Smithsonian Folkways, and coproduced Lester McCumbers' CD Old Timey.

He was featured in The New York Times in 1999 and appeared in the 2004 PBS documentary Soundmix: Five Young Musicians.

== Discography ==
=== As leader ===
- Second Time Around
- Hope I'll Join the Band
- Wire Fire
- Home at Last
- One More Time
- How 'bout that
- Git er Done

=== With Todd Clewell ===
- Jake's Ramble

=== With The Hog Hollar Stringband ===
- The Great Compromise

=== With Doug Van Gundy ===
- Two Far Gone

=== Compilations ===
- Oasis Acoustic: Volume 1 (4-CD set)

== Films ==
- 2004 - Soundmix: Five Young Musicians
