= Copen, West Virginia =

Unincorporated community in West Virginia, United States

Copen
- Unincorporated community
- Location within the state of West Virginia Copen (the United States)
- Coordinates: 38°50′15″N 80°43′46″W
- Country: United States
- State: West Virginia
- County: Braxton
- Time zone: UTC-5 (Eastern (EST))
  - Summer (DST): UTC-4 (EDT)
- ZIP code: 26615
- Area codes: 304 and 681
- GNIS feature ID: 1549639

Copen is an unincorporated community in Braxton County, central West Virginia, United States. The community is located at the confluence of Copen and Bull Fork Creeks. Its most famous resident was Melvin Wine (1909–2003), an acclaimed old-time fiddler.

Neighboring towns: Flower; 1.5 miles west, Arnette; southeast, Burnsville; east, Bower; north

The community has the name of John Copen, a pioneer settler.
