= Phil Jamison =

American folk musician and dance leader

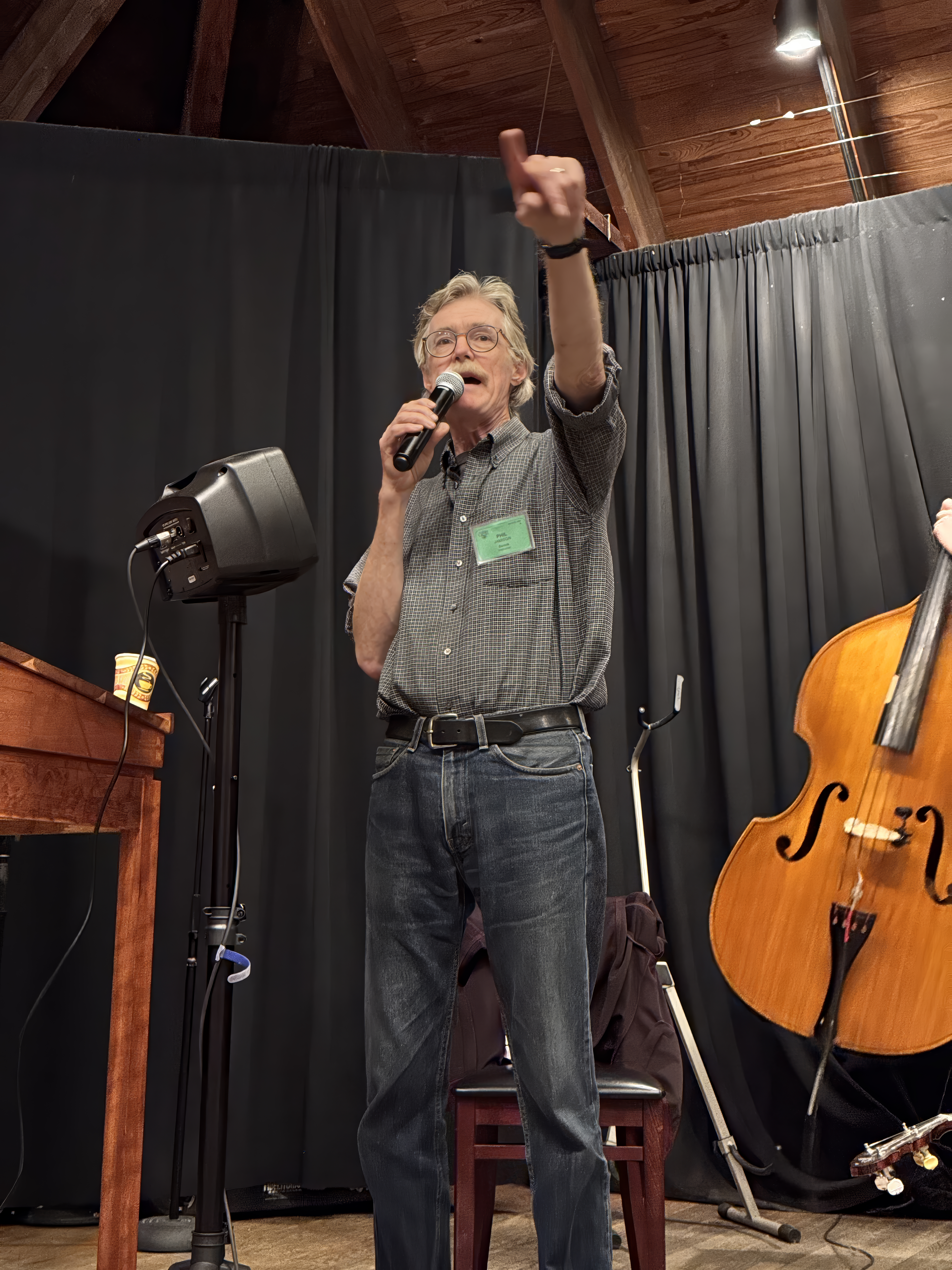
- Calling Dare to be Square at the John C. Campbell Folk School

Background information
- Genres: Folk
- Occupations: Musician, folk dance caller
- Instruments: Guitar, fiddle, banjo
- Years active: 1964–present
- Website: http://www.philjamison.com/

Phil Jamison is an American professional square dance and folk dance caller and musician. He began calling square dances in New York's Adirondacks Mountains and moved to North Carolina in 1980.

== Life ==
Jamison is a resident of Buncombe County, North Carolina. He has taught music, performed, and called dances since the early 1970s. He taught traditional music and dance as well as mathematics for nearly 30 years at Warren Wilson College in Asheville, North Carolina.

Jamison was the official square dance caller of the 1980 Winter Olympics. He also performed at the 1982 World's Fair, the Kennedy Center, the Library of Congress, the National Centre for the Performing Arts in Beijing, the North Carolina History Museum, and the Smithsonian Folklife Festival. He also appeared on ABC's “Good Morning America.” Jamison has performed in nearly 20 countries, including China, France, Spain, and Sweden. Jamison has coordinated the Old-Time Music and Dance Week at Warren Wilson College’s Swannanoa Gathering since its founding in 1992. He also created the annual “Dare to be Square” caller workshop. He's led workshops at the John C. Campbell Folk School, Berea College, and Pinewoods Camp, among other well-known dance hubs.

Jamison wrote the book Hoedowns, Reels, and Frolics: Roots and Branches of Southern Appalachian Dance, published in 2015. In 2016 Jamison was the grand champion winner of the flat-footing competition at the Appalachian String Band Music Festival. He was a Blue Ridge Music Hall of Fame inductee in 2017 and an America's Clogging Hall of Fame inductee in 2022.

He has served as square dance consultant and teacher for two Hollywood films, Songcatcher (2000) and Killers of the Flower Moon (2023). Jamison called dances for each of the films and can be seen on screen. He also collaborated with Rayna Gellert for a tune on the Killers of the Flower Moon soundtrack album.

== See also ==
- Callerlab, the International Association of Square Dance Callers
- Square dance program
