= Appalachian String Band Music Festival =

Folk music festival

Coordinates: 38°0′36″N 80°58′14″W

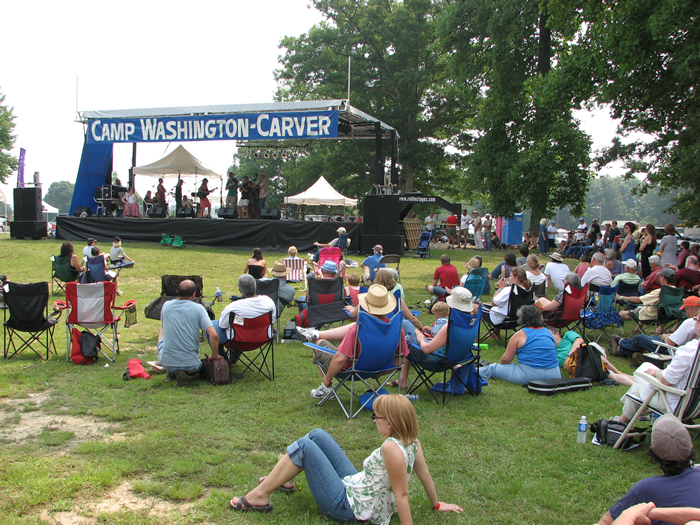
- The main stage at the 2007 Appalachian String Band Music Festival
- Genre: old-time music
- Dates: founded 1990
- Location: New River Gorge in West Virginia
- Years active: 1990-present
- Founders: Will Carter and The WV Division of Culture & History
- Attendance: 4000
- Website: Official site

The Appalachian String Band Music Festival (often referred to simply as "Clifftop") is a weeklong gathering of thousands of string band musicians and their friends from across the country and around the world, who each year since 1990 have assembled near the New River Gorge in West Virginia in late July/early August to celebrate the evolving tradition of old-time music and the community of people who keep it thriving by preserving and contributing to that tradition.

== History ==
Though the Festival offers contests (traditional band, neo-traditional band, fiddle, old-time banjo, and flatfoot dancing), square dancing, several concerts and workshops, and other organized activities such as yoga, basket making, and hymn singing, the heart and soul of the Festival is found in the campsites, where old time music provides a foundation for all kinds of straight-off-the-strings acoustic music (including Americana, cajun, Celtic, swing, bluegrass, Dawg, and even reggae), which in turn often spontaneously generate impromptu dancing and other festivities by the people gathered within earshot.

Though the Festival officially starts the Wednesday before the first full weekend in August, the grounds start filling up the weekend before with well-adorned campsites, many of which have music being played through the night. One of the Festival's unique features is the Neo-Traditional Band Contest on Friday, in which highest scores are given to bands that creatively extend the old time music tradition into other musical voices, instrumentation, and styles.

Over the years, the Festival has been frequented by well known Nashville musicians like John Hartford and Tim O'Brien and Leftover Salmon jam band leader Vince Hermann, and old time Appalachian musicians like Melvin Wine and Lester McCumbers, leading "second generation" of old time musicians like Mike Seeger, Bruce Molsky, Rafe Stefanini, Brad Leftwich, and Ira Bernstein, and the youngest generation of old time musicians like Jake Krack.

The Festival takes place each summer at Camp Washington-Carver, in Clifftop, Fayette County, West Virginia, United States and is sponsored by the West Virginia Division of Culture and History.

== Past winners ==
	Open Fiddle	Senior Fiddle	Youth Fiddle	Open Banjo	Senior Banjo	Youth Banjo	Grand Champion Old-Time Flat-foot Dance Winner	Old-Time Flat-foot Dance – 60 years and older	Old-Time Flat-foot Dance – 41 years through 59	Old-Time Flat-foot Dance – 16 years through 40	Old-Time Flat-foot Dance – 15 years and under	Neo-Traditional Band	Youth Neo-Traditional Band	Traditional Band	Youth Traditional Band
2025	Andrew Small (Floyd, VA)	Gerry Milnes (Elkins, WV)	Josh Wills (Checotah, OK)	Mitch Depew (Moorestown, NJ)	Mac Traynham (Willis, VA)	Rowan DeMont (Elverson, PA)	Becky Hill (Brentwood, MD)	Gordy Hinners (Banner Elk, NC)	Becky Hill (Brentwood, MD)	Becky Hill (Brentwood, MD)	Colette Rainwater (Murfreesboro, TN)	From China to Appalachia (Silver Spring, MD)	The Bogey’s (Boone, NC)	The New Floyd County Ramblers (Floyd, VA)	Turtle Mountain (Winchester, KY)
2024	Tessa McCoy (Greenville, WV)	Gerry Milnes (Elkins, WV)	Sylvie Davis (Leicester, NC)	Adam Hurt (Danville, VA)	Gerry Milnes (Elkins, WV)	Edwin McCoy (Greenville, WV)	Jacob Fennell (Dickson, TN)	Ruth Alpert (Santa Barbara, CA)	Kelsey Sutton (Providence, RI)	Kelsey Sutton (Providence, RI)	Jacob Fennell (Dickson, TN)	Blue Ridge Gathering (Maryville, TN)	The Rockin’ Chestnuts (Delaware, OH)	The McCoys (Greenville, WV)	The Bogey’s (Boone, NC)
2023	AJ Srubas (Minneapolis, MN)	Christopher Germain (Abington, PA)	Liam Farley (Chapmanville, WV)	Chance McCoy (Greenville, WV)	Mark Rast (Lancaster, PA)	Edwin McCoy (Greenville, WV)	Ruth Alpert (Santa Barbara, CA)	Ruth Alpert (Santa Barbara, CA)	Nathan Vargo (Pittsburgh, PA)	Nathan Vargo (Pittsburgh, PA)	Ola Moeckel (Floyd, VA)	The Wild Shoats (Morgantown, WV)	The Ithaca Floyd Exchange (Floyd, VA)	The McCoys (Greenville, WV)	The Old Time Rowdies (Floyd, VA)
2022	Tessa Dillon (St. Albans, WV)	Peter Vigour (Croset, VA)	Huck Tritsch (Millheim, PA)	Trevor Hammons (Marlinton, WV)	Thomas Traynham (Willis, VA)	Samuel Harris (Raleigh, NC)	Jacob Fennell (Dickson, TN)	Jane Henderson, (Bloom, TN)	Margaret Van Doreen (Ann Arbor, MI)	Margaret Van Doreen (Ann Arbor, MI)	Jacob Fennell (Dickson, TN)	Hemlock & Hickory (Capon Bridge, WV)	The Long Necked Legs (Asheville, NC)	The Tennessee Hillbuddies (Elizabethton, TN)	The Flaming Fire (Lexington, VA)
2021	--	--	--	--	--	--	--	--	--	--	--	--	--	--	--
2020	--	--	--	--	--	--	--	--	--	--	--	--	--	--	--
2019	Nokosee Fields (Stillwater, OK)	Walt Koken (Avondale, PA)	Huck Tritsch (Millheim, PA)	Jake Blount (Washington, DC)	Walt Koken (Avondale, PA)	Nora Brown (Brooklyn, NY)	Ruth Alpert (Santa Barbara, CA)	Ruth Alpert (Santa Barbara, CA)	Kathy Grabarczyk (Brooklyn, NY)	Matthew Kupstas (Hickory, NC)	Ola Moeckel (Floyd, VA)	Ken and Brad Kolodner Quartet (Baltimore, MD)	Ithassippi String Band (Ithaca, NY)	The Ruglifters (Asheville, NC)	The Rattlesnake Roasters (Frederick, MD)
2018	Henry Barnes (Washington Court House, OH)	Betty Vornbrock (Hillsville, VA)	Aila Wildman (Floyd, VA)	Cathy Fink (Silver Spring, MD)	Cathy Fink (Silver Spring, MD)	Nora Brown (Brooklyn, NY)	Gordy Hinners (Banner Elk, NC)	Gordy Hinners (Banner Elk, NC)	Ben Lieb (Concord, CA)	Becky Hill (Ashland City, TN)	Audrey Sementilli (Albany, OH)	Take Two (Charlottesville, VA)	Ithingtons (Ithaca, NY)	Big Possum Stringband (St. Albans, WV)	Joseph Riley (Hillsboro, WV)
2017	Rhys Jones (Warrenton, VA)	Barb Kuhns (Medway, OH)	Lillian Chase (Weaverville, NC)	Micah Spence (Chattanooga, TN)	Pete Peterson (Oxford, PA)	Nora Brown (Brooklyn, NY)	Hillary Klug (Shelbyville, TN)	Phil Jamison (Asheville, NC)	Susan Chalker (Sparks, MD)	Hillary Klug (Shelbyville, TN)	Luke Snuffer (Beckley, WV)	Che Apalache (Clemmons, NC)	Selin Brothers (N/A)	The Onlies (Seattle, WA)	Mud Hole Out of Control (Marlinton, WV)
2016	Jason Cade (Athens, GA)	Pete Vigour (Crozet, VA)	Andrew Vogts (Chadds Ford, PA)	Bob Smakula (Elkins, WV)	Pete Peterson (Oxford, PA)	Joey Webb (Frankfort, KY)	Phil Jamison (Asheville, NC)	Phil Jamison (Asheville, NC)	Maureen Reed Burke (Tullahoma, TN)	Becky Hill (Elkins, WV)	Luke Snuffer (Beckley, WV)	The Early Mays (Pittsburgh, PA)	N/A (N/A)	The Moose Whisperers (Oslo, Norway)	The Onlies, (Seattle, WA)
2015	Jake Krack (Marlinton, WV)	Rafe Stefanini (Elkins Park, PA)	Andrew Vogts (Chadds Ford, PA)	Victor Furtado (Front Royal, VA)	Marvin Gaster (Sanford, NC)	Victor Furtado (Front Royal, VA)	Suzanne Ambrose (Kendal, Cumbria, UK)	Rosie Davis (Palmerstown, Dublin, Ireland)	Suzanne Ambrose (Kendal, Cumbria, UK)	Gyasi Heus (Hinton, WV)	Victor Furtado (Front Royal, VA)	Roochie Toochie & the Ragtime Shepherd Kings (Nashville, TN)	The Psycho Exploding Orangutans (Chadds Ford, PA)	Buffalo Gap (Swoope, VA)	The Onlies (Seattle, WA)
2014	Aaron Olwell (Nellysford, VA)	Dan Gellert (Dayton, OH)	William Brauneis (Washington, DC)	Bob Smakula (Elkins, WV)	Dan Gellert (Dayton, OH)	Victor Furtado (Front Royal, VA)	Sam Timmreck (Minneapolis, MN)	Steve Green (West Fork, AK)	Bill McGuigan (Hellam, PA)	Sam Timmreck (Minneapolis, MN)	Victor Furtado (Front Royal, VA)	No. 46-1/2 (Beckley, WV)	The Gypsy Hoppers (Urbana, Ill)	Bucking Mules (Durham, NC)	Lost Hat (Berkeley, CA)
2013	Clelia Stefanini (Elkins Park, PA)	Pete Vigour (Crozet, VA)	Leo Shannon (Seattle, WA)	Tim Bing (Huntington, WV)	John Morris (Ivydale, WV)	Victor Furtado (Front Royal, VA)	--	Kim Forry (Annapolis, MD)	Jay Bland (Kennesaw, GA)	Josephine Stewart (Charlottesville, VA)	Rebecca Molaro (Asheville, NC)	No. 47 (Elkins, WV)	The Mario Brothers Three (Fisherville, VA)	We See It, We Take It (Montrose, WV)	Elm Street Alley Cats (Elkins, WV)
2012	Emily Schaad (Poughkeepsie, NY)	Paul Brown (Winston-Salem, NC)	Nina DeVitry (Columbia, PA)	Mac Traynham (Willis, VA)	Mike Kropp (Wyoming, RI)	Victor Furtado (Front Royal, VA)	--	Rodney Sutton (Marshall, NC)	Jay Bland (Kennesaw, GA)	Sarah Josephine Stewart (Charlottesville, VA)	Rebecca Molaro (Asheville, NC)	Drunken Catfish Ramblers (Fayetteville, AR)	Davy Jones’ Evidence Locker (Elkins, WV)	The Bucking Mules (Jonesborough, TN)	Lyin’ Lizzy and the Psycho Exploding Orangutans (Front Royal, Va)
2011	John Showman (Toronto, Canada)	Walt Koken (Avondale, PA)	Andrew Vogts (Chadds Ford, PA)	Walt Koken (Avondale, PA)	Rick Good (Spring Valley, OH)	Victor Furtado (Front Royal, VA)	--	Marilyn Branch (Kalamazoo, MI)	Jay Bland (Kennesaw, GA)	Becky Hill (Elkins, WV)	Rebecca Molaro (Asheville, NC)	The Fish From Within (Lancaster, PA)	Banana Express (Winchester, VA)	Ratchet Mountain Rock Farmers (Athens, OH)	Psycho Exploding Orangutans (Front Royal, VA)
2010	Joseph Decosimo (Durham, NC)	Lester McCumbers (Nicut, WV)	William Brauneis (Washington, DC)	Paul Brown (Winston-Salem, NC)	Walt Koken (Avondale, PA)	Edward Bennett (Penzance, Cornwall, England)	--	Tom Ogden (Pittsburgh, PA)	Ira Bernstein (Asheville, NC)	Becky Hill (Elkins, WV)	Rebecca Molaro (Asheville, NC)	Haggard Hopefuls (Ephrata, PA)	David's Nasty Toenail (Front Royal, VA)	Big Foot (Marshall, NC)	Guide Chickens (Washington, DC)
2009	Tatiana Hargreaves (Corvallis, OR)	Lester McCumbers (Nicut, WV)	Tatiana Hargreaves (Corvallis, OR)	Adam Hurt (Kernersville, NC)	Walt Koken (Avondale, Pa)	Jesse Reist (Lancaster, PA)	--	Daniel Butner (Winston-Salem, NC)	Ira Bernstein (Asheville, NC)	Josephine Stewart (Charlottesville, VA)	Rebecca Molaro (Asheville, NC)	Nora Jane Struthers and Her Band (Nashville, TN)	--	The Bailers (Greenville, WV)	--
2008	Erynn Marshall (Gibsons, British Columbia)	Walt Koken (Avondale, PA)	Isaac Akers (Chapel Hill, NC)	Tim Bing (Huntington, WV)	Jimmy McCown (Hardy, KY)	Corbin Hayslett (Amherst, VA)	--	Thomas Maupin (Murfreesboro, TN)	Ira Bernstein (Asheville, NC)	Becky Hill (Elkins, WV)	Rebecca Molaro (Asheville, NC)	Special Ed and the Short Bus (Richmond, VA)	--	The New Mules (Bloomington, IN)	--
2007	Mike Bryant (Harriman, TN)	Jim Cauthen (Birmingham, AL)	Meade Richter (Sugar Grove, NC)	Adam Hurt (Winston-Salem, NC)	Walt Koken (Avondale, Pa)	Frank Evans (Toronto, Canada)	--	Thomas Maupin (Murfreesboro, TN)	Ira Bernstein, (Asheville, NC)	Ira Bernstein, (Asheville, NC)	Molly McGuigan (Hellam, PA)	Old-Time Liberation Front (Lancaster, PA)	--	New Dixie Entertainers (Harriman, TN)	--
2006	Jake Krack (Orma, WV)	Jerry Lewis (Nettie, WV)	Isaac Akers (Chapel Hill, NC)	Jeremy Stephens (Danville, VA)	Pete Peterson (Oxford, PA)	Cole Holland (Athens, AL)	--	Carole Bendick (Winfield, PA)	Ira Bernstein (Asheville, NC)	Ira Bernstein (Asheville, NC)	Alice Jameson (Asheville, NC)	Polecat Creek (Greensboro, NC)	--	Whoopin’ Holler String Band (Orma, WV)	--
2005	Jimmy Triplett (Ames, IA)	Speedy Tolliver (Arlington, VA)	Myra Morrison (Big Prairie, OH)	Mac Traynham (Willis, VA)	Marvin Gaster (Sanford, NC)	Frank Evans (Toronto, Canada)	--	Thomas Maupin (Murfreesboro, TN)	Gordy Hinners (Weaverville, NC)	Gordy Hinners (Weaverville, NC)	Haley McGuigan (Hellam, PA)	Red Stick Ramblers (Eunice, LA)	--	The Moonshine Monsters (Meadowbridge, WV)	--
2004	Lester McCumbers (Nicut, WV)	Lester McCumbers (Nicut, WV)	Jarred Nutter (Meadow Bridge, WV)	Brian Fain (Stuart, VA)	Mack Benford (Trumansburg, NY)	Jarred Nutter (Meadow Bridge, WV)	--	Charley Burton (Harmony, PA)	Ira Bernstein (Asheville, NC)	Ira Bernstein (Asheville, NC)	Trinity Kronk (Sewickley, PA)	Yeah Buddies (Spring Valley, OH)	--	Big Missouri (St. Louis, MO)	--
2003	Mark Simos (Watertown, MA)	Lester McCumbers (Nicut, WV)	Jarred Nutter (Meadow Bridge, WV)	Adam Hurt (Greensboro, NC)	Mack Benford (Trumansburg, NY)	Joanna Hartness (Greensboro, NC)	--	Thomas Maupin (Murfreesboro, TN)	Andy Deaver-Edmonston (Tucker, GA)	Andy Deaver-Edmonston (Tucker, GA)	Saralyn Miller (Centerville, TN)	Mando Mafia (Barboursville, VA)	--	Hoover Uprights (Beltsville, MD)	--
2002	Rhys Jones (Chicago, IL)	Lester McCumbers (Nicut, WV)	Zack Fanok (Morgantown, WV)	Brian Fain (Stuart, VA)	Marvin Gaster (Sanford, NC)	Seth Swingle (Earlysville, VA)	--	Ed Carson (Hot Rock, TN)	Sharon Leahy (Spring Valley, OH)	Sharon Leahy (Spring Valley, OH)	Emma Leahy-Good (Spring Valley, OH)	Synch-A-Therapy (Breaux Bridge, LA)	--	Big Medicine (Raleigh, NC)	--
2001	Mark Campbell (Richmond, VA)	Junior Spencer (Frankford, WV)	Stephanie Coleman (Glenville, IL)	Jake Owen (Marshall, NC)	Marvin Gaster (Sanford, NC)	Katherine Gura (Chapel Hill, NC)	--	Thomas Maupin (Murfreesboro, TN)	Gordy Hinners (Weaverville, NC)	Gordy Hinners (Weaverville, NC)	Andrea Edwards (Copen, WV)	Cuttin’ Up Gumby (Harrisonburg, VA)	--	Hoover Uprights (Beltsville, MD)	--
2000	Kirk Sutphin (Walkertown, NC)	Elmer Rich (Morgantown, WV)	Stephanie Coleman (Glenville, IL)	Brien Fain (Stuart, VA)	Don Sarrell (Rising Fawn, GA)	Stephanie Coleman (Glenville, IL)	--	Marilyn Branch (Kalamazoo, MI)	Ira Bernstein (Asheville, NC)	Ira Bernstein (Asheville, NC)	Andrea Edwards (Copen, WV)	The Marzaks (Charlottesville, VA)	--	New Dixie Entertainers (Harriman, TN)	--
1999	Bruce Molsky (Arlington, VA)	J.P. Fraley (Denton, KY)	Zack Fanok (Morgantown, WV)	Joe Newberry (Durham, NC)	Don Sarrell (Rising Fawn, GA)	Lydia Garrison (Ithaca, NY)	--	Marilyn Branch (Kalamazoo, MI)	Phil Loyer (Riner, VA)	Phil Loyer (Riner, VA)	Chloe Edmonstone (Charlotte, NC)	Mando Mafia (Charlottesville, VA)		New Dixie Entertainers (Harriman, TN)	

== See also ==
- List of bluegrass music festivals
