= Clifftop, Raleigh County, West Virginia =

Unincorporated community in West Virginia, United States

Clifftop
- Unincorporated community
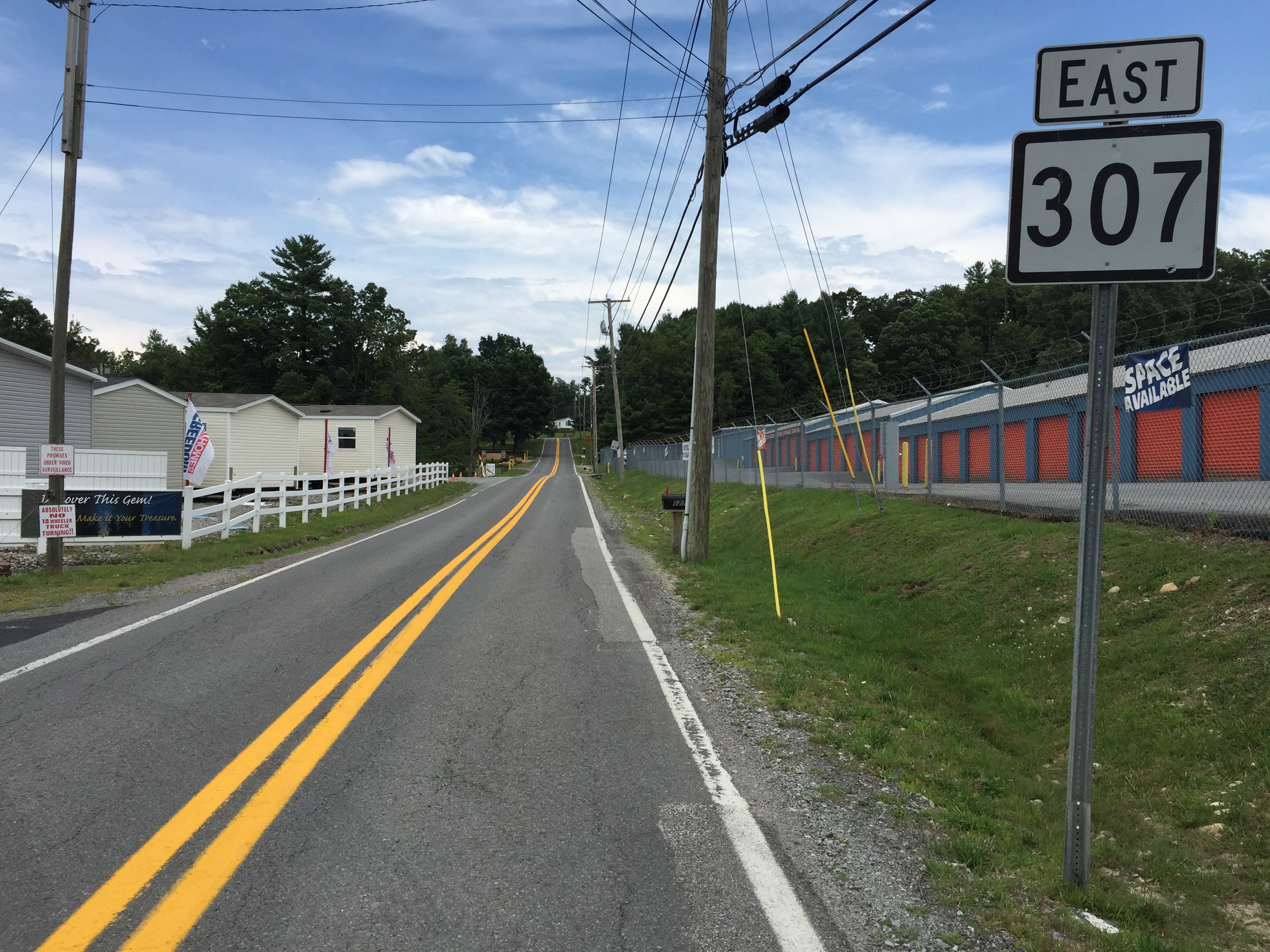

- Location within the state of West Virginia Clifftop (the United States)
- Coordinates: 37°46′17″N 81°7′18″W
- Country: United States
- State: West Virginia
- County: Raleigh
- Elevation: 2,520 ft (770 m)
- Time zone: UTC-5 (Eastern (EST))
  - Summer (DST): UTC-4 (EDT)
- GNIS ID: 1554150

Clifftop is an unincorporated community in Raleigh County, West Virginia, United States.
