= Marcos Martín =

Marcos Martín may refer to:

- Marcos Martín (cartoonist) (born 1972), Spanish comic book artist
- Marcos Martín (footballer) (born 1968), Spanish footballer
