= Camp Washington-Carver Complex =

- U.S. National Register of Historic Places
- U.S. Historic district
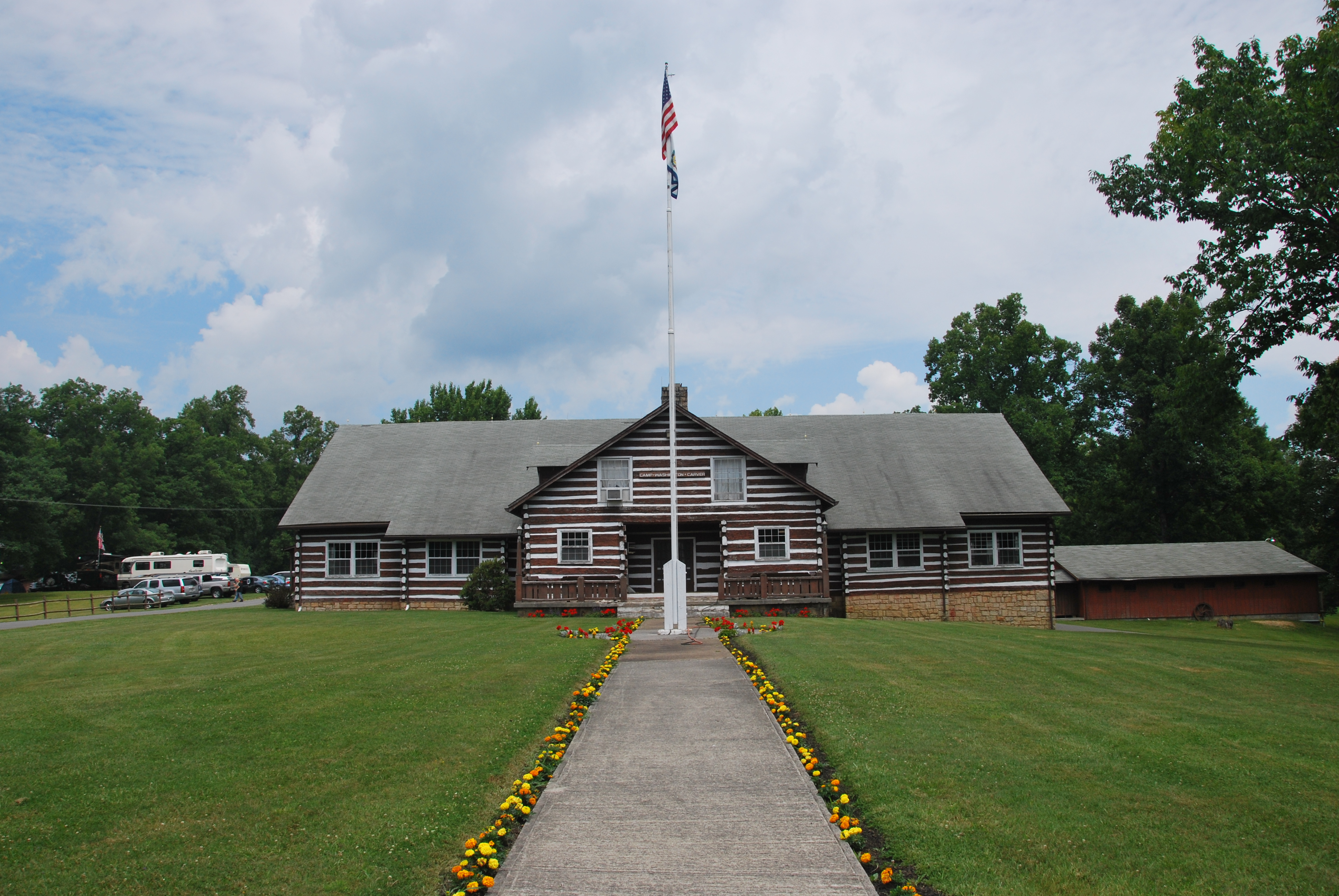
- Great Chestnut Lodge in July 2014

- Location within West Virginia Location within the United States
- Location: County Route 11/3, near Clifftop, West Virginia
- Coordinates: 38°0′36″N 80°58′14″W
- Area: 30 acres (12 ha)
- Built: 1939
- Architect: West Virginia State Board of Control
- Architectural style: Log construction
- NRHP reference No.: 80004017
- Added to NRHP: June 20, 1980

Camp Washington-Carver Complex, formerly known as West Virginia 4-H Camp for Negroes, is a historic camp and national historic district located near Clifftop, Fayette County, West Virginia. The district encompasses four contributing buildings and two contributing structures, the most notable being the Great Chestnut Lodge, a log building of unusual size and structural character. It is the largest log structure built entirely of chestnut in West Virginia. It was built in 1941–1942, and is a 1 1/2-story building in the form of a modified Latin cross with a gabled block (Assembly Hall) and a gabled wing or ell (Dining Hall). Also on the property are a log cottage (1940), two frame dormitories (1942), a water tower (1940), and a small pond (1940). The camp was established by an act of the West Virginia legislature in 1937, and developed as a project of the Works Progress Administration starting in 1939.

It was listed on the National Register of Historic Places in 1980.

== History ==
In 1928, research by Jakes E. Banks and Lulu B. Moore found there were 44 counties with 4-H camps for whites and none with camps for African Americans. John W. Davis, the president of West Virginia State College helped lead efforts to gain state and federal support for the camp. It opened in 1942. Camps in the state were desegregated eventually. The campsite is now a cultural arts center.

A historical marker commemorates its history. The site hosts The Appalachian String Band Music Festival.
