= The Love Coats =

US musical group

The Love Coats were an acoustic rock/pop music group formed in Huntington, West Virginia in August 2004. The band took its name upon suggestion from Jesco White guitarist Jay Hill, who explained the name as "the feeling one feels when enveloped in the false sense of security love provides."

== History ==
The Love Coats were composed of three classical guitar students from Marshall University and a percussionist with marching experience in Drum Corps International. The group experienced moderate success, particularly in 2006 when it performed a private showcase for Atlantic Records executives at the Huntington Music Hall. The Love Coats also briefly toured with notable artists including Blues Traveler and Philadelphia-based Silvertide.

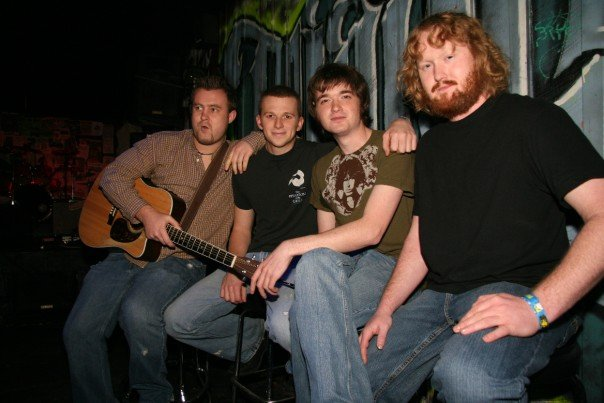
From left: Charlie Davis, Drew Smith, Ian Thornton, Marcus Mullins

The band recorded two full-length LPs -- Under Over You (2005) and Sing To You (2006). Both albums were recorded at Smash Hits Studios in Lavalette, W.V., and received extensive airplay on radio stations including WAMX and WCMI, and television station Network West Virginia in Parkersburg, West Virginia.

The Love Coats also played host to the We Are Marshall premiere party featuring Matthew McConaughey, Matthew Fox and David Strathairn.

== Members ==
- Charlie Davis - acoustic guitar, lead vocals
- Ian Thornton - bass guitar
- Drew Smith - drums, percussion
- Marcus Mullins - lead guitar
