= Melvin Wine =

American fiddle player (1909–2003)

- Born: April 20, 1909; Burnsville, West Virginia, U.S.
- Origin: Copen, West Virginia, U.S.
- Died: March 16, 2003 (aged 93) Braxton County, West Virginia
- Genres: Appalachian, old-time
- Occupation: Musician
- Instrument: Fiddle
- Years active: 1920s–2003
- Labels: Poplar, Marimac

Melvin Wine (April 20, 1909 – March 16, 2003) was an American Appalachian fiddler from the state of West Virginia. He was a lifelong resident of Copen, in Braxton County, West Virginia.

== Early life ==
Wine was born in Burnsville, West Virginia, to Bob Wine, a fiddler, and Elizabeth Sandy, a singer of ballads and hymns. His grandfather John Nelson "Nels" Wine was not a string musician but learned to whistle and sing his father's tunes. The Wine family fiddling tradition began with Melvin's great-grandfather David S. "Smithy" Wine, who was born in 1829.

Melvin Wine dropped out of school in the first grade and was unable to read or write, or to read music. He picked up the fiddle at age nine, while his father was out of the house working as a farmhand. One of the first tunes young Melvin learned was "Bonaparte's Retreat", which he played for his father. His father in turn taught Melvin some of the songs he had learned from his father.

As a teenager, Wine began playing for dances and community gatherings. He also sought out musical mentors from the Central West Virginia region, such as well-known fiddlers John Cogar, Pat Cogar and "Uncle" Jack McElwain. At age 13, Wine won a fiddler's contest held in Gassaway, West Virginia, beating the longtime champion, an older man named Bailey. Mr. Bailey told Melvin he was having a hard time making a living, so Wine gave him the contest prize money.

== Career ==
During the Great Depression, Melvin and his brother Clarence performed together away from Copen in restaurants and bars, and over regional radio. But after only a few months, they returned home to Copen. Melvin took whatever work he could find, including many years as a coal miner and then as a farmer.

As a young adult, Wine was performing at a party where he witnessed a man drop dead after swearing at a woman. Melvin took this as a sign and stopped playing the fiddle for more than 20 years. He picked up the fiddle again decades later, to calm his granddaughter one day while babysitting. He decided that playing the fiddle must be a gift and so he resumed the craft.

While working on his farm, Wine continued to play the fiddle and his reputation in the area grew. Starting in the late 1950s, he performed at the West Virginia State Folk Festival in Glenville, eventually becoming the most frequent winner of that festival's fiddling contest. Since the late 1960s, Wine was regionally well known for his lively style of old-time fiddling. He has also been recognized for his versatility on the fiddle and is "renowned for his deft bow work, and the immensity of his repertoire, including varied melodies and tunes of his youth, many of which date back more than 200 years to the earliest Appalachian settlers".

Melvin Wine played his music for a variety of audiences at venues as diverse as the Smithsonian Institution in Washington, D.C., the Wolf Trap Farm Park near the nation's capitol, Swarthmore College in Pennsylvania, at festivals across West Virginia, as well as a weekly volunteer gig at a Braxton County nursing home, homecomings, and fund raisers in his region.

Wine was also a mentor to many West Virginia fiddlers over the years. He taught for the master-apprentice program at the Augusta Heritage Center at Davis & Elkins College, whose goal was to pass along the largely unwritten canon of pre-Colonial Appalachian music to the next generation. Some of the many younger musicians he has influenced include Jenny Smith and Jake Krack.

Wine and his music was the subject of a 2002 book titled Fiddling Way Out Yonder. A 2011 children's book titled Passing the Music Down was about the relationship between Wine and his protégé Jake Krack, and was the official West Virginia entry into the 2011 National Book Festival.

== Personal life ==
Melvin Wine met and married Etta (pronounced Etty) Singleton in 1930. Etta played banjo and guitar and frequently called square dances. Together they had 10 children, and sometimes took other children into their farmhouse in Copen. On their 120-acre farm, they raised cattle, chicken, and hay.

Etta Wine had a stroke in 1983 and was partially paralyzed as a result. She died in 1992. Melvin was remarried to Anna Wine, who died in 1997. As of 2002, Wine also had 30 grandchildren and 40 great-grandchildren.

As of 1991, Wine had been diagnosed with black lung disease and also suffered from arthritis. Wine died on March 16, 2003, of complications from a stroke, at age 93.

At least one of Wine's children, son Grafton, is also a musician.

== Awards and honors ==
Wine was the first recipient of West Virginia's Vandalia Award, in 1981. The award is presented at the Vandalia Gathering, sponsored by the West Virginia Division of Culture and History, and held on the state Capitol grounds as "a free celebration of the arts, music, crafts, and food that reflect West Virginia's heritage".

Wine was a recipient of a 1991 National Heritage Fellowship awarded by the National Endowment for the Arts, which is the United States government's highest honor in the folk and traditional arts.

== Discography ==
=== Solo albums ===
- Cold Frosty Morning: Traditional Fiddle Tunes from Braxton County, West Virginia (1976, Poplar Records LP-1; reissued 2001 by Roane Records)
- Hannah at the Springhouse (1989, Marimac Recordings AHS #2; reissued 1999 by Augusta Heritage Recordings AHR 021R)
- Vintage Wine (1993, Marimac Recordings AHS#6)

=== Various artist compilation albums ===
Album title	Record label	Stock number	Release year	Song title(s)
Visits	Heritage Records	33	1981	”Jump Jim Crow”
The Music Never Dies	Elderberry Records	ER 004	1988	"Calhoun Swing"
Old-Time Fiddling of Braxton County:Volume II	Augusta Heritage Productions	AHR-013	1992	”I Don't Love Nobody”
Old-Time Fiddling of Braxton County:Volume II	Augusta Heritage Productions	AHR-013	1992	”New Orleans”
Old-Time Fiddling of Braxton County:Volume II	Augusta Heritage Productions	AHR-013	1992	”Clarence's Tune”
Old-Time Fiddling of Braxton County:Volume II	Augusta Heritage Productions	AHR-013	1992	“Charleston Girls”
Old-Time Fiddling of Braxton County:Volume II	Augusta Heritage Productions	AHR-013	1992	“Dirty Sheets”
Old-Time Fiddling of Braxton County:Volume II	Augusta Heritage Productions	AHR-013	1992	“Boatin' Up Sandy”
Folk Music & Lore of the Civil War (also issued on cassette with title Folk Music of the Civil War)	Augusta Heritage Recordings	AHR-022	1994	"Stacked Them Up In Piles"
Folk Music & Lore of the Civil War (also issued on cassette with title Folk Music of the Civil War)	Augusta Heritage Recordings	AHR-022	1994	"Old Dan Tucker"
The Appalachian String Band Music Festival" Clifftop, West Virginia	Chubby Dragon Records	CD1001	1995	"Tippy Get Your Hair Cut"
Cajun, Zydeco, Blues, and Swing	Augusta Heritage Center	Augusta Concert Souvenirs #1	1995	"The Rainy Day"
Seedtime on the Cumberland: Volume III, Music From 1987-1994	June Appal Recordings	JA0074CD	1998	"Bob Wine's Tune"
Music in the Air Somewhere: The Shifting Borders of West Virginia's Fiddle and Song Traditions	West Virginia University Press Sound Archives	7	2006	"No Never Alone"
Music in the Air Somewhere: The Shifting Borders of West Virginia's Fiddle and Song Traditions	West Virginia University Press Sound Archives	7	2006	"Stacked 'Em Up In Piles"
Music in the Air Somewhere: The Shifting Borders of West Virginia's Fiddle and Song Traditions	West Virginia University Press Sound Archives	7	2006	"I Don't Love Nobody""
Classic Old-Time Fiddle	Smithsonian Folkways	SFW CD 40193	2007	"Yew Piney Mountain"
Legends of Old-Time Music: Fifty Years of County Records	County Records	CD-6001	2015	"Cold Frosty Morning"
Legends of Old-Time Music: Fifty Years of County Records	County Records	CD-6001	2015	"Moon Behind the Hill""

== See also ==
- Milnes, Gerald (1999). Play of a Fiddle: Traditional Music, Dance, and Folklore in West Virginia. Lexington, KY: University Press of Kentucky. ISBN 978-0-8131-9326-7. OCLC 897137425.
- Music of West Virginia
