= Tennessee Fall Homecoming =

Coordinates: 36.1815°N 84.0687°W

Tennessee Fall Homecoming is the popular fall (autumn) festival of the Museum of Appalachia, a four-day event held annually on the second full weekend of October. Homecoming features continuous performances on five different stages of traditional music ranging from gospel to bluegrass for the duration of the event. Over a quarter-century old, its headliners have included Doc Watson, Ralph Stanley, Mac Wiseman, Janette Carter, Rhonda Vincent, Bitt Rouse, and Doyle Lawson and Quicksilver.

Each year over 175 artisans - some of whom do not sell in other venues - exhibit and sell old-time Appalachian crafts. Demonstrations range from paper being made from milkweed to apple sulfuring (a method of preserving fruit by exposing slices to sulfur smoke, which kills bacteria).

Other activities include buck dancing and clogging. Visitors can participate in daily hymn singing in the Museum's 19th-century log "Church in the Wildwood." Dozens of local ladies and food vendors serve country food on the grounds every day, some of it prepared on woodburning stoves and in iron kettles.

Approximately 50,000 visitors attend some part of the four-day event. Special admission rates apply.
