= Nicut, West Virginia =

- Unincorporated community
- Location within the state of West Virginia Nicut (the United States)
- Coordinates: 38°42′47″N 81°1′19″W
- Country: United States
- State: West Virginia
- County: Calhoun
- Elevation: 856 ft (261 m)
- Time zone: UTC-5 (Eastern (EST))
  - Summer (DST): UTC-4 (EDT)
- ZIP codes: 26633
- GNIS ID: 1549852

Nicut is an unincorporated community in Calhoun County, West Virginia, United States.

The community has existed since at least the 1850s.

== Notable people ==
- Jake Krack, old-time fiddler
- Lester McCumbers, old-time fiddler
