= Bascom Lamar Lunsford =

American lawyer, folklorist, and musician (1882–1973)

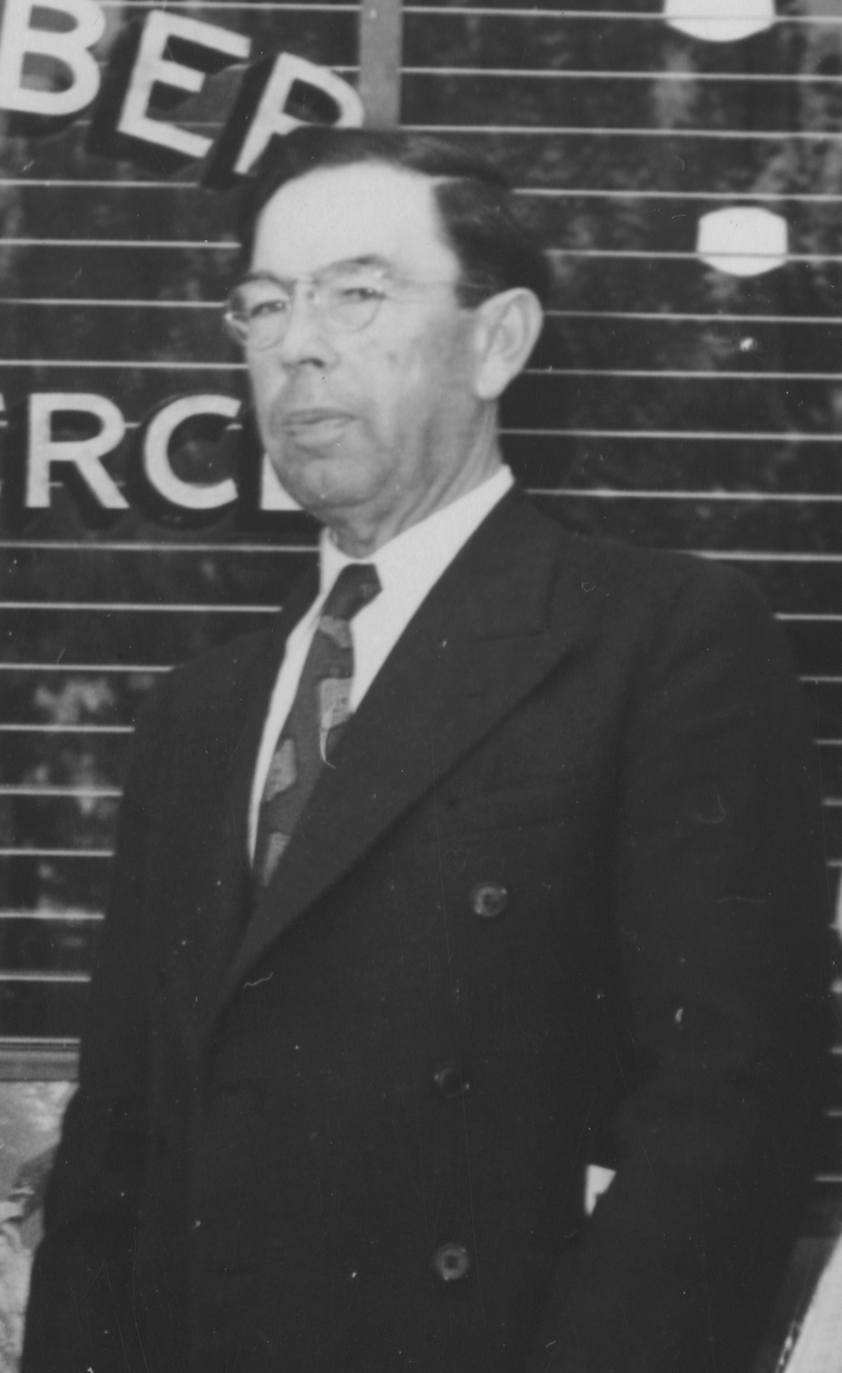
- Born: March 21, 1882; Mars Hill, North Carolina
- Died: September 4, 1973 (aged 91)
- Other name: Minstrel of the Appalachians
- Education: Rutherford College
- Occupations: folklorist, lawyer
- Spouses: Nellie Triplett; Freda Metcalf
- Parent(s): James Bassett Lunsford, Luarta Leah Buckner

Bascom Lamar Lunsford (March 21, 1882 – September 4, 1973) was a folklorist, performer of traditional Appalachian music, and lawyer from western North Carolina. He was often known by the nickname "Minstrel of the Appalachians".

== Biography ==
Bascom Lamar Lunsford was born at Mars Hill, Madison County, North Carolina in 1882, into the world of traditional Appalachian folk music. At an early age, his father, a teacher, gave him a fiddle, and his mother sang religious songs and traditional ballads. Lunsford also learned banjo and began to perform at weddings and square dances.

After qualifying as a teacher at Rutherford College, Lunsford taught at schools in Madison County. In 1913, Lunsford qualified in law at Trinity College, later to become Duke University. He began to travel and collect material at the start of the 20th century, often meeting singers on isolated farms. Lunsford has been quoted as saying he spent "nights in more homes from Harpers Ferry to Iron Mountain than anybody but God".

== Appalachian music ==
Lunsford gave lectures and performances while dressed in a starched white shirt and black bow tie. This formal dress was part of his campaign against the stereotyping of "hillbillies".

In 1922 Frank C. Brown, a song collector, recorded 32 items on wax cylinders from Bascom. In 1928, Lunsford recorded "Jesse James" and "I Wish I Was a Mole in the Ground" for the Brunswick record label. Harry Smith included "I Wish I Was a Mole in the Ground" on his Anthology of American Folk Music in 1952. Smith's anthology also includes Lunsford's performance of the gospel song "Dry Bones", recorded in 1928.

Lunsford played in a style from Western North Carolina, which had a rhythmic up-stroke brushing the strings. It sounds similar to clawhammer banjo playing, which emphasises the downstroke. He also played a "mandoline", an instrument with mandolin body and a five-string banjo neck. He occasionally played fiddle for dance tunes such as "Rye Straw". He censored the canon, avoiding obscene songs or omitting verses. His repertoire included Child Ballads, negro spirituals and parlor songs. A CD collection of Lunsford's recordings, from the Brunswick recordings of the 1920s to the recordings for the Archive of American Folk Song at the Library of Congress in 1949, Ballads, Banjo Tunes and Sacred Songs of Western North Carolina, was released by Smithsonian Folkways Records in 1996.

== The Mountain Dance and Folk Festival ==
In 1927 the Asheville Chamber of Commerce organized a 'Rhododendron Festival' to encourage tourism. The Chamber asked Lunsford to invite local musicians and dancers. 1928 was the first year of the Mountain Dance and Folk Festival, often claimed as the first event to be described as a "Folk Festival". After a few years the rhododendron element disappeared but the festival continues to this day. He was the organiser and performed there every year until he suffered a stroke in 1965.

Lunsford cofounded the Bascom Lamar Lunsford "Minstrel of Appalachia" Festival, taking place at Lunsford's birthplace at Mars Hill University in Mars Hill, North Carolina, just 20 minutes north of Asheville.

== Politics and fame ==
Bascom was involved in the politics of the Democratic Party. He managed the campaign for Congressman Zebulon Weaver for North Carolina. From 1931 to 1934 he was a reading clerk of the North Carolina House of Representatives. Charles Seeger employed him in the mid-30s to promote singers in "Skyline Farms", as part of the "New Deal". Lunsford was invited to the White House by President Roosevelt in 1939, when he performed his music for King George VI.

== Personal ==
Lunsford married Nellie Sarah Triplett (June 22, 1881 – May 4, 1960). They had six daughters (Sarah, Ellen, Lynn, Nellie, Merton & Josefa) and one son (Blackwell). After Nellie's death Lunsford married Freda English née Metcalf (1913–1974). Bascom Lunsford died on 4 September 1973. Fifteen months after Bascom's death, Freda took her own life.

== Influence ==
In 1964, the North Carolina fantasy and horror writer Manly Wade Wellman dedicated his book "Who Fears the Devil?" to Lunsford. Wellman's fictional protagonist, Silver John, was an Appalachian folk singer, like Lunsford.

Bob Dylan, who listened to the Anthology of American Folk Music, echoed a line from "I Wish I Was a Mole In the Ground." Lunsford sang, "'Cause a railroad man they'll kill you when he can / And drink up your blood like wine," which is echoed by Dylan's line "Mona tried to tell me / To stay away from the train line / She said that all the railroad men / Just drink up your blood like wine" on his song "Stuck Inside of Mobile With the Memphis Blues Again", recorded in 1966 for the album Blonde on Blonde.

Greil Marcus discussed the meaning of "I Wish I Was a Mole In the Ground" both in his liner notes to Bob Dylan and The Band's album, The Basement Tapes (1975), and in his book Lipstick Traces.

Lunsford's original recording of "Good Old Mountain Dew" was used as the first advertising theme for the newly created Mountain Dew soda. He sold the rights to the song for a train ticket home.

In 1964 Lunsford was the subject of a documentary film, shot with a 16mm hand held camera, by New York City filmmaker, David Hoffman.

== Discography ==
- Song and Ballads of American History and of the Assassination of American Presidents (1952)
- Smokey Mountain Ballads (1953) (Folkways)
- Minstrel of the Appalachians (1956) (Riverside: RLP 12-645)
- Music from South Turkey Creek (w/ George Pegram and Walter “Red” Parham) (1976) (Rounder Records)
- Ballads, Banjo Tunes and Sacred Songs of Western North Carolina (1996) (Smithsonian Folkways)
