= Mountain Dance and Folk Festival =

Annual American folk festival

The Mountain Dance and Folk Festival, held annually in Asheville, North Carolina, is the oldest continuously running folk festival in the United States.

== History ==
Started initially by Bascom Lamar Lunsford as an offshoot of the larger Asheville Rhododendron Festival in 1928, the festival started on its own in 1930. In 1967, the festival was taken over by Asheville's Folk Heritage Committee. The festival starts on the first Thursday in August and continues through the following Friday and Saturday. Other modern festivals, such as the National Folk Festival, were inspired by the Mountain Dance and Folk Festival.

In its early years, the festival hosted artists such as Samantha Bumgarner. Pete Seeger was inspired to play banjo after hearing founder Bascom Lamar Lunsford play the five-string banjo at the festival in 1936.
