= Clifftop, Fayette County, West Virginia =

Unincorporated community in West Virginia, United States

- Unincorporated community
- Location within West Virginia Location within the United States
- Coordinates: 38°0′15″N 80°56′38″W
- Country: United States
- State: West Virginia
- County: Fayette
- Time zone: UTC-5 (Eastern (EST))
  - Summer (DST): UTC-4 (EDT)

Clifftop is an unincorporated community in Fayette County, West Virginia, United States.

== Attractions ==
It is the home of historic Camp Washington-Carver Complex, which hosts the Appalachian String Band Music Festival the first weekend in August. This community is also home of Babcock State Park.
