= National Register of Historic Places listings in Wirt County, West Virginia =

Location of Wirt County in West Virginia

This is a list of the National Register of Historic Places listings in Wirt County, West Virginia.

This is intended to be a complete list of the properties and districts on the National Register of Historic Places in Wirt County, West Virginia, United States. The locations of National Register properties and districts for which the latitude and longitude coordinates are included below, may be seen in a Google map.

There are 6 properties and districts listed on the National Register in the county.

This National Park Service list is complete through NPS recent listings posted March 21, 2025.

Contents: Counties in West Virginia

Barbour - Berkeley - Boone - Braxton - Brooke - Cabell - Calhoun - Clay - Doddridge - Fayette - Gilmer - Grant - Greenbrier - Hampshire - Hancock - Hardy - Harrison - Jackson - Jefferson - Kanawha - Lewis - Lincoln - Logan - Marion - Marshall - Mason - McDowell - Mercer - Mineral - Mingo - Monongalia - Monroe - Morgan - Nicholas - Ohio - Pendleton - Pleasants - Pocahontas - Preston - Putnam - Raleigh - Randolph - Ritchie - Roane - Summers - Taylor - Tucker - Tyler - Upshur - Wayne - Webster - Wetzel - Wirt - Wood - Wyoming

== Current listings ==
	Name on the Register	Image	Date listed	Location	City or town	Description
1	Beauchamp-Newman House	Beauchamp-Newman House	July 24, 1974 (#74002021)	Court St. 39°03′52″N 81°23′37″W	Elizabeth	
2	Buffalo Church	Buffalo Church	January 29, 1990 (#89001781)	Junction of County Routes 14 and 28; 38°57′58″N 81°25′16″W	Palestine	
3	Burning Springs Complex	Burning Springs Complex	May 6, 1971 (#71000884)	Along the northern bank of the Kanawha River from the confluence of Burning Springs Run; 38°59′31″N 81°19′11″W	Burning Springs	
4	Kanawha Hotel	Kanawha Hotel	November 25, 1986 (#86003232)	111 Court St. 39°03′52″N 81°23′36″W	Elizabeth	
5	Ruble Church	Ruble Church	April 9, 1982 (#82004332)	Junction of CR 34/1 and 34/2; 39°00′07″N 81°18′29″W	Burning Springs	
6	Wirt County Courthouse	Wirt County Courthouse	August 25, 2004 (#04000918)	Washington St. 39°03′49″N 81°23′39″W	Elizabeth	

== See also ==
- List of National Historic Landmarks in West Virginia
- National Register of Historic Places listings in West Virginia
