= 11th West Virginia Infantry Regiment =

- Flag of West Virginia
- Active: October 29, 1861, to June 17, 1865
- Country: United States
- Allegiance: Union
- Branch: Infantry
- Engagements: Battle of Cloyd's Mountain; Second Battle of Kernstown; Battle of Cedar Creek; Battle of Fisher's Hill; Siege of Petersburg

The 11th West Virginia Infantry Regiment was an infantry regiment that served in the Union Army during the American Civil War.

== Service ==
The 11th West Virginia Infantry Regiment was organized in several western Virginia counties along the Ohio River following the Wheeling Convention and their secession from secessionist Virginia, including Elizabeth and Burning Springs in Wirt County, Wheeling for Ohio County Wetzel and Marshall Counties, Ravenswood in Jackson County, Kanawha Station in Wood County, and Point Pleasant in Mason County between October 29, 1861, and October 8, 1862.

It initially protected the Baltimore and Ohio Railroad, a crucial supply line for Union forces that connected Ohio and the midwest with Baltimore and Washington D.C. along the Ohio and later Potomac Rivers through Western Virginia, and was based at Parkersburg. In January 1863, its initial Colonel, John C. Rathbone was honorably discharged, and the following month its initial Lt.Col., Daniel E. Frost, succeeded him. In March 1863 the 11th West Virginia was assigned to the 6th Brigade (Wilkinson's), 3rd Division (Kelley's or Scammon's) of the 8th Army Corps and countered the Jones-Imboden Raid shortly before West Virginia achieved statehood and Morgan's Raid in July 1863. In December 1863 it was attached to 3rd Brigade, 2nd Division, West Virginia and the following month many members reenlisted. Following the Battle of Cloyd's Mountain on May 9, 1864, Col. H.G. Sickel specifically mentioned the gallantry of Col. Frost and his regiment. In June 1864 it accompanied General David Hunter in raiding in the Shenandoah Valley including sacking the Virginia Military Institute and returning along the Kanawha Valley (marching 412 miles by month's and losing one officer and five men). On July 13, 1864, Col. Frost was leading the brigade at the battle of Snicker's Ferry and fell mortally wounded.

The unit then supported General Philip Sheridan's campaign, including at the Second Battle of Kernstown outside Winchester. Private George G. Moore of Company D was awarded the Medal of Honor for gallantry at the Battle of Fisher's Hill for capturing a Confederate battle flag. Col. Van H. Bukey, who had begun the war as the unit's major and who had commanded the regiment after Col. Frost's death, was formally promoted to the unit's colonel following the victory at the Battle of Cedar Creek on October 9, 1864.

The unit was reassigned to the Army of the Potomac in March 1865 and participated in the Appomattox Campaign at the war's end. Corporal Adam White of Company G, was awarded the Medal of Honor for his exceptional heroism in charging the Rebel works, routing the enemy and capturing a brigade flag. This was during the breakthrough at Hatcher's Run during the Siege of Petersburg, Virginia on April 2, 1865.

The 11th West Virginia participated in Gen. Lee's surrender at Appomattox Court House and conducted various cleanup operations in central Virginia before being mustered out in Richmond on June 17, 1865.

== Casualties ==
The 11th West Virginia suffered 4 Officers and 63 enlisted men killed in battle or died from wounds, and 148 enlisted men dead from disease for a total of 215 fatalities.

== Colonels ==
- Colonel John C. Rathbone, 1861–1863 (discharged)
- Colonel Daniel E. Frost, 1863–1864 (killed in action)
- Colonel Van H. Bukey, 1864–1865

== See also ==
- West Virginia Units in the Civil War
- West Virginia in the Civil War
