= West Virginia Route 53 =

State highway in West Virginia, United States

West Virginia Route 53

Route information
- Maintained by WVDOH
- Length: 9.8 mi (15.8 km)

Major junctions
- West end: WV 5 near Elizabeth
- East end: WV 47 near Cisco

Location
- Country: United States
- State: West Virginia
- Counties: Wirt, Ritchie

Highway system
- West Virginia State Highway System; Interstate; US; State
← US 52	→ WV 54

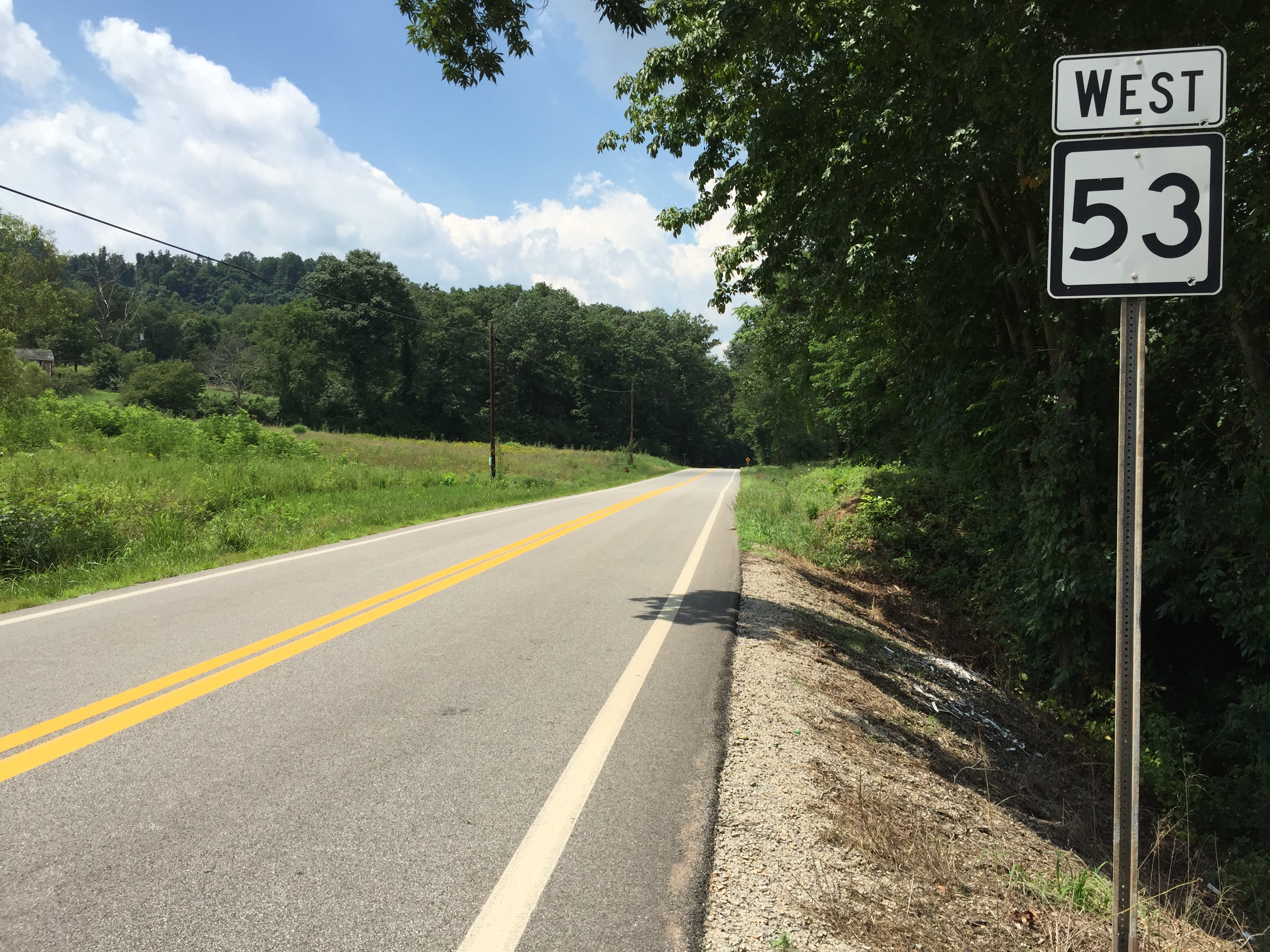
View west along WV 53 west of CR 6 just east of Elizabeth

West Virginia Route 53 is an east–west state highway in northwest West Virginia. The western terminus of the route is at West Virginia Route 5 outside Elizabeth. The eastern terminus is at West Virginia Route 47 two miles (3 km) southeast of Cisco.

== Major intersections ==
County	Location	mi	km	Destinations	Notes
Wirt				WV 5	
Ritchie				WV 47 – Parkersburg, Smithville	
1.000 mi = 1.609 km; 1.000 km = 0.621 mi
