= West Virginia Route 47 =

State highway in West Virginia, United States

West Virginia Route 47

Route information
- Maintained by WVDOH
- Length: 62.5 mi (100.6 km)

Major junctions
- West end: WV 618 in Parkersburg
- US 50 in Parkersburg; I-77 near Parkersburg; WV 16 in Smithville
- East end: US 33 / US 119 in Linn

Location
- Country: United States
- State: West Virginia
- Counties: Wood; Wirt; Ritchie; Gilmer

Highway system
- West Virginia State Highway System; Interstate; US; State
← WV 46	→ US 48

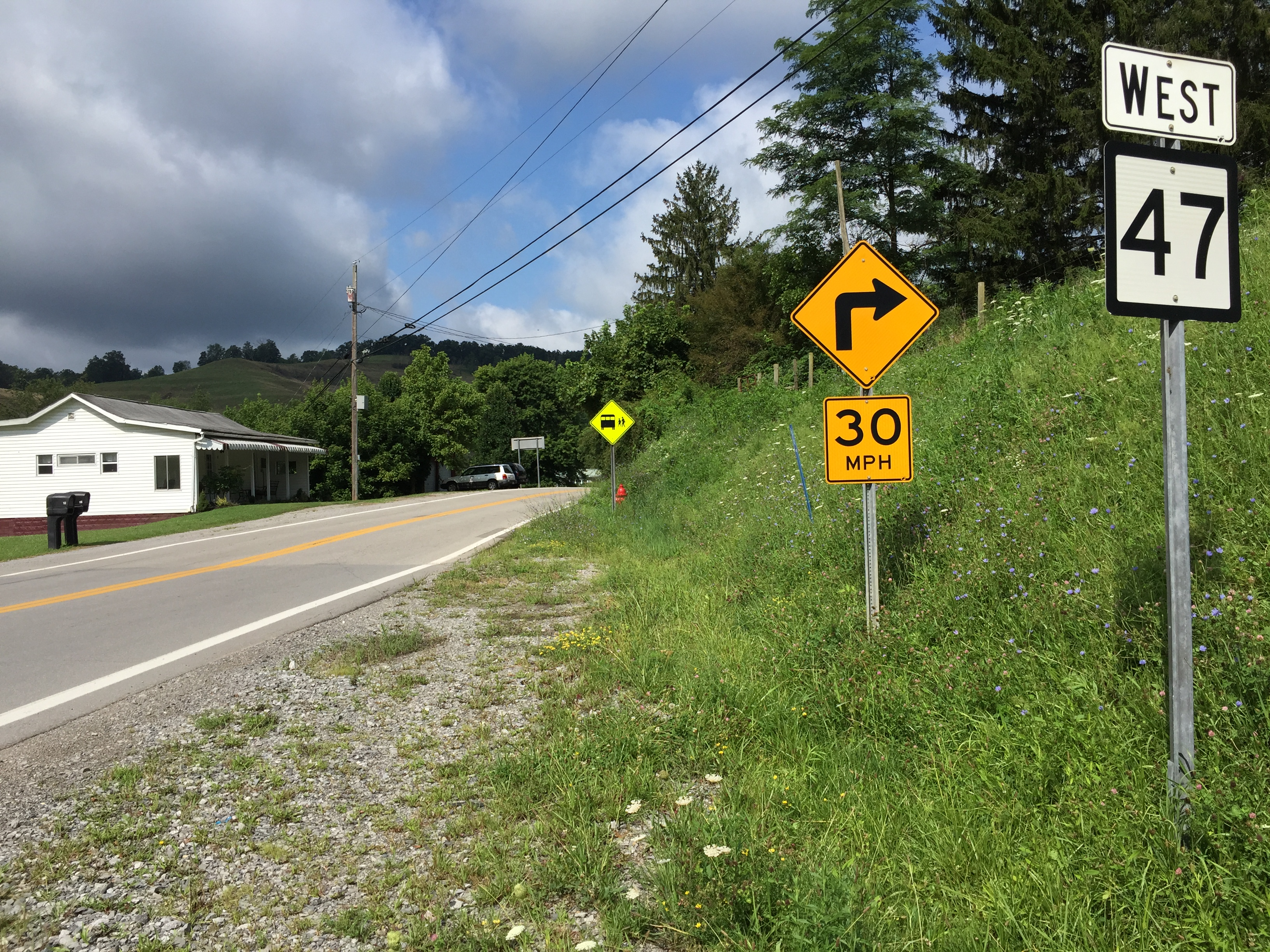
View west along WV 47 at US 33/US 119 in Linn, July 2017

West Virginia Route 47 is an east–west state highway in northern West Virginia. The western terminus of the route is at WV 618 (former US 50) in Parkersburg. The eastern terminus is at U.S. Route 33 and U.S. Route 119 in Linn.

== Major intersections ==
County	Location	mi	km	Destinations	Notes
Wood	Parkersburg			WV 618 (7th Street)	Western terminus
Wood				US 50 to I-77 north – Clarksburg, Athens, OH	interchange
Wood				I-77 / WV 2 – Marietta, OH, Charleston	I-77 Exit 174
Ritchie				WV 53 west – Elizabeth	
Ritchie	Smithville			WV 16 north – Harrisville	West end of WV 16 overlap
Ritchie	Smithville			WV 16 south – Grantsville	East end of WV 16 overlap
Gilmer	Coxs Mills			WV 74 north	
Gilmer				WV 18 north	
Gilmer	Linn			US 33 / US 119 – Weston, Glenville	Eastern terminus
1.000 mi = 1.609 km; 1.000 km = 0.621 mi: Concurrency terminus

== See also ==
- List of state highways in West Virginia
- List of highways numbered 47
