= Daniel E. Frost =

American politician

Daniel Frost

Speaker of the House of Delegates of the Restored Government of Virginia
- In office July 1, 1861 – May 15, 1862
- Preceded by: n/a
- Succeeded by: George McC. Porter

Member of the West Virginia House of Delegates from the Jackson and Roane Counties district
- In office July 1, 1861 – May 15, 1862
- Preceded by: n/a
- Succeeded by: D.J. Keeney

Member of the Virginia House of Delegates from the Jackson County district
- In office Wheeling Convention of May 1861

Member of the Virginia House of Delegates from the Jackson and Roane Counties district
- In office December 5, 1859 – April 1861
- Preceded by: J.H. Chase
- Succeeded by: n/a

Member of the Virginia House of Delegates from the Jackson County district
- In office December 3, 1855 – December 6, 1857
- Preceded by: M. Gallahue
- Succeeded by: J.H. Chase

Personal details
- Born: February 23, 1819 St. Clairsville, Ohio US
- Died: July 19, 1864 (aged 45) Clarke County, Virginia, US
- Party: Republican
- Spouse: Ellen Rathbone
- Profession: Politician, editor, farmer, soldier
- Awards: conspicuous gallantry

Military service
- Allegiance: United States
- Branch/service: Union Army
- Years of service: 1862–64
- Rank: Colonel
- Commands: 11th West Virginia Infantry Regiment
- Battles/wars: American Civil War: Battle of Cloyd's Mountain; Battle of Snicker's Gap

Daniel Edward Frost (February 23, 1819 – July 19, 1864) was an American journalist, politician and soldier who twice served in the Virginia House of Delegates before the American Civil War. He helped found the state of West Virginia at the Wheeling Convention where he represented Jackson County and served as Speaker of the House of Delegates for the Virginia General Assembly at Wheeling, before he died fighting for the Union while leading the 11th West Virginia Infantry Regiment.

== Early and family life ==
Born in St. Clairsville, on the National Road across the Ohio River and about 10 miles west of Wheeling in Belmont County, Ohio to Frederick County, Virginia-born William Frost (1791–1854) and his wife Rachel Rebecca Wetzel (niece of Ohio Valley pioneer and Indian fighter Lewis Wetzel). He had nine siblings.

Educated in the local Ohio public schools before the family moved to Ravenswood, Virginia, Daniel Frost married 17-year old Eleanor "Ellen" Sophia Rathbone on July 13, 1843, in Parkersburg, Wood County (then in Virginia). Her father, William Palmer Rathbone (1764–1862), had been a paymaster for the U.S. Army during the War of 1812, as well as a shipbuilder, New York city councilman and New Jersey judge, before moving to Virginia with his sons and drilling oil wells in what became Wirt and Roane Counties.

Their son Lt. Bushrod Taylor Frost (1844–1910) would fight under his father and eventually move to Indiana. Other sons were Daniel V. Frost (1848–1924; who moved to Illinois) and Arthur M. Frost (1855–1917; who moved to Indiana); the family also included daughters M.A. Frost (b. 1857) and Catherine Frost Wickham of Pittsburgh, Pennsylvania.

== Career ==
=== Editor and politician ===
William Frost St. moved his family, including Daniel Frost, across and downstream on the Ohio River to Ravenswood, Virginia where the patriarch farmed until his death in 1856. His son William Frost Jr. founded the Virginia Chronicle, Jackson County's first newspaper, in 1853 and within five years Daniel Frost bought the paper as his brother moved westward after their father's death. Two printers and a domestic servant also lived with Daniel Frost's family by 1860.

Voters from Jackson County elected Daniel Frost to the Virginia House of Delegates in 1855 and again in 1859 (a part-time position and when the seat also formally represented Roane County which had been created during his first term in 1856). He served for one term each time, being defeated then defeating J. H. Chase.

Like his father-in-law but unlike some of his brothers, Frost was a strong Union man. However, Jackson county voters had not cast a single vote for Abraham Lincoln in 1860; instead Breckenridge received 500 votes, Bell 388 votes and Douglas 61 votes. When Virginians were asked to vote oto approve the secession convention's recommendation in May 1861, 776 voters in Jackson county opposed secession and only 460 voted for it, though secessionists carried the state as a whole.

His brothers did not share his Union sentiments. His eldest brother Amos Frost, a merchant, moved from Ravenswood to Colorado in the spring 1861, just before the American Civil War, William P. Frost Jr. had learned the printing business in Columbus Ohio, but by the 1860 census was a printer in Mexico (the county seat of Audrain County, Missouri), and a decade later still lived in Audrain County and worked as a printer. His youngest brother, John L. Frost, also appears as a printer in Mexico, Missouri in 1860, and in the 1870 and 1880 censuses before his death lived across the Mississippi River in Quincy, Illinois working first as a typesetter, then a newspaper reporter. Griffin Frost had married in Marion County, Missouri across from Quincy, Illinois in 1857 and likewise become a journalist (first in Mexico, then Shelbyville, Missouri) before joining the CSA First Missouri Guards (in September 1862 and rising to the rank of Captain before becoming a prisoner of war). He later edited the Knox County (Missouri) Democrat and lived his final years with his daughter Annie in Siloam Springs, Arkansas.

=== West Virginia founder and soldier ===
Nonetheless, Daniel Frost participated in the Wheeling Convention as one of five delegates from Jackson County at the initial session, alongside James F. Scott, Andrew Flesher, Andrew Jackson and James A. Smith, when future Governor and Senator Arthur Boreman presided. In the July, 1861 session and sessions from December 2, 1861 – February 13, 1862 and May 6–15, 1862, Frost represented Jackson and Roane counties (Roane county having sent no delegate to the Wheeling Convention), and fellow delegates elected him as their Speaker. Meanwhile, many Confederates had left Jackson County, but so did men fighting for the Union, so that when residents were asked to vote on the ordinance ceding from Virginia, only 226 men voted in Jackson County (and only one voted against the ordinance) compared to 1,236 votes cast in the May 1861 election.

Frost resigned his legislative seat for military service at some time after the May 15, 1862 Confederate raid on Ravenswood, so George McC. Porter of Hancock County replaced Frost as Speaker, and Ravenswood wharf master D.J. Keeney replaced him as the delegate for Jackson and Roane counties for the extra legislative session from December 4, 1862 – February 5, 1863. Frost became the Lieutenant colonel of the 11th West Virginia Infantry Regiment, then led by his brother-in-law Col. John Castelli ("Cass) Rathbone, who as a civilian managed the oil company developing Burning Springs.

During CSA Gen. Albert G. Jenkins' Roane and Jackson County raid in September 1862, Confederate raiders seized Spencer (the Roane County seat) on September 2, in part because Col. Rathbone who was commanding five companies of the 11th West Virginia failed to heed General B. Kelley's warnings of their advance, so his men awoke with Confederates pointing guns at them (and fled to the woods or towards Parkersburg, and Rathbone soon surrendered with 200 men and was paroled by Jenkins). The advancing Confederates then arrived in Ripley, the Jackson County seat, where they again faced no opposition. They continued to Ravenswood and burned Frost's shop (either because of his pro-Union activities or "by accident"), as well as several other businesses. Confederates would also raid Ravenswood for the third time on May 16, 1863.

While Rathbone was in Spencer, Lt.Col. Frost remained in Jackson County, guarding the Ripley and Charleston roads. He and other men from the 11th West Virginia chased after Jenkins's cavalry across the Ohio River, but found they never reached Gallipolis, Ohio and so returned to defend Parkersburg, the seat of Wood County and perhaps Virginia's most important Ohio River port after Wheeling. From Wheeling, Governor Pierpont sent more men to defend Parkersburg, and Frost took command of the soldiers who had retreated from Spencer to the city.

Although the documents of the U.S. Army investigation of the Spencer incident were lost, rumors abounded that Rathbone had reached a deal to protect his oil field. Thus, after his release, Rathbone was only allowed to supervise suspected Confederate sympathizers imprisoned in Ohio, then was dismissed from the service on January 6, 1863, reportedly for cowardice during the Spencer incident. Papers documenting the revocation of that dismissal by President Johnson in 1866 were also lost. Although Rathbone was later reimbursed for funds he had spent outfitting the 11th West Virginia Infantry and Company C of the 1st West Virginia Cavalry, he was a broken man by this and the burning of his family's oil fields at Burning Springs the following July, and after the war moved to Kansas, where he died not long afterward.

Meanwhile, promoted to lead the 11th West Virginia, Col. Frost defended Parkersburg from September 1862 until the arrival of the 126th Ohio Regiment and Col. G.W. McCook. Frost also recruited Company F of the 3rd West Virginia Cavalry at Parkersburg in November 1862, eventually deploying it on scout duty in Wood, Jackson and Wirt counties. However, first they guarded Camp Union, the Parkersburg depots, as well as road trans between Parkersburg and the Ohio River, while Captain W.K. Flesher recruited Company H of the Third (West) Virginia Cavalry patrolled the roads from Parkersburg to Ripley, Ravenswood and Belleville and would eventually be attached to the 23rd Ohio Infantry. By the fall of 1862, Confederate raiders had wrecked the railroad from Parkersburg to Doddridge County, increasing the burden on the east/west Wheeling railroad line; plus traffic had virtually ceased on the Northwestern and Staunton Pikes, on which the Moccasin Raiders and Night Hawk Raiders were often seen, although after General B. F. Kelley was assigned to rebuild the railroad that winter, the job got done.

Meanwhile, Frost also maintained a military station at Ravenswood, where some Confederate sympathizers objected to his efforts to get them to take the loyalty oath, particularly if they returned to the area as had Mrs. Henrietta Barr, whose four brothers had all enlisted in the Confederate States Army. Frost feared vandalism and other bushwhacking activities. A few Union cavalrymen patrolled north of Ripley that fall and winter; sufficient patrols to support mail service to Ripley would not begin until the summer of 1863, when Capt. William Logsdon organized the State Scouts.

Frost received his formal commission as colonel on February 11, 1863, and was then again appointed to lead Parkersburg's defenses. He replaced Lt. Col. John F. Hoy of the 6th West Virginia Infantry in March 1863, in part because Hoy's son had been dismissed for Confederate sympathies and because Arthur Boreman wrote Gov. Pierpont on March 2 that Ritchie County railroad bridges were burned the previous night and secessionists claimed Hoy proposed to allow them including Sherrad Clemens to speak in Parkersburg. Thus Clemens's proposed speech in Middlebourne, the Tyler County seat on March 9 was prevented and Frost cleared Wirt County boatmen from Parkersburg on March 12, eventually preventing a proposed anti-New State convention being called by (former militia General) John Jay Jackson (Wood County's most powerful politician). As West Virginia voters overwhelmingly voted for statehood in late March 1863 (President Lincoln recognizing the vote in April and stating that statehood would occur 60 days later in June, 1863), the "Moccasin Rangers" would be organized formally within the 19th Virginia Cavalry (under CSA Col. then (Gen.) John Imboden and William Lowther Jackson of Parkersburg). Furthermore, the "Night Hawk Rangers" of Parkersburg started by Capt. James S. Alexander Crawford would become Company F of the 17th Virginia Cavalry. All noticed horses seized by Confederate raiders in the mountains, which supported a Confederate buildup in the spring of 1863. Thus Captain Flesher's cavalry was sent to Sutton based on rumors the invaders would cross there and proceed to Weston. Outposts in Roane, Wirt and Jackson Counties (even Ravenswood) were temporarily abandoned, which exacerbated bridge-burning by Confederate troops. Frost declared martial law in Wood County on April 20. Peter Van Winkle's son Rathbone Van Winkle recruited between 500 and 1000 men in Parkersburg for the 113th Virginia militia. Meanwhile, the Jones Imboden Raid began by capturing Rowlesburg and Kingwood in Preston County as well as Oakland, Maryland; and Fairmont in Marion County surrendered on April 29, with Union General Roberts retreating to Clarksburg. As Imboden's offensive began, Pierpont had been slow to realize the danger, and Frost feared a southwestern invasion. He asked for 3000 men to defend the railroad, 500 additional guns for new recruits and Parkersburg's cannons to be returned, with little result until mid-May. Although Capt. Henry Haywood of the 18th U.S. Infantry noted his availability, Pierpont sent those troops to protect Wheeling rather than Parkersburg on May 4, so on Frost sent his son, Sgt. Taylor Frost and four men as scouts to Harrisville, but they were captured on May 7.

A Union convention had been scheduled for Parkersburg on May 6, but it was delayed as boat crews feared crossing the 13 miles between Marietta, Ohio and Parkersburg. Rumors abounded that Col. Mudwall Jackson had a grudge list and would sack and burn Parkersburg, particularly as Gen. Roberts removed troops from Parkersburg to protect various railroad stations, even though raiders had already destroyed intervening rails so no attack by train could be expected. Gov. Pierpont asked for troops from Ohio, but only 400 men were sent on May 7, barely replacing the men sent to protect the B&O. However, the convention eventually was held after Col. Steedman conveyed delegates on the steamer Ohio No. 3 from Wheeling. On May 7 Gen. Kelley notified Pierpont that he was ordering the 14th Pennsylvania Cavalry and the 10th (West) Virginia Infantry to aid Parkersburg, and the upper Ohio Naval Command sent a second gunboat. Although Frost prepared evacuation plans, sympathizers' intelligence about the additional troops and gunboats reached the Confederates, and General Jones detoured to burn Rathbone's undefended oil field at Burning Springs rather than Parkersburg. Rathbone had tried to ransom the oil field, to no effect. On May 9, the burning oil boats and tanks exploded and burned (perhaps as much as 150,000 gallons of oil), and the river became a sheet of fire, somewhat obscured by clouds of black smoke though the red could be seen from the roof of Parkersburg's Swann hotel. Although Moccasin Rangers continued to create trouble, railroad crews fixed the tunnel at Cairo, the 11th West Virginia Infantry again protected the railroad by mid-month. Elections were held on May 28 as scheduled, although some Confederate sympathizers were confined beforehand and only 33 counties participated. In mid-June, construction of what was initially called Fort Logan (but Fort Boreman after the governor took office) was completed on the hill above Parkersburg to house the two returned brass cannon.

During 1863, despite his lack of formal legal training, Col. Frost also led courts martial in Clarksburg, West Virginia and Cumberland, Maryland. That summer, the 11th West Virginia participated in General Averill's and Union General David Hunter's raids into Virginia's Shenandoah Valley, including the burning of the Virginia Military Institute. Thus, the 9th West Virginia and 13th Kentucky militia (rather than the 11th West Virginia) defended Ravenswood during the victory at the Battle of Buffington Island which ended the raiding of CSA Major General John Hunt Morgan (although Morgan would surrender 8 days later after further defeat at the Battle of Salineville).

Col. Frost and his 11th West Virginia also fought raiders led by CSA Gen. Jubal Early in 1864, and Col. Frost received a citation for gallantry during the victory at the Battle of Cloyd's Mountain.

== Death and legacy ==
On July 18, 1864, Col. Frost was commanding the Third Brigade of Col. Joseph Thoburn's division when (due to poor intelligence) it encountered a large Confederate force near Snicker's Ferry, in what became known as the Battle of Cool Spring. Frost received a severe abdominal wound, and survived long enough to be taken to a nearby farmhouse, where he wrote out his last will and testament, though a nearby Confederate-sympathizing relative refused to come to his deathbed.

Large crowds attended Frost's funeral in Wheeling, West Virginia. Daniel Frost is buried at historic Mount Wood Cemetery above Wheeling. His youngest daughter did not survive to adulthood; his widow would live until 1886, marrying twice more, first in 1867 to Andrew Brown in Scioto County, Ohio, then in 1870 to John W. Brigham in Missouri, before moving to Cairo, Illinois (where their son Daniel V. Frost had settled) before her death. Meanwhile, although Frost's Unionist friend Andrew Flesher restarted a newspaper in Ravenswood (and sold it after about a year), Jackson County's next multi-year newspaper would be the Jackson Democrat, beginning in Ripley in 1864 (the year President Lincoln received 670 votes in the county, compared to 190 for McClellan) and replaced by the Jackson Herald in 1875. West Virginia has erected a highway marker memorializing Daniel Frost's contributions to the new state.
