= Beauchamp-Newman House =

Historic house in West Virginia, United States

- U.S. National Register of Historic Places
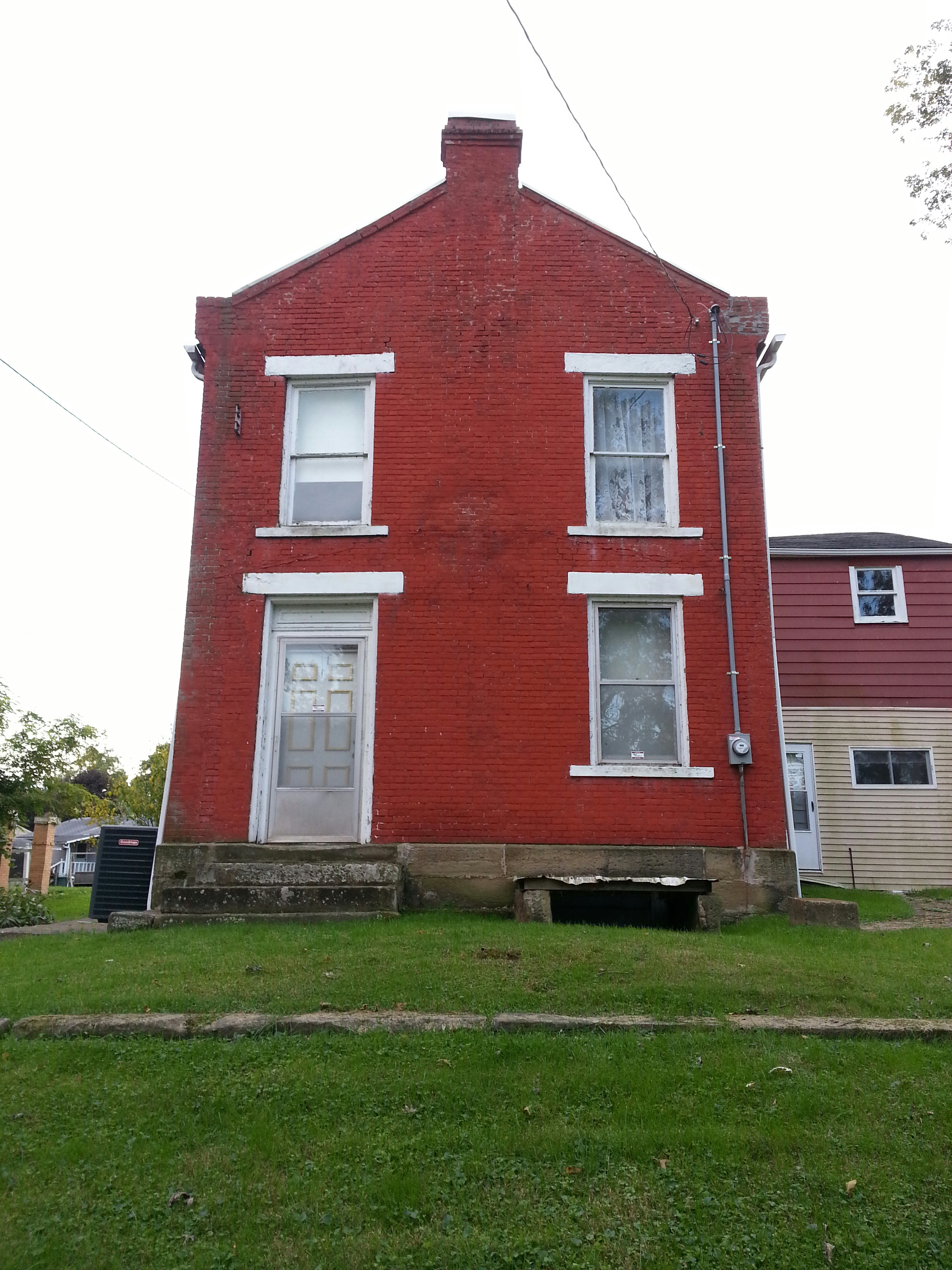

- Location within West Virginia Location within the United States
- Location: Court St., Elizabeth, West Virginia
- Coordinates: 39°3′51″N 81°23′37″W
- Area: 0.5 acres (0.20 ha)
- Built: 1848
- Architect: Beauchamp, Alfred
- NRHP reference No.: 74002021
- Added to NRHP: July 24, 1974

Beauchamp-Newman House, also known as the Alfred Beauchamp House and Beauchamp-Newman Museum, is a historic home located at Elizabeth, Wirt County, West Virginia. It was built in the 1830s, and is a two-story brick dwelling with hipped and gable roofs. The Beauchamp-Newman Museum, long known as the “Old Red Brick” is the oldest brick building in Elizabeth. It was built around 1835–40, by Alfred Beauchamp, grandson of the first settler in the community. It is believed that the bricks were made from local clay deposits on his land, probably by slaves. The building was placed on the National Register of Historic Places in 1974. On May 23, 1848, the first meeting of the newly formed Wirt County courts met in this home. The museum is owned and operated by the Elizabeth Beauchamp Chapter Daughters of American Pioneers.

It was listed on the National Register of Historic Places in 1974.
