= WXIL =

Radio station in Parkersburg, West Virginia

- Parkersburg, West Virginia; United States
- Broadcast area: Mid-Ohio Valley
- Frequency: 99.1 MHz
- Branding: WXIL 99

Programming
- Format: Classic hits
- Affiliations: Compass Media Networks; Westwood One

Ownership
- Owner: Seven Mountains Media; (Seven Mountains of DE, LLC)
- Sister stations: WGGE; WHBR-FM; WLYQ; WPKB; WRZZ

History
- First air date: November 28, 1975
- Former call signs: WCEF-FM (1965–1974); WIBZ (1974-1984); WMGP (1984-1990); WHCM (1990-1998); WXKX (1998-2001); WGGE (2001-2024)

Technical information
- Licensing authority: FCC
- Facility ID: 15254
- Class: B1
- ERP: 8,700 watts
- HAAT: 168 meters (551 ft)
- Transmitter coordinates: 39°17′29.40″N 81°39′19.30″W

Links
- Public license information: Public file; LMS
- Webcast: Listen live
- Website: wxilradio.com

WXIL (99.1 FM) is a classic hits formatted broadcast radio station licensed to Parkersburg, West Virginia, United States, serving the Mid-Ohio Valley. It is owned by Seven Mountains Media.

On June 26, 2024, WGGE changed their format from country (which moved to 95.1 FM in Elizabeth, West Virginia) to classic hits, branded as "WXIL 99" under new WXIL call letters.
