= WGGE =

Radio station in Elizabeth, West Virginia

- Elizabeth, West Virginia; United States
- Broadcast area: Parkersburg–Marietta
- Frequency: 95.1 MHz
- Branding: Froggy 95

Programming
- Format: Country
- Affiliations: Compass Media Networks

Ownership
- Owner: Seven Mountains Media; (Seven Mountains of DE, LLC)
- Sister stations: WHBR-FM; WLYQ; WPKB; WRZZ; WXIL

History
- First air date: November 28, 1975 (as WXIL)
- Former call signs: WXIL (1975–2024)
- Call sign meaning: Similar to "froggy"

Technical information
- Licensing authority: FCC
- Facility ID: 52015
- Class: B
- ERP: 50,000 watts
- HAAT: 152 meters (499 feet)
- Transmitter coordinates: 39°14′47″N 81°28′19″W

Links
- Public license information: Public file; LMS
- Webcast: Listen live
- Website: ilovefroggy.com

WGGE (95.1 FM, "Froggy 95") is a radio station broadcasting a country music format. Licensed to Elizabeth, West Virginia, United States, it serves the Parkersburg–Marietta area. The station is currently owned by Seven Mountains Media.

== History ==
Throughout much of the 1980s, WXIL had a Top 40 music format, but unlike most CHR stations at the time, WXIL's format focused more towards rock and rhythmic titles, and was also altered in surveys. On June 26, 2024, WXIL switched frequencies with WGGE, moving to 99.1. As a result, WXIL dropped its CHR format and flipped to a classic hits format.
