= Munday, West Virginia =

Munday
- Unincorporated community
- Location within the state of West Virginia Munday (the United States)
- Coordinates: 39°0′19″N 81°12′22″W
- Country: United States
- State: West Virginia
- County: Wirt
- Time zone: UTC-5 (Eastern (EST))
  - Summer (DST): UTC-4 (EDT)
- ZIP codes: 26152

Munday is an unincorporated community in eastern Wirt County, West Virginia, United States. It lies along local roads southeast of the town of Elizabeth, the county seat of Wirt County. Its elevation is 717 feet (217 m). Munday had a post office, which closed on October 26, 2002.

The community was named after the local Munday family.
