= Reedy Creek (West Virginia) =

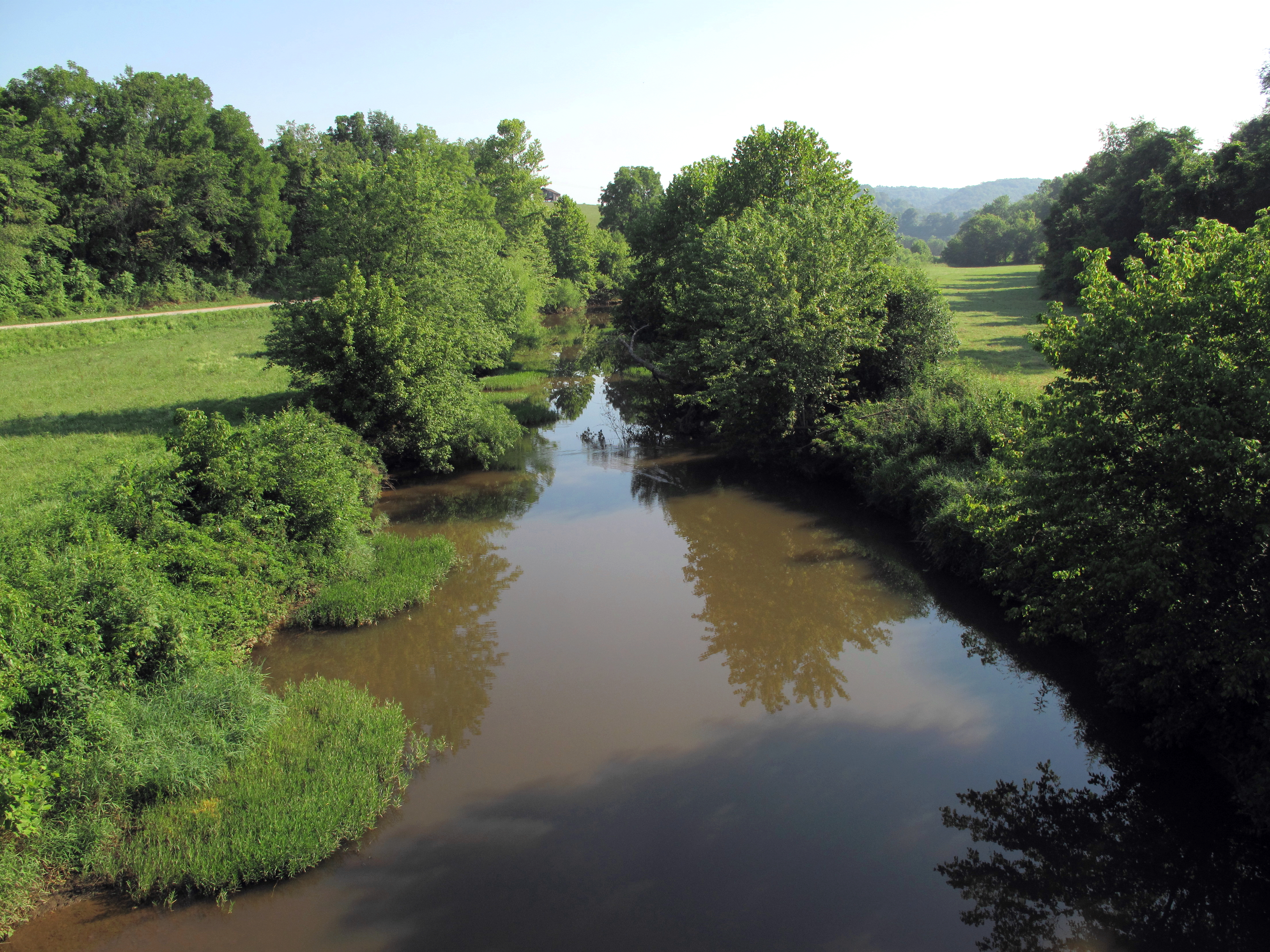
- Reedy Creek in Wirt County in 2010

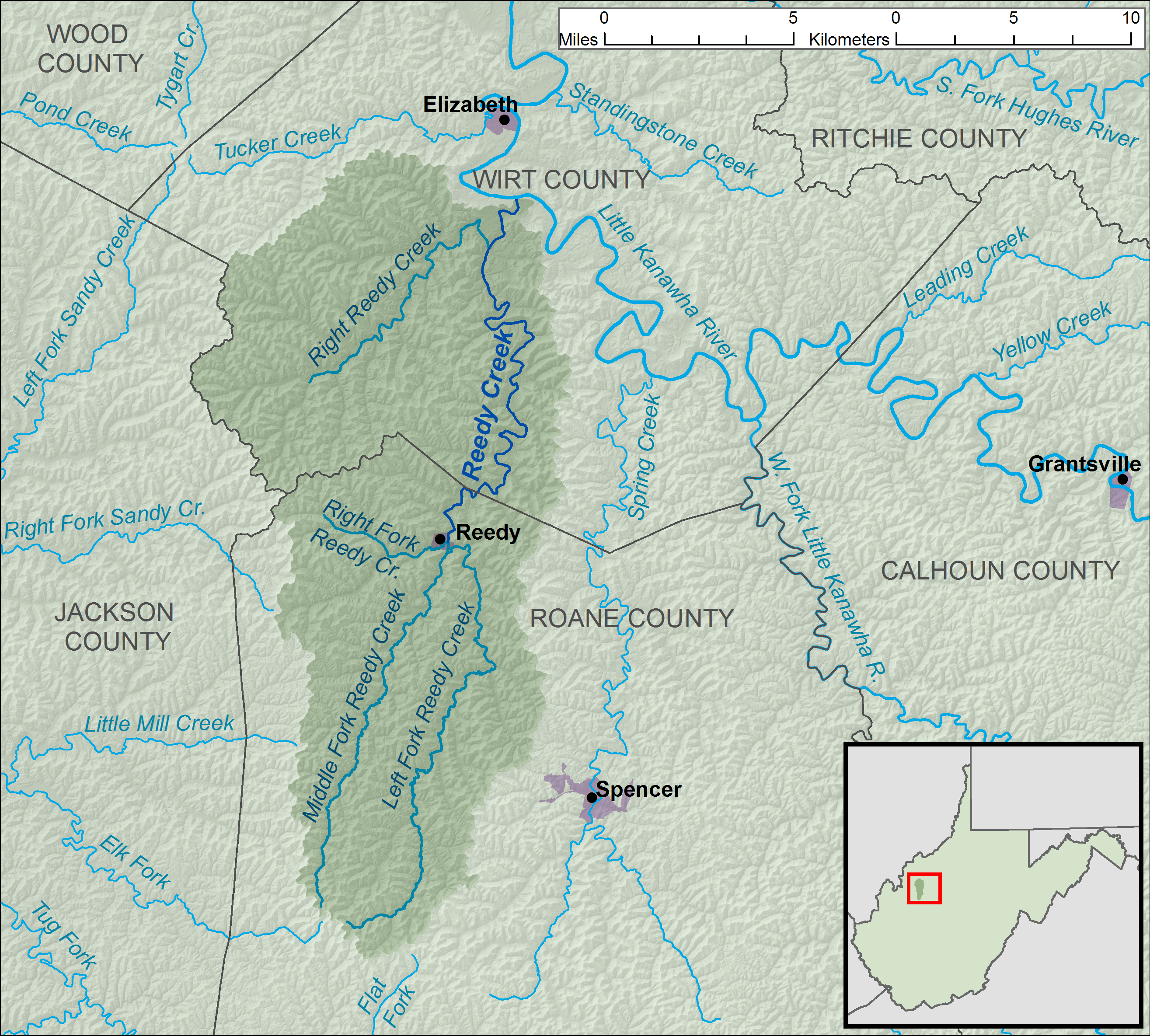
- Reedy Creek and its watershed

Location
- Country: United States
- State: West Virginia
- Counties: Roane, Wirt

Physical characteristics
- Source: Left Fork Reedy Creek
  - location: western Roane County
  - coordinates: 38.754811°N 81.4740114°W
  - length: 15.9 mi (25.6 km)
  - elevation: 1,014 ft (309 m)
- 2nd source: Right Fork Reedy Creek
  - location: northwestern Roane County
  - coordinates: 38.9117504°N 81.5084561°W
  - length: 4.7 mi (7.6 km)
  - elevation: 979 ft (298 m)
- Source confluence
  - location: Reedy, Roane County
  - coordinates: 38.8995287°N 81.4231765°W
  - elevation: 673 ft (205 m)
- Mouth: Little Kanawha River
  - location: Palestine, Wirt County
  - coordinates: 39.0314692°N 81.3903976°W
  - elevation: 607 ft (185 m)
- Length: 22.6 mi (36.4 km)
- Basin size: 133 sq mi (340 km^{2})

Basin features
- Tributaries
  - left: Middle Fork Reedy Creek, Right Reedy Creek

Reedy Creek is a tributary of the Little Kanawha River in western West Virginia in the United States. Via the Little Kanawha and Ohio rivers, it is part of the watershed of the Mississippi River, draining an area of 133 square miles (340 km^{2}) in a rural region on the unglaciated portion of the Allegheny Plateau. It is 22.6 miles (36.4 km) long, or 38.5 miles (62.0 km) long including its Left Fork.

Reedy Creek is formed in the town of Reedy in northern Roane County by the confluence of its Left Fork and its Right Fork:

- The Left Fork Reedy Creek, 15.9 miles (25.6 km) long, rises in western Roane County, approximately 7 miles (11 km) southwest of Spencer, and flows generally northward, through the community of Billings.
- The Right Fork Reedy Creek, 4.7 miles (7.6 km) long, rises in northwestern Roane County and flows generally westward.

From the town of Reedy, the main stem of Reedy Creek flows generally northward into Wirt County, through the community of Lucille; it flows into the Little Kanawha River from the south in the community of Palestine. It is paralleled for most of its length by West Virginia Route 14.

Among Reedy Creek's tributaries are two others with names derived from that of the main stream:

- The Middle Fork Reedy Creek, 12.4 miles (20.0 km) long, is a tributary of the Left Fork. It rises in western Roane County and flows generally north-northeastward, through the community of Peniel, to the town of Reedy, where it flows into the Left Fork approximately 0.3 miles (0.48 km) upstream of the latter's confluence with the Right Fork.
- Right Reedy Creek, 8.3 miles (13.4 km) long, is formed at the community of Peewee in southwestern Wirt County by the confluence of Enoch Fork, 3 miles (4.8 km) long, and Fulls Fork, 3.4 miles (5.5 km) long. Right Reedy Creek flows northeastward and flows into Reedy Creek from the east, 2 miles (3.2 km) upstream of Reedy Creek's confluence with the Little Kanawha River.

According to the West Virginia Department of Environmental Protection, approximately 79% of the Reedy Creek watershed is forested, mostly deciduous. Approximately 20% is used for pasture and agriculture.

== See also ==
- List of rivers of West Virginia
