= Lucile, West Virginia =

- Unincorporated community
- Location within West Virginia Location within the United States
- Coordinates: 38°56′43″N 81°23′09″W
- Country: United States
- State: West Virginia
- County: Wirt
- Elevation: 666 ft (203 m)
- Time zone: UTC-5 (Eastern (EST))
  - Summer (DST): UTC-4 (EDT)
- Area codes: 304 & 681
- GNIS feature ID: 1555009

Lucile (also known as Lucille) is an unincorporated community in Wirt County, West Virginia, United States. Lucile is located on West Virginia Route 14 and Reedy Creek, 4 miles (6.4 km) northeast of Reedy.
