= Peewee, West Virginia =

Peewee
- Unincorporated community
- Location within the state of West Virginia Peewee (the United States)
- Coordinates: 38°57′45″N 81°29′29″W
- Country: United States
- State: West Virginia
- County: Wirt
- Time zone: UTC-5 (Eastern (EST))
  - Summer (DST): UTC-4 (EDT)
- GNIS feature ID: 1549870

Peewee (also Pee Wee) is an unincorporated community in southwestern Wirt County, West Virginia, United States. It lies along local roads southwest of the town of Elizabeth, the county seat of Wirt County. Its elevation is 679 feet (207 m). Right Reedy Creek is formed at Peewee by the confluence of Enoch Fork and Fulls Fork.
