= Kanawha Hotel =

- U.S. National Register of Historic Places
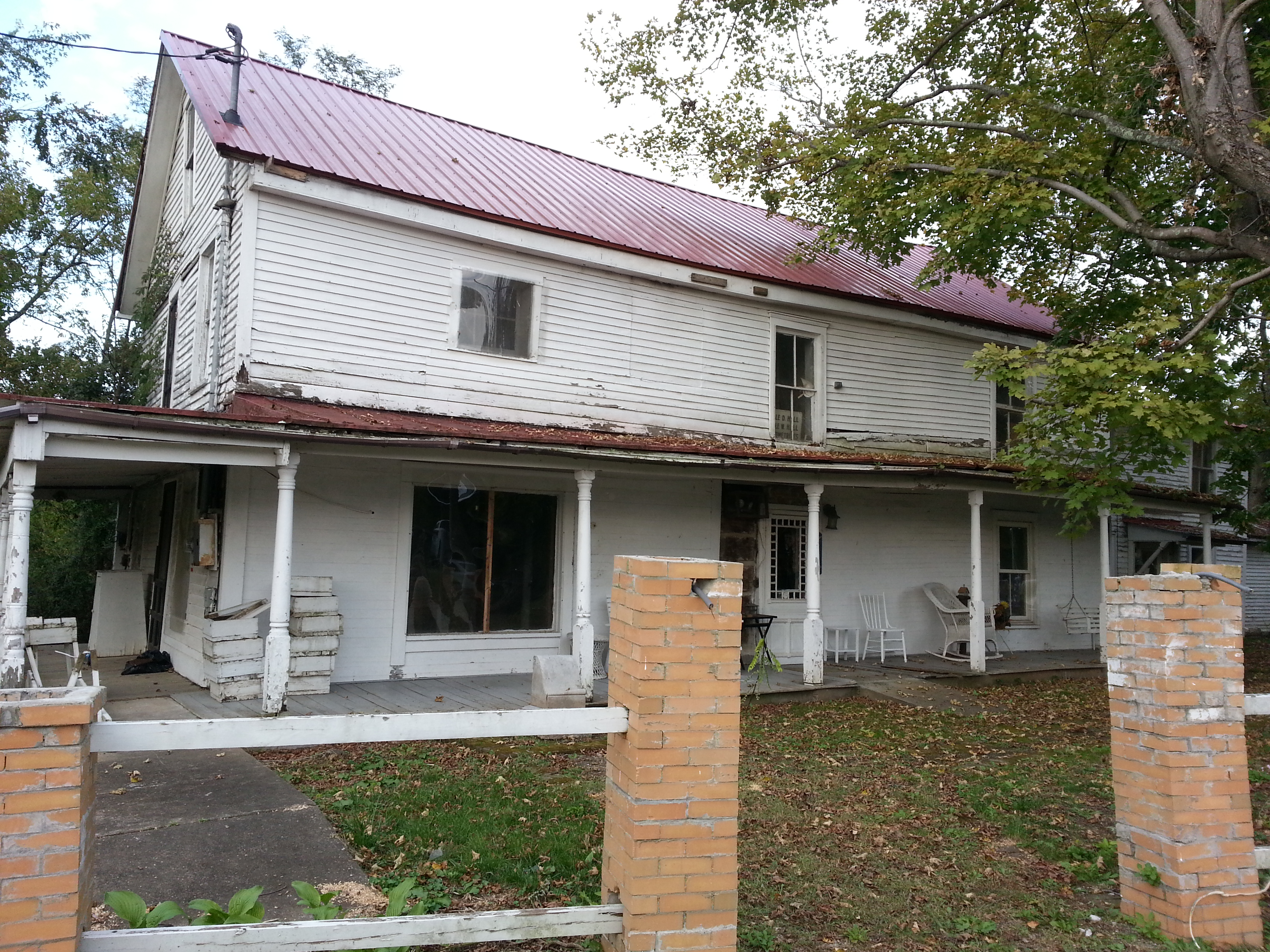
- Kanawha Hotel, September 2012

- Location within West Virginia Location within the United States
- Location: 111 Court St., Elizabeth, West Virginia
- Coordinates: 39°3′51″N 81°23′36″W
- Area: 1.2 acres (0.49 ha)
- Built: 1800
- Architect: Beauchamp, Manlove
- NRHP reference No.: 86003232
- Added to NRHP: November 25, 1986

Kanawha Hotel is a historic hotel located at Elizabeth, Wirt County, West Virginia. It is a two-story, log core, clapboard covered building which gained its present appearance about 1870 with several frame additions. The original section was built about 1800, and is possibly the oldest building in the county. The hotel operated from 1812 to 1928, after which it was sold as a private residence. Also on the property is a 19th-century well pavilion with a pyramidal roof.

It was listed on the National Register of Historic Places in 1986.
