= Buffalo Church =

Historic church in West Virginia, United States

- U.S. National Register of Historic Places
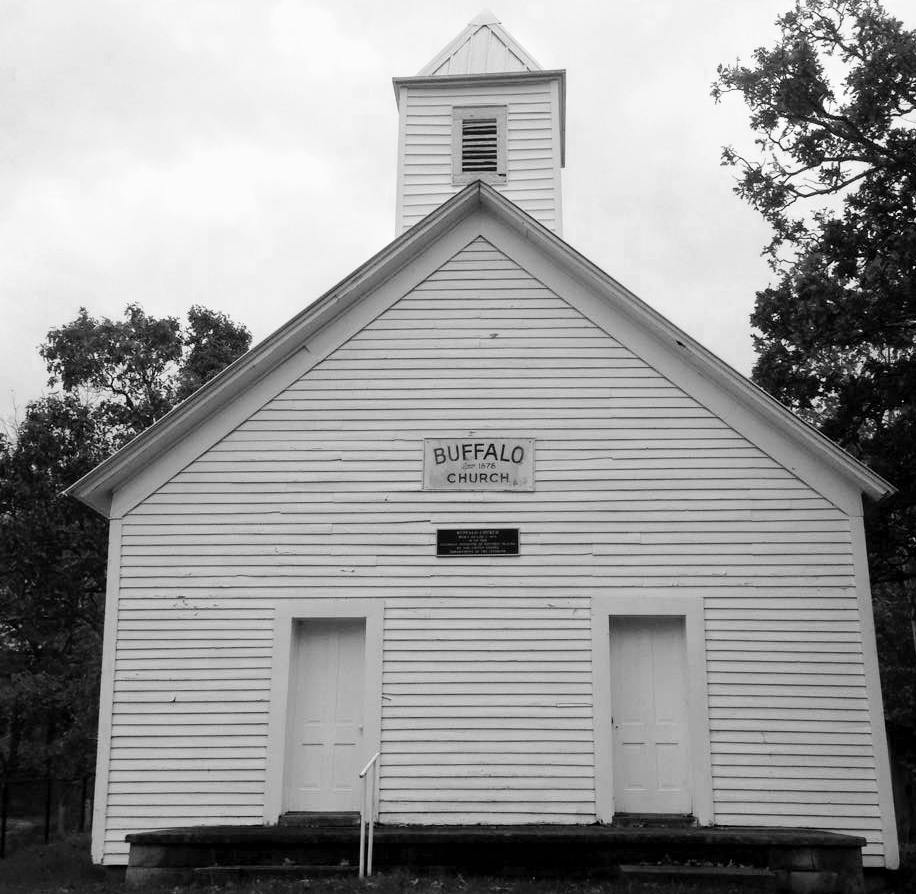

- Location within West Virginia Location within the United States
- Nearest city: Palestine, West Virginia
- Coordinates: 38°57′57″N 81°25′16″W
- Area: 0.5 acres (0.20 ha)
- Built: 1884
- Architect: McCoy, Andrew; McClung, Matthew
- Architectural style: Log architecture
- NRHP reference No.: 89001781
- Added to NRHP: January 29, 1990

Buffalo Church is a historic Methodist church located near Palestine, Wirt County, West Virginia, United States. It was built between 1884 and 1886, and is a one-story, oblong log structure with exterior weatherboarding of beech wood and interior finish of wood boards on walls and ceiling. It is painted white on the inside and outside. Also on the property is the church cemetery, and three outbuildings: two pit toilets and a storage building that were constructed by workers associated with the Work Projects Administration.

It was listed on the National Register of Historic Places in 1990.
