= WLYQ =

Radio station in Parkersburg, West Virginia

- Parkersburg, West Virginia; United States
- Broadcast area: Mid-Ohio Valley
- Frequency: 1050 kHz
- Branding: Willie 94.7

Programming
- Format: Classic country
- Affiliations: Compass Media Networks; Mountaineer Sports Network from IMG

Ownership
- Owner: Seven Mountains Media; (Seven Mountains of DE, LLC)
- Sister stations: WGGE; WHBR-FM; WPKB; WRZZ; WXIL

History
- First air date: April 9, 1954 (as WCEF)
- Former call signs: WCEF (1954–1974); WADC (1974–2018)

Technical information
- Licensing authority: FCC
- Facility ID: 15255
- Class: D
- Power: 5,000 watts day 144 watts night
- Transmitter coordinates: 39°15′29.0″N 81°33′49.0″W
- Translator: 94.7 W234DC (Parkersburg)

Links
- Public license information: Public file; LMS
- Webcast: Listen live
- Website: itswillieradio.com

WLYQ (1050 AM) is a classic country formatted broadcast radio station licensed to Parkersburg, West Virginia, United States, serving the Mid-Ohio Valley and owned by Seven Mountains Media.

== History ==
Logo before eliminating the AM from its branding

On February 1, 2018, WADC changed their format from adult standards to classic country, branded as "Willie 1050" under new WLYQ calls.
