= Morristown, West Virginia =

Morristown
- Unincorporated community
- Location within the state of West Virginia Morristown (the United States)
- Coordinates: 39°2′49″N 81°29′33″W
- Country: United States
- State: West Virginia
- County: Wirt
- Elevation: 679 ft (207 m)
- Time zone: UTC-5 (Eastern (EST))
  - Summer (DST): UTC-4 (EDT)
- GNIS ID: 1549833

Morristown is an unincorporated community in Wirt County, West Virginia, United States.
