= Linn, West Virginia =

- Unincorporated community
- Location within West Virginia Location within the United States
- Coordinates: 39°00′29″N 80°43′08″W
- Country: United States
- State: West Virginia
- County: Gilmer
- Elevation: 804 ft (245 m)
- Time zone: UTC-5 (Eastern (EST))
  - Summer (DST): UTC-4 (EDT)
- ZIP code: 26384
- Area codes: 304 & 681
- GNIS feature ID: 1549787

Linn is an unincorporated community in Gilmer County, West Virginia, United States. Linn is located at the junction of U.S. routes 33 and 119, and West Virginia Route 47, along Leading Creek, 8 miles (13 km) northeast of Glenville. Linn has a post office with ZIP code 26384.

The community was named after Robert George Linn, an early settler.
