= Burning Springs Complex =

- U.S. National Register of Historic Places
- U.S. Historic district
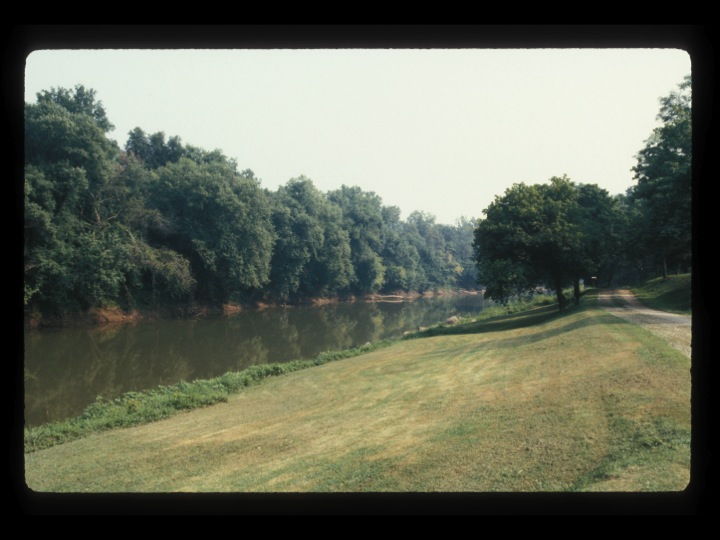

- Location within West Virginia Location within the United States
- Location: Along the N bank of the Kanawha River from the confluence of Burning Springs Run, Burning Springs, West Virginia
- Coordinates: 38°59′16″N 81°19′10″W
- Area: 20 acres (8.1 ha)
- Built: 1859
- Architect: Rathbone Bros.; Et al.
- NRHP reference No.: 71000884
- Added to NRHP: May 6, 1971

Burning Springs Complex, also known as the Rathbone and Karns Wells, is a national historic district located at Burning Springs, Wirt County, West Virginia. It encompasses one contributing building and three contributing sites. It was historically viewed as the world's second great oil field, after the Drake Well in Pennsylvania. However, more recent scholarship including the PBS documentary Burning Springs shows it predates the Drake Well by a number of years. During the American Civil War, it was destroyed by General William E. Jones on May 9, 1863.

It was listed on the National Register of Historic Places in 1971.
