= Brohard, West Virginia =

Unincorporated community in West Virginia, United States

Brohard
- Unincorporated community
- Location within the state of West Virginia Brohard (the United States)
- Coordinates: 39°2′11″N 81°10′34″W
- Country: United States
- State: West Virginia
- County: Ritchie and Wirt
- Elevation: 965 ft (294 m)
- Time zone: UTC-5 (Eastern (EST))
  - Summer (DST): UTC-4 (EDT)
- ZIP codes: 26138
- GNIS feature ID: 1536384

Brohard (also Hartley or Hartley Brohard) is an unincorporated community in Ritchie and Wirt counties in the U.S. state of West Virginia. Its elevation is 965 feet (294 m). Brohard had a post office, which closed on November 2, 2002.

M. M. Brohard, a local merchant, gave the community his name.
