= Burning Springs, West Virginia =

Unincorporated community in West Virginia, United States

Burning Springs
- Unincorporated community
- Location within the state of West Virginia Burning Springs (the United States)
- Coordinates: 38°58′52″N 81°18′50″W
- Country: United States
- State: West Virginia
- County: Wirt
- Elevation: 643 ft (196 m)
- Time zone: UTC-5 (Eastern (EST))
  - Summer (DST): UTC-4 (EDT)
- ZIP codes: 26139
- GNIS feature ID: 1549617

Burning Springs is an unincorporated community in Wirt County, West Virginia, United States. It takes its name from the natural gas which bubbled up through the spring and would burn when lit.

== History ==
In the early 19th century, wells were drilled at the springs to produce brine which was evaporated to produce salt. Some petroleum was produced along with the salt brine. By 1836, the salt wells were producing 50 to 100 barrels per year of oil that was sold as illuminating oil. The wells at Burning Springs produced and sold petroleum many years before the Drake Oil Well at Titusville, Pennsylvania.

John V. Rathbone bought 100 acres in 1842 and a decade later drilled a new well, only to discover it produced more oil than salt. However, by 1859 it was producing seven 40-gallon barrels of oil per day, more effectively than gathering oil from the nearby river. The first well at Burning Springs drilled to obtain oil rather than salt was begun in 1859, and soon the Rathbone family (John V. and his son John C. ("Cass") Rathbone), sold 70 one-acre plots to others who wished to drill. In 1861, 10,000 people moved to the area, and the boom town grew to more than a mile long. Burning Springs was then larger than Elizabeth, the Wirt County seat, as well as Parkersburg, where the barrels transported down the Little Kanawha River were transferred to larger boats on the Ohio River or to railroad cars.

As the Civil War had begun, Col. Cass Rathbone recruited a militia company which became the 11th West Virginia Infantry, with his brother in law Daniel E. Frost as Lt. Col. However, on September 2, 1862, Col. Rathbone surrendered with approximately 200 troops to Confederate raiders in Spencer (the Roane County seat), which some believed partial payment for protection from Confederate raids on the oil field. The raiders had immediately paroled Rathbone and his men, but Rathbone was transferred to Pennsylvania, then President Lincoln dismissed him from the army in January 1863. On May 9, 1863 during the Jones-Imboden Raid partially to prevent West Virginia's statehood, Confederate raiders set every oil well afire, as well as 120,000 gallons ready for shipping, destroying the town and causing the river (and its forested banks) to burn for miles. The Rathbones and others managed to rebuild somewhat, but in 1865 following the patriarch's death and several others during the war, the remaining Rathbones sold their interest for $400,000 and moved west. Others thus drilled hundreds of wells in the following decades. Although the town is now small, some oil production continues to this day.

The Burning Springs Complex was listed on the National Register of Historic Places in 1971, although not many original buildings remain (fire being a constant danger for the wood structures). The Ruble Church was listed on the National Register of Historic Places in 1982. In addition to a historical marker remembering the Rathbones, a park and museum were opened in 2002.
