= Ivan, West Virginia =

Ivan
- Unincorporated community
- Location within the state of West Virginia Ivan (the United States)
- Coordinates: 38°59′3″N 81°20′33″W
- Country: United States
- State: West Virginia
- County: Wirt
- Elevation: 627 ft (191 m)
- Time zone: UTC-5 (Eastern (EST))
  - Summer (DST): UTC-4 (EDT)
- GNIS ID: 1678826

Ivan is an unincorporated community in Wirt County, West Virginia, United States.

The community was named after Ivan Owens, the son of an early postmaster.
