= WHBR-FM =

Radio station in Parkersburg, West Virginia

- Parkersburg, West Virginia; United States
- Broadcast area: Mid-Ohio Valley
- Frequency: 103.1 MHz
- Branding: 103.1 The Bear

Programming
- Format: Active rock
- Affiliations: Compass Media Networks; Mountaineer Sports Network

Ownership
- Owner: Seven Mountains Media; (Seven Mountains of DE, LLC)
- Sister stations: WGGE; WLYQ; WPKB; WRZZ; WXIL

History
- First air date: 1966
- Former call signs: WTAP-FM (1966–1972); WKYG-FM (1972–1977); WQAW (1977–1985); WXKX (1985–1998)
- Call sign meaning: "Bear"

Technical information
- Licensing authority: FCC
- Facility ID: 22677
- Class: A
- ERP: 2,100 watts
- HAAT: 171 meters (561 ft)
- Transmitter coordinates: 39°14′46.3″N 81°28′18.4″W

Links
- Public license information: Public file; LMS
- Webcast: Listen live
- Website: bearradiorocks.com

WHBR-FM (103.1 MHz, "The Bear") is an active rock formatted broadcast radio station licensed to Parkersburg, West Virginia, United States, serving the Mid-Ohio Valley. It is owned by Seven Mountains Media.
