= Greencastle, West Virginia =

Greencastle
- Unincorporated community
- Location within the state of West Virginia Greencastle (the United States)
- Coordinates: 39°7′52″N 81°22′45″W
- Country: United States
- State: West Virginia
- County: Wirt
- Time zone: UTC-5 (Eastern (EST))
  - Summer (DST): UTC-4 (EDT)

Greencastle — also Green Castle, Greene Ford, or Greenville — is an unincorporated community in Wirt County, West Virginia, United States. Its elevation is 627 feet (191 m).

Greencastle was originally called Greenville, derived from the name of Marrah Green, an "old slave" of Thomas Pribble, the first settler. The name was later changed by postal authorities to Greencastle in order to avoid confusion with another Greenville in the state.
