= Windy, West Virginia =

Windy
- Unincorporated community
- Location within the state of West Virginia Windy (the United States)
- Coordinates: 39°1′41″N 81°31′41″W
- Country: United States
- State: West Virginia
- County: Wirt
- Elevation: 1,099 ft (335 m)
- Time zone: UTC-5 (Eastern (EST))
  - Summer (DST): UTC-4 (EDT)
- Area code: 304
- GNIS feature ID: 1556005

Windy is an unincorporated community in Wirt County, West Virginia, United States.

The community most likely was so named on account of frequent windy conditions at the town site.
