= 1992 United States presidential election in West Virginia =

- November 3, 1992
- Turnout: 71.50% (of registered voters) ▲50.64% (of voting age population) ▲

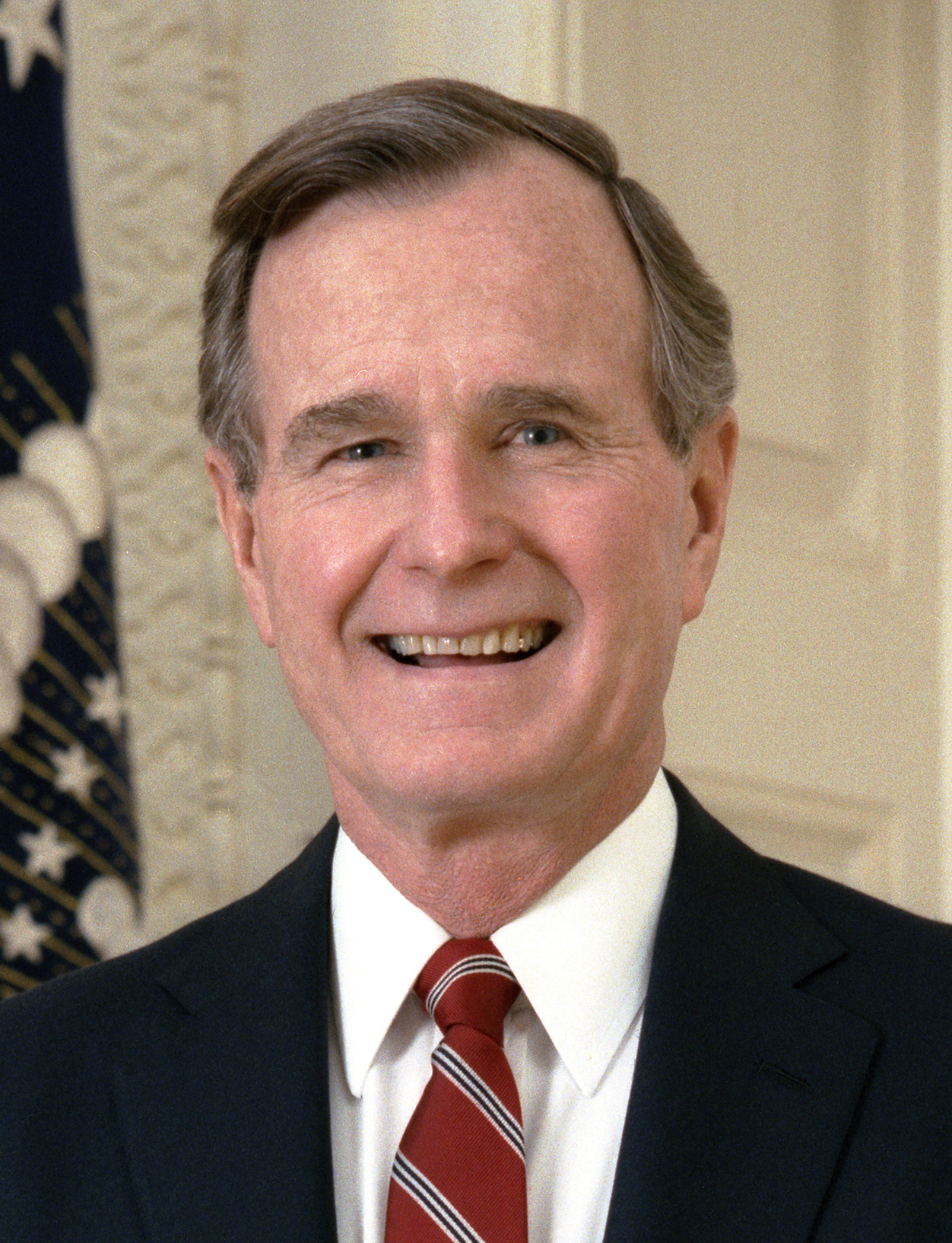

Nominee	Bill Clinton	George H. W. Bush	Ross Perot
Party	Democratic	Republican	Independent
Home state	Arkansas	Texas	Texas
Running mate	Al Gore	Dan Quayle	James Stockdale
Electoral vote	5	0	0
Popular vote	331,001	241,974	108,829
Percentage	48.41%	35.39%	15.92%

Clinton
40–50%
50–60%
60–70%
70–80%
Bush
30–40%
40–50%
50–60%
60–70%
President before election
George H. W. Bush
Republican
Elected President
Bill Clinton
Democratic

The 1992 United States presidential election in West Virginia took place on November 3, 1992, as part of the 1992 United States presidential election. Voters chose five representatives, or electors to the Electoral College, who voted for president and vice president.

West Virginia was won by Governor Bill Clinton (D-Arkansas) with 48.41% of the popular vote over incumbent President George H. W. Bush (R-Texas) with 35.39%. Businessman Ross Perot (I-Texas) finished in third, with 15.92% of the popular vote. Clinton ultimately won the national vote, defeating incumbent President Bush.

As of the 2024 presidential election, this is the last election in which Wirt County voted for a Democratic presidential candidate.

== Results ==
1992 United States presidential election in West Virginia
Party	Candidate	Votes	Percentage	Electoral votes
Democratic	Bill Clinton	331,001	48.41%	5
Republican	George H. W. Bush (incumbent)	241,974	35.39%	0
Independent	Ross Perot	108,829	15.92%	0
Libertarian	Andre Marrou	1,873	0.27%	0
Totals		683,677	100.00%	5

=== By congressional district ===
District	Clinton	Bush	Perot	Representative
1st	46%	35%	19%	Alan Mollohan
2nd	45%	39%	16%	Bob Wise
3rd	55%	32%	13%	Nick Rahall

=== Results by county ===
Clinton won 42 of West Virginia's 55 counties.

County	Bill Clinton Democratic		George H. W. Bush Republican		Ross Perot Independent		Andre Marrou Libertarian		Margin		Total votes cast
County	#	%	#	%	#	%	#	%	#	%	Total votes cast
Barbour	3,467	49.86%	2,322	33.39%	1,153	16.58%	12	0.17%	1,145	16.47%	6,954
Berkeley	7,159	35.74%	9,134	45.60%	3,645	18.20%	91	0.45%	-1,975	-9.86%	20,029
Boone	6,576	68.09%	2,021	20.93%	1,037	10.74%	24	0.25%	4,555	47.16%	9,658
Braxton	3,396	58.91%	1,535	26.63%	823	14.28%	11	0.19%	1,861	32.28%	5,765
Brooke	5,693	54.66%	2,582	24.79%	2,103	20.19%	37	0.36%	3,111	29.87%	10,415
Cabell	15,111	44.82%	13,203	39.16%	5,311	15.75%	90	0.27%	1,908	5.66%	33,715
Calhoun	1,627	49.79%	1,095	33.51%	537	16.43%	9	0.28%	532	16.28%	3,268
Clay	1,928	52.72%	1,255	34.32%	462	12.63%	12	0.33%	673	18.40%	3,657
Doddridge	968	32.35%	1,500	50.13%	515	17.21%	9	0.30%	-532	-17.78%	2,992
Fayette	9,574	61.34%	3,991	25.57%	2,002	12.83%	41	0.26%	5,583	35.77%	15,608
Gilmer	1,576	49.97%	1,085	34.40%	484	15.35%	9	0.29%	491	15.57%	3,154
Grant	1,011	23.52%	2,762	64.26%	519	12.08%	6	0.14%	-1,751	-40.74%	4,298
Greenbrier	5,784	47.46%	4,442	36.45%	1,898	15.57%	63	0.52%	1,342	11.01%	12,187
Hampshire	2,365	38.32%	2,767	44.84%	1,022	16.56%	17	0.28%	-402	-6.52%	6,171
Hancock	7,830	52.08%	3,897	25.92%	3,267	21.73%	42	0.28%	3,933	26.16%	15,036
Hardy	1,917	41.04%	2,144	45.90%	602	12.89%	8	0.17%	-227	-4.86%	4,671
Harrison	15,480	51.02%	9,687	31.93%	5,131	16.91%	43	0.14%	5,793	19.09%	30,341
Jackson	5,102	45.44%	4,192	37.33%	1,908	16.99%	27	0.24%	910	8.11%	11,229
Jefferson	5,363	44.01%	4,656	38.21%	2,114	17.35%	52	0.43%	707	5.80%	12,185
Kanawha	38,315	46.91%	31,358	38.40%	11,778	14.42%	220	0.27%	6,957	8.51%	81,671
Lewis	2,931	44.66%	2,413	36.77%	1,197	18.24%	22	0.34%	518	7.89%	6,563
Lincoln	4,502	56.39%	2,637	33.03%	787	9.86%	58	0.73%	1,865	23.36%	7,984
Logan	11,095	68.08%	3,336	20.47%	1,835	11.26%	31	0.19%	7,759	47.61%	16,297
Marion	14,042	55.74%	6,380	25.32%	4,736	18.80%	36	0.14%	7,662	30.42%	25,194
Marshall	7,298	47.95%	4,463	29.33%	3,402	22.35%	56	0.37%	2,835	18.62%	15,219
Mason	5,331	47.60%	3,808	34.00%	2,045	18.26%	16	0.14%	1,523	13.60%	11,200
McDowell	7,019	71.76%	1,941	19.84%	803	8.21%	18	0.18%	5,078	51.92%	9,781
Mercer	9,511	46.91%	7,888	38.91%	2,817	13.89%	59	0.29%	1,623	8.00%	20,275
Mineral	3,992	37.21%	4,837	45.09%	1,884	17.56%	15	0.14%	-845	-7.88%	10,728
Mingo	7,342	67.53%	2,584	23.77%	915	8.42%	32	0.29%	4,758	43.76%	10,873
Monongalia	14,142	49.41%	9,831	34.35%	4,576	15.99%	74	0.26%	4,311	15.06%	28,623
Monroe	2,418	44.61%	2,311	42.64%	685	12.64%	6	0.11%	107	1.97%	5,420
Morgan	1,854	34.69%	2,585	48.37%	886	16.58%	19	0.36%	-731	-13.68%	5,344
Nicholas	5,042	52.91%	2,959	31.05%	1,495	15.69%	33	0.35%	2,083	21.86%	9,529
Ohio	9,522	46.15%	7,421	35.97%	3,632	17.60%	58	0.28%	2,101	10.18%	20,633
Pendleton	1,626	45.38%	1,589	44.35%	362	10.10%	6	0.17%	37	1.03%	3,583
Pleasants	1,387	41.08%	1,248	36.97%	731	21.65%	10	0.30%	139	4.11%	3,376
Pocahontas	1,741	46.05%	1,401	37.05%	627	16.58%	12	0.32%	340	9.00%	3,781
Preston	3,933	37.47%	4,429	42.20%	2,109	20.10%	24	0.23%	-496	-4.73%	10,495
Putnam	6,817	39.12%	7,653	43.91%	2,910	16.70%	48	0.28%	-836	-4.79%	17,428
Raleigh	13,171	52.24%	8,700	34.50%	3,247	12.88%	96	0.38%	4,471	17.74%	25,214
Randolph	5,097	49.86%	3,496	34.20%	1,582	15.48%	47	0.46%	1,601	15.66%	10,222
Ritchie	1,474	33.38%	2,184	49.46%	745	16.87%	13	0.29%	-710	-16.08%	4,416
Roane	2,607	44.51%	2,207	37.68%	1,009	17.23%	34	0.58%	400	6.83%	5,857
Summers	2,650	54.28%	1,652	33.84%	565	11.57%	15	0.31%	998	20.44%	4,882
Taylor	2,843	46.49%	2,022	33.07%	1,242	20.31%	8	0.13%	821	13.42%	6,115
Tucker	1,805	49.79%	1,261	34.79%	550	15.17%	9	0.25%	544	15.00%	3,625
Tyler	1,587	37.76%	1,593	37.90%	1,013	24.10%	10	0.24%	-6	-0.14%	4,203
Upshur	3,161	38.30%	3,505	42.47%	1,558	18.88%	29	0.35%	-344	-4.17%	8,253
Wayne	8,392	51.35%	5,729	35.05%	2,199	13.45%	24	0.15%	2,663	16.30%	16,344
Webster	2,320	64.88%	811	22.68%	436	12.19%	9	0.25%	1,509	42.20%	3,576
Wetzel	3,753	49.40%	2,271	29.89%	1,550	20.40%	23	0.30%	1,482	19.51%	7,597
Wirt	1,043	43.79%	939	39.42%	394	16.54%	6	0.25%	104	4.37%	2,382
Wood	13,529	37.52%	15,441	42.83%	6,998	19.41%	86	0.24%	-1,912	-5.31%	36,054
Wyoming	5,782	60.19%	2,821	29.36%	996	10.37%	8	0.08%	2,961	30.83%	9,607
Totals	331,001	48.41%	241,974	35.39%	108,829	15.92%	1,873	0.27%	89,027	13.02%	683,711

==== Counties that flipped from Republican to Democratic ====
- Cabell
- Jackson
- Jefferson
- Lewis
- Mercer
- Monroe
- Ohio
- Pendleton
- Pleasants
- Roane
- Wirt
