= Peniel, West Virginia =

- Unincorporated community
- Location within West Virginia Location within the United States
- Coordinates: 38°49′38″N 81°28′03″W
- Country: United States
- State: West Virginia
- County: Roane
- Elevation: 725 ft (221 m)
- Time zone: UTC-5 (Eastern (EST))
  - Summer (DST): UTC-4 (EDT)
- Area codes: 304 & 681
- GNIS feature ID: 1549871

Peniel is an unincorporated community in Roane County, West Virginia, United States. Peniel is located along the Middle Fork Reedy Creek on U.S. Route 33, 6.5 miles (10.5 km) west-northwest of Spencer.
