= WRZZ =

Radio station in Parkersburg, West Virginia

- Parkersburg, West Virginia; United States
- Broadcast area: Parkersburg–Marietta
- Frequency: 106.1 MHz
- Branding: 106.1 The Goat

Programming
- Format: Classic rock

Ownership
- Owner: Seven Mountains Media; (Seven Mountains of DE, LLC)
- Sister stations: WGGE; WHBR-FM; WLYQ; WPKB; WXIL

History
- First air date: 1989

Technical information
- Licensing authority: FCC
- Facility ID: 41082
- Class: A
- ERP: 3,300 watts
- HAAT: 138 meters
- Transmitter coordinates: 39°14′47.0″N 81°28′19.0″W

Links
- Public license information: Public file; LMS
- Webcast: Listen live
- Website: mygoatrocks.com

WRZZ (106.1 FM) is a classic rock formatted broadcast radio station licensed to Parkersburg, West Virginia, United States, serving the Parkersburg–Marietta area. It is owned by Seven Mountains Media. The station is an affiliate of the syndicated Pink Floyd program "Floydian Slip".

On June 26, 2024, WRZZ rebranded as "106.1 The Goat".
