= Hilbert, West Virginia =

Hilbert
- Unincorporated community
- Location within the state of West Virginia Hilbert (the United States)
- Coordinates: 38°55′20″N 81°22′1″W
- Country: United States
- State: West Virginia
- County: Wirt
- Elevation: 1,004 ft (306 m)
- Time zone: UTC-5 (Eastern (EST))
  - Summer (DST): UTC-4 (EDT)
- GNIS ID: 1678822

Hilbert is an unincorporated community in Wirt County, West Virginia, United States.
