= Zackville, West Virginia =

Zackville
- Unincorporated community
- Location within the state of West Virginia Zackville (the United States)
- Coordinates: 38°58′27″N 81°28′12″W
- Country: United States
- State: West Virginia
- County: Wirt
- Elevation: 673 ft (205 m)
- Time zone: UTC-5 (Eastern (EST))
  - Summer (DST): UTC-4 (EDT)
- GNIS ID: 1549999

Zackville is an unincorporated community in Wirt County, West Virginia, United States.
