= WPKB =

Radio station in Parkersburg, West Virginia

- Parkersburg, West Virginia; United States
- Broadcast area: Parkersburg–Vienna metropolitan area
- Frequency: 1230 kHz
- Branding: Pop! Radio 103.5

Programming
- Language: English
- Format: Contemporary hit radio
- Affiliations: Compass Media Networks

Ownership
- Owner: Seven Mountains Media; (Seven Mountains of DE, LLC)
- Sister stations: WGGE; WHBR-FM; WLYQ; WRZZ; WXIL

History
- First air date: September 1947
- Former call signs: WCOM (1947–1959); WTAP (1959–1972); WKYG (1972–2004); WVNT (2004–2024)
- Call sign meaning: "Parkersburg"

Technical information
- Licensing authority: FCC
- Facility ID: 22678
- Class: C
- Power: 880 watts
- Transmitter coordinates: 39°15′29.3″N 81°33′48.4″W
- Translator: 103.5 W278CQ (Parkersburg)

Links
- Public license information: Public file; LMS
- Webcast: Listen live
- Website: popradio1035.com

WPKB (1230 kHz) is a commercial AM radio station licensed to Parkersburg, West Virginia, United States, serving the Parkersburg–Vienna metropolitan area. The station is owned by Seven Mountains Media and broadcasts a contemporary hit radio format.

== History ==
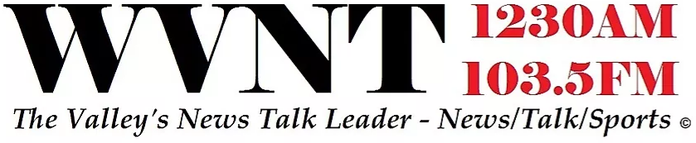
Logo under conservative talk format, used until 2024.

From April 13, 1998, until March 2004, WKYG aired Radio Disney, a format targeted towards tweens and young teens.

On June 25, 2024, WVNT dropped its previous conservative talk radio format and began stunting with a loop of "Pop" by NSYNC; this led into a flip back to contemporary hit radio as "Pop! Radio" on June 28 at 10 am. This was predicated by Seven Mountains Media applying for new callsign WPKB for the station, as well as the company using the same stunt for "Pop! Radio" launches in other markets. The station brands as "Pop! Radio 103.5" in reference to its translator at 103.5 FM.
