= Ruble Church =

Historic church in Burning Springs, West Virginia, USA

- U.S. National Register of Historic Places
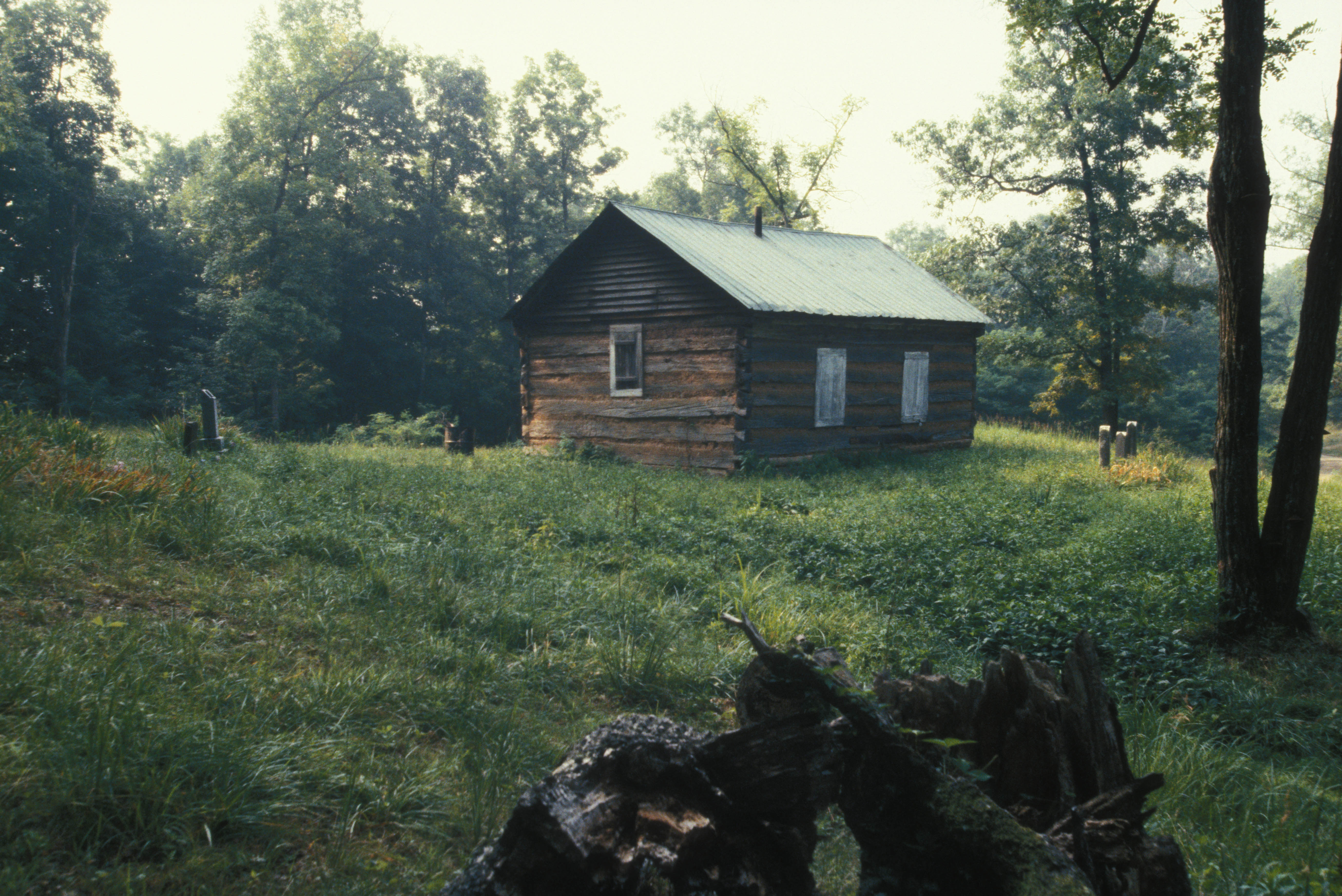

- Location within West Virginia Location within the United States
- Location: Jct. of CR 34/1 and 34/2, Burning Springs, West Virginia
- Coordinates: 39°0′7″N 81°18′29″W
- Area: 0.5 acres (0.20 ha)
- Built: 1854
- NRHP reference No.: 82004332
- Added to NRHP: April 9, 1982

Ruble Church is a historic church at the junction of CR 34/1 and 34/2 in Burning Springs, Wirt County, West Virginia. It was built in 1854, and is a one-story, rectangular, gable-roofed log structure measuring 15 feet (4.6 m) by 25 feet (7.6 m). Also on the property is the church cemetery, in which the oldest graves are dated to 1857–1858.

It was listed on the National Register of Historic Places in 1982.

The church was demolished in September 2020. As of November 2020, it is being reconstructed on the same spot using some of the original logs.
