= Billings, West Virginia =

Unincorporated community in West Virginia, United States

- Unincorporated community
- Location within West Virginia Location within the United States
- Coordinates: 38°51′26″N 81°24′13″W
- Country: United States
- State: West Virginia
- County: Roane
- Elevation: 709 ft (216 m)
- Time zone: UTC-5 (Eastern (EST))
  - Summer (DST): UTC-4 (EDT)
- Area codes: 304 & 681
- GNIS feature ID: 1553904

Billings is an unincorporated community in Roane County, West Virginia, United States. Billings is located on West Virginia Route 14 and the Left Fork Reedy Creek, 4.5 miles (7.2 km) northwest of Spencer.
