= George G. Moore =

- Born: July 2, 1844; Tyler County, West Virginia
- Died: November 26, 1925 (aged 81); Colorado
- Burial place: Eaton Cemetery, Eaton, Colorado
- Military career
- Allegiance: United States
- Branch: United States Army; Union Army
- Rank: Private
- Units: Company D, 11th West Virginia Volunteer Infantry Regiment
- Conflicts: American Civil War • Battle of Fisher's Hill
- Awards: Medal of Honor

George G. Moore (July 2, 1844 – November 26, 1925) was a Union Army soldier during the American Civil War. He received the Medal of Honor for gallantry during the Battle of Fisher's Hill near Strasburg, Virginia fought September 21–22, 1864. The battle was one of the engagements of the Valley Campaigns of 1864.

== Medal of Honor citation ==
“The President of the United States of America, in the name of Congress, takes pleasure in presenting the Medal of Honor to Private George G. Moore, United States Army, for extraordinary heroism on 22 September 1864, while serving with Company D, 11th West Virginia Infantry, in action at Fisher's Hill, Virginia, for capture of flag.”

== See also ==
- List of Medal of Honor recipients
- List of American Civil War Medal of Honor recipients: M-P
