= Two Run, Wirt County, West Virginia =

Two Run
- Unincorporated community
- Location within the state of West Virginia Two Run (the United States)
- Coordinates: 38°57′52″N 81°23′14″W
- Country: United States
- State: West Virginia
- County: Wirt
- Elevation: 650 ft (200 m)
- Time zone: UTC-5 (Eastern (EST))
  - Summer (DST): UTC-4 (EDT)
- GNIS ID: 1678868

Two Run is an unincorporated community in Wirt County, West Virginia, United States.
