= Cherry, West Virginia =

Unincorporated community in West Virginia, United States

Cherry
- Unincorporated community
- Location within the state of West Virginia Cherry (the United States)
- Coordinates: 39°0′21″N 81°20′26″W
- Country: United States
- State: West Virginia
- County: Wirt
- Time zone: UTC-5 (Eastern (EST))
  - Summer (DST): UTC-4 (EDT)

Cherry (also Cherry Ford) is an unincorporated community in Wirt County, West Virginia, United States. Its elevation is 679 feet (207 m).
