= Palestine, Wirt County, West Virginia =

Palestine
- Unincorporated community
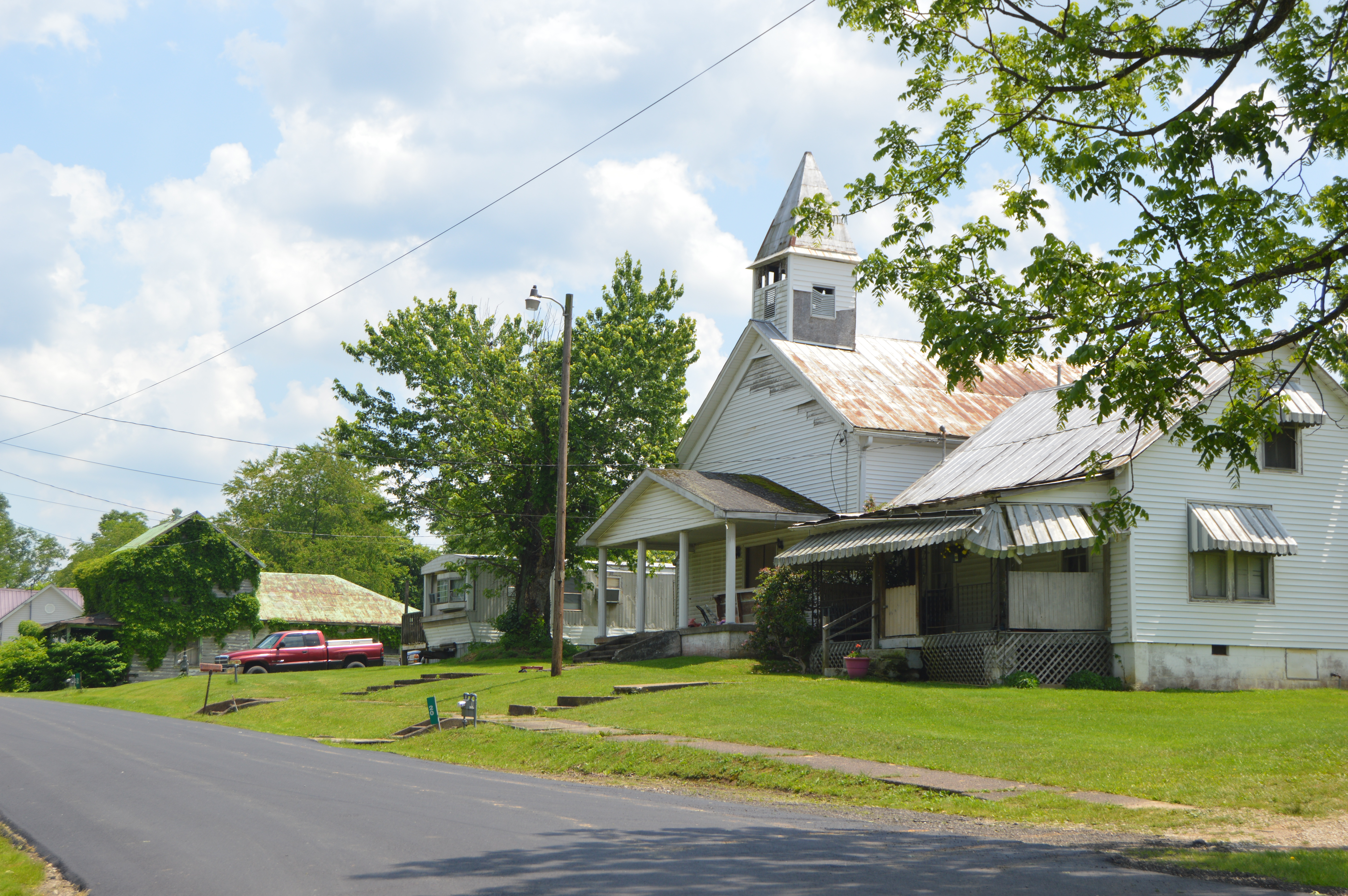
- Buildings on County Route 24
- Etymology: Palestine
- Location in West Virginia Palestine (the United States)
- Coordinates: 39°1′48″N 81°24′24″W
- Country: United States
- State: West Virginia
- County: Wirt
- Time zone: UTC-5 (Eastern (EST))
  - Summer (DST): UTC-4 (EDT)
- ZIP codes: 26160

Palestine is an unincorporated community in Wirt County, West Virginia, United States. It is located at the confluence of the Little Kanawha River and Reedy Creek, at 39°01′48″N 81°24′24″W, at an elevation of 682 feet (208 m). Its ZIP code is 26160. The community was named after Palestine.

Prior to 1905, the name of Palestine's post office was Reedy Ripple, to distinguish its name from a community named "Palatine" in Marion County; the name "Reedy Ripple" derived from an accumulation of gravel in the Little Kanawha River at the mouth of Reedy Creek. Palestine gained notice in 2003 for being the hometown of Jessica Lynch.

The Buffalo Church near Palestine was listed on the National Register of Historic Places in 1990.
