= Reedy, West Virginia =

- Town
- Location of Reedy in Roane County, West Virginia.
- Coordinates: 38°53′56″N 81°25′37″W
- Country: United States
- State: West Virginia
- County: Roane

Area
  - Total: 0.19 sq mi (0.50 km^{2})
  - Land: 0.19 sq mi (0.50 km^{2})
  - Water: 0 sq mi (0.00 km^{2})
- Elevation: 679 ft (207 m)

Population (2020)
  - Total: 150
  - Estimate (2021): 151
  - Density: 827.5/sq mi (319.49/km^{2})
- Time zone: UTC-5 (Eastern (EST))
  - Summer (DST): UTC-4 (EDT)
- ZIP code: 25270
- Area code: 304
- FIPS code: 54-67660
- GNIS feature ID: 1545488

Reedy is a town in Roane County, West Virginia, United States. The population was 152 at the 2020 census.

The community was named after nearby Reedy Creek.

== Geography ==
Reedy is located at 38°53′56″N 81°25′37″W (38.898895, -81.427037), at the confluence of the left, middle, and right forks of Reedy Creek, a tributary of the Little Kanawha River.

According to the United States Census Bureau, the town has a total area of 0.20 square miles (0.52 km^{2}), all land.

== Demographics ==
Historical population
Census	Pop.	Note	%±
1900	300		—
1910	313		4.3%
1920	373		19.2%
1930	405		8.6%
1940	329		−18.8%
1950	352		7.0%
1960	352		0.0%
1970	351		−0.3%
1980	338		−3.7%
1990	271		−19.8%
2000	198		−26.9%
2010	182		−8.1%
2020	150		−17.6%
2021 (est.)	151	▲	0.7%
U.S. Decennial Census

=== 2010 census ===
As of the census of 2010, there were 182 people, 72 households, and 52 families living in the town. The population density was 910.0 inhabitants per square mile (351.4/km^{2}). There were 79 housing units at an average density of 395.0 per square mile (152.5/km^{2}). The racial makeup of the town was 97.8% White, 1.6% African American, and 0.5% from two or more races. Hispanic or Latino of any race were 1.1% of the population.

There were 72 households, of which 29.2% had children under the age of 18 living with them, 55.6% were married couples living together, 12.5% had a female householder with no husband present, 4.2% had a male householder with no wife present, and 27.8% were non-families. 23.6% of all households were made up of individuals, and 11.1% had someone living alone who was 65 years of age or older. The average household size was 2.53 and the average family size was 2.85.

The median age in the town was 42.3 years. 24.7% of residents were under the age of 18; 7.1% were between the ages of 18 and 24; 23.5% were from 25 to 44; 27.5% were from 45 to 64; and 17% were 65 years of age or older. The gender makeup of the town was 49.5% male and 50.5% female.

=== 2000 census ===
As of the census of 2000, there were 198 people, 95 households, and 55 families living in the town. The population density was 897.0 inhabitants per square mile (347.5/km^{2}). There were 116 housing units at an average density of 525.5 per square mile (203.6/km^{2}). The racial makeup of the town was 99.49% White and 0.51% Native American.

There were 95 households, out of which 17.9% had children under the age of 18 living with them, 50.5% were married couples living together, 6.3% had a female householder with no husband present, and 41.1% were non-families. 36.8% of all households were made up of individuals, and 23.2% had someone living alone who was 65 years of age or older. The average household size was 2.08 and the average family size was 2.73.

In the town, the population was spread out, with 14.6% under the age of 18, 7.6% from 18 to 24, 20.7% from 25 to 44, 36.9% from 45 to 64, and 20.2% who were 65 years of age or older. The median age was 49 years. For every 100 females, there were 92.2 males. For every 100 females age 18 and over, there were 85.7 males.

The median income for a household in the town was $17,000, and the median income for a family was $19,583. Males had a median income of $26,875 versus $17,500 for females. The per capita income for the town was $9,734. About 27.5% of families and 35.4% of the population were below the poverty line, including 45.2% of those under the age of eighteen and 23.3% of those 65 or over.
