= Wirt County Courthouse =

Historic place in West Virginia, United States

- U.S. National Register of Historic Places
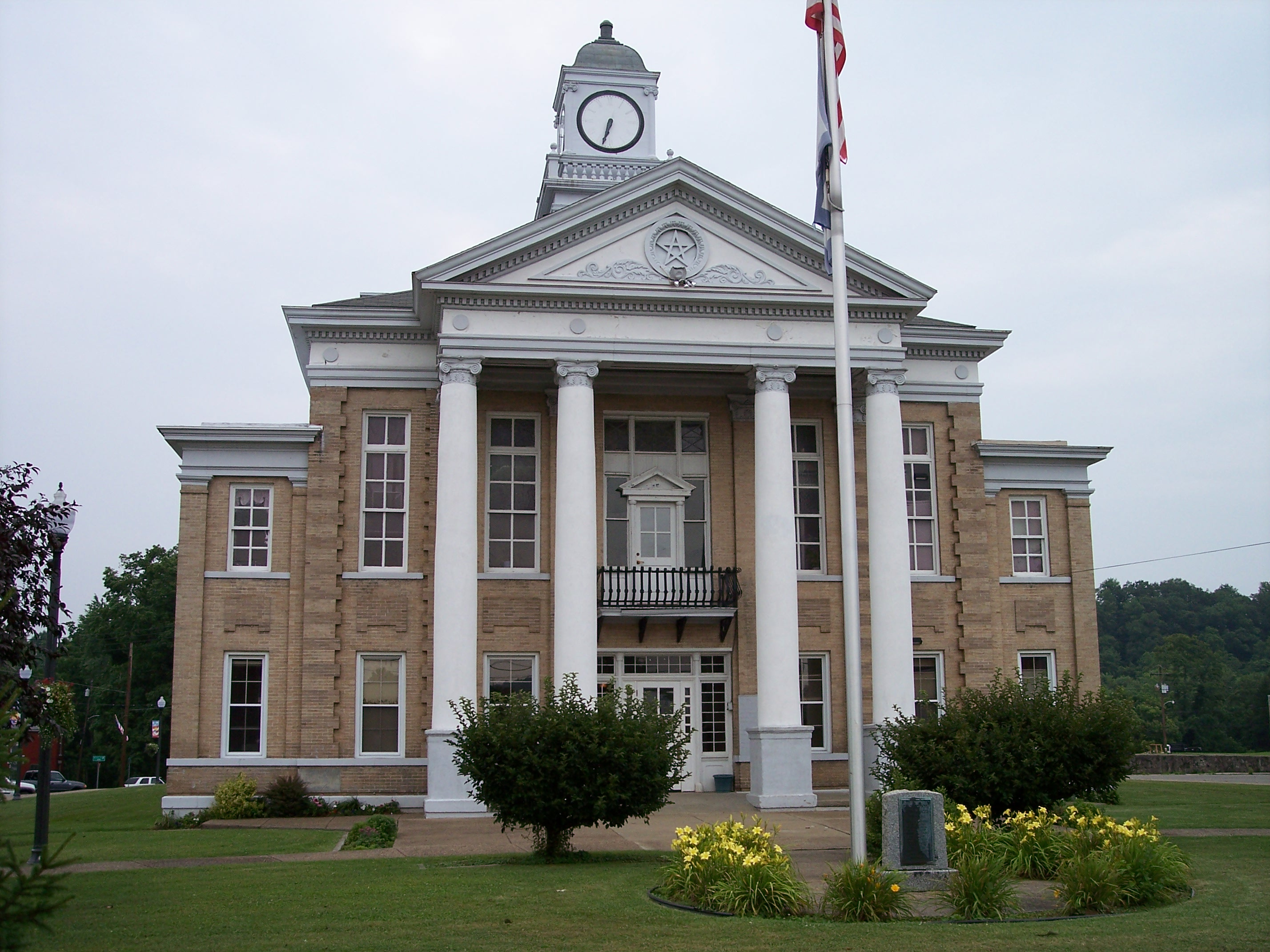

- Location within West Virginia Location within the United States
- Interactive map showing the location of Wirt County Courthouse
- Location: Elizabeth, West Virginia
- Coordinates: 39°3′48″N 81°23′40″W
- Built: 1911
- Architect: Smith Fireproof Construction
- Architectural style: Classical Revival
- MPS: County Courthouses of West Virginia MPS
- NRHP reference No.: 04000918
- Added to NRHP: August 25, 2004

The Wirt County Courthouse in Elizabeth, West Virginia was built to replace a courthouse that burned May 15, 1910. The new neoclassical courthouse was designed by B.F. Smith and subsequently built by his company. The courthouse is the most significant building in the small community of Elizabeth, with a population of less than 1000. The brick courthouse features a two-story columned pediment and is surmounted by a clock tower.
