= Smithville, West Virginia =

Smithville
- Unincorporated community
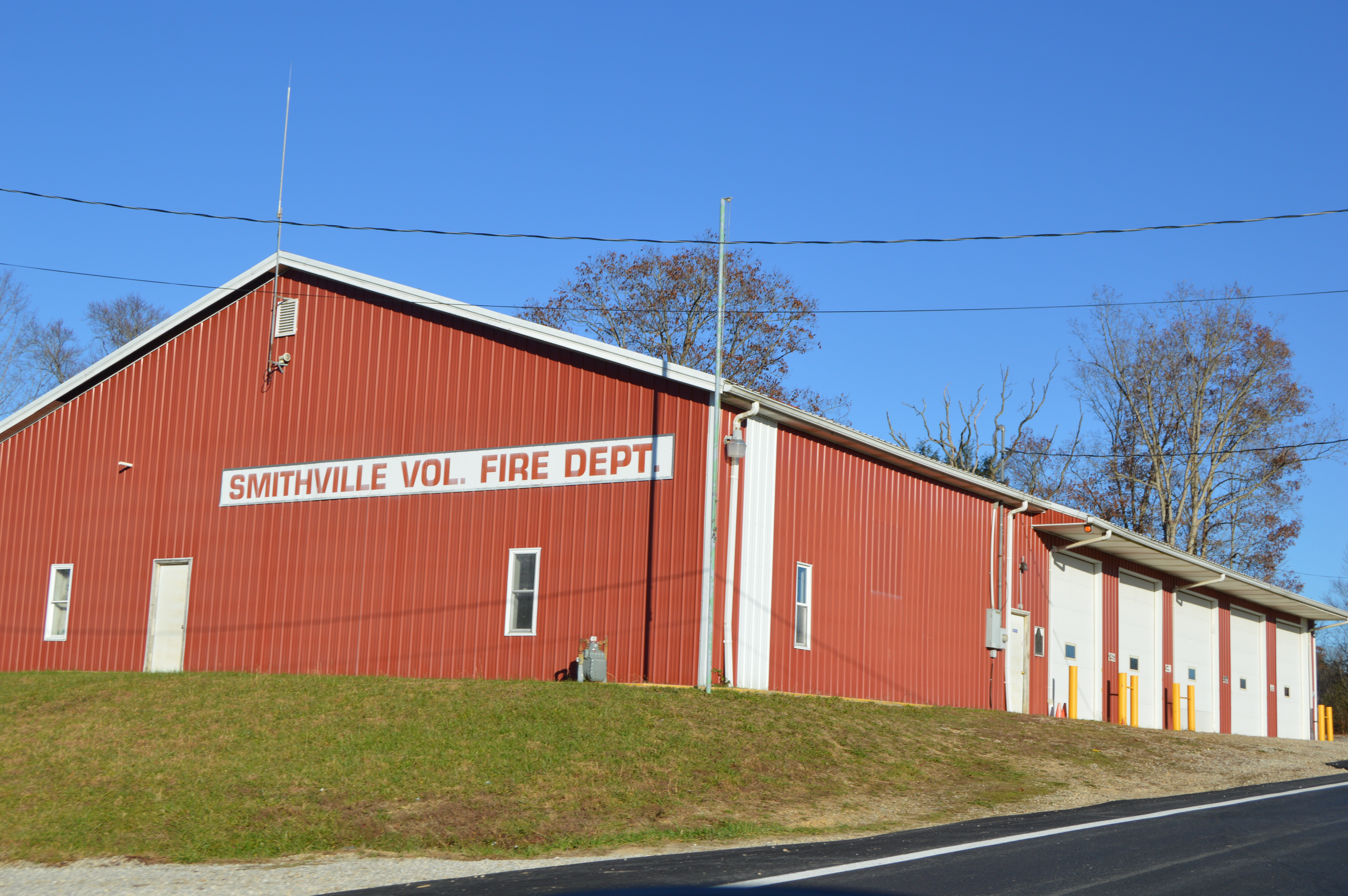
- Fire station on WV 47

- Location within the state of West Virginia Smithville (the United States)
- Coordinates: 39°4′26″N 81°5′39″W
- Country: United States
- State: West Virginia
- County: Ritchie
- Time zone: UTC-5 (Eastern (EST))
  - Summer (DST): UTC-4 (EDT)
- ZIP codes: 26178

Smithville is an unincorporated community in southern Ritchie County, West Virginia, United States. It lies along West Virginia Route 47 south of the town of Harrisville, the county seat of Ritchie County. Its elevation is 686 feet (209 m). It has a post office with the ZIP code 26178.

The community was named after Barnes Smith, Sr., the original owner of the town site.
