= Wirt County, West Virginia =

County in West Virginia, United States

- County
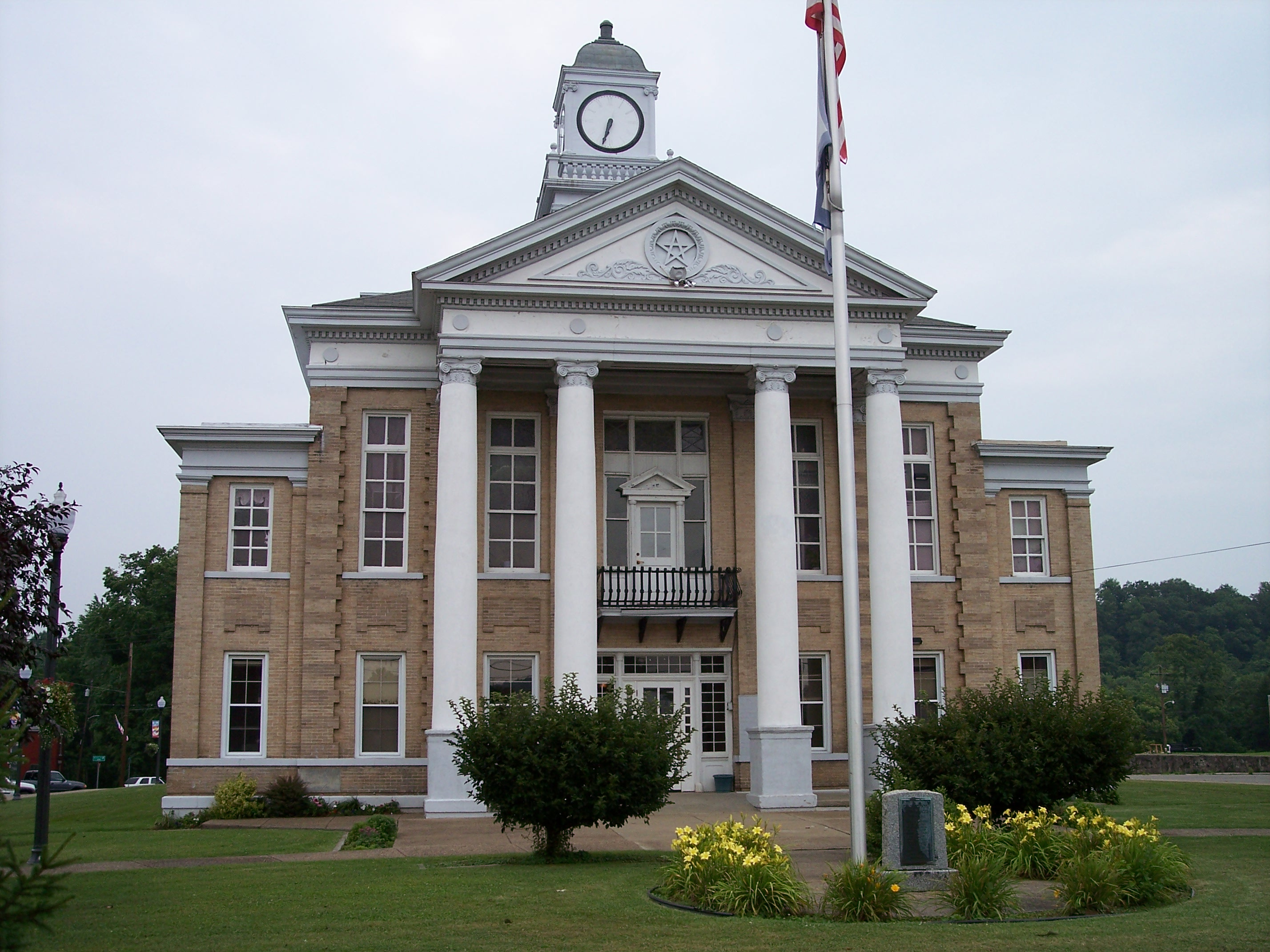
- The Wirt County Courthouse in Elizabeth

- Seal

- Location within the U.S. state of West Virginia
- Coordinates: 39°01′N 81°23′W
- Country: United States
- State: West Virginia
- Founded: January 19, 1848
- Named for: William Wirt
- Seat: Elizabeth
- Largest town: Elizabeth

Area
  - Total: 235 sq mi (610 km^{2})
  - Land: 233 sq mi (600 km^{2})
  - Water: 2.3 sq mi (6.0 km^{2}) 1.0%

Population (2020)
  - Total: 5,194
  - Estimate (2025): 4,879 ▼
  - Density: 22.3/sq mi (8.61/km^{2})
- Time zone: UTC−5 (Eastern)
  - Summer (DST): UTC−4 (EDT)
- Congressional district: 2nd
- Website: wirtcounty.wv.gov

Wirt County is a county in the U.S. state of West Virginia. As of the 2020 census, the population was 5,194, making it the least populous county in West Virginia. Its county seat is Elizabeth. The county was created in 1848 by the Virginia General Assembly and named for U.S. Attorney General and presidential candidate William Wirt. The Wirt County Schools are served by one high school, Wirt County High School.

Wirt County is part of the Parkersburg-Vienna, WV Metropolitan Statistical Area.

== History ==
Wirt County was created from parts of Jackson and Wood counties on January 19, 1848. The county was named after William Wirt (1772–1834).

The first European pioneer was William Beauchamp (1743–1808), a veteran of the Continental Navy and a Methodist minister. Beauchamp arrived in 1796 with a claim to 1400 acres on the Little Kanawha River. He farmed, built a mill, and laid out the town of Elizabeth, named after his daughter.

Burning Springs was the site of an oil rush in the 1860s. In 1863 the town was burned, along with 100,000 gallons of oil, by Confederate cavalrymen.

On June 20, 1863, at the height of the Civil War, Wirt County was one of fifty Virginia counties admitted to the Union as the state of West Virginia. Later that year, West Virginia's counties were divided into civil townships, with the intention of encouraging local government. This proved impractical in the heavily rural state, and in 1872 the townships were converted into magisterial districts. Wirt County was divided into seven districts: Burning Springs, Clay, Elizabeth, Newark, Reedy, Spring Creek, and Tucker. Except for minor adjustments, the seven historic magisterial districts remained largely unchanged for over a century. In the 1980s, they were consolidated into three new districts: Central, Northeast, and Southwest.

== Geography ==
According to the United States Census Bureau, the county has a total area of 235 square miles (610 km^{2}), of which 233 square miles (600 km^{2}) is land and 2.3 square miles (6.0 km^{2}) (1.0%) is water.

=== Major highways ===
- West Virginia Route 5
- West Virginia Route 14
- West Virginia Route 47
- West Virginia Route 53

=== Adjacent counties ===
- Wood County (northwest)
- Ritchie County (northeast)
- Calhoun County (southeast)
- Roane County (south)
- Jackson County (southwest)

== Demographics ==
Historical population
Census	Pop.	Note	%±
1850	3,353		—
1860	3,751		11.9%
1870	4,804		28.1%
1880	7,104		47.9%
1890	9,411		32.5%
1900	10,284		9.3%
1910	9,047		−12.0%
1920	7,536		−16.7%
1930	6,358		−15.6%
1940	6,475		1.8%
1950	5,119		−20.9%
1960	4,391		−14.2%
1970	4,154		−5.4%
1980	4,922		18.5%
1990	5,192		5.5%
2000	5,873		13.1%
2010	5,717		−2.7%
2020	5,194		−9.1%
2025 (est.)	4,879	▼	−6.1%
U.S. Decennial Census; 1790–1960 1900–1990; 1990–2000 2010–2020

=== 2020 census ===
As of the 2020 census, the county had a population of 5,194. Of the residents, 20.9% were under the age of 18 and 20.9% were 65 years of age or older; the median age was 47.4 years. For every 100 females there were 100.3 males, and for every 100 females age 18 and over there were 99.2 males.

The racial makeup of the county was 96.5% White, 0.1% Black or African American, 0.1% American Indian and Alaska Native, none Asian, 0.2% from some other race, and 3.0% from two or more races. Hispanic or Latino residents of any race comprised 0.4% of the population.

There were 2,211 households in the county, of which 26.7% had children under the age of 18 living with them and 22.4% had a female householder with no spouse or partner present. About 26.8% of all households were made up of individuals and 13.0% had someone living alone who was 65 years of age or older.

There were 2,702 housing units, of which 18.2% were vacant. Among occupied housing units, 80.8% were owner-occupied and 19.2% were renter-occupied. The homeowner vacancy rate was 1.0% and the rental vacancy rate was 4.2%.

Wirt County, West Virginia – Racial and ethnic composition Note: the US Census treats Hispanic/Latino as an ethnic category. This table excludes Latinos from the racial categories and assigns them to a separate category. Hispanics/Latinos may be of any race.
Race / Ethnicity (NH = Non-Hispanic)	Pop 2000	Pop 2010	Pop 2020	% 2000	% 2010	% 2020
White alone (NH)	5,771	5,610	4,999	98.26%	98.13%	96.25%
Black or African American alone (NH)	17	9	6	0.29%	0.16%	0.12%
Native American or Alaska Native alone (NH)	12	12	4	0.20%	0.21%	0.08%
Asian alone (NH)	5	10	0	0.09%	0.17%	0.00%
Pacific Islander alone (NH)	0	1	4	0.00%	0.02%	0.08%
Other race alone (NH)	6	0	8	0.10%	0.00%	0.15%
Mixed race or Multiracial (NH)	44	49	151	0.75%	0.86%	2.91%
Hispanic or Latino (any race)	18	26	22	0.31%	0.45%	0.42%
Total	5,873	5,717	5,194	100.00%	100.00%	100.00%

=== 2010 census ===
As of the 2010 United States census, there were 5,717 people, 2,391 households, and 1,689 families living in the county. The population density was 24.6 inhabitants per square mile (9.5/km^{2}). There were 3,231 housing units at an average density of 13.9 units per square mile (5.4 units/km^{2}). The racial makeup of the county was 97.5% white, 1.5% black or African American, 1.7% two or more races, 0.2% Asian, 0.2% American Indian. Those of Hispanic or Latino origin made up 0.5% of the population. In terms of ancestry, 23.5% were American, 23.0% were German, 12.4% were Irish, and 9.3% were English.

Of the 2,391 households, 28.7% had children under the age of 18 living with them, 56.1% were married couples living together, 9.5% had a female householder with no husband present, 29.4% were non-families, and 25.2% of all households were made up of individuals. The average household size was 2.39 and the average family size was 2.82. The median age was 44.4 years.

The median income for a household in the county was $36,705 and the median income for a family was $43,517. Males had a median income of $35,829 versus $28,460 for females. The per capita income for the county was $18,438. About 11.8% of families and 19.2% of the population were below the poverty line, including 31.6% of those under age 18 and 8.3% of those age 65 or over.

=== 2000 census ===
As of the census of 2000, there were 5,873 people, 2,284 households, and 1,699 families living in the county. The population density was 25 inhabitants per square mile (9.7/km^{2}). There were 3,266 housing units at an average density of 14 units per square mile (5.4 units/km^{2}). The racial makeup of the county was 98.55% White, 0.29% Black or African American, 0.20% Native American, 0.10% Asian, 0.10% from other races, and 0.75% from two or more races. 0.31% of the population were Hispanic or Latino of any race.

There were 2,284 households, out of which 35.20% had children under the age of 18 living with them, 61.50% were married couples living together, 8.90% had a female householder with no husband present, and 25.60% were non-families. 22.20% of all households were made up of individuals, and 11.60% had someone living alone who was 65 years of age or older. The average household size was 2.56 and the average family size was 2.97.

In the county, the population was spread out, with 25.40% under the age of 18, 7.60% from 18 to 24, 29.60% from 25 to 44, 24.40% from 45 to 64, and 13.00% who were 65 years of age or older. The median age was 38 years. For every 100 females there were 100.20 males. For every 100 females age 18 and over, there were 97.00 males.

The median income for a household in the county was $30,748, and the median income for a family was $33,872. Males had a median income of $29,088 versus $17,965 for females. The per capita income for the county was $14,000. About 17.00% of families and 19.60% of the population were below the poverty line, including 25.60% of those under age 18 and 13.90% of those age 65 or over.

== Politics ==
United States presidential election results for Wirt County, West Virginia
Year	Republican		Democratic		Third party(ies)	
Year	No.	%	No.	%	No.	%
1912	213	10.89%	953	48.72%	790	40.39%
1916	951	46.73%	1,072	52.68%	12	0.59%
1920	1,680	54.88%	1,376	44.95%	5	0.16%
1924	1,491	48.03%	1,587	51.13%	26	0.84%
1928	1,561	54.41%	1,272	44.34%	36	1.25%
1932	1,486	42.75%	1,944	55.93%	46	1.32%
1936	1,612	47.23%	1,783	52.24%	18	0.53%
1940	1,818	53.91%	1,554	46.09%	0	0.00%
1944	1,418	54.79%	1,170	45.21%	0	0.00%
1948	1,291	50.99%	1,233	48.70%	8	0.32%
1952	1,474	58.40%	1,050	41.60%	0	0.00%
1956	1,444	54.95%	1,184	45.05%	0	0.00%
1960	1,347	56.31%	1,045	43.69%	0	0.00%
1964	899	41.14%	1,286	58.86%	0	0.00%
1968	1,051	52.26%	820	40.78%	140	6.96%
1972	1,442	67.60%	691	32.40%	0	0.00%
1976	1,031	46.59%	1,182	53.41%	0	0.00%
1980	1,176	51.29%	1,058	46.14%	59	2.57%
1984	1,450	62.45%	868	37.38%	4	0.17%
1988	1,125	54.45%	929	44.97%	12	0.58%
1992	939	39.42%	1,043	43.79%	400	16.79%
1996	928	43.55%	906	42.52%	297	13.94%
2000	1,518	63.73%	818	34.34%	46	1.93%
2004	1,727	65.07%	896	33.76%	31	1.17%
2008	1,496	64.32%	782	33.62%	48	2.06%
2012	1,427	65.73%	676	31.14%	68	3.13%
2016	1,911	78.90%	386	15.94%	125	5.16%
2020	2,134	80.44%	466	17.57%	53	2.00%
2024	2,120	82.14%	409	15.85%	52	2.01%

== Notable people ==
- Howard B. Lee- served as the Republican Attorney General of West Virginia from 1925 to 1933. His efforts to eliminate government corruption during that time helped to end the West Virginia Mine Wars.
- Jessica Dawn Lynch (born April 26, 1983) is an American teacher, actress, and former United States Army soldier who served in the 2003 invasion of Iraq as a private first class.

- Charles Brooks Smith - was a Union Army veteran, businessman and Republican politician who served in the United States House of Representatives for a single term from West Virginia's 4th congressional district.

== Communities ==
=== Town ===
- Elizabeth (county seat)

=== Magisterial districts ===
==== Current ====
- Central
- Northeast
- Southwest

==== Historic ====
- Burning Springs
- Clay
- Elizabeth
- Newark
- Reedy
- Spring Creek
- Tucker

=== Census-designated place ===
- Newark

=== Unincorporated communities ===
- Adriengrad
- Beaverdam
- Beulah Hill
- Brohard
- Burning Springs
- Cherry
- Creston
- Enterprise
- Freeport
- Garfield
- Greencastle
- Hilbert
- Ivan
- Lucile
- McClain
- Morristown
- Munday
- Palestine
- Peewee
- Rover
- Sanoma
- Two Run
- Windy
- Zackville

== See also ==
- Hughes River Wildlife Management Area
- National Register of Historic Places listings in Wirt County, West Virginia
