= Elizabeth, West Virginia =

- Town
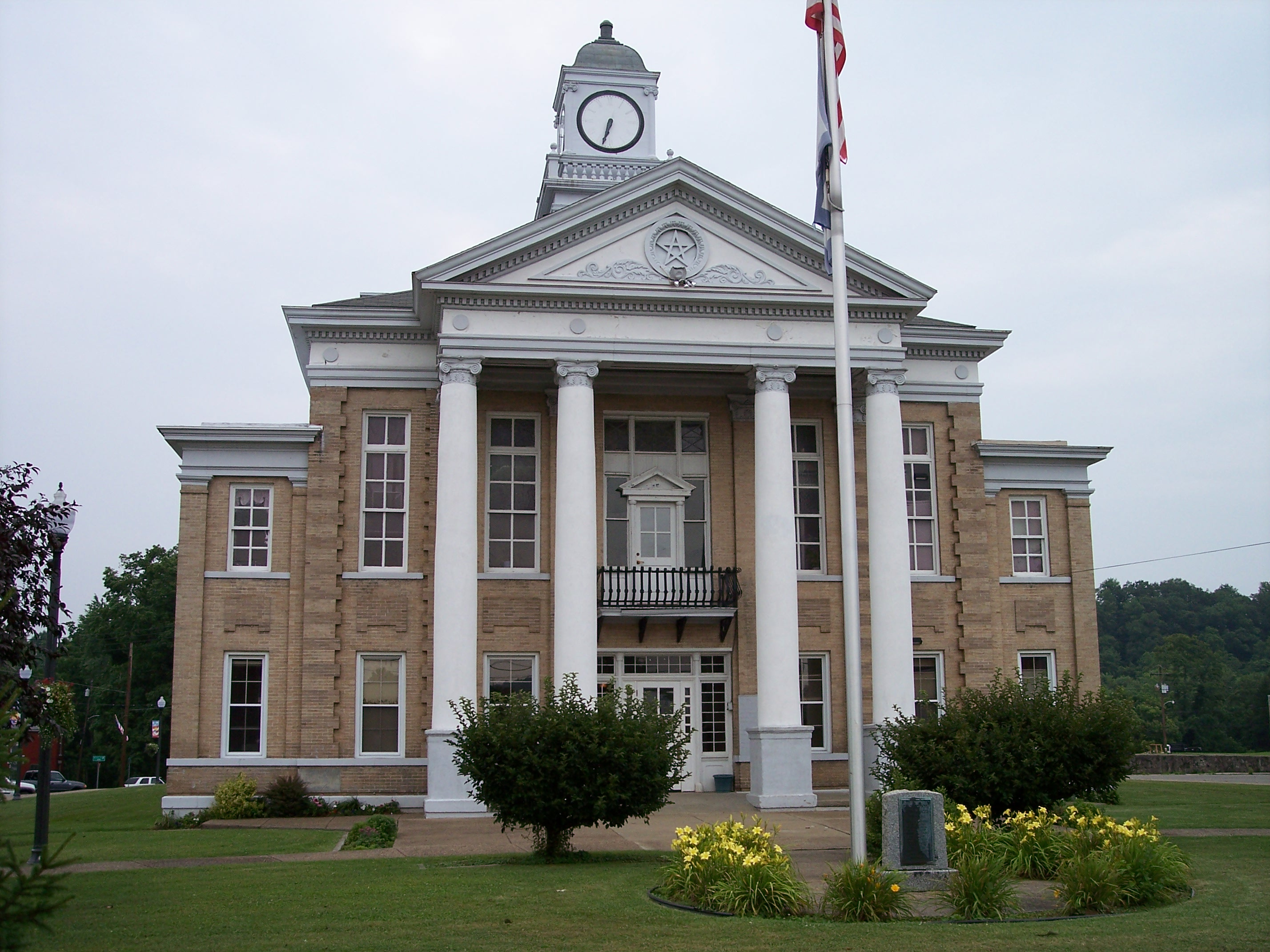
- Wirt County Courthouse
- Interactive map of Elizabeth, West Virginia
- Location within West Virginia Location within the United States
- Coordinates: 39°3′46″N 81°23′44″W
- Country: United States
- State: West Virginia
- County: Wirt

Area
  - Total: 0.51 sq mi (1.31 km^{2})
  - Land: 0.47 sq mi (1.22 km^{2})
  - Water: 0.031 sq mi (0.08 km^{2})
- Elevation: 646 ft (197 m)

Population (2020)
  - Total: 724
  - Estimate (2021): 706
  - Density: 1,772.8/sq mi (684.48/km^{2})
- Time zone: UTC-5 (Eastern (EST))
  - Summer (DST): UTC-4 (EDT)
- ZIP code: 26143
- Area code: 304
- FIPS code: 54-24364
- GNIS feature ID: 1538603
- Website: https://www.elizabethwv.net/

Elizabeth is a town in and the county seat of Wirt County, West Virginia, United States, situated along the Little Kanawha River. The population was 724 as of the 2020 census.

== History ==
The site of Elizabeth was first settled by William Beauchamp (1743-1808) in 1796 when it was still part of the original, vast Harrison County, Virginia. It was known as "Beauchamp's Mills" until 1817 when it was renamed for Elizabeth (Woodyard) Beauchamp (1780-1838), the wife of William's son David Beauchamp (1776-1828). Elizabeth was chartered by the Virginia General Assembly in 1822 and became the county seat when Wirt County was created in 1848.

== Geography ==
Elizabeth is located at 39°3′46″N 81°23′44″W (39.062852, -81.395529).

According to the United States Census Bureau, the town has a total area of 0.53 square miles (1.37 km^{2}), of which 0.47 square miles (1.22 km^{2}) is land and 0.06 square miles (0.16 km^{2}) is water.

=== Climate ===
The climate in this area is characterized by hot, humid summers and generally cool winters. According to the Köppen Climate Classification system, Elizabeth has a humid continental climate, abbreviated "Cfa" on climate maps.

== Demographics ==
Historical population
Census	Pop.	Note	%±
1880	395		—
1890	710		79.7%
1900	657		−7.5%
1910	674		2.6%
1920	681		1.0%
1930	716		5.1%
1940	685		−4.3%
1950	755		10.2%
1960	727		−3.7%
1970	821		12.9%
1980	856		4.3%
1990	900		5.1%
2000	994		10.4%
2010	823		−17.2%
2020	724		−12.0%
2021 (est.)	706	▼	−2.5%
U.S. Decennial Census

=== 2010 census ===
As of the census of 2010, there were 823 people, 377 households, and 228 families living in the town. The population density was 1,751.1 inhabitants per square mile (676.1/km^{2}). There were 437 housing units at an average density of 929.8 per square mile (359.0/km^{2}). The racial makeup of the town was 98.4% White, 0.7% Asian, and 0.9% from two or more races. Hispanic or Latino of any race were 0.2% of the population.

There were 377 households, of which 28.4% had children under the age of 18 living with them, 39.3% were married couples living together, 17.2% had a female householder with no husband present, 4.0% had a male householder with no wife present, and 39.5% were non-families. 36.3% of all households were made up of individuals, and 18.5% had someone living alone who was 65 years of age or older. The average household size was 2.18 and the average family size was 2.79.

The median age in the town was 40.7 years. 22.6% of residents were under the age of 18; 8.1% were between the ages of 18 and 24; 25% were from 25 to 44; 27.1% were from 45 to 64; and 17.1% were 65 years of age or older. The gender makeup of the town was 47.0% male and 53.0% female.

=== 2000 census ===
As of the census of 2000, there were 994 people, 408 households, and 261 families living in the town. The population density was 2,091.3 inhabitants per square mile (799.6 /km^{2}). There were 466 housing units at an average density of 980.4 per square mile (374.8 /km^{2}). The racial makeup of the town was 99.20% White, 0.10% African American, 0.20% Native American, 0.30% from other races, and 0.20% from two or more races.

There were 408 households, out of which 37.5% had children under the age of 18 living with them, 43.9% were married couples living together, 15.9% had a female householder with no husband present, and 36.0% were non-families. 33.3% of all households were made up of individuals, and 19.9% had someone living alone who was 65 years of age or older. The average household size was 2.38 and the average family size was 2.98.

In the town, the population was spread out, with 28.3% under the age of 18, 8.2% from 18 to 24, 29.1% from 25 to 44, 19.7% from 45 to 64, and 14.7% who were 65 years of age or older. The median age was 34 years. For every 100 females there were 84.8 males. For every 100 females age 18 and over, there were 76.5 males.

The median income for a household in the town was $25,114, and the median income for a family was $30,104. Males had a median income of $24,306 versus $17,813 for females. The per capita income for the town was $12,704. About 20.2% of families and 23.8% of the population were below the poverty line, including 23.0% of those under age 18 and 18.5% of those age 65 or over.
