= Rollyson, West Virginia =

- Unincorporated community
- Location within West Virginia Location within the United States
- Coordinates: 38°47′00″N 80°38′27″W
- Country: United States
- State: West Virginia
- County: Braxton
- Elevation: 830 ft (250 m)
- Time zone: UTC-5 (Eastern (EST))
  - Summer (DST): UTC-4 (EDT)
- Area codes: 304 & 681
- GNIS feature ID: 1549903

Rollyson is an unincorporated community in Braxton County, West Virginia, United States. Rollyson is located along West Virginia Route 5, the CSX Railroad, and Saltlick Creek, 4.2 miles (6.8 km) north of Flatwoods.

The community was named after Major William Rollyson, a local merchant.
