= Saltlick Creek (Little Kanawha River tributary) =

- Location of the mouth of Saltlick Creek in Burnsville, West Virginia

Location
- Country: United States
- State: West Virginia
- County: Braxton

Physical characteristics
- Source
  - location: south of Flatwoods
  - coordinates: 38.6956554°N 80.6542611°W
  - elevation: 1,303 ft (397 m)
- Mouth: Little Kanawha River
  - location: Burnsville
  - coordinates: 38.8567624°N 80.6562068°W
  - elevation: 741 ft (226 m)
- Length: 17.7 mi (28.5 km)
- Basin size: 49 sq mi (130 km^{2})

Saltlick Creek is a tributary of the Little Kanawha River, 17.7 miles (28.5 km) long, located in central West Virginia in the United States. Via the Little Kanawha and Ohio rivers, it is part of the watershed of the Mississippi River, draining an area of 49 square miles (130 km^{2}) in a rural region on the unglaciated portion of the Allegheny Plateau.

Saltlick Creek flows for its entire length in Braxton County. It rises approximately 2 miles (3.2 km) south of Flatwoods and flows generally northward, through the communities of Corley, Rollyson, and Gem to its mouth at the Little Kanawha River in Burnsville. Downstream of Rollyson, the creek is paralleled by West Virginia Route 5.

According to the West Virginia Department of Environmental Protection, approximately 80% of the Saltlick Creek watershed is forested, mostly deciduous. Approximately 18% is used for pasture and agriculture.

According to the Geographic Names Information System, Saltlick Creek has historically been known by the variant names "Salt Lick," "Salt Lick Creek," "Salt Lick Fork," and "Saltlick Fork." The creek was named for a nearby mineral lick.

== See also ==
- List of rivers of West Virginia
