= Strange Creek =

Strange Creek may refer to:

- Strange Creek (West Virginia), a stream
- Strange Creek, West Virginia, an unincorporated community
