= Gem, West Virginia =

Unincorporated community in West Virginia, United States

- Unincorporated community
- Location within West Virginia Location within the United States
- Coordinates: 38°49′45″N 80°40′03″W
- Country: United States
- State: West Virginia
- County: Braxton
- Elevation: 774 ft (236 m)
- Time zone: UTC-5 (Eastern (EST))
  - Summer (DST): UTC-4 (EDT)
- Area codes: 304 & 681
- GNIS feature ID: 1560647

Gem is an unincorporated community in Braxton County, West Virginia, United States. Gem is located on West Virginia Route 5, the CSX Railroad, and Saltlick Creek, 2 miles (3.2 km) south of Burnsville.

Early variant names were Coger Bluff and Coger Station. The present name is derived from the name of G. E. McCoy, a pioneer citizen.
