= Little Otter =

Little Otter may refer to:

- Little Otter, West Virginia
- Little Otter River (Canada)
- Little Otter River (Virginia)
- Little Otter Creek
