= Frametown, West Virginia =

Unincorporated community in West Virginia, United States

Frametown
- Unincorporated community
- Location within the state of West Virginia Frametown (the United States)
- Coordinates: 38°38′16″N 80°51′30″W
- Country: United States
- State: West Virginia
- County: Braxton
- Time zone: UTC-5 (Eastern (EST))
  - Summer (DST): UTC-4 (EDT)
- GNIS feature ID: 1539222

Frametown is an unincorporated community in Braxton County, West Virginia, United States. While the heart of Frametown itself is rather small, there is a large sprawling area that considers itself to be part of the Frametown community. This is due to the large range of the United States Postal Service ZIP Code 26623 which covers the immediate area.

As stated, there really is no "downtown Frametown", and there are no stoplights. The primary points of interest, would be a restaurant: "Granny's Kitchen", a post office, and the Frametown Elementary School.

Frametown is centered on the intersection of Interstate 79 and West Virginia Route 4. The closest neighboring incorporated towns are Flatwoods, Sutton, and Gassaway.

According to the GNIS, Frametown has also been known throughout its history as Frame Mill, Frames, and Frames Mill. The community was named after the local Frame family.

The story goes that James Frame and another man in 1797 had camped there and were hunting along the Elk River in western Virginia when they became separated. Thinking that his friend had been killed James headed back to Augusta County, Virginia and found the man who owned the land that he and his friend had been hunting on. The man agreed to sell James the land and he went back to his little cabin on the Elk River and proceeded to build a water mill. The place became known as Frame's Mill. James married in 1801 and had a large family all of which stayed on his land, which after a while became Frametown.
