= Heaters, West Virginia =

Heaters
- Unincorporated community
- Location within the state of West Virginia Heaters (the United States)
- Coordinates: 38°45′42″N 80°38′29″W
- Country: United States
- State: West Virginia
- County: Braxton
- Time zone: UTC-5 (Eastern (EST))
  - Summer (DST): UTC-4 (EDT)
- ZIP codes: 26627

Heaters is an unincorporated community in Braxton County, West Virginia, United States. Heaters is situated approximately three miles north of Flatwoods on U.S. Route 19, which is a paved two-lane road. Access from I-79 is at exit 67 in Flatwoods, or exit 79 at Burnsville, then Route 5 to Heaters. There are no stoplight in Heaters. Heaters has a United States Postal Service post office and the ZIP Code is 26627.

Prior to the construction of I-79 in 1974, US-19 was the main road between Morgantown and Charleston, and Heaters was a convenient place to stop. At its peak, Heaters had a gas station, a general store, and a lunch restaurant. All are now gone. Heaters does have a community center located at 4350 Gauley Turnpike, which is used for community gatherings such as potluck dinners, memorial service dinners, and fundraising dinners.

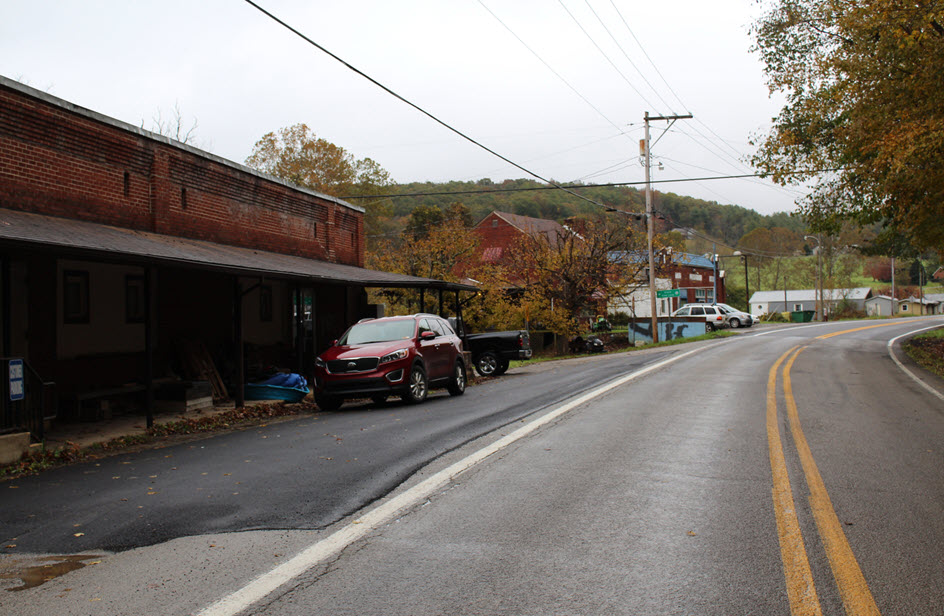
Heaters, West Virginia.

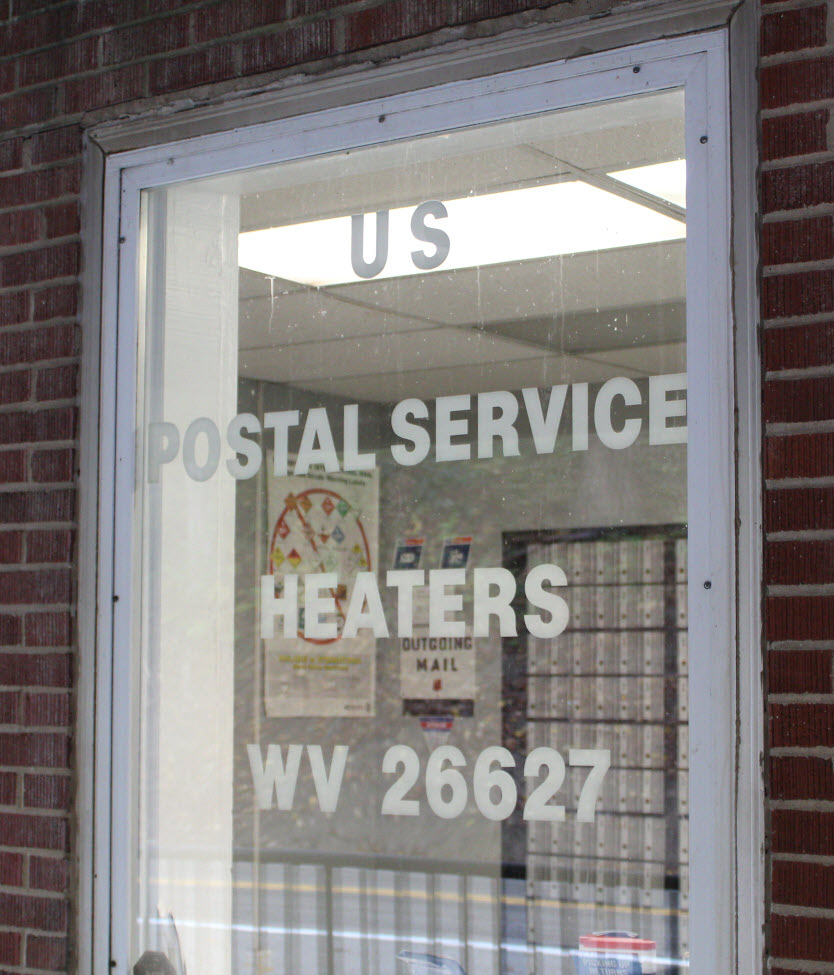
US Post Office for Heaters, WV.

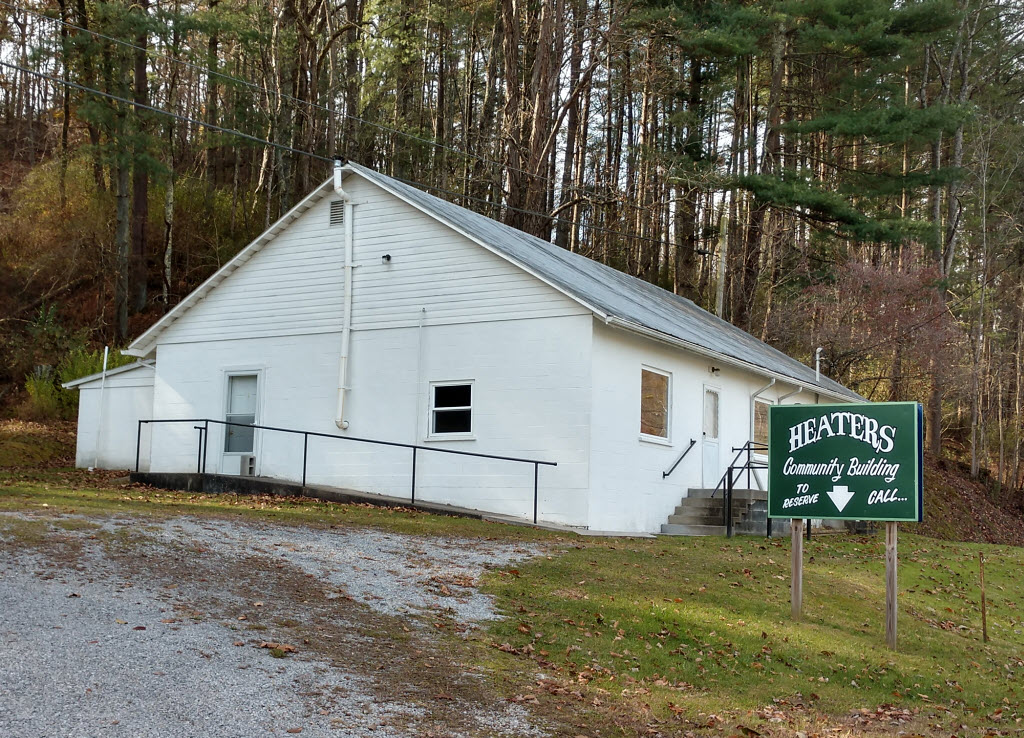
Heaters Community Building

== History ==
The community was named after the local Heater family.

== Industry ==
Weyerhaeuser operates an oriented strand board (OSB) plant in Heaters. On the Weyerhaeuser website, it is listed as the "Sutton OSB Mill.

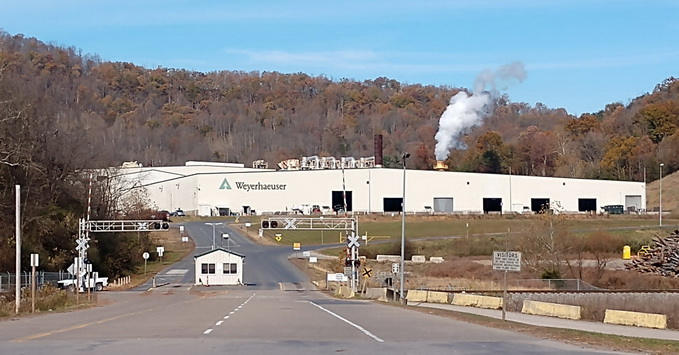

== Churches ==
The Heaters Community Church is located at 3806 Gauley Turnpike, just south of the town of Heaters. It was originally a United Methodist Church, but left that denomination and became an independent church in 2023.

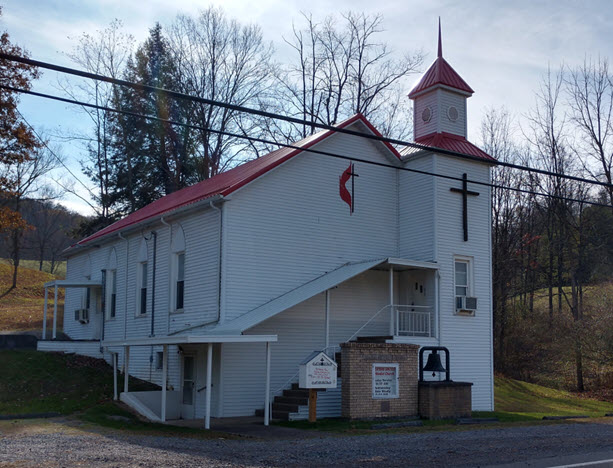
