= Newville, West Virginia =

- Unincorporated community
- Location within West Virginia Location within the United States
- Coordinates: 38°40′43″N 80°35′26″W
- Country: United States
- State: West Virginia
- County: Braxton
- Elevation: 1,139 ft (347 m)
- Time zone: UTC-5 (Eastern (EST))
  - Summer (DST): UTC-4 (EDT)
- Area codes: 304 & 681
- GNIS feature ID: 1544163

Newville is an unincorporated community in Braxton County, West Virginia, United States. Newville is approximately 11 miles (18 km) east of Sutton. The community has no public buildings aside from the Morrison Church, but it had a combined general store, post office, and gas station until the early 1980s. There is some small-scale mountain farming in the community, and many people have kitchen gardens. Newville is 1 mile (1.6 km) from Sutton Lake at Brock Run. Newville is located 5 miles (8.0 km) from Braxton County Airport and 6 miles (9.7 km) from Interstate 79 at the Flatwoods exit.
