= Sleith, West Virginia =

Coordinates: 38.6792624°N 80.9464949°W

Sleith is an extinct town in Braxton County, in the U.S. state of West Virginia.

== History ==
A post office called Sleith was established in 1886, and remained in operation until 1948. The community took its name from nearby Sleith Fork.
