= Corley, Braxton County, West Virginia =

Unincorporated community in West Virginia, United States

Corley, West Virginia
- Unincorporated community
- Location within West Virginia Location within the United States
- Coordinates: 38°44′12″N 80°35′58″W
- Country: United States
- State: West Virginia
- County: Braxton
- Elevation: 860 ft (260 m)
- Time zone: UTC-5 (Eastern (EST))
  - Summer (DST): UTC-4 (EDT)
- Area codes: 304 & 681
- GNIS feature ID: 1554191

Corley is an unincorporated community in Braxton County, West Virginia, United States. Corley is located along Saltlick Creek and County Route 22, 2.9 miles (4.7 km) east-northeast of Flatwoods.

The community was named after a local merchant.
