= Falls Mill, West Virginia =

Unincorporated community in West Virginia, United States

Falls Mill
- Unincorporated community
- Location within the state of West Virginia Falls Mill (the United States)
- Coordinates: 38°46′27″N 80°33′4″W
- Country: United States
- State: West Virginia
- County: Braxton
- Time zone: UTC-5 (Eastern (EST))
  - Summer (DST): UTC-4 (EDT)
- GNIS feature ID: 1554438

Falls Mill is an unincorporated community along U.S. Route 19 and West Virginia Route 4 in Braxton County, West Virginia, United States. The community is named for the nearby falls on the Little Kanawha River, where a mill formerly stood. The falls now mark the upstream limit of Burnsville Lake.
