= Little Birch, West Virginia =

- Unincorporated community
- Location within West Virginia Location within the United States
- Coordinates: 38°34′44″N 80°42′24″W
- Country: United States
- State: West Virginia
- County: Braxton
- Elevation: 1,138 ft (347 m)
- Time zone: UTC-5 (Eastern (EST))
  - Summer (DST): UTC-4 (EDT)
- ZIP code: 26629
- Area codes: 304 & 681
- GNIS feature ID: 1542030

Little Birch is an unincorporated community and linear settlement in Braxton County, West Virginia, United States. The community is 50 miles (80 km) miles northeast of the state capital of Charleston. It is 1.5 miles (2 km) to the east of Route 19, which runs locally from its conjunction with I 79 at the north to Summersville at the south. The nearest neighboring settlement is Sutton, 6 miles (10 km) to the north.

Little Birch is part of the Central Appalachia Empowerment Zone, and takes its name from the Birch River which flows under Old Turnpike Road. It has a post office, with ZIP code 26629, an elementary school, a filling station with store, a village hall, and an automobile sales business. On Old Turnpike Road is Little Birch Baptist Church, affiliated to the Southern Baptist Convention.

Arvil Ernest Harris (1925–1965), born at Little Birch, became mayor of Huntington, West Virginia, and was a political science and social studies professor at Marshall University in Huntington, where he was the first director of the university's graduate program and dean of the graduate school from 1948 to 1964. A hall, built in 1976 at Marshall University, is named after him.
