= Glendon, West Virginia =

Unincorporated community in West Virginia, United States

- Unincorporated community
- Location within West Virginia Location within the United States
- Coordinates: 38°35′28″N 80°53′19″W
- Country: United States
- State: West Virginia
- County: Braxton
- Elevation: 791 ft (241 m)
- Time zone: UTC-5 (Eastern (EST))
  - Summer (DST): UTC-4 (EDT)
- Area codes: 304 & 681
- GNIS feature ID: 1554572

Glendon is an unincorporated community in Braxton County, West Virginia, United States. Glendon is located along West Virginia Route 4 and the Elk River, 10.9 miles (17.5 km) west-southwest of Sutton. Glendon has a post office, which opened on July 31, 1889, and closed on November 5, 1994.
