= Pinch, West Virginia =

- Census-designated place (CDP)
- Location within the state of West Virginia Location within the United States
- Coordinates: 38°24′23″N 81°29′5″W
- Country: United States
- State: West Virginia
- County: Kanawha
- Named for: Pinch Creek

Area
  - Total: 3.6 sq mi (9.3 km^{2})
  - Land: 3.6 sq mi (9.2 km^{2})
  - Water: 0.039 sq mi (0.1 km^{2})
- Elevation: 715 ft (218 m)

Population (2020)
  - Total: 2,914
  - Density: 820/sq mi (320/km^{2})
- Time zone: UTC-5 (Eastern (EST))
  - Summer (DST): UTC-4 (EDT)
- ZIP code: 25156
- Area code: 304
- FIPS code: 54-63772
- GNIS feature ID: 1544859

Pinch is a census-designated place (CDP) in Kanawha County, West Virginia, United States. The population was 2,914 at the 2020 census. It is located about 10 miles (16 km) northeast of Charleston, adjacent to Elkview and roughly 2 miles (3 km) northwest of Big Chimney. The community lies along the Elk River and is surrounded by rolling hills. The community was named after nearby Pinch Creek.

== Geography ==
Location of Pinch in Kanawha County, West Virginia

According to the United States Census Bureau, the CDP has a total area of 3.6 square miles (9.3 km^{2}), of which 3.5 square miles (9.2 km^{2}) is land and 0.04 square miles (0.1 km^{2}) (0.83%) is water.

Pinch is located along the Elk River, approximately 10 miles (16 km) northeast of Charleston, the state capital.

== Demographics ==
=== 2000 census ===
As of the census of 2000, there were 2,811 people, 1,138 households, and 869 families living in the community. The population density was 801.4 people per square mile (309.2/km^{2}). There were 1,194 housing units at an average density of 340.4/sq mi (131.3/km^{2}). The racial makeup of the community was 99.22% White, 0.14% African American, 0.21% Native American, 0.04% Asian, 0.07% from other races, and 0.32% from two or more races. Hispanic or Latino of any race were 0.50% of the population.

There were 1,138 households, out of which 32.5% had children under the age of 18 living with them, 64.7% were married couples living together, 9.2% had a female householder with no husband present, and 23.6% were non-families. 20.9% of all households were made up of individuals, and 7.0% had someone living alone who was 65 years of age or older. The average household size was 2.47 and the average family size was 2.85.

The community's age distribution is 22.1% under the age of 18, 7.3% from 18 to 24, 29.3% from 25 to 44, 28.6% from 45 to 64, and 12.7% who were 65 years of age or older. The median age was 40 years. For every 100 females, there were 93.6 males. For every 100 females age 18 and over, there were 92.5 males.

The median income for a Pinch household is $46,516, and the median income for a family was $55,848. Males had a median income of $40,456 versus $35,203 for females. The per capita income in Pinch is $21,398. About 6.0% of families and 5.9% of the population were below the poverty line, including 5.5% of those under age 18 and 19.9% of those age 65 or over.

=== 2010 census ===
As of the 2010 census, there were 3262 people, 1,150 households, and 850 families living in the community. The population density was 780.5 people per square mile (301.4/km2). There were 1,180 housing units at an average density of 338.0/sq mi (130.5/km2). The racial makeup of the community was 98.9% White, 0.3% African American, 0.2% Native American, 0.1% Asian, 0.1% from other races, and 0.4% from two or more races. Hispanic or Latino of any race were 0.6% of the population.

=== 2020 census ===
As of the 2020 census, there were 2,914 people, 1,120 households, and 840 families living in the community. The population density was 760.0 people per square mile (293.5/km2). There were 1,345 housing units at an average density of 335.0/sq mi (129.5/km2). The racial makeup of the community was 98.7% White, 0.4% African American, 0.2% Native American, 0.1% Asian, 0.1% from other races, and 0.5% from two or more races. Hispanic or Latino of any race were 0.7% of the population.

Historical population
Census	Pop.	Note	%±
2000	2,811		—
2010	3,262		16.0%
2020	2,914		−10.7%

== Education ==
The following public schools serve the Pinch area, along with one private preschool:

Schools serving Pinch, West Virginia
School	Grades	Enrollment	State ranking
Herbert Hoover High School	9–12	783	#17 of 114
Elkview Middle School	6–8	613	#68 of 284
Pinch Elementary School	K–5	321	#96 of 540
Saint Andrew Nursery School (private)	Pre-K	60	N/A

== Public Transportation ==
Kanawha Valley Regional Transportation Authority or KRT provides bus services north through Pinch to Elkview and Clendenin or South through Pinch to Charleston, and from there to several other places throughout the Kanawha Valley.

== Places of interest ==
Pinch is home of Indian Lake, a man-made lake specifically created for fishing. It is stocked with rainbow trout and channel catfish It is also home to what is locally known as the Gazebo, a public theater where performances, pageants, and other community events are held. It has also been holding a town reunion for nearly 70 years. Most recently, in 2016, a public fair was held in the town. Every year, on Christmas Eve, a Christmas parade is held where community members will drive along the Main Street of town at dusk, most notably, the Volunteer Fire Department. A historical resale building on the Main Street of town has a cannon in front of the building. .
