= Little Otter River =

Little Otter River may refer to:

- Little Otter River (Canada)
- Little Otter River (Virginia)

== See also ==
- Little Otter Creek
