= Strange Creek, West Virginia =

Strange Creek
- Unincorporated community
- Location within the state of West Virginia Strange Creek (the United States)
- Coordinates: 38°33′47″N 80°53′52″W
- Country: United States
- State: West Virginia
- County: Braxton
- Time zone: UTC-5 (Eastern (EST))
  - Summer (DST): UTC-4 (EDT)
- GNIS feature ID: 1555727

Strange Creek is an unincorporated community along Route 4 in Braxton County, West Virginia, United States, near the border with Clay County. It lies along the bank of the Elk River. The community takes its name from nearby Strange Creek.
