= Pinch Creek =

Pinch Creek may refer to:

- Pinch Creek (Loutre River), a stream in Missouri
- Pinch Creek (Elk River), a stream in West Virginia
