= McNutt, West Virginia =

- Unincorporated community
- Location within West Virginia Location within the United States
- Coordinates: 38°41′42″N 80°40′09″W
- Country: United States
- State: West Virginia
- County: Braxton
- Elevation: 1,053 ft (321 m)
- Time zone: UTC-5 (Eastern (EST))
  - Summer (DST): UTC-4 (EDT)
- Area codes: 304 & 681
- GNIS feature ID: 1555089

McNutt is an unincorporated community in Braxton County, West Virginia, United States.
