= Cutlips, West Virginia =

Unincorporated community in West Virginia, United States

Cutlips
- Unincorporated community
- Location within the state of West Virginia Cutlips (the United States)
- Coordinates: 38°47′19″N 80°45′15″W
- Country: United States
- State: West Virginia
- County: Braxton
- Elevation: 846 ft (258 m)
- Time zone: UTC-5 (Eastern (EST))
  - Summer (DST): UTC-4 (EDT)
- GNIS ID: 1549650

Cutlips is an unincorporated community in Braxton County, West Virginia, United States. Their Post Office is closed.

Cutlips most likely was named after the local Cutlips family.
