= Elmira, West Virginia =

Unincorporated community in West Virginia, United States

- Unincorporated community
- Location within West Virginia Location within the United States
- Coordinates: 38°39′05″N 80°59′27″W
- Country: United States
- State: West Virginia
- County: Braxton
- Elevation: 997 ft (304 m)
- Time zone: UTC-5 (Eastern (EST))
  - Summer (DST): UTC-4 (EDT)
- Area codes: 304 & 681
- GNIS feature ID: 1554395

Elmira is an unincorporated community in Braxton County, West Virginia, United States. Elmira is 12 miles (19 km) west of Gassaway.
