= Wilsie, West Virginia =

- Unincorporated community
- Location within West Virginia Location within the United States
- Coordinates: 38°41′08″N 80°53′09″W
- Country: United States
- State: West Virginia
- County: Braxton
- Elevation: 932 ft (284 m)
- Time zone: UTC-5 (Eastern (EST))
  - Summer (DST): UTC-4 (EDT)
- Area codes: 304 & 681
- GNIS feature ID: 1555996

Wilsie is an unincorporated community in Braxton County, West Virginia, United States. Wilsie is located along County Route 9, 6.1 miles (9.8 km) west of Gassaway. Wilsie had a post office, which closed on July 23, 2005.
