= Exchange, West Virginia =

Unincorporated community in West Virginia, United States

Exchange
- Unincorporated community
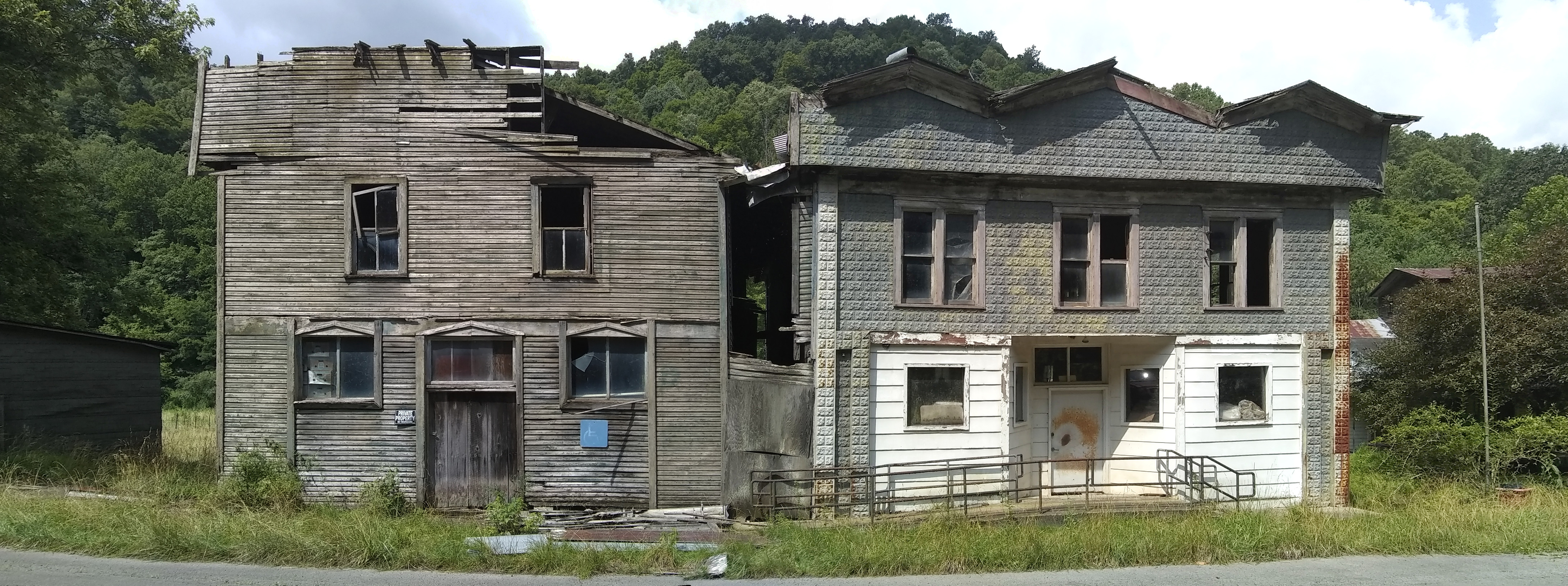

- Location within the state of West Virginia Exchange (the United States)
- Coordinates: 38°46′8″N 80°44′33″W
- Country: United States
- State: West Virginia
- County: Braxton
- Time zone: UTC-5 (Eastern (EST))
  - Summer (DST): UTC-4 (EDT)
- ZIP codes: 26619
- GNIS feature ID: 1538778

Exchange is an unincorporated community and ghost town in Braxton County, West Virginia, United States that has the ZIP code of 26619. The town was a stopping point on the former Coal and Coke Railway.

As of 2019, the outlying areas surrounding Exchange are still populated, but the main street through town is blocked. On August 25, 2023, a fire started in one of the buildings and spread to both sides, resulting in the destruction of the main structures and smaller storage buildings.

== Toponymy ==
An early variant name was Millburn. The present name was suggested on account of ownership of the local mill and other enterprises frequently changing hands.

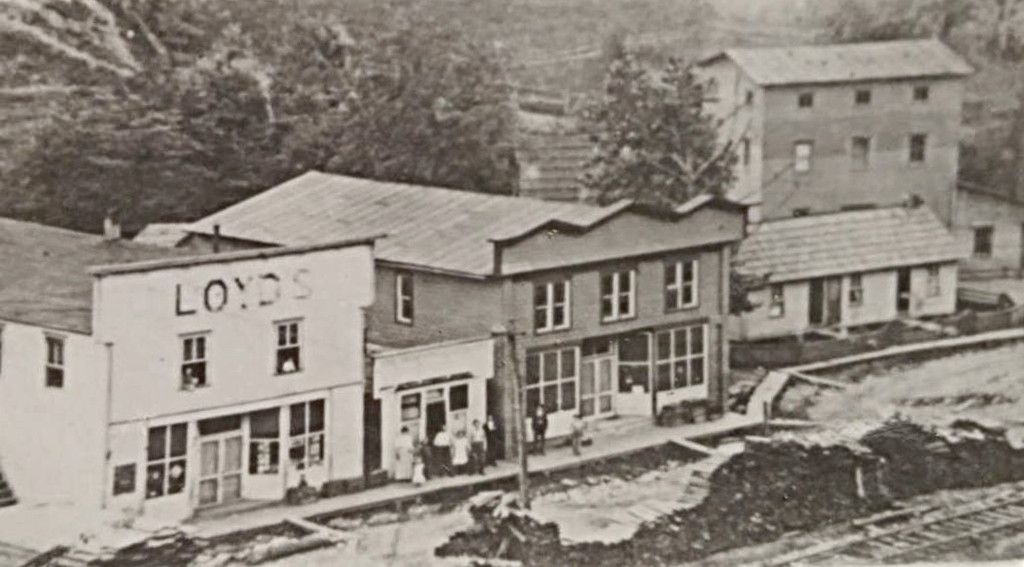
Exchange in the early 1900s.

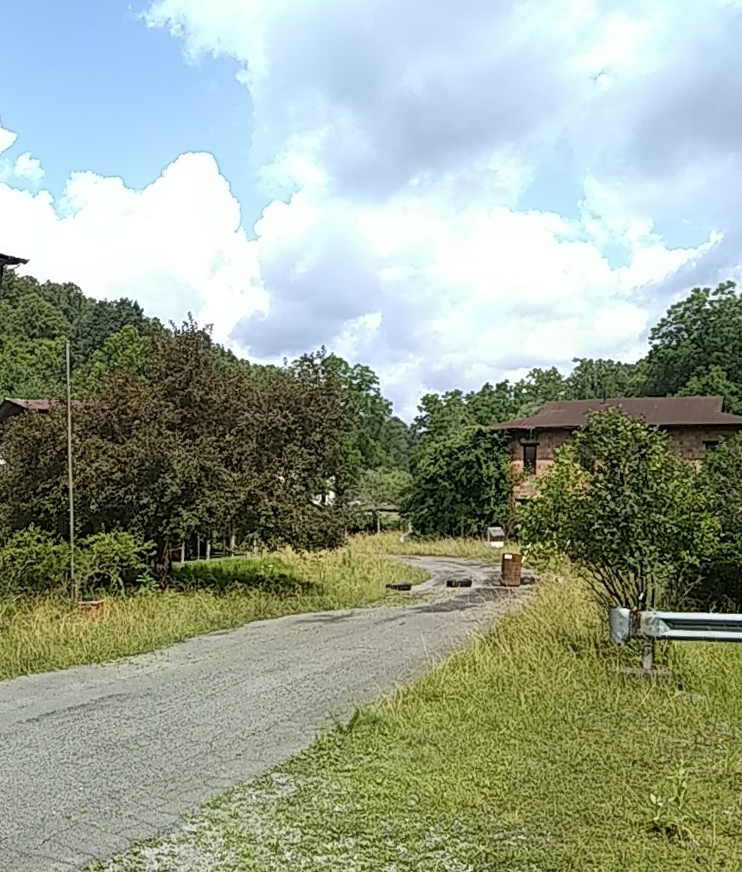
Arnold Lane, the main street through Exchange.
