= Dingy, West Virginia =

Unincorporated community in West Virginia, United States

- Unincorporated community
- Location within West Virginia Location within the United States
- Coordinates: 38°39′6″N 80°56′48″W
- Country: United States
- State: West Virginia
- County: Braxton
- Elevation: 928 ft (283 m)
- Time zone: UTC-5 (Eastern (EST))
  - Summer (DST): UTC-4 (EDT)
- GNIS feature ID: 1554307

Dingy is an unincorporated community in Braxton County, West Virginia, United States. Its post office is closed.

The community was named after James R. Dingy, who was instrumental in securing a post office for the town.
