= Grimes Covered Bridge =

- U.S. National Register of Historic Places
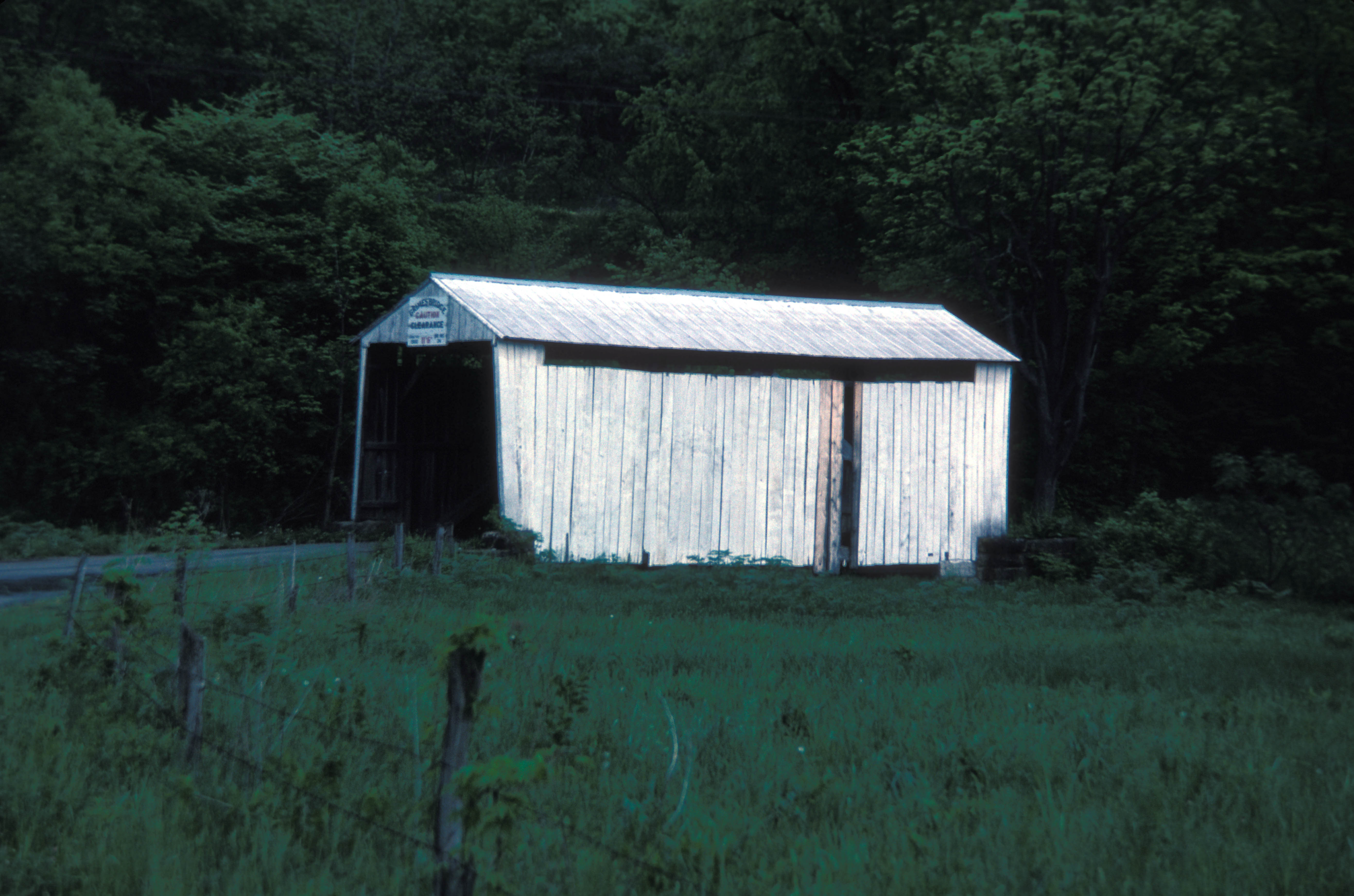
- The bridge in 1970

- Location within Pennsylvania Location within the United States
- Location: Off Pennsylvania Route 221 at the crossing of Ruff Creek, north of Waynesburg, Washington Township, Pennsylvania
- Coordinates: 39°57′16″N 80°9′35″W
- Area: 0.1 acres (0.040 ha)
- Architectural style: Kingpost truss
- MPS: Covered Bridges of Washington and Greene Counties TR
- NRHP reference No.: 79003820
- Added to NRHP: June 22, 1979

The Grimes Covered Bridge was an historic wooden covered bridge that was located in Washington Township in Greene County, Pennsylvania, United States. It was destroyed by fire in 1992.

== History and architectural features ==
This historic structure was a 31.75-foot-long (9.68 m), King post truss bridge with a tin covered gable roof. Built in 1888, it crossed Ruff Creek. In October 1978, it was one of nine historic covered bridges in Greene County. This covered bridge once used the King Post Truss, no arches, and at only 31 feet 9 inches long, it is the shortest covered bridge in Greene County. This covered bridge has died after being destroyed by a fire in November 1992. This covered bridge was 104 years old.

Listed on the National Register of Historic Places in 1979, it was destroyed in a fire in November 1992.
