= Interstate 79 =

Interstate Highway in Pennsylvania and West Virginia

Interstate 79
- I-79 highlighted in red

Route information
- Maintained by WVDOT and PennDOT
- Length: 343.46 mi (552.75 km)
- Existed: 1958–present
- NHS: Entire route

Major junctions
- South end: I-77 in Charleston, WV
- US 33 / US 48 / US 119 near Weston, WV; US 50 near Clarksburg, WV; I-68 near Morgantown, WV; I-70 near Washington, PA; PA Turnpike 576 near Cecil Township, PA; I-376 / US 22 / US 30 near Carnegie, PA; I-279 in Franklin Park, PA; I-76 / Penna Turnpike / US 19 in Cranberry Township, PA; I-80 in Findley Township, PA; I-90 in McKean, PA
- North end: Bayfront Parkway in Erie, PA

Location
- Country: United States
- States: West Virginia, Pennsylvania
- Counties: WV: Kanawha, Roane, Clay, Braxton, Gilmer, Lewis, Harrison, Marion, Monongalia; PA: Greene, Washington, Allegheny, Butler, Lawrence, Mercer, Crawford, Erie

Highway system
- Interstate Highway System; Main; Auxiliary; Suffixed; Business; Future
← WV 78	WV	→ WV 80
← PA 78	PA	→ PA 79
← PA 178	I-179	→ PA 179

Interstate 79 (I-79) is an Interstate Highway in the Eastern United States, designated from I-77 in Charleston, West Virginia, north to Pennsylvania Route 5 (PA 5) and PA 290 in Erie, Pennsylvania. It is a primary thoroughfare through western Pennsylvania and West Virginia and makes up part of an important corridor to Buffalo, New York, and the Canada–United States border. Major metropolitan areas connected by I-79 include Charleston and Morgantown in West Virginia and Greater Pittsburgh and Erie in Pennsylvania.

In West Virginia, I-79 is known as the Jennings Randolph Expressway, named for the West Virginia representative and senator. In the three most northern counties, it is signed as part of the High Tech Corridor. For most of its Pennsylvania stretch, it is known as the Raymond P. Shafer Highway, named for the 39th Pennsylvania governor.

== Route description ==
Lengths
	mi	km
WV	160.52	258.33
PA	182.94	294.41
Total	343.46	552.75

Except at its northern end, I-79 is located on the Allegheny Plateau. Despite the somewhat rugged terrain, the road is relatively flat. Most of the highway is at an elevation of about 1,000 to 1,200 feet (300 to 370 m) above sea level, with some lower areas near both ends and higher areas near Sutton, West Virginia. In the hillier areas, this flatness is achieved by curving around hills, along ridges, and in or partway up river valleys. From Sutton north, I-79 generally parallels the path of U.S. Route 19 (US 19).

=== West Virginia ===
I-79 begins at a modified full Y interchange with I-77 along the northwest bank of the Elk River just northeast of Charleston. (Instead of the expected treatment of I-77 as the primary route at this interchange, the following traffic movements are found: northbound I-77 through traffic curves to the left, while traffic to northbound I-79 exits right; southbound I-77 through traffic curves to the right and merges on the right with traffic from southbound I-79, while traffic to northbound I-79 both exits and merges on the left; southbound I-79 traffic merges on the left with traffic from southbound I-77, while traffic to northbound I-77 both exits and merges on the left.) For its first 67 miles (108 km) to a point just south of Flatwoods, I-79 is located in the watershed of the Elk River, which drains into the Kanawha River. It crosses the Elk River at Frametown and again at Sutton and never strays more than about 15 to 20 miles (24 to 32 km) from it.

=== Pennsylvania ===
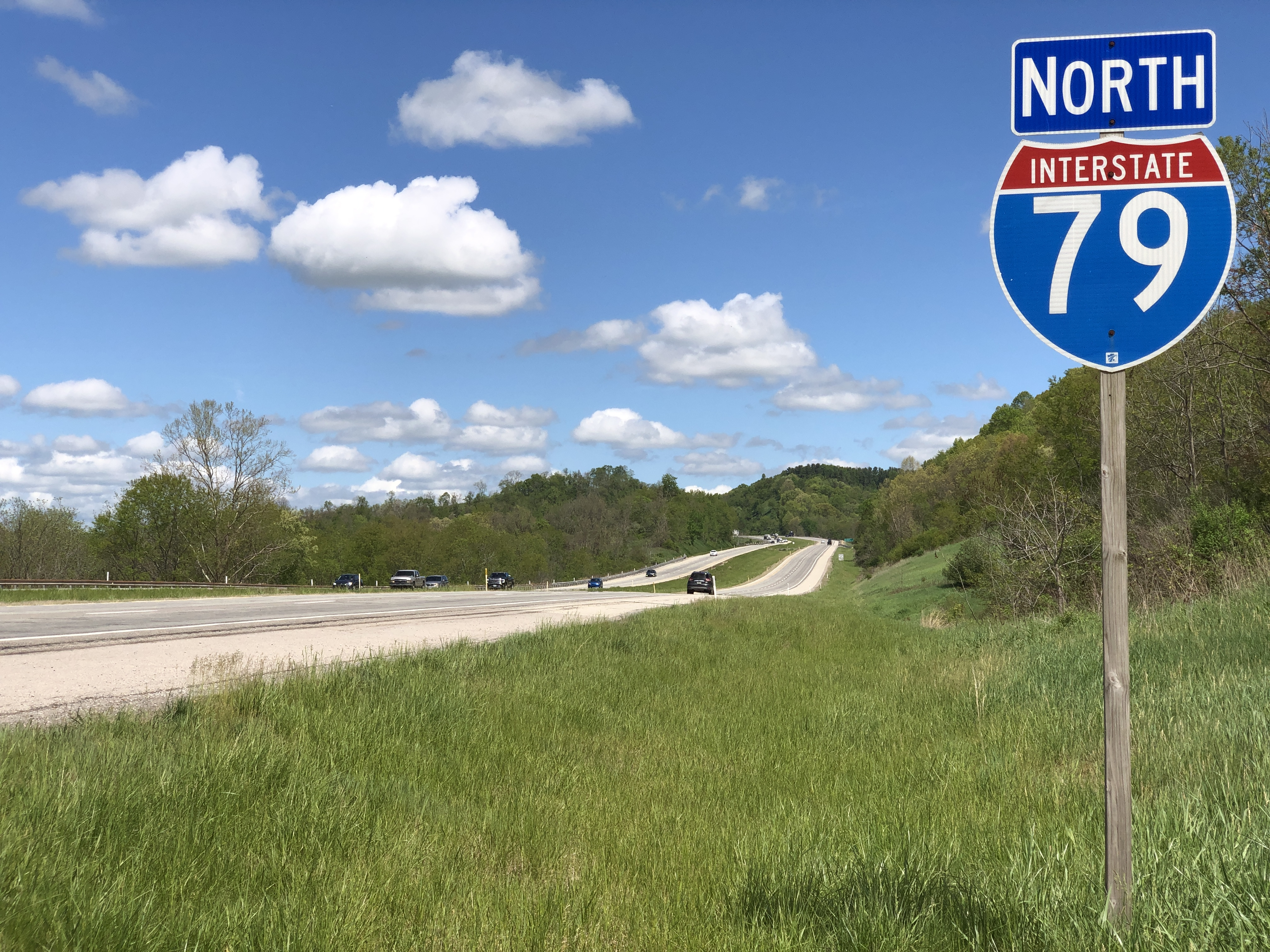
I-79 northbound past exit 7 in Whiteley Township, Pennsylvania

I-79 enters Pennsylvania from Morgantown, West Virginia. South of Washington, it traverses mostly rural Greene County.

Between milemarkers 34 and 38, I-79 overlaps I-70 in the Washington area before heading north toward Pittsburgh.

I-79 is carried over the Ohio River by the Neville Island Bridge, approximately eight miles (13 km) northwest of Pittsburgh.

I-279 merges into I-79 in Franklin Park, just south of Wexford between mile markers 71 and 72.

The freeway into Pittsburgh requires drivers to use I-376 while I-79 completely bypasses the city. Beyond the Pittsburgh area, I-79 traverses more rural areas in Butler, Lawrence, Mercer, Crawford, and Erie counties before arriving at its termination point in Erie. In Erie, I-90 connects from I-79 to Buffalo, New York, and the Canadian border.

Around milemarker 100 on the northbound side are two ghost ramps that were specifically built for the Boy Scouts of America in order to have access to Moraine State Park without having to travel on US 422 for the 1973 and 1977 National Scout Jamborees, which were held at Moraine. The ramps were permanently closed after the 1977 event but remain visible under encroaching vegetation.

== History ==
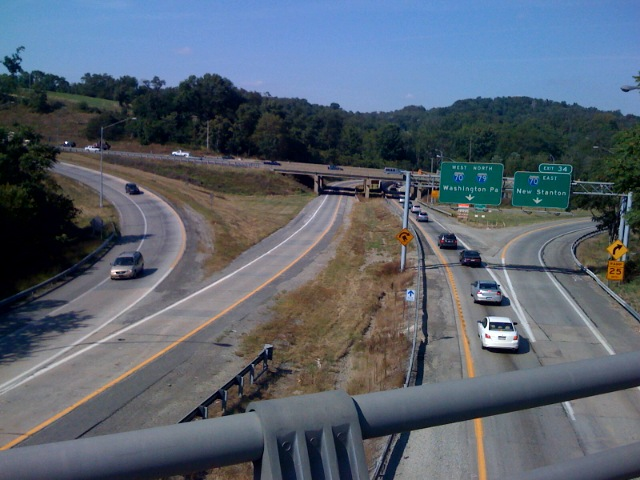
I-79 merging with I-70 in Washington, Pennsylvania

The Pennsylvania General Assembly authorized the Pennsylvania Turnpike Commission to build two extensions in the 1950s. The Northwestern Extension, authorized in 1953, was to stretch from the main Pennsylvania Turnpike north to Erie and would have included a lateral connection between Ohio and New York, what was later built as I-90. The Southwestern Extension, authorized in 1955, was to run south from the main line near Pittsburgh to West Virginia, where it connects with an extension of the West Virginia Turnpike. Except for the section between Washington and Greater Pittsburgh, which was included as part of I-70, the first portion of I-79 to be added to the plans was north from Pittsburgh to Erie, along the US 19 corridor.

Interstate 179
- Location: Erie
- Existed: November 12, 1958–1968

Interstate 279
- Location: Pittsburgh
- Length: 13.32 mi (21.44 km)
- Existed: September 16, 1989–present

In September 1955, two short urban portions were designated:

- I-179: A spur from I-90 north to Erie, currently absorbed into I-79.
- I-279: A western bypass of Pittsburgh, connecting I-70 with I-80S (now I-76); it and I-79 later swapped designations.

The number 79 was assigned in 1958, and an extension south along I-70 to Washington and beyond to Charleston was approved on October 18, 1961. This extension also paralleled US 19 to near Sutton, where it turned westerly to reach Charleston. (The part of US 19 from Sutton south to I-77 at Beckley, West Virginia, has since been four-laned as Corridor L of the Appalachian Development Highway System.)

On December 21, 1967, the first section of I-79 in West Virginia, between exits 125 (Saltwell Road) and 132 (South Fairmont), opened to traffic. This five-mile (8.0 km) section bypassed part of West Virginia Route 73 (WV 73) between Bridgeport and Fairmont. Another five miles (8.0 km) opened in July 1968, extending the highway on a bypass of downtown Fairmont to exit 137 (East Park Avenue). It was further extended 9.5 miles (15.3 km) toward Morgantown on October 15, 1970, bypassing more of WV 73 to exit 146 (Goshen Road) south of that city.

On June 29, 1970, the swap of I-79 and I-279 was approved. At the same time, I-76 was extended west from Downtown Pittsburgh over former I-79 to the new location of I-79 west of Pittsburgh, so I-279 only ran north from Downtown Pittsburgh. On December 3, 1971, I-76 was rerouted to bypass Pittsburgh, and I-279 was extended to I-79 utilizing the former section of I-76. The changes took effect on October 2, 1972.

On June 29, 1973, I-79 was extended from West Virginia exit 146 to exit 148 (I-68), where, at one point, traffic was forced onto the newly opened west end of Corridor E (now I-68) to exit 1. A further extension of six miles (9.7 km), including the Uffington Bridge over the Monongahela River southwest of Morgantown, was opened on August 30, 1973, leading north to exit 155 (Star City). This completed I-79 from north of Bridgeport to north of Morgantown.

To the south of Bridgeport, the first two sections were both opened on December 22, 1971. One of these ran 10 miles (16 km) from exit 51 (Frametown) to exit 62 (Sutton), and the other from exit 105 (Jane Lew) to exit 115 (Nutter Fort). On September 19, 1973, another 7.5-mile (12.1 km) stretch was opened, from exit 105 (Jane Lew) south to exit 99 (Weston).

In 1973, significant portions of the Interstate were completed. I-79 opened from exit 62 to exit 99. Another 23.9 miles (38.5 km), from exit 67 (Flatwoods) north to exit 91 (Roanoke), opened on November 28, 1973, along with the section from exit 115 north to exit 117 (Anmoore), completing the route between Frametown and Morgantown except in the Bridgeport area.

A 5.5-mile (8.9 km) extension from exit 51 south to exit 46 (Servia) opened on February 1, 1974, and County Route 11 to WV 4 near Duck was widened to handle the increased load. On the same day, two lanes opened from exit 155 (Osage) north to the state line.

On October 16, 1974, two pieces of I-79 were opened: the other two lanes of the 6.6 miles (10.6 km) from exit 155 to the state line and 7.1 miles (11.4 km) between exits 117 (Anmoore) and 125 (north of Bridgeport). On the same day, the eastern end of Corridor D and the western end of Corridor E, both connecting to I-79 (at exits 119 and 148), were opened. This completed I-79 in West Virginia north of exit 46 (Servia); it was extended south to exit 25 (Amma) in late November and to US 119 north of Clendenin (exit 19) on November 13, 1975. It was opened from exit 19 to exit 9 (Elkview) on November 18, 1977, and finally completed to I-77 in 1979.

On July 25, 1975, I-79 was opened between exits 1 and 14 in Pennsylvania. The last piece of I-79 between West Virginia and Erie—the Neville Island Bridge over the Ohio River—opened on September 3, 1976. In 1984, the route was extended about one mile (1.6 km) further to the north, with the opening of a new segment between US 20 and PA 5 in Erie.

Milepost based exit numbers were introduced to the Pennsylvania portion in 2001.

In 2000, construction began on the interchange with the Pennsylvania Turnpike in Cranberry. It was opened to traffic in 2004.

In late 2008, the missing ramps of the I-79/I-376 interchange (PA 60 was designated as the route for southbound traffic seeking to go to Pittsburgh International Airport and for airport traffic seeking to go northbound on I-79) were completed.

In June 2009, I-376 was extended west and north of Downtown Pittsburgh, and I-279 was truncated back to the section only running from Downtown Pittsburgh north to I-79.

During 2010, PennDOT undertook a $20.8 million improvement of I-79, Neville Island Bridge as well as other intersections.

On December 22, 2010, WVDOT competed construction on a new interchange to serve Route 173.

In 2010, construction began on improvements to exit 88. This was competed in December 2012.

Construction began in 2011 on improvements to the interchange with Interstate 70 in South Strabane. They were competed in Summer 2013.

In 2020, a new safety system went into effect to better warn motorists about the sharp curvature between the PA 60 interchange and PA 51 interchange.

Construction of the PA 576 interchange was completed on June 24, 2022. This involved construction of a new underpass.

In 2025, WVDOT expects to compete a six-lane widening between Harrison County and the Pennsylvania state line.

== Exit list ==
State	County	Location	mi	km	Old exit	New exit	Destinations	Notes
West Virginia	Kanawha	Charleston	0.000	0.000		—	I-77 to I-64 – Parkersburg, Charleston	Southern terminus; I-77 exit 104; modified full Y interchange
West Virginia	Kanawha	Charleston	1.845	2.969		1	US 119 – Mink Shoals	Access to Coonskin Park
West Virginia	Kanawha	Charleston	5.047	8.122		5	US 119 (WV 114) – Big Chimney	Northern terminus of WV 114
West Virginia	Kanawha	Pinch	9.469	15.239		9	CR 43 (Frame Road) – Elkview	
West Virginia	Kanawha	Clendenin	19.091	30.724		19	US 119 (CR 53) – Clendenin	
West Virginia	Roane	Amma	25.281	40.686		25	CR 29 – Amma	
West Virginia	Roane		33.741	54.301		34	WV 36 – Wallback, Clay	
West Virginia	Clay		39.899	64.211		40	WV 16 – Big Otter	
West Virginia	Braxton		46.099	74.189		46	CR 11 (Servia Road)	
West Virginia	Braxton	Frametown	51.569	82.992		51	WV 4 – Frametown	
West Virginia	Braxton		57.607	92.709		57	US 19 south – Beckley	Southern end of US 19 concurrency; access to New River Gorge
West Virginia	Braxton	Sutton	61.465	98.918		62	WV 4 – Sutton, Gassaway	
West Virginia	Braxton	Flatwoods	66.965	107.770		67	US 19 north (WV 4) / WV 15 – Flatwoods	Northern end of US 19 concurrency; access to Sutton Lake
West Virginia	Braxton	Burnsville	78.909	126.992		79	WV 5 – Burnsville, Glenville	Access to Glenville State College and Burnsville Dam
West Virginia	Gilmer	No major junctions						
West Virginia	Lewis		90.988	146.431		91	US 19 – Stonewall Resort, Roanoke	Access to Stonewall Jackson Lake State Park
West Virginia	Lewis	Weston	95.928	154.381		96	CR 30 – South Weston	Access to Stonewall Jackson Lake and Jackson's Mill
West Virginia	Lewis	Weston	98.608	158.694		99	US 33 / US 48 / US 119 – Weston, Buckhannon	Access to West Virginia Wesleyan College and Davis and Elkins College
West Virginia	Lewis	Jane Lew	105.038	169.042		105	CR 7 – Jane Lew	Access to Jackson's Mill
West Virginia	Harrison	Lost Creek	109.688– 110.595	176.526– 177.985		110	WV 270 – Lost Creek	Eastern terminus of WV 270
West Virginia	Harrison	Stonewood	115.75	186.28		115	WV 20 – Stonewood, Nutter Fort	Access to Alderson Broaddus University
West Virginia	Harrison	Clarksburg	118.13	190.11		117	WV 58 – Anmoore	
West Virginia	Harrison	Clarksburg	119.63	192.53		119	US 50 (Corridor D) – Clarksburg, Bridgeport	Access to Salem International University
West Virginia	Harrison	Bridgeport	121.7	195.9		121	CR 24 (Meadowbrook Road)	
West Virginia	Harrison	Bridgeport	124.34	200.11		124	WV 279 to US 50 east	Access to North Central West Virginia Airport, Tygart Lake State Park, and United Hospital Center
West Virginia	Harrison		125.36	201.75		125	WV 131 (Saltwell Road) – Shinnston	
West Virginia	Marion	White Hall	132.086	212.572		132	US 250 – Fairmont, White Hall	
West Virginia	Marion	Fairmont	133.356	214.616		133	CR 641 (Kingmont Road)	
West Virginia	Marion	Fairmont	134.926	217.142		135	CR 64 (Pleasant Valley Road)	
West Virginia	Marion	Fairmont	136.006	218.880		136	WV 273 – Downtown Fairmont	Southern terminus of WV 273; exit fully opened on December 22, 2010.
West Virginia	Marion	Fairmont	136.660	219.933		137	WV 310 (East Park Avenue)	Access to Valley Falls State Park
West Virginia	Marion	Fairmont	138.79	223.36		139	CR 33 (Pricketts Creek Road) – East Fairmont	Access to Prickett's Fort State Park
West Virginia	Monongalia		145.62	234.35		146	CR 77 (Goshen Road)	
West Virginia	Monongalia	Morgantown	148.766	239.416		148	I-68 east – Cumberland	Western terminus of I-68; access to Mountaineer Field and Tygart Lake State Park
West Virginia	Monongalia		152.502	245.428		152	US 19 – Westover, Morgantown	Access to Granville
West Virginia	Monongalia		153.4	246.9		153	CR 467 (University Town Centre Drive)	Access to Monongalia County Ballpark
West Virginia	Monongalia		154.836	249.184		155	WV 7 – West Virginia University	Access to Star City, Osage, and Mountaineer Field
Mason–Dixon line			160.52 0.0	258.33 0.0	West Virginia–Pennsylvania state line			
Pennsylvania	Greene	Perry Township	0.8	1.3	1	1	To US 19 – Mount Morris	
Pennsylvania	Greene	Whiteley Township	6.8	10.9	2	7	Kirby, Garards Fort	
Pennsylvania	Greene	Franklin Township	14.0	22.5	3	14	PA 21 – Masontown, Waynesburg	Access to Waynesburg University
Pennsylvania	Greene	Washington Township	19.4	31.2	4	19	US 19 / PA 221 – Ruff Creek, Jefferson	
Pennsylvania	Washington	West Bethlehem Township	23.4	37.7	5	23	Marianna, Prosperity	
Pennsylvania	Washington	Amwell Township	30.6	49.2	6	30	US 19 – Amity, Lone Pine	
Pennsylvania	Washington	Amwell Township	32.9	52.9	7	33	US 40 – Laboratory	
Pennsylvania	Washington	South Strabane Township	34.4	55.4	—	34 (NB); 21 (SB)	I-70 east – New Stanton	Southern end of I-70 concurrency
Pennsylvania	Washington	South Strabane Township	35.4	57.0	8	20	PA 136 (Beau Street)	Access to Washington & Jefferson College
Pennsylvania	Washington	South Strabane Township	36.4	58.6	7	19	US 19 (Murtland Avenue)	Diverging diamond interchange
Pennsylvania	Washington	South Strabane Township	37.9	61.0	—	18 (NB); 38 (SB)	I-70 west – Wheeling	Northern end of I-70 concurrency
Pennsylvania	Washington	South Strabane Township	40.3	64.9	8A	40	Meadow Lands	Was Northbound exit and Southbound entrance until 2013
Pennsylvania	Washington	South Strabane Township	41.1	66.1	8	41	Race Track Road	Access to Hollywood Casino at The Meadows
Pennsylvania	Washington	North Strabane Township	43.4	69.8	9	43	PA 519 – Eighty Four, Houston	
Pennsylvania	Washington	North Strabane Township	45.5	73.2	10	45	To PA 980 – Canonsburg	
Pennsylvania	Washington	Cecil Township	48.2	77.6	10A	48	Southpointe, Hendersonville	Access to Pennsylvania Western University, California's Southpointe Campus and to the National Cemetery of the Alleghenies
Pennsylvania	Washington	Cecil Township			—	49	PA Turnpike 576 west – Pittsburgh International Airport	Northbound exit and southbound entrance; exit 19 on PA 576
Pennsylvania	Washington	Cecil Township	50.2	80.8	—	49	PA Turnpike 576 to Morganza Road – Pittsburgh International Airport	Southbound exit and northbound entrance; PA 576 east not signed; exit 18 on PA 576
Pennsylvania	Allegheny	Bridgeville	54.6	87.9	11	54	PA 50 – Bridgeville	
Pennsylvania	Allegheny	South Fayette Township	55.2	88.8	12	55	PA 50 – Heidelberg, Collier Township	Formerly designated as "Heidelberg / Kirwan Heights"
Pennsylvania	Allegheny	Scott Township	57.4	92.4	13	57	Carnegie	
Pennsylvania	Allegheny	Pennsbury Village	59.3	95.4	14	59	I-376 (US 22 / US 30) – Pittsburgh, Pittsburgh International Airport	I-376 exit 59; signed as exits 59A (east) and 59B (west)
Pennsylvania	Allegheny	Robinson Township	60.4	97.2	16	60	PA 60 – Crafton, Moon Run	Signed as exits 60A (south) and 60B (north) southbound
Pennsylvania	Allegheny	Coraopolis	64.1	103.2	17	64	PA 51 – Coraopolis, McKees Rocks	No southbound exit
Pennsylvania	Allegheny	Ohio River			Neville Island Bridge			
Pennsylvania	Allegheny	Neville Township	64.8	104.3	18	65	Yellow Belt to PA 51 – Neville Island	Southern terminus of Yellow Belt concurrency
Pennsylvania	Allegheny	Ohio River			Neville Island Bridge			
Pennsylvania	Allegheny	Glenfield	66.5	107.0	19	66	PA 65 – Emsworth, Sewickley	
Pennsylvania	Allegheny	Ohio Township	68.0	109.4	20	68	Yellow Belt (Mount Nebo Road)	Northern terminus of Yellow Belt concurrency
Pennsylvania	Allegheny	Franklin Park	72.1	116.0	21	72	I-279 south – Pittsburgh	Southbound exit and northbound entrance; northern terminus of I-279
Pennsylvania	Allegheny	Franklin Park	73.3	118.0	22	73	PA 910 east / Orange Belt – Wexford	Western terminus of PA 910
Pennsylvania	Allegheny	Marshall Township	75.7	121.8	23	75	Red Belt to US 19 south – Warrendale	Northbound exit and southbound entrance
Pennsylvania	Allegheny	Marshall Township	75.9	122.1	25	76	US 19 north – Cranberry	Northbound left exit and southbound entrance
Pennsylvania	Butler	Cranberry Township	77.2	124.2	—	77	I-76 / Penna Turnpike – Harrisburg, Youngstown OH	I-76 / Penna Turnpike exit 28 (Cranberry)
Pennsylvania	Butler	Cranberry Township	78.7	126.7	25	78	PA 228 – Seven Fields, Mars, Cranberry	
Pennsylvania	Butler	Jackson Township	83.1	133.7	26	83	PA 528 – Evans City	Northbound exit and southbound entrance
Pennsylvania	Butler	Jackson Township	85.5	137.6	26	85	To PA 528 (US 19)	Southbound exit and northbound entrance
Pennsylvania	Butler	Jackson Township	87.3	140.5	27	87	PA 68 – Zelienople	Northbound exit and southbound entrance
Pennsylvania	Butler	Jackson Township	88.7	142.7	27	88	To US 19 / PA 68 – Zelienople	Signed as Little Creek Road northbound; promoted as access to Seneca Valley School District
Pennsylvania	Butler	Muddy Creek Township	95.8	154.2	28	96	PA 488 – Portersville, Prospect	
Pennsylvania	Butler	Muddy Creek Township	99.6	160.3	29	99	US 422 – New Castle, Butler	Access to Moraine State Park and McConnells Mill State Park
Pennsylvania	Butler	Worth Township	105.4	169.6	30	105	PA 108 – Slippery Rock	Access to Slippery Rock University of Pennsylvania; interchange partially located in Lawrence County
Pennsylvania	Lawrence	No major junctions						
Pennsylvania	Mercer	Springfield Township	113.7	183.0	31	113	PA 208 / PA 258 – Grove City	Access to Grove City College and Westminster College
Pennsylvania	Mercer	Findley Township	116.5	187.5	—	116	I-80 – Clarion, Sharon	Signed as exits 116A (east) and 116B (west); I-80 exit 19
Pennsylvania	Mercer	Jackson Township	121.1	194.9	33	121	US 62 – Mercer, Franklin	
Pennsylvania	Mercer	New Vernon Township	130.6	210.2	34	130	PA 358 – Greenville, Sandy Lake	Access to Thiel College
Pennsylvania	Crawford	Greenwood Township	141.5	227.7	35	141	PA 285 – Geneva, Cochranton	
Pennsylvania	Crawford	Vernon Township	147.4	237.2	36	147	US 6 / US 19 / US 322 – Meadville, Conneaut Lake	Signed as exits 147A (north/east) and 147B (south/west); access to Conneaut Lake Park and Allegheny College, to PA 102
Pennsylvania	Crawford	Hayfield Township	153.9	247.7	37	154	PA 198 – Conneautville, Saegertown	
Pennsylvania	Erie	Washington Township	166.5	268.0	38	166	US 6N – Albion, Edinboro	Access to Pennsylvania Western University, Edinboro
Pennsylvania	Erie	McKean Township	174.7	281.2	39	174	McKean	
Pennsylvania	Erie	McKean Township	178.6	287.4	—	178	I-90 – Buffalo, Cleveland	Signed as exits 178A (east) and 178B (west); I-90 exits 22; former southern terminus of I-179
Pennsylvania	Erie	Millcreek Township	180.5	290.5	41	180	To US 19 – Kearsarge	Access to Millcreek Mall and PA 99
Pennsylvania	Erie	Erie	182.7	294.0	43	182	US 20 (26th Street)	Access to Erie International Airport
Pennsylvania	Erie	Erie	183.6	295.5	44	183	PA 5 / PA 290 east (12th Street)	Northbound exit and southbound entrance; signed as exits 183A (east) and 183B (west); access to Presque Isle State Park, Waldameer & Water World, and Gannon University; western terminus of PA 290
Pennsylvania	Erie	Erie	183.8	295.8	—	—	Bayfront Parkway / Lincoln Avenue	Northern terminus; at-grade intersection; former northern terminus of I-179
1.000 mi = 1.609 km; 1.000 km = 0.621 mi: Concurrency terminus; Incomplete access

== Auxiliary routes ==
- I-179 was a spur from I-90 north to Erie, now absorbed into I-79
- I-279 heads southeast from I-79 in Pittsburgh's northern suburbs to I-376 in Downtown Pittsburgh.
- I-579 heads south from I-279 in Pittsburgh's North Side to the Liberty Bridge and the Boulevard of the Allies just east of Downtown Pittsburgh.
