= Washington Township, Greene County, Pennsylvania =

Township in Pennsylvania, US

Coordinates: 39°58′00″N 80°12′14″W

- Township
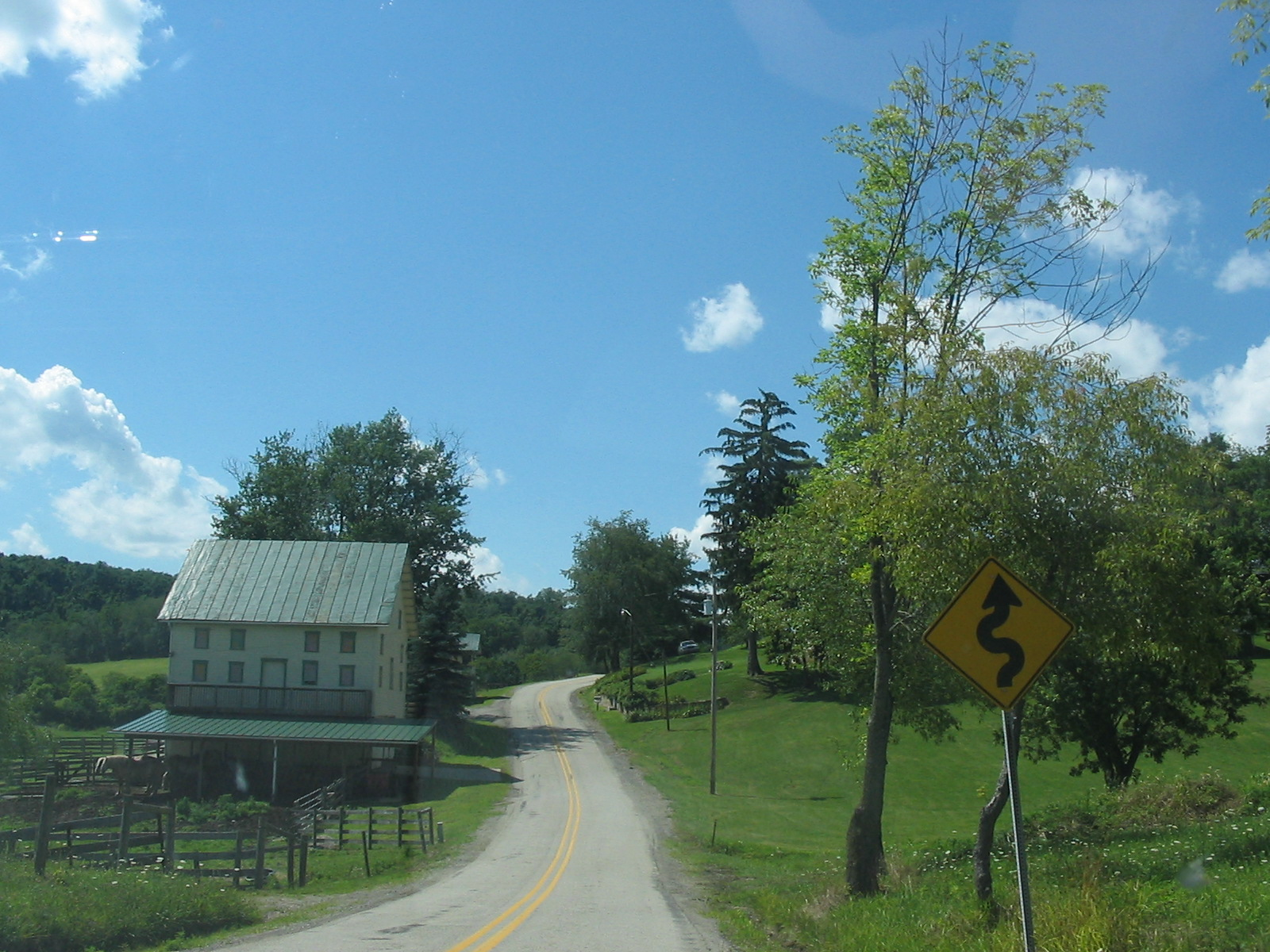
- Pennsylvania Route 221 as it passes through Washington Township

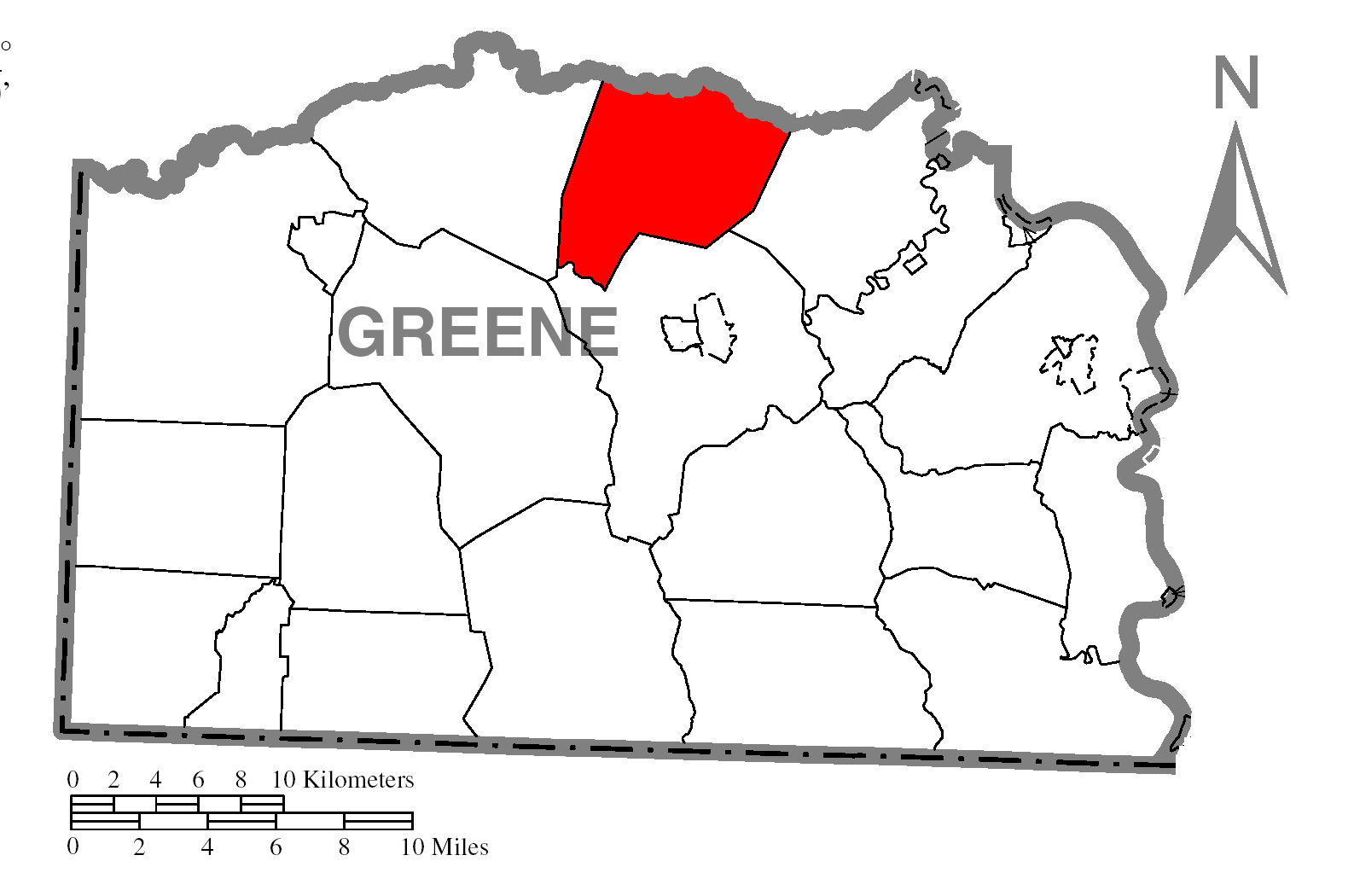
- Location of Washington Township in Greene County

- Location of Greene County in Pennsylvania
- Country: United States
- State: Pennsylvania
- County: Greene

Area
  - Total: 27.16 sq mi (70.35 km^{2})
  - Land: 27.15 sq mi (70.31 km^{2})
  - Water: 0.019 sq mi (0.05 km^{2})

Population (2020)
  - Total: 930 ▼
  - Estimate (2023): 893
  - Density: 38.6/sq mi (14.89/km^{2})
- Time zone: UTC-4 (EST)
  - Summer (DST): UTC-5 (EDT)
- Area code: 724
- FIPS code: 42-059-81248

Washington Township is a township that is located in Greene County, Pennsylvania, United States. The population was 930 at the time of the 2020 census.

== History ==
The Grimes Covered Bridge and McClelland-Grimes Farm are listed on the National Register of Historic Places.

== Geography ==
The township is located in north-central Greene County and is bordered to the north by Washington County. According to the United States Census Bureau, the township has a total area of 27.2 square miles (70.4 km^{2}), of which 0.02 square miles (0.05 km^{2}), or 0.06%, are water.

Interstate 79 passes through the township, with access from Exit 19 at Ruff Creek. Besides Ruff Creek, unincorporated communities in the township include Sycamore and part of Swarts.

== Demographics ==
Historical population
Census	Pop.	Note	%±
2000	1,106		—
2010	1,098		−0.7%
2020	930		−15.3%
2025 (est.)	894		−3.9%
U.S. Decennial Census

As of the census of 2000, there were 1,106 people, 409 households, and 328 families residing in the township.

The population density was 41.0 inhabitants per square mile (15.8/km^{2}). There were 435 housing units at an average density of 16.1/sq mi (6.2/km^{2}).

The racial makeup of the township was 98.73% White, 0.18% African American, 0.09% Native American, 0.09% Asian, and 0.90% from two or more races. Hispanic or Latino of any race were 0.09% of the population.

There were 409 households, out of which 36.4% had children who were under the age of eighteen living with them; 68.2% were married couples living together, 7.8% had a female householder with no husband present, and 19.8% were non-families. Of all of the households that were documented, 16.9% were made up of individuals, and 7.8% had someone living alone who was sixty-five years of age or older.

The average household size was 2.70 and the average family size was 3.05.

Within the township, the population was spread out, with 25.0% of residents who were under the age of 18, 7.1% from 18 to 24, 27.6% from 25 to 44, 29.2% from 45 to 64, and 11.1% who were 65 years of age or older. The median age was 40 years.

For every 100 females, there were 94.0 males. For every 100 females age 18 and over, there were 100.7 males.

The median income for a household in the township was $39,432, and the median income for a family was $43,889. Males had a median income of $33,036 compared with that of $21,435 for females.

The per capita income for the township was $17,207.

Approximately 7.5% of families and 8.0% of the population were living below the poverty line, including 9.2% of those who were under the age of eighteen and 2.6% of those who were aged sixty-five or older.
