= Servia, West Virginia =

- Unincorporated community
- Location within West Virginia Location within the United States
- Coordinates: 38°37′13″N 80°57′26″W
- Country: United States
- State: West Virginia
- County: Braxton
- Elevation: 892 ft (272 m)
- Time zone: UTC-5 (Eastern (EST))
  - Summer (DST): UTC-4 (EDT)
- Area codes: 304 & 681
- GNIS feature ID: 1546579

Servia is an unincorporated community in Braxton County, West Virginia, United States. Servia is located on County Route 11 and Duck Creek near Interstate 79, 13.7 miles (22.0 km) west-southwest of Sutton.
