= Findley Township, Mercer County, Pennsylvania =

Township in Pennsylvania, US

Coordinates: 41°12′30″N 80°7′23″W

- Township
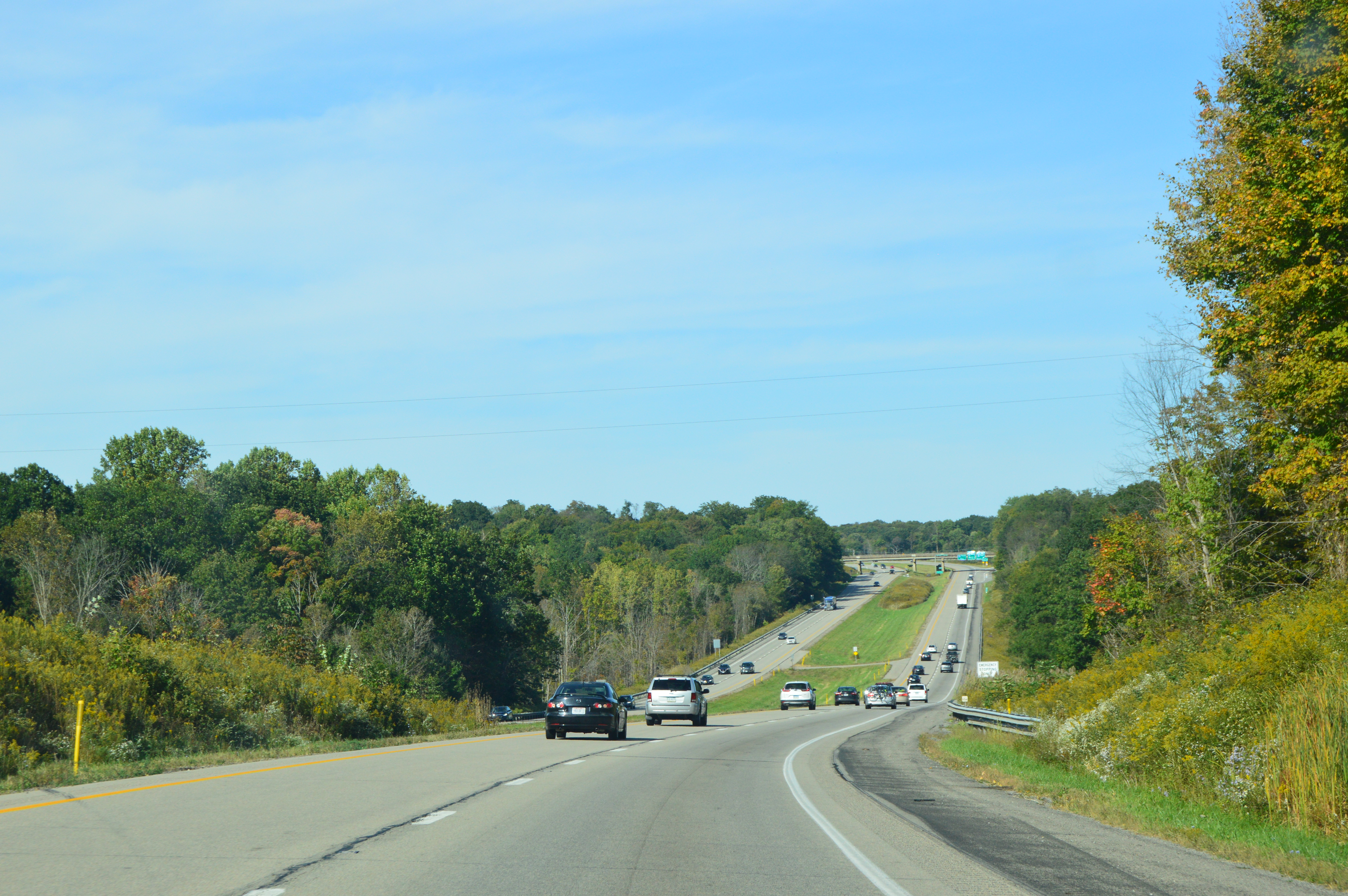
- Interstate 79 just south of its interchange with Interstate 80

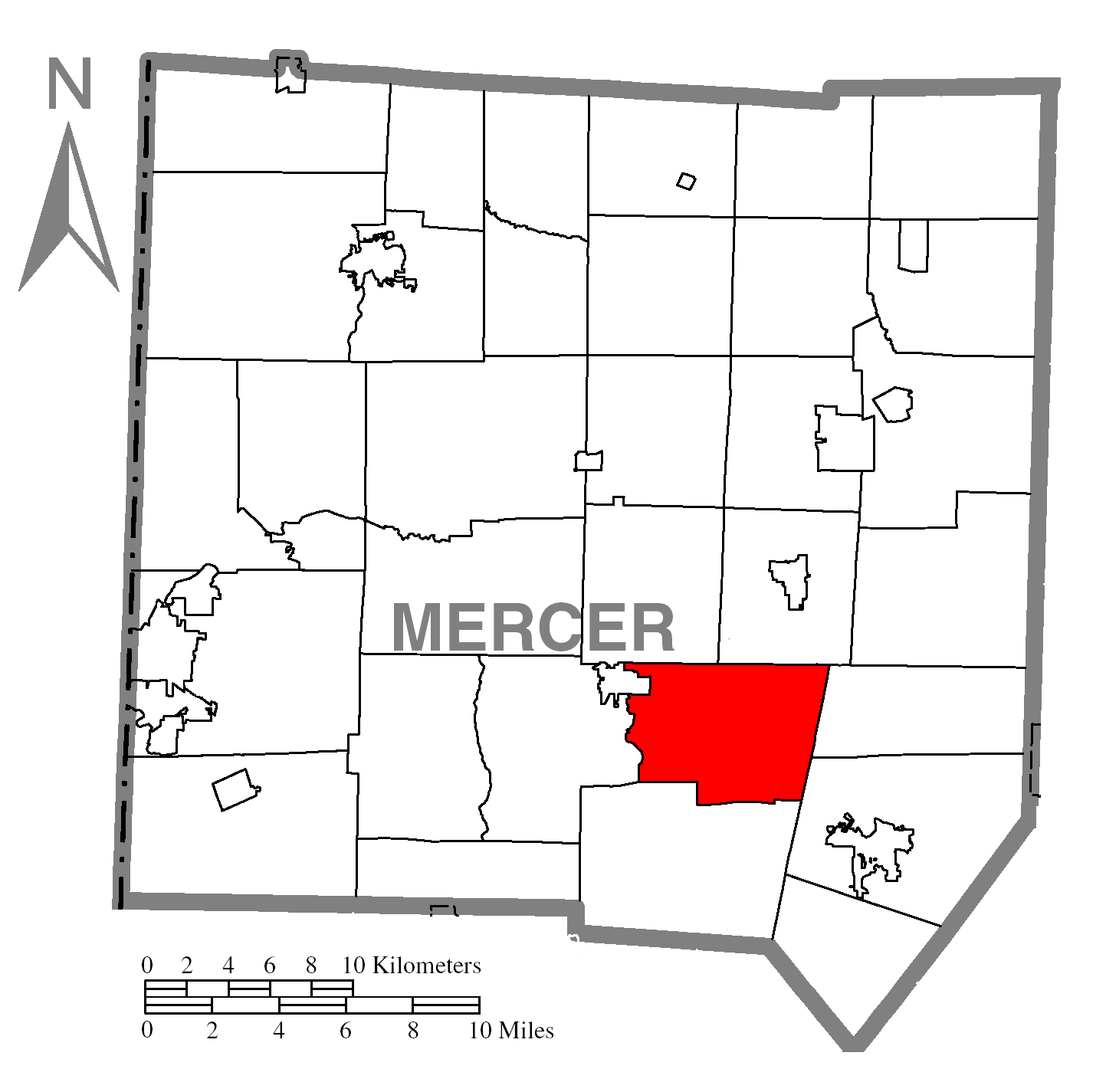
- Location of Findley Township in Mercer County

- Location of Mercer County in Pennsylvania
- Country: United States
- State: Pennsylvania
- County: Mercer

Area
  - Total: 21.25 sq mi (55.05 km^{2})
  - Land: 21.22 sq mi (54.96 km^{2})
  - Water: 0.039 sq mi (0.10 km^{2})

Population (2020)
  - Total: 2,847
  - Estimate (2023): 2,650
  - Density: 135/sq mi (52.3/km^{2})
- Time zone: UTC-4 (EST)
  - Summer (DST): UTC-5 (EDT)
- Area code: 724
- FIPS code: 42-085-25912

Historical population
Census	Pop.	Note	%±
2000	2,305		—
2010	2,910		26.2%
2020	2,847		−2.2%
2023 (est.)	2,650		−6.9%
U.S. Decennial Census

Findley Township is a township in Mercer County, Pennsylvania, United States. The population was 2,868 at the 2020 census, a decline from the figure of 2,910 in 2010.

== History ==
Findley Township is named for William Findley, a Pennsylvania congressman.

== Geography ==
According to the United States Census Bureau, the township has a total area of 21.2 square miles (55 km^{2}), of which 21.1 square miles (55 km^{2}) is land and 0.1 square miles (0.26 km^{2}) (0.24%) is water.

== Demographics ==
As of the census of 2000, there were 2,305 people, 542 households, and 407 families residing in the township. The population density was 109.1 inhabitants per square mile (42.1/km^{2}). There were 564 housing units at an average density of 26.7 per square mile (10.3/km^{2}). The racial makeup of the township was 84.56% White, 14.79% African American, 0.13% Native American, 0.04% Asian, 0.04% Pacific Islander, 0.09% from other races, and 0.35% from two or more races. Hispanic or Latino of any race were 3.99% of the population.

There were 542 households, out of which 33.2% had children under the age of 18 living with them, 65.7% were married couples living together, 5.5% had a female householder with no husband present, and 24.9% were non-families. 20.1% of all households were made up of individuals, and 9.6% had someone living alone who was 65 years of age or older. The average household size was 2.56 and the average family size was 2.93.

In the township the population was spread out, with 14.3% under the age of 18, 6.6% from 18 to 24, 41.5% from 25 to 44, 28.6% from 45 to 64, and 9.0% who were 65 years of age or older. The median age was 40 years. For every 100 females there were 238.5 males. For every 100 females age 18 and over, there were 279.8 males.

The median income for a household in the township was $42,153, and the median income for a family was $46,250. Males had a median income of $30,495 versus $19,471 for females. The per capita income for the township was $11,052. About 4.4% of families and 6.6% of the population were below the poverty line, including 6.4% of those under age 18 and 6.1% of those age 65 or over.
