= McClelland–Grimes Farm =

- U.S. National Register of Historic Places
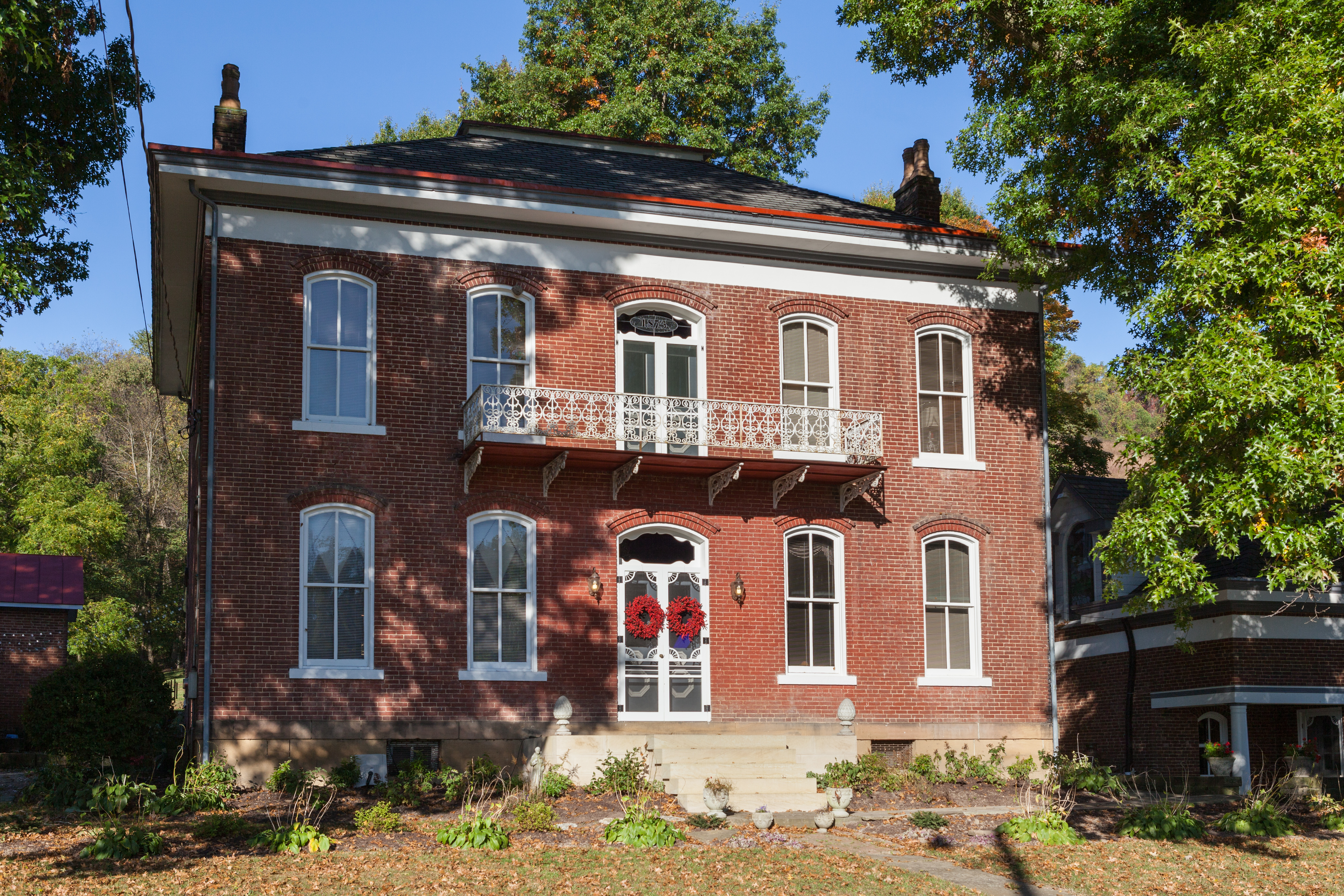
- The farmhouse in September 2014

- Location within Pennsylvania Location within the United States
- Location: 844 Craynes Run Rd., Morgan Township and Washington Township, Pennsylvania
- Coordinates: 39°57′44″N 80°09′00″W
- Area: 192 acres (78 ha)
- Built: 1850, 1873
- MPS: Agricultural Resources of Pennsylvania MPS
- NRHP reference No.: 03001191
- Added to NRHP: June 28, 2010

The McClelland–Grimes Farm is an historic farm that is located in Morgan Township and Washington Township in Greene County, Pennsylvania, United States.

It was listed on the National Register of Historic Places in 2010.

== History and architectural features ==
The contributing resources are the brick main house (c. 1873), brick combination ice house/smoke house, timber frame barn (1883), wood frame sheep barn (c. 1890), wood frame wash house (c. 1910), early twentieth-century corn crib, wood frame scale shed (c. 1940), mid-twentieth century balloon frame poultry house, poured concrete cistern, and walled spring. The surrounding farm property is a contributing site.
