= Herold, West Virginia =

- Unincorporated community
- Location within West Virginia Location within the United States
- Coordinates: 38°34′02″N 80°48′35″W
- Country: United States
- State: West Virginia
- County: Braxton
- Elevation: 928 ft (283 m)
- Time zone: UTC-5 (Eastern (EST))
  - Summer (DST): UTC-4 (EDT)
- Area codes: 304 & 681
- GNIS feature ID: 1549736

Herold is an unincorporated community in Braxton County, West Virginia, United States. Herold is located along the Birch River and County Route 40, 8.6 miles (13.8 km) southwest of Sutton. Herold had a post office, which opened on September 3, 1891, and closed on December 23, 1984.
