= Bill Tudor =

American businessman (1921–1986)

- Born: William S. Tudor; September 17, 1921; McDowell County, West Virginia, U.S.
- Died: January 5, 1986 (aged 64); Elkview, West Virginia, U.S.
- Resting place: Elk Hills Memorial Park; Big Chimney, West Virginia, U.S.
- Occupation: Businessman
- Spouse: Erma Mae
- Children: 7

William S. Tudor (September 17, 1921 – January 5, 1986) was an American businessman who founded the food chain Tudor's Biscuit World in Charleston, West Virginia, in 1980.

== Personal life ==
William S. Tudor was born on September 17, 1921, in McDowell County, West Virginia, to Mary Banks Tudor (born 1893) and Joseph Henry Tudor (born 1891) in 1921. His brother's name is Josiah (born 1919).

== Career ==
Tudor worked at several fast food businesses in North Carolina. He bought a Country Kitchen in Greensboro. He worked at a gas stop in Bolt, West Virginia, until 1944. He then worked at a diner in Charleston, West Virginia, until 1977. In 1961, he moved to Greensboro and worked for Andrew Jergens Company. He then worked at Pizzaville on Battleground Avenue. He then worked at Arby's. At Pizzaville and Arby's, he made biscuits.

In 1979, he and his wife bought a building for US$63,000. A year later they turned it into a restaurant. In November 1980, they named the restaurant Tudor's Biscuit World. Tudor moved to West Virginia and opened several Tudor's Biscuit World restaurants in four states. By March 1985, he owned or was a partner in seven of his Biscuit World restaurants and had franchised 12 more. In that year, he had expanded the business to Virginia and his son Lewis was joining the business.

== Personal life ==
Tudor married Erma Mae. They had two sons and one daughter, John, Louis and Tona. He lived in Greensboro for a time.

Tudor died on January 5, 1986, at his home on Reunion Road in Elkview, West Virginia. He was buried in Elk Hills Memorial Park in Big Chimney.
