= Caress, West Virginia =

Unincorporated community in West Virginia, United States

Caress
- Unincorporated community
- Location within the state of West Virginia Caress (the United States)
- Coordinates: 38°42′16″N 80°32′57″W
- Country: United States
- State: West Virginia
- County: Braxton
- Time zone: UTC-5 (Eastern (EST))
  - Summer (DST): UTC-4 (EDT)
- GNIS feature ID: 1549620

Caress is an unincorporated community in Braxton County, West Virginia, United States.

== History ==
A post office called Caress was established in 1888, and remained in operation until it was discontinued in 1954. The community was probably named for a family of settlers.
