= Braxton County Schools =

School district in West Virginia, United States

Location
- Sutton, West Virginia Braxton County, West Virginia United States

District information
- Type: Public School District
- Superintendent: Rhonda Combs
- NCES District ID: 5400120

Other information
- Website: boe.brax.k12.wv.us

Braxton County Schools is the operating school district within Braxton County, West Virginia. It is governed by the Braxton County Board of Education, located in Sutton.

== Board of education ==
The Braxton County Board of Education is made up of the following members:

- Evelyn Post, President
- Kevin Gregory
- Larry Hardway
- Dr. Kenna Seal
- Lisa Ratliff

== Schools ==
=== High schools ===
- Braxton County High School, Sutton

=== Middle schools ===
- Braxton County Middle School, Sutton

=== Elementary schools ===
- Burnsville Elementary School, Burnsville
- Davis Elementary School, Gassaway
- Flatwoods Elementary School, Flatwoods
- Frametown Elementary School, Frametown
- Little Birch Elementary School, Sutton
- Sutton Elementary School, Sutton
