= Little Otter, West Virginia =

Little Otter
- unincorporated community
- Location within the state of West Virginia Little Otter (the United States)
- Coordinates: 38°41′10″N 80°45′49″W
- Country: United States
- State: West Virginia
- County: Braxton
- Time zone: UTC-5 (Eastern (EST))
  - Summer (DST): UTC-4 (EDT)
- GNIS feature ID: 1554970

Little Otter is an unincorporated community in the Otter District of Braxton County, near Gassaway, West Virginia, United States.

The community takes its name from nearby Little Otter Creek.
