= Gip, West Virginia =

Unincorporated community in West Virginia, United States

Gip
- Unincorporated community
- Location within the state of West Virginia Gip (the United States)
- Coordinates: 38°40′40″N 80°59′38″W
- Country: United States
- State: West Virginia
- County: Braxton
- Time zone: UTC-5 (Eastern (EST))
  - Summer (DST): UTC-4 (EDT)

Gip is an unincorporated community in Braxton County, West Virginia, United States. Gip's elevation is 932 feet and the community is located in the Eastern time zone.

The community's name is derived from shortening and alteration of the name of Frank Gibson, an early postmaster.
