= Clem, West Virginia =

Unincorporated community in West Virginia, United States

- Unincorporated community
- Location within West Virginia Location within the United States
- Coordinates: 38°38′03″N 80°54′51″W
- Country: United States
- State: West Virginia
- County: Braxton
- Elevation: 978 ft (298 m)
- Time zone: UTC-5 (Eastern (EST))
  - Summer (DST): UTC-4 (EDT)
- Area codes: 304 & 681
- GNIS feature ID: 1549631

Clem is a rural unincorporated community in Braxton County, West Virginia, United States. Clem is located along County Route 30, 11.25 miles (18.11 km) west-southwest of Sutton.

A post office was established at this location in 1913. Clemuel Baxter Hart (1881-1960), the first postmaster, gave the community its name.
