= Elkview, West Virginia =

- Census-designated place (CDP)
- Interactive map of Elkview, West Virginia
- Coordinates: 38°26′16″N 81°28′55″W
- Country: United States
- State: West Virginia
- County: Kanawha
- Named for: Elk River

Area
  - Total: 1.8 sq mi (4.6 km^{2})
  - Land: 1.7 sq mi (4.4 km^{2})
  - Water: 0.077 sq mi (0.2 km^{2})
- Elevation: 604 ft (184 m)
- Highest elevation: 1,168 ft (356 m)

Population (2020)
  - Total: 1,116
  - Estimate (2024): 1,125
  - Density: 660/sq mi (250/km^{2})
- ZIP code: 25071
- Area code(s): 304, 681
- FIPS code: 54-24748
- GNIS feature ID: 1554387
- Highways: I-79; US 119; WV 4

Elkview is a census-designated place (CDP) in Kanawha County, West Virginia, United States. The population was 1,116 at the 2020 census. It is named after the Elk River, which flows into the Kanawha River.

Interstate 79, the "Jennings Randolph Expressway", provides highway access to Elkview from exit 9. U.S. Route 119 also reaches Elkview. A shopping center was built off I-79, which includes a La Quinta Inns and Suites, Kroger, and several fast food restaurants. Hundreds of people were stranded at this shopping center during the 2016 West Virginia flood, as the bridge leading to it from the interstate was washed away.

This small town is nestled between the larger town of Clendenin, and the municipality of Kanawha County, Charleston.

== Geography ==
Elkview is located at 38°26′16″N 81°28′55″W (38.437810, -81.482007), twelve miles east of Charleston.

According to the United States Census Bureau, the Elkview CDP has a total area of 1.8 square miles (4.6 km^{2}), of which 1.7 square miles (4.4 km^{2}) is land and 0.1 square mile (0.2 km^{2}) (4.49%) is water.

== Demographics ==
As of the census of 2000, there were 1,182 people, 507 households, and 370 families residing in the community. The population density was 444.4 people per square mile (270.0/km^{2}). There were 552 housing units at an average density of 325.7/sq mi (126.1/km^{2}). The racial makeup of the community was 98.82% White, 0.25% Native American, 0.25% Asian, and 0.68% from two or more races. Hispanic or Latino of any race were 0.51% of the population.

There were 507 households, out of which 27.2% had children under the age of 18 living with them, 58.2% were married couples living together, 12.4% had a female householder with no husband present, and 27.0% were non-families. 24.9% of all households were made up of individuals, and 12.4% had someone living alone who was 65 years of age or older. The average household size was 2.33 and the average family size was 2.74.

The community's age distribution is 20.0% under the age of 18, 7.3% from 18 to 24, 26.6% from 25 to 44, 27.9% from 45 to 64, and 18.3% who were 65 years of age or older. The median age was 42 years. For every 100 females, there were 90.0 males. For every 100 females age 18 and over, there were 87.3 males.

The median income for a household in the community was $35,033, and the median income for a family was $37,467. Males had a median income of $31,462 versus $21,136 for females. The per capita income for the community was $15,057. About 11.5% of families and 13.7% of the population were below the poverty line, including 18.8% of those under age 18 and 21.3% of those age 65 or over.

Historical population
Census	Pop.	Note	%±
1970	1,486		—
1980	1,161		−21.9%
1990	1,238		6.6%
2000	1,182		−4.5%
2010	1,222		3.4%
2020	1,116		−8.7%
2024 (est.)	1,125	▲	0.8%

== Education ==
Herbert Hoover High School was named in honor of former U.S. President Herbert Hoover. It was located in Clendenin, a few miles north of Elkview, prior to its extensive flood damage in 2016. The original building was torn down, and in 2020 Kanawha County broke ground for the new building in Elkview.

The following public schools serve the Elkview area.

Schools serving Elkview, West Virginia
School	Grades	Enrollment	State ranking
Herbert Hoover High School	9–12	783	#17 of 114
Elkview Middle School	6–8	613	#68 of 284
Elk Elementary Center	K–5	491	#145 of 540

== Notable people ==
- Corey Bird, attended Marshall University, selected by the Miami Marlins in the seventh round of the 2016 Major League Baseball draft
- Bill Tudor (1921–1986), founder of Tudor's Biscuit World
