= West Virginia Route 4 =

State highway in West Virginia, United States

West Virginia Route 4

Route information
- Maintained by WVDOH
- Length: 96.6 mi (155.5 km)

Major junctions
- South end: US 119 in Clendenin
- WV 36 near Clay Jct; WV 16 concurrent between Clay Jct and Ivydale; I-79 / US 19 near Gassaway; WV 15 near Sutton
- North end: WV 20 in Rock Cave

Location
- Country: United States
- State: West Virginia
- Counties: Kanawha, Clay, Braxton, Lewis, Upshur

Highway system
- West Virginia State Highway System; Interstate; US; State
← WV 3	→ WV 5

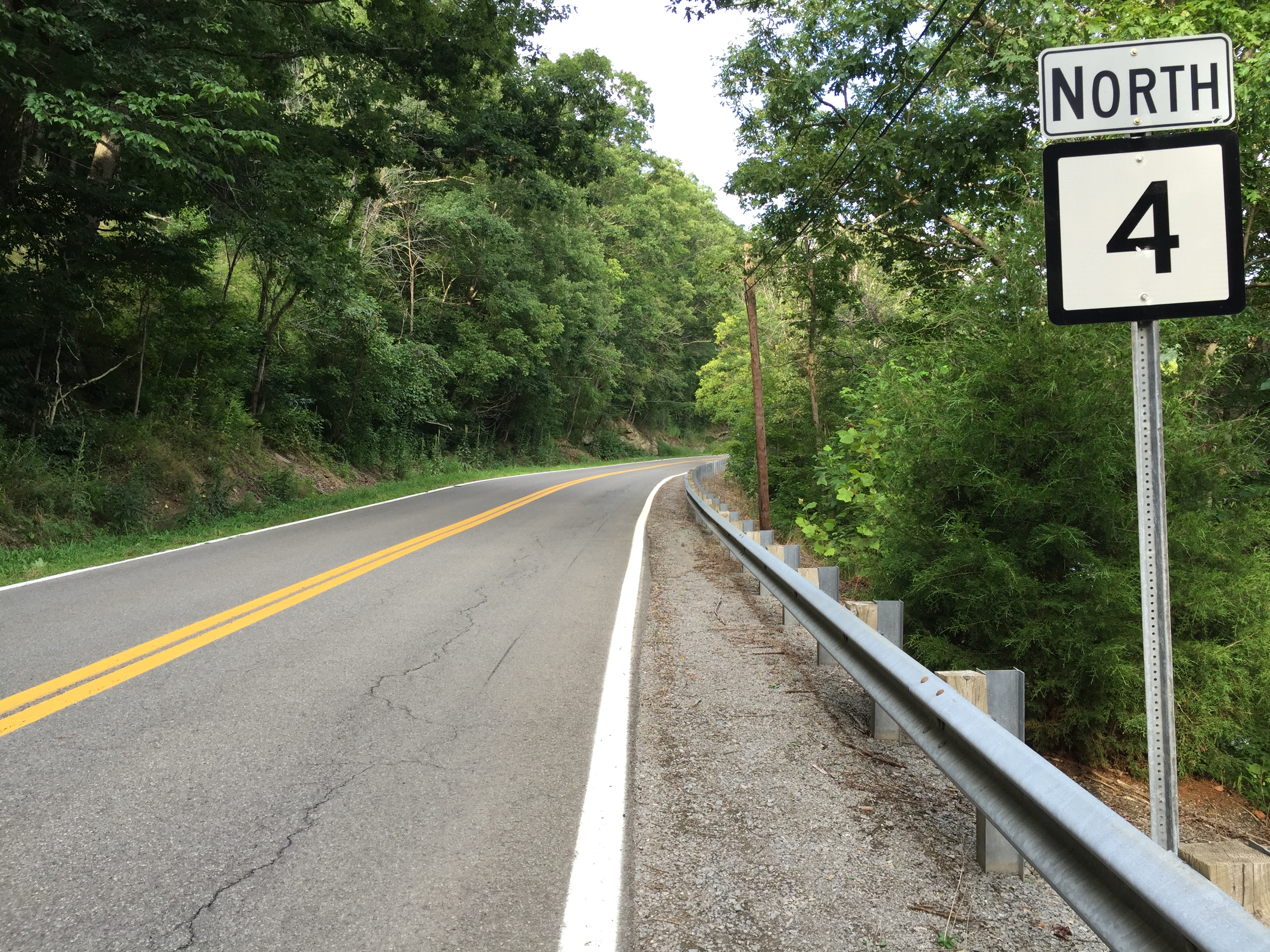
View north along WV 4 at CR 4/20 in Duck

West Virginia Route 4 is a north–south state highway within and maintained by the U.S. state of West Virginia. The southern terminus is at U.S. Route 119 in Clendenin. The northern terminus of the route is at West Virginia Route 20 in Rock Cave.

The road connects several towns in the central part of the state. WV 4 is concurrent with U.S. Route 19 from Flatwoods to Ireland.

WV 4 used to extend across the state, running west from Clendenin to Kentucky via US 119 and US 60, and north and east from Rock Cave to Virginia via WV 20, US 33, WV 28, and US 50.

== Major intersections ==
County	Location	mi	km	Destinations	Notes
Kanawha	Clendenin			US 119 to I-79 – Elkview, Spencer	
Clay				WV 36 north to I-79 – Spencer	
Clay	Clay			WV 16 south – Clay	south end of WV 16 overlap
Clay				WV 16 north to I-79 – Grantsville	north end of WV 16 overlap
Braxton				I-79 – Charleston, Clarksburg	I-79 exit 51
Braxton				I-79 / US 19 – Clarksburg, Charleston	I-79 exit 62
Braxton	Laurel Fork			WV 15 east – Airport	
Braxton				US 19 south to I-79 – Charleston, Clarksburg	south end of US 19 overlap
Braxton	Heaters			WV 5 west – Burnsville, Burnsville Lake Dam	
Lewis				US 19 north – Weston	north end of US 19 overlap
Upshur	Rock Cave			WV 20 – Buckhannon, Webster Springs, Holly River State Park	
1.000 mi = 1.609 km; 1.000 km = 0.621 mi: Concurrency terminus
