= Amma, West Virginia =

Unincorporated community in West Virginia, United States

Amma
- Unincorporated community
- Location within the state of West Virginia Amma (the United States)
- Coordinates: 38°34′7″N 81°15′56″W
- Country: United States
- State: West Virginia
- County: Roane
- Time zone: UTC-5 (Eastern (EST))
  - Summer (DST): UTC-4 (EDT)
- ZIP code: 25005
- Area codes: 304 and 681

Amma is an unincorporated community in Roane County, West Virginia, United States. Its elevation is 722 feet (220 m).

Amma was named after the daughter of a settler.
