= Rock Cave, West Virginia =

Rock Cave
- Unincorporated community
- Location within the state of West Virginia Rock Cave (the United States)
- Coordinates: 38°50′12″N 80°20′33″W
- Country: United States
- State: West Virginia
- County: Upshur

Population (2020)
  - Total: 319
- Time zone: UTC-5 (Eastern (EST))
  - Summer (DST): UTC-4 (EDT)
- ZIP codes: 26215, 26234
- Area code: 304

Rock Cave is a census designated unincorporated community in Upshur County, West Virginia, United States. The town is located southwest of Buckhannon at the junction of West Virginia Route 4 with County Routes 11/2 and 20/28.

As of the 2020 census, Rock Cave had a population of 319.

Throughout the community's history, Rock Cave has been known as Bob Town, Centerville, and Centreville.

The community's name is a corruption of Rock Lava, which referred to rocks purportedly of volcanic origin unearthed near the town site.

Rock Cave's public schools are operated by Upshur County Schools.

== Demographics ==
=== 2020 census ===
As of the 2020 census, there were 319 people and 204 households. There were 153 housing units in Rock Cave. The racial makeup of the city was 94.4% White, 0.3% African American and 0.3% from other races, and 5% from two or more races. Hispanics or Latinos of any race were 0.9% of the population.

Of the 204 households, 34.8% were married couples living together, 48% had a male householder with no spouse present, 17.2% had a male householder with no spouse present. The average household and family size was 2.97. The median age was 44.8 years. The median income for a household in the community was $32,667 and the poverty rate was 7.8%.
