= West Virginia Route 5 =

State highway in West Virginia, United States

West Virginia Route 5

Route information
- Maintained by WVDOH
- Length: 71.6 mi (115.2 km)

Major junctions
- West end: WV 14 in Elizabeth
- WV 16 in Grantsville; US 33 / US 119 in Glenville; I-79 in Burnsville
- East end: US 19 / WV 4 in Heaters

Location
- Country: United States
- State: West Virginia
- Counties: Wirt, Calhoun, Gilmer, Braxton

Highway system
- West Virginia State Highway System; Interstate; US; State
← WV 4	→ WV 6

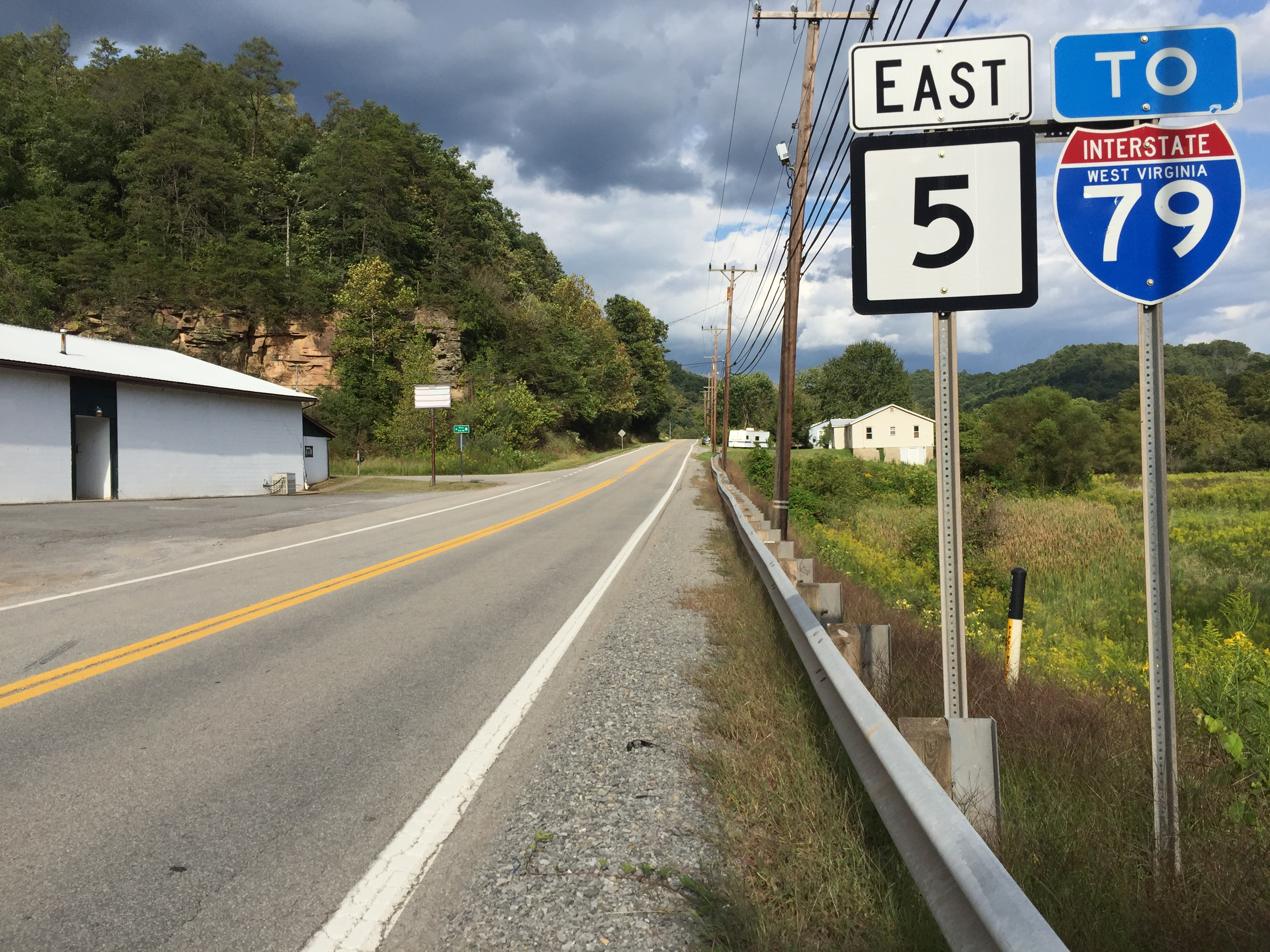
View east along WV 5 at CR 35/16 in Gilmer County

West Virginia Route 5 is an east–west state highway located in northwest West Virginia. The western terminus is at West Virginia Route 14 in Elizabeth, Wirt County. The eastern terminus is at U.S. Route 19 and West Virginia Route 4 in Heaters, Braxton County four miles (6 km) north of Interstate 79 exit 67. Almost all of WV 5 parallels the Little Kanawha River.

Originally, the eastern terminus began 4.4 miles (7.1 km) further north along US 19/WV 4 at Napier, but this part of the route became one of West Virginia's unused highways when it was closed in the mid-1970s to make way for Burnsville Lake.

== Major intersections ==
County	Location	mi	km	Destinations	Notes
Wirt	Elizabeth			WV 14 – Spencer, Parkersburg	
Wirt				WV 53 east	
Calhoun	Grantsville			WV 16 – Smithville, Millstone	
Gilmer	Glenville			US 33 west / US 119 south – Spencer, Cedar Creek State Park	west end of US 33 / US 119 overlap
Gilmer	Glenville			US 33 east / US 119 north – Weston	east end of US 33 / US 119 overlap
Braxton	Burnsville			I-79 – Clarksburg, Charleston, Burnsville Lake Dam	
Braxton	Heaters			US 19 / WV 4 – Weston, Rock Cave, Sutton, Burnsville Lake, Bulltown	
1.000 mi = 1.609 km; 1.000 km = 0.621 mi: Concurrency terminus
