= Sleith Fork =

Stream in West Virginia, U.S.

Coordinates: 38°43′15″N 80°55′59″W

Sleith Fork is a stream in the U.S. state of West Virginia. The stream consists of Upper Sleith Fork and Lower Sleith Fork.

Sleith Fork was named for an early settler.

== See also ==
- List of rivers of West Virginia
