= Cutlips Fork =

Stream in West Virginia, U.S.

Coordinates: 38°40′54″N 80°44′10″W

Cutlips Fork is a stream in the U.S. state of West Virginia.

Cutlips Fork most likely was named after the local Cutlip family.

== See also ==
- List of rivers of West Virginia
