= Pinch Creek (Elk River tributary) =

Stream in the American state of West Virginia

Coordinates: 38°24′58″N 81°29′34″W

Pinch Creek is a stream in the U.S. state of West Virginia. It is a tributary of the Elk River.

The creek, originally called Pinch Gut Creek, was so named on account of there being little food available to pioneers.

== See also ==
- List of rivers of West Virginia
