= Strange Creek (West Virginia) =

Stream in West Virginia, U.S.

Coordinates: 38°33′58″N 80°53′51″W

Strange Creek is a stream in the U.S. state of West Virginia. It was named after William Strange, a pioneer who became lost on a surveying trip in the mountains and was not seen again.

== See also ==
- List of rivers of West Virginia
