= Little Otter Creek =

Stream in West Virginia, U.S.

Coordinates: 38°40′36″N 80°46′14″W

Little Otter Creek is a stream in the U.S. state of West Virginia.

Little Otter Creek was named for the otters which once were abundant there.

Cutlips Fork flows into Little Otter Creek.

== See also ==
- List of rivers of West Virginia
