= Braxton County, West Virginia =

County in West Virginia, United States

- County
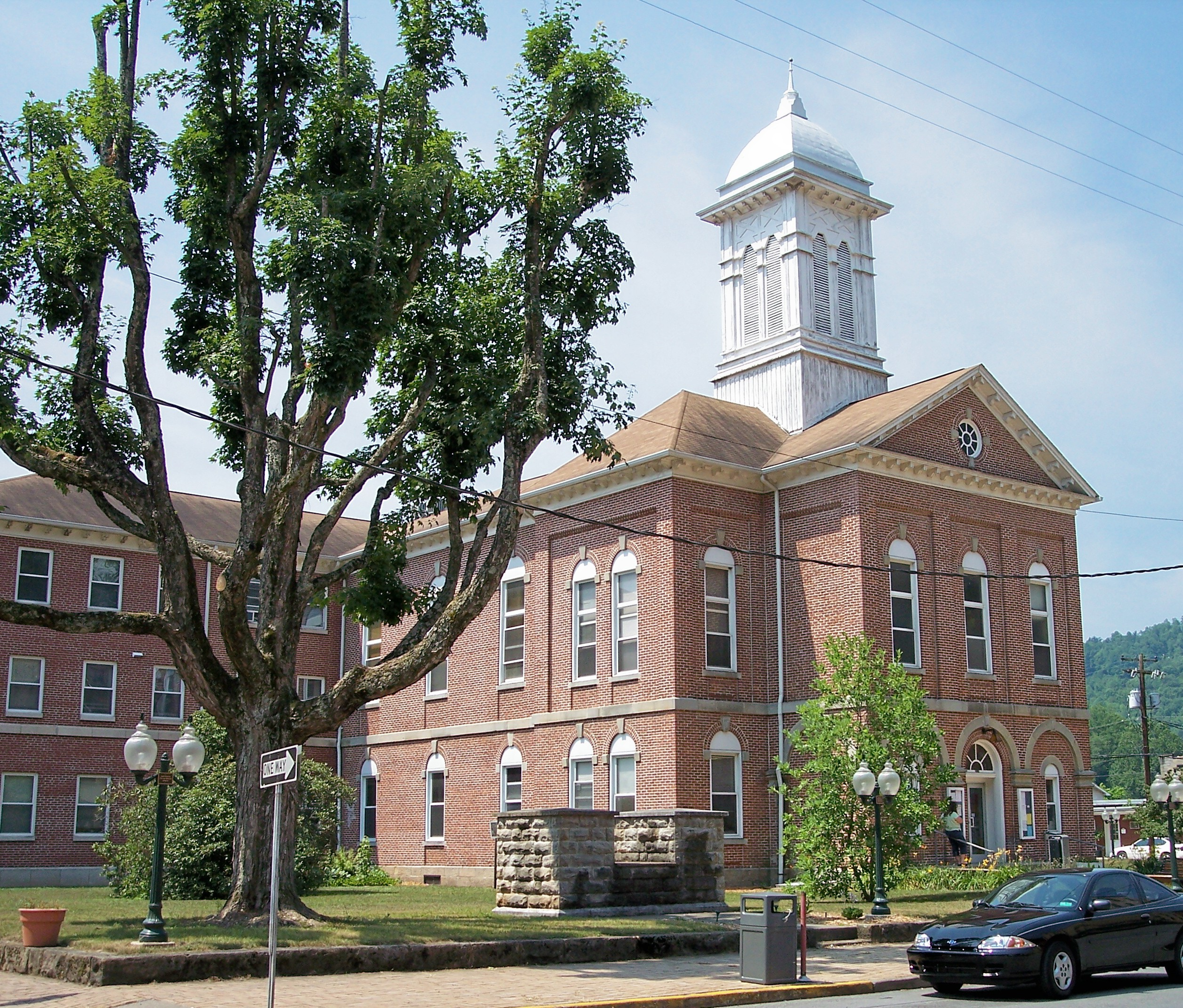
- The Braxton County Courthouse in Sutton in 2007

- Seal Logo

- Location within the U.S. state of West Virginia
- Coordinates: 38°42′N 80°44′W
- Country: United States
- State: West Virginia
- Founded: January 15, 1836
- Named for: Carter Braxton
- Seat: Sutton
- Largest town: Sutton

Area
  - Total: 516.28 sq mi (1,337.2 km^{2})
  - Land: 510.74 sq mi (1,322.8 km^{2})
  - Water: 5.54 sq mi (14.3 km^{2})

Population (2020)
  - Total: 12,447
  - Estimate (2025): 11,885 ▼
  - Density: 24.37/sq mi (9.41/km^{2})
- Time zone: UTC−5 (Eastern)
  - Summer (DST): UTC−4 (EDT)
- Congressional district: 1st
- Website: www.braxtoncountywv.gov

Braxton County is a county in the central part of the U.S. state of West Virginia. As of the 2020 census, the population was 12,447. The county seat is Sutton. The county was formed in 1836 from parts of Lewis, Kanawha, and Nicholas counties and named for Carter Braxton, a Virginia statesman and signer of the Declaration of Independence.

In 2010, the center of population of West Virginia was in northern Braxton County.

Important salt works were located at Bulltown and here, in 1772, Captain Bull and his family and friendly Delaware Indians were massacred by frontiersmen. Jesse Hughes helped Jeremiah Carpenter track and kill the Indians responsible for the Carpenter massacre. Jeremiah was a notable fiddle player who wrote a song Shelvin’ Rock about the experience of escaping to rock shelter.

== Geography ==
According to the United States Census Bureau, the county has a total area of 516 square miles (1,340 km^{2}), of which 511 square miles (1,320 km^{2}) is land and 5.5 square miles (14 km^{2}) (1.1%) is water.

In 1863, West Virginia's counties were divided into civil townships, with the intention of encouraging local government. This proved impractical in the heavily rural state, and in 1872 the townships were converted into magisterial districts. Braxton County was originally divided into four townships: Clay, Franklin, Lincoln, and Washington, which became magisterial districts in 1872. All four districts were renamed in 1873: Clay District became Kanawha, Franklin became Holly, Lincoln became Otter, and Washington became Birch. Two years later, Salt Lick District was formed from part of Kanawha. The two districts were reconsolidated between 1910 and 1920, when the territory of Kanawha District was added to Salt Lick; otherwise they remained stable for the next sixty years. Between 1980 and 1990, the county was reorganized into four new magisterial districts: Northern, Southern, Eastern, and Western.

=== Major highways ===
- Interstate 79
- U.S. Highway 19
- West Virginia Route 4
- West Virginia Route 5
- West Virginia Route 15

=== Adjacent counties ===
- Lewis County (northeast)
- Webster County (southeast)
- Nicholas County (south)
- Clay County (southwest)
- Calhoun County (west)
- Gilmer County (northwest)

== Demographics ==
Historical population
Census	Pop.	Note	%±
1840	2,575		—
1850	4,212		63.6%
1860	4,992		18.5%
1870	6,480		29.8%
1880	9,787		51.0%
1890	13,928		42.3%
1900	18,904		35.7%
1910	23,023		21.8%
1920	23,973		4.1%
1930	22,579		−5.8%
1940	21,658		−4.1%
1950	18,082		−16.5%
1960	15,152		−16.2%
1970	12,666		−16.4%
1980	13,894		9.7%
1990	12,998		−6.4%
2000	14,702		13.1%
2010	14,523		−1.2%
2020	12,447		−14.3%
2025 (est.)	11,885	▼	−4.5%
U.S. Decennial Census; 1790–1960 1900–1990; 1990–2000 2010–2020

=== 2020 census ===
As of the 2020 census, the county had a population of 12,447. Of the residents, 19.0% were under the age of 18 and 24.7% were 65 years of age or older; the median age was 47.3 years. For every 100 females there were 102.7 males, and for every 100 females age 18 and over there were 101.1 males.

The racial makeup of the county was 96.2% White, 0.4% Black or African American, 0.2% American Indian and Alaska Native, 0.2% Asian, 0.2% from some other race, and 2.8% from two or more races. Hispanic or Latino residents of any race comprised 0.7% of the population.

There were 5,175 households in the county, of which 24.9% had children under the age of 18 living with them and 25.0% had a female householder with no spouse or partner present. About 29.3% of all households were made up of individuals and 16.1% had someone living alone who was 65 years of age or older.

There were 6,251 housing units, of which 17.2% were vacant. Among occupied housing units, 77.8% were owner-occupied and 22.2% were renter-occupied. The homeowner vacancy rate was 2.0% and the rental vacancy rate was 8.7%.

The average household and family size was 3.23. The median income for a household was $42,519 and the poverty rate was 18.3%.

Braxton County, West Virginia – Racial and ethnic composition Note: the US Census treats Hispanic/Latino as an ethnic category. This table excludes Latinos from the racial categories and assigns them to a separate category. Hispanics/Latinos may be of any race.
Race / Ethnicity (NH = Non-Hispanic)	Pop 2000	Pop 2010	Pop 2020	% 2000	% 2010	% 2020
White alone (NH)	14,353	14,206	11,939	97.62%	97.81%	95.91%
Black or African American alone (NH)	101	59	50	0.68%	0.40%	0.40%
Native American or Alaska Native alone (NH)	51	38	19	0.34%	0.26%	0.15%
Asian alone (NH)	15	24	23	0.10%	0.16%	0.18%
Pacific Islander alone (NH)	7	3	11	0.04%	0.02%	0.08%
Other race alone (NH)	7	5	15	0.04%	0.03%	0.12%
Mixed race or Multiracial (NH)	103	121	305	0.70%	0.83%	2.45%
Hispanic or Latino (any race)	65	67	85	0.44%	0.46%	0.68%
Total	14,702	14,523	12,447	100.00%	100.00%	100.00%

=== 2010 census ===
As of the 2010 United States census, there were 14,523 people, 6,000 households, and 4,043 families living in the county. The population density was 28.4 people per square mile (11.0 people/km^{2}). There were 7,415 housing units at an average density of 14.5 units per square mile (5.6 units/km^{2}). The racial makeup of the county was 98.2% white, 0.4% black or African American, 0.3% American Indian, 0.2% Asian, 0.0% from other races, and 0.9% from two or more races. Those of Hispanic or Latino origin made up 0.5% of the population. In terms of ancestry, 19.7% were German, 15.0% were Irish, 11.7% were English, and 8.0% were American.

Of the 6,000 households, 28.0% had children under the age of 18 living with them, 52.8% were married couples living together, 9.5% had a female householder with no husband present, 32.6% were non-families, and 27.9% of all households were made up of individuals. The average household size was 2.36 and the average family size was 2.86. The median age was 43.8 years.

The median income for a household in the county was $32,158 and the median income for a family was $40,421. Males had a median income of $42,355 versus $22,557 for females. The per capita income for the county was $17,469. About 17.0% of families and 21.0% of the population were below the poverty line, including 30.4% of those under age 18 and 13.0% of those age 65 or over.

=== 2000 census ===
As of the census of 2000, there were 14,702 people, 5,771 households, and 4,097 families living in the county. The population density was 29 people per square mile (11 people/km^{2}). There were 7,374 housing units at an average density of 14 units per square mile (5.4 units/km^{2}). The racial makeup of the county was 98.02% White, 0.69% Black or African American, 0.35% Native American, 0.11% Asian, 0.05% Pacific Islander, 0.08% from other races, and 0.71% from two or more races. 0.44% of the population were Hispanic or Latino of any race.

There were 5,771 households, out of which 30.30% had children under the age of 18 living with them, 57.30% were married couples living together, 9.20% had a female householder with no husband present, and 29.00% were non-families. 25.20% of all households were made up of individuals, and 12.40% had someone living alone who was 65 years of age or older. The average household size was 2.46 and the average family size was 2.92.

In the county, the population was spread out, with 22.80% under the age of 18, 7.50% from 18 to 24, 28.10% from 25 to 44, 25.80% from 45 to 64, and 15.80% who were 65 years of age or older. The median age was 40 years. For every 100 females there were 102.60 males. For every 100 females age 18 and over, there were 103.00 males.

The median income for a household in the county was $24,412, and the median income for a family was $29,133. Males had a median income of $27,560 versus $17,778 for females. The per capita income for the county was $13,349. About 17.90% of families and 22.00% of the population were below the poverty line, including 27.90% of those under age 18 and 13.70% of those age 65 or over.

== Politics ==
Braxton County, although initially opposed to secession during the first session of the Virginia Secession Convention, later became supportive. Consequently, up until the decline of coal mining unionization, and growing opposition to socially controversial issues, Braxton County was overwhelmingly Democratic. Like all of West Virginia, it has seen an extremely rapid shift to the Republicans over the past five elections.

United States presidential election results for Braxton County, West Virginia
Year	Republican		Democratic		Third party(ies)	
Year	No.	%	No.	%	No.	%
1912	580	11.49%	2,611	51.74%	1,855	36.76%
1916	2,332	44.02%	2,957	55.81%	9	0.17%
1920	4,274	49.91%	4,269	49.85%	20	0.23%
1924	4,192	44.17%	5,168	54.46%	130	1.37%
1928	4,028	46.56%	4,582	52.96%	41	0.47%
1932	3,560	36.85%	6,043	62.55%	58	0.60%
1936	3,709	39.49%	5,667	60.34%	16	0.17%
1940	4,056	41.54%	5,709	58.46%	0	0.00%
1944	3,023	41.21%	4,313	58.79%	0	0.00%
1948	2,864	40.01%	4,287	59.89%	7	0.10%
1952	3,382	44.26%	4,259	55.74%	0	0.00%
1956	3,441	46.79%	3,913	53.21%	0	0.00%
1960	2,977	41.57%	4,185	58.43%	0	0.00%
1964	1,867	28.06%	4,787	71.94%	0	0.00%
1968	2,441	40.35%	3,268	54.02%	341	5.64%
1972	3,155	53.24%	2,771	46.76%	0	0.00%
1976	1,913	32.29%	4,012	67.71%	0	0.00%
1980	2,403	37.50%	3,795	59.22%	210	3.28%
1984	2,902	46.32%	3,350	53.47%	13	0.21%
1988	2,024	37.32%	3,377	62.27%	22	0.41%
1992	1,535	26.63%	3,396	58.91%	834	14.47%
1996	1,441	28.84%	3,001	60.07%	554	11.09%
2000	2,529	47.47%	2,719	51.03%	80	1.50%
2004	2,986	49.35%	3,035	50.16%	30	0.50%
2008	2,629	48.55%	2,704	49.94%	82	1.51%
2012	2,725	56.65%	1,998	41.54%	87	1.81%
2016	3,537	69.35%	1,321	25.90%	242	4.75%
2020	4,120	72.74%	1,457	25.72%	87	1.54%
2024	3,991	75.12%	1,233	23.21%	89	1.68%

== Communities ==
=== Towns ===
- Burnsville
- Flatwoods
- Gassaway
- Sutton (county seat)

=== Magisterial districts ===
- Eastern
- Northern
- Southern
- Western

=== Unincorporated communities ===
- Bonnie
- Braxton
- Canfield
- Caress
- Centralia
- Clem
- Copen
- Corley
- Cutlips
- Dingy
- Duck
- Elmira
- Exchange
- Falls Mill
- Frametown
- Gem
- Gip
- Glendon
- Heaters
- Herold
- Little Birch
- Little Otter
- Napier
- Newville
- Riffle
- Rosedale
- Servia
- Strange Creek
- Tague
- Tesla
- Wilsie

== See also ==
- Braxton County Schools
- Elk River Wildlife Management Area
- National Register of Historic Places listings in Braxton County, West Virginia
