= Burnsville, West Virginia =

Town in Braxton County, West Virginia

- Town
- Seal

- Location of Burnsville in Braxton County, West Virginia.
- Coordinates: 38°51′22″N 80°39′17″W
- Country: United States
- State: West Virginia
- County: Braxton
- Settled: 1798
- Founded: 1830
- Incorporated: 1902

Government
  - Chief of Police: Jim Ball

Area
  - Total: 1.09 sq mi (2.82 km^{2})
  - Land: 1.06 sq mi (2.74 km^{2})
  - Water: 0.035 sq mi (0.09 km^{2})
- Elevation: 810 ft (247 m)

Population (2020)
  - Total: 394
  - Estimate (2021): 393
  - Density: 451.3/sq mi (174.23/km^{2})
- Time zone: UTC-5 (Eastern (EST))
  - Summer (DST): UTC-4 (EDT)
- ZIP code: 26335
- Area code: 304
- FIPS code: 54-11716
- GNIS feature ID: 1554034
- Website: https://local.wv.gov/burnsville/Pages/default.aspx

Burnsville is a town in Braxton County, West Virginia, United States, at the confluence of the Little Kanawha River and Saltlick Creek. The population was 401 at the 2020 census. Burnsville was incorporated in 1902 by the Circuit Court and named for Captain John Burns who operated the first sawmill in that section of the state and who established the town shortly after the close of the American Civil War. It was named "All West Virginia City" in 1976.

== Geography ==
According to the United States Census Bureau, the town has a total area of 1.09 square miles (2.82 km^{2}), of which 1.06 square miles (2.75 km^{2}) is land and 0.03 square miles (0.08 km^{2}) is water.

== Demographics ==
Historical population
Census	Pop.	Note	%±
1880	120		—
1910	770		—
1920	1,088		41.3%
1930	868		−20.2%
1940	851		−2.0%
1950	731		−14.1%
1960	728		−0.4%
1970	591		−18.8%
1980	531		−10.2%
1990	495		−6.8%
2000	481		−2.8%
2010	510		6.0%
2020	394		−22.7%
2021 (est.)	393	▼	−0.3%
U.S. Decennial Census

=== 2010 census ===
As of the census of 2010, there were 510 people, 205 households, and 133 families living in the town. The population density was 481.1 inhabitants per square mile (185.8/km^{2}). There were 253 housing units at an average density of 238.7 per square mile (92.2/km^{2}). The racial makeup of the town was 97.3% White, 1.2% Native American, 0.2% Pacific Islander, and 1.4% from two or more races. Hispanic or Latino of any race were 1.2% of the population.

There were 205 households, of which 32.2% had children under the age of 18 living with them, 42.9% were married couples living together, 16.1% had a female householder with no husband present, 5.9% had a male householder with no wife present, and 35.1% were non-families. 28.3% of all households were made up of individuals, and 14.6% had someone living alone who was 65 years of age or older. The average household size was 2.49 and the average family size was 2.98.

The median age in the town was 41.4 years. 22.5% of residents were under the age of 18; 12.5% were between the ages of 18 and 24; 20.3% were from 25 to 44; 26.6% were from 45 to 64; and 18% were 65 years of age or older. The gender makeup of the town was 48.2% male and 51.8% female.

=== 2000 census ===
As of the census of 2000, there were 481 people, 208 households, and 133 families living in the town. The population density was 444.5 inhabitants per square mile (172.0/km^{2}). There were 252 housing units at an average density of 232.9 per square mile (90.1/km^{2}). The racial makeup of the town was 98.96% White, 0.42% African American and 0.62% Native American. Hispanic or Latino of any race were 0.21% of the population.

There were 208 households, out of which 26.4% had children under the age of 18 living with them, 51.9% were married couples living together, 9.6% had a female householder with no husband present, and 35.6% were non-families. 30.8% of all households were made up of individuals, and 19.2% had someone living alone who was 65 years of age or older. The average household size was 2.31 and the average family size was 2.92.

In the town, the population dispersal was 22.9% under the age of 18, 5.4% from 18 to 24, 27.4% from 25 to 44, 20.4% from 45 to 64, and 23.9% who were 65 years of age or older. The median age was 42 years. For every 100 females, there were 94.7 males. For every 100 females age 18 and over, there were 89.3 males. The median income for a household in the town was $24,167, and the median income for a family was $30,962. Males had a median income of $31,250 versus $24,500 for females. The per capita income for the town was $13,635. About 14.5% of families and 17.5% of the population were below the poverty line, including 29.5% of those under age 18 and 16.3% of those age 65 or over.

== Climate ==
The climate in this area is characterized by hot, humid summers and generally mild to cool winters. According to the Köppen Climate Classification system, Burnsville has a humid subtropical climate, abbreviated "Cfa" on climate maps.
