= Flatwoods, West Virginia =

- Town
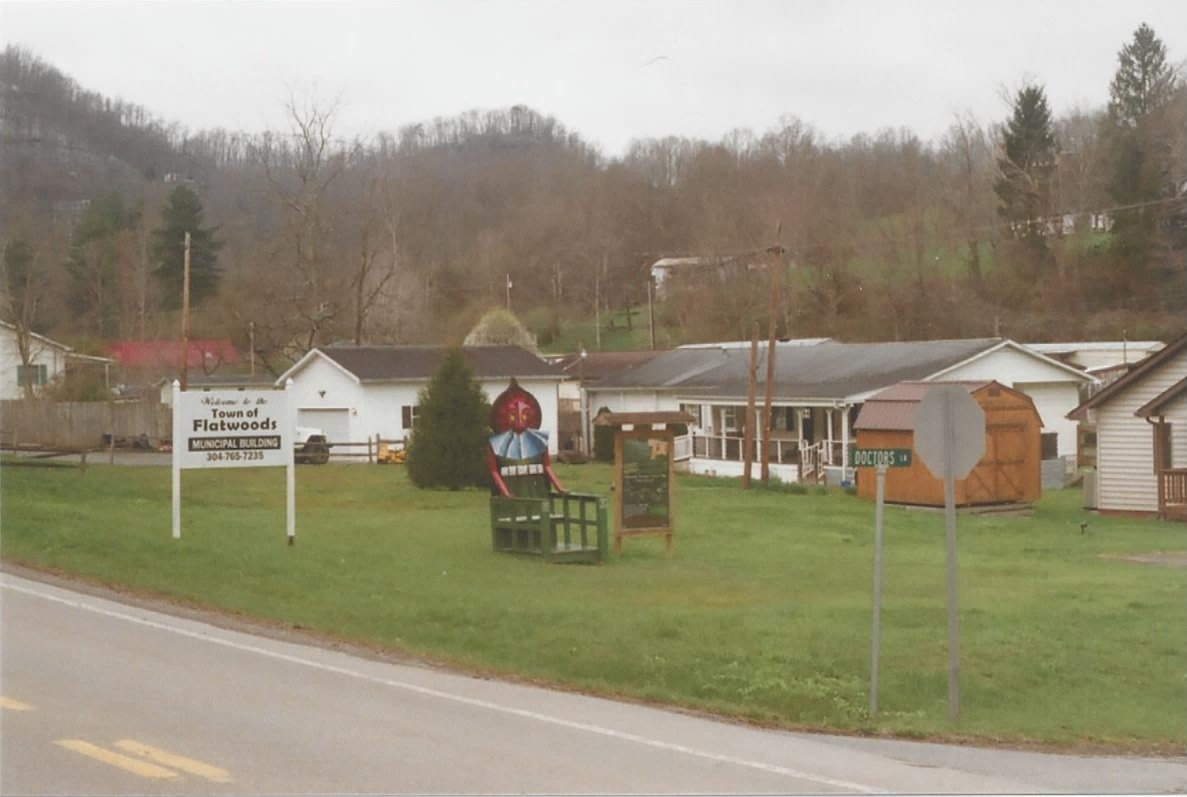

- Location of Flatwoods in Braxton County, West Virginia.
- Coordinates: 38°43′23″N 80°39′3″W
- Country: United States
- State: West Virginia
- County: Braxton
- Incorporated: 1901; 125 years ago

Government
  - Type: Mayor-Council
  - Mayor: Dale A. Ball
  - Chief of Police: Shawn Brown

Area
  - Total: 0.66 sq mi (1.70 km^{2})
  - Land: 0.66 sq mi (1.70 km^{2})
  - Water: 0 sq mi (0.00 km^{2})
- Elevation: 1,071 ft (326 m)

Population (2020)
  - Total: 264
  - Density: 402/sq mi (155/km^{2})
- Time zone: UTC-5 (Eastern (EST))
  - Summer (DST): UTC-4 (EDT)
- ZIP code: 26621
- Area code: 304
- FIPS code: 54-27868
- Website: https://flatwoodswv.org/

Flatwoods is a town in Braxton County, West Virginia, United States, located approximately one mile from exit 67 of Interstate 79.

The population of Flatwoods was 264 as of the 2020 census.

== History ==
Although first incorporated in 1902, maps show the existence of Flatwoods as a town in 1873, and a church was established by a pastor named John Clark at the community there as early as 1830. The West Virginia and Pittsburgh Railroad extended a branch through Flatwoods in the late 1800s. Later, the line was taken over by Baltimore and Ohio Railroad, and Flatwoods was a halfway point on the B&O Railroad's Clarksburg-Richwood branch, approximately 62.6 miles from the Clarksburg terminal, and 59.1 miles from the Richwood terminal. The town also served as the origin of West Virginia & Pittsburgh Railroad's Sutton Branch.

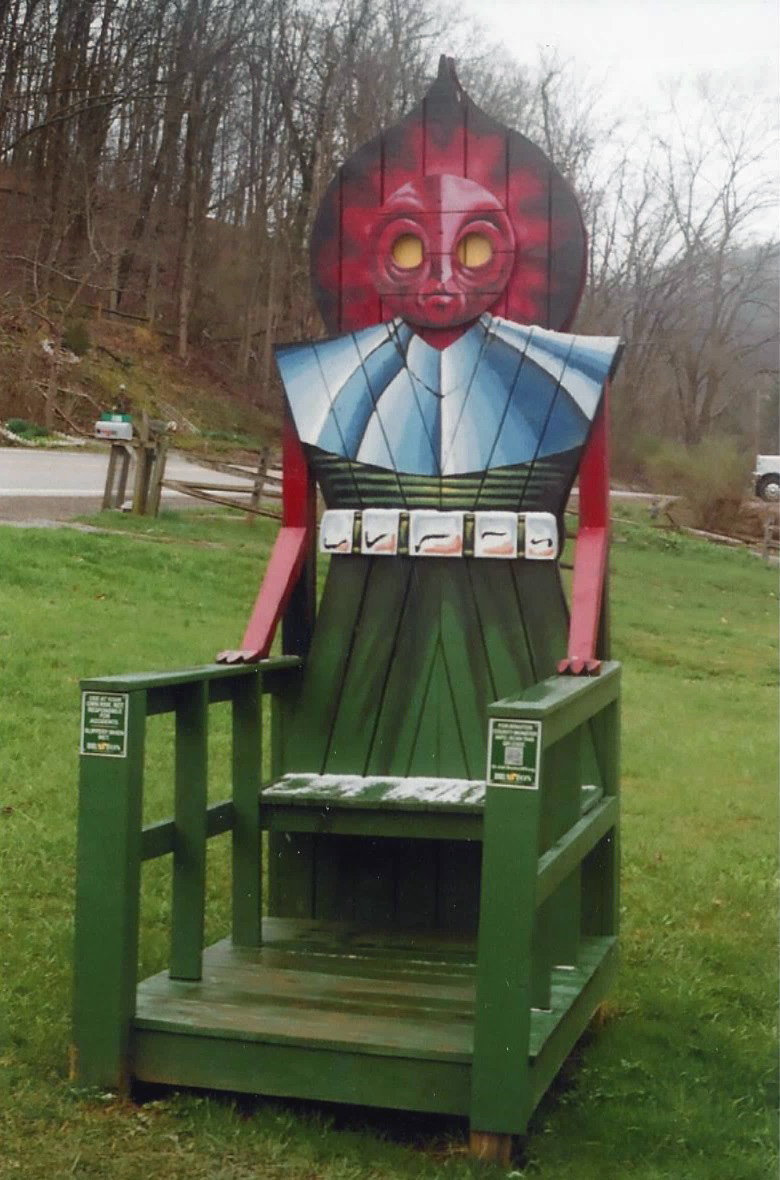
Flatwoods monster chair, on the lawn by the town hall, welcomes visitors.

The community became nationally known for the Flatwoods monster UFO incident which occurred on September 12, 1952.

== Geography ==
Flatwoods is located at 38°43′23″N 80°39′03″W (38.7231, -80.6508). According to the United States Census Bureau, the town has a total area of 0.66 square miles (1.71 km^{2}), all land.

== Demographics ==
Historical population
Census	Pop.	Note	%±
1910	284		—
1920	325		14.4%
1930	299		−8.0%
1940	308		3.0%
1950	288		−6.5%
1960	248		−13.9%
1970	220		−11.3%
1980	405		84.1%
1990	324		−20.0%
2000	348		7.4%
2010	277		−20.4%
2020	264		−4.7%
U.S. Decennial Census

=== 2010 census ===
At the 2010 census there were 277 people, 109 households, and 74 families living in the town. The population density was 419.7 inhabitants per square mile (162.0/km^{2}). There were 127 housing units at an average density of 192.4 per square mile (74.3/km^{2}). The racial makeup of the town was 99.3% White, 0.4% Asian, and 0.4% from two or more races. Hispanic or Latino of any race were 0.7%.

Of the 109 households 33.0% had children under the age of 18 living with them, 50.5% were married couples living together, 13.8% had a female householder with no husband present, 3.7% had a male householder with no wife present, and 32.1% were non-families. 28.4% of households were one person and 11% were one person aged 65 or older. The average household size was 2.54 and the average family size was 3.12.

The median age in the town was 41.2 years. 27.1% of residents were under the age of 18; 6.9% were between the ages of 18 and 24; 22.8% were from 25 to 44; 28.2% were from 45 to 64; and 15.2% were 65 or older. The gender makeup of the town was 48.4% male and 51.6% female.

=== 2000 census ===
At the 2000 census there were 348 people, 146 households, and 102 families living in the town. The population density was 328.7 inhabitants per square mile (126.8/km^{2}). There were 157 housing units at an average density of 148.3 per square mile (57.2/km^{2}). The racial makeup of the town was 97.13% White, 0.57% Asian, 0.29% Pacific Islander, and 2.01% from two or more races. Of the 146 households 29.5% had children under the age of 18 living with them, 58.2% were married couples living together, 8.9% had a female householder with no husband present, and 29.5% were non-families. 26.0% of households were one person and 13.0% were one person aged 65 or older. The average household size was 2.38 and the average family size was 2.89.

The age distribution was 24.1% under the age of 18, 5.2% from 18 to 24, 29.6% from 25 to 44, 27.9% from 45 to 64, and 13.2% 65 or older. The median age was 39 years. For every 100 females, there were 94.4 males. For every 100 females age 18 and over, there were 88.6 males. The median household income was $29,500 and the median family income was $35,250. Males had a median income of $30,000 versus $15,938 for females. The per capita income for the town was $18,025. About 11.4% of families and 18.0% of the population were below the poverty line, including 20.2% of those under age 18 and 8.6% of those age 65 or over.

== In popular culture ==
Flatwoods appears in the video game Fallout 76, set in West Virginia. It is the first main town players encounter.
