= National Register of Historic Places listings in Braxton County, West Virginia =

Location of Braxton County in West Virginia

This is a list of the National Register of Historic Places listings in Braxton County, West Virginia.

This is intended to be a complete list of the properties and districts on the National Register of Historic Places in Braxton County, West Virginia, United States. The locations of National Register properties and districts for which the latitude and longitude coordinates are included below, may be seen in a Google map.

The country lists 10 properties and districts on the National Register.

This National Park Service list is complete through NPS recent listings posted May 1, 2026.

Contents: Counties in West Virginia

Barbour - Berkeley - Boone - Braxton - Brooke - Cabell - Calhoun - Clay - Doddridge - Fayette - Gilmer - Grant - Greenbrier - Hampshire - Hancock - Hardy - Harrison - Jackson - Jefferson - Kanawha - Lewis - Lincoln - Logan - Marion - Marshall - Mason - McDowell - Mercer - Mineral - Mingo - Monongalia - Monroe - Morgan - Nicholas - Ohio - Pendleton - Pleasants - Pocahontas - Preston - Putnam - Raleigh - Randolph - Ritchie - Roane - Summers - Taylor - Tucker - Tyler - Upshur - Wayne - Webster - Wetzel - Wirt - Wood - Wyoming

== Current listings ==
	Name on the Register	Image	Date listed	Location	City or town	Description
1	Burnsville Bridge	Burnsville Bridge	March 17, 1995 (#95000254)	Bridge St. over the Little Kanawha River; 38°51′19″N 80°39′25″W	Burnsville	
2	Cunningham House and Outbuildings	Cunningham House and Outbuildings	March 21, 1984 (#84003510)	Bulltown Historic Area at Burnsville Lake; 38°47′34″N 80°33′40″W	Napier	
3	Gassaway Depot	Gassaway Depot	March 17, 1994 (#94000215)	Between 4th and 5th Sts. 38°40′16″N 80°46′36″W	Gassaway	
4	William Edgar Haymond House	William Edgar Haymond House	April 21, 2004 (#04000356)	110 S. Stonewall St. 38°39′45″N 80°42′33″W	Sutton	
5	Old Sutton High School	Old Sutton High School	August 29, 1979 (#79002570)	N. Hill Rd. 38°40′00″N 80°42′26″W	Sutton	
6	Michael Smith House		September 28, 2006 (#06000902)	End of County Route 5/1, 1 mi (1.6 km) from its junction with County Route 19/26; 38°48′39″N 80°48′04″W	Cedarville	
7	Sutton Downtown Historic District	Sutton Downtown Historic District	July 10, 1987 (#87001059)	Roughly bounded by Main St., River View Dr., and First St. 38°39′51″N 80°42′28″W	Sutton	
8	Union Civil War Fortification		March 21, 1984 (#84003515)	Bulltown Historic Area at Burnsville Lake; 38°47′23″N 80°33′51″W	Napier	
9	Weston and Gauley Bridge Turnpike	Weston and Gauley Bridge Turnpike	January 28, 1999 (#98001430)	Section between Stonewell Jackson Lake and Burnsville Lake; 38°49′39″N 80°32′07″W	Burnsville	
10	Windy Run Grade School	Windy Run Grade School	January 12, 1984 (#84003518)	Junction of CR 38 and CR 19/48; 38°35′57″N 80°43′27″W	Tesla	

== See also ==
- List of National Historic Landmarks in West Virginia
- National Register of Historic Places listings in West Virginia
