= Weston and Gauley Bridge Turnpike =

- U.S. National Register of Historic Places
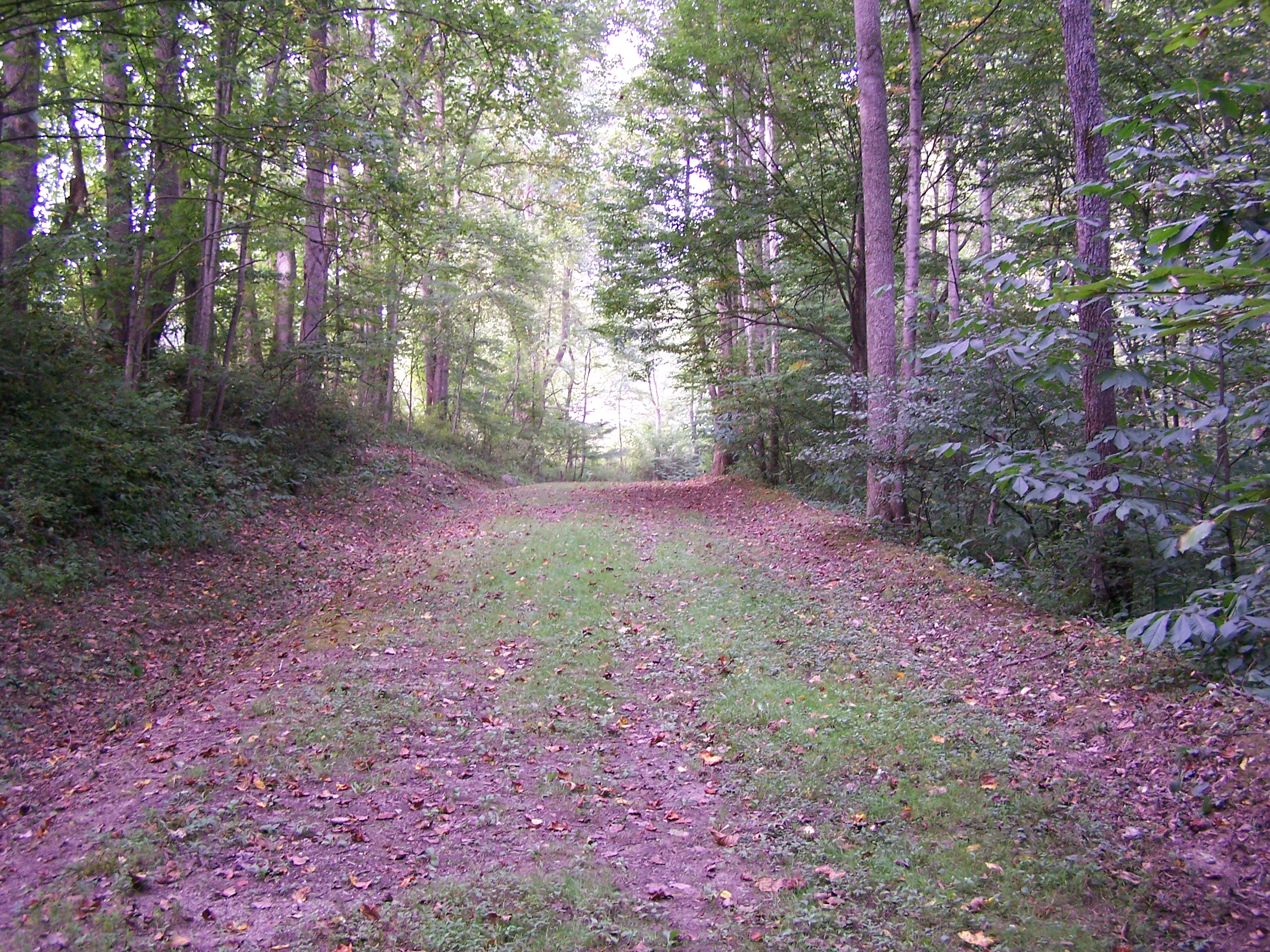
- Weston and Gauley Bridge Turnpike, Bulltown WV, August 2006

- Location within West Virginia Location within the United States
- Location: Section between Stonewall Jackson Lake and Burnsville Lake, Burnsville, West Virginia
- Coordinates: 38°49′39″N 80°32′7″W
- Area: 27 acres (11 ha)
- Built: 1861
- NRHP reference No.: 98001430
- Added to NRHP: January 28, 1999

Weston and Gauley Bridge Turnpike is a segment of a historic turnpike and hiking trail located at Burnsville, Braxton County, West Virginia. It is a 10 mile long section of trail, approximately 20 feet in width, with an unpaved surface. It is administered by the Army Corps of Engineers. The route was built starting in 1847 to provide access to Sutton for transport of product to grist mills and sawmills, access to the Bulltown sawmills and salt works, and farmland in Lewis, Braxton, and Nicholas counties. During the American Civil War, the turnpike was used in 1861 by Union troops to move to take control of western Virginia. It was also critical in the movement of troops during the Battle of Bulltown on October 13, 1863.

The turnpike was one of the first in Virginia to run in a north-south orientation. It was originally proposed to link the Northwestern Turnpike to the Parkersburg-Staunton turnpike. The construction, funded partly by the selling of stock, was delayed by multiple instances of mismanagement and conflicts of interest.

The largest bridge on the turnpike, crossing the Elk River at Sutton, was a cable suspension bridge that spanned 460 feet and was completed before 1857.

Large sections of the original turnpike were incorporated into the building of US Route 19 in the 1920's. However, much of the modern highway is located in the bottoms of valleys and no longer follows the old alignments along the ridge tops. Thus, much of the bypassed section remains in essentially original condition

The preserved 10 mile long segment was listed on the National Register of Historic Places in 1995.
