= Granny =

Granny is a term and nickname for a grandmother, a female grandparent, and may refer to:

== Characters ==
- Granny (Beverly Hillbillies character), a character on The Beverly Hillbillies television series, played by Irene Ryan
- Granny (Looney Tunes), a Looney Tunes character
- Granny Goodness, a Superman villainess
- Granny (Celeste), a character in the video game Celeste
- George "Granny" Grantham, a character from the Stephen King novella Blockade Billy
- Granny, a character created by cartoonist Buck Brown for Playboy

== Fictional works ==
- Granny (2003 film), a Russian drama film
- Granny (2026 film), an Indian Tamil-language horror film
- Armed & Delirious, released as Granny or GrannyX in some countries, a 1997 adventure video game
- The Granny, a 1995 American horror comedy film
- Granny, a spin-off from the Cuddles and Dimples strip in the British Dandy comic
- Granny, a 1994 novel by Anthony Horowitz

== People ==
- Granny Alston or Hallam Newton Egerton Alston (1908–1985), English cricketer
- Grantland Rice (1880–1954), American sportswriter
- Doris "Granny D" Haddock (1910–2010), American political activist

== Other uses ==
- Granny (orca), the oldest known orca
- Granny (sea anemone), a celebrated sea anemone from 19th-century Britain
- "Granny" (song), a song performed by Dave Matthews Band, popular at their live shows
- Granny (townland), a townland in County Londonderry, Northern Ireland

== See also ==
- Granny Creek (disambiguation)
- Granny Smith (disambiguation)
- Gran (disambiguation)
