= C. C. Kemble =

American architect (1831–?)

- Born: Charles C. Kemble; 1831; New York, US
- Occupation: Architect

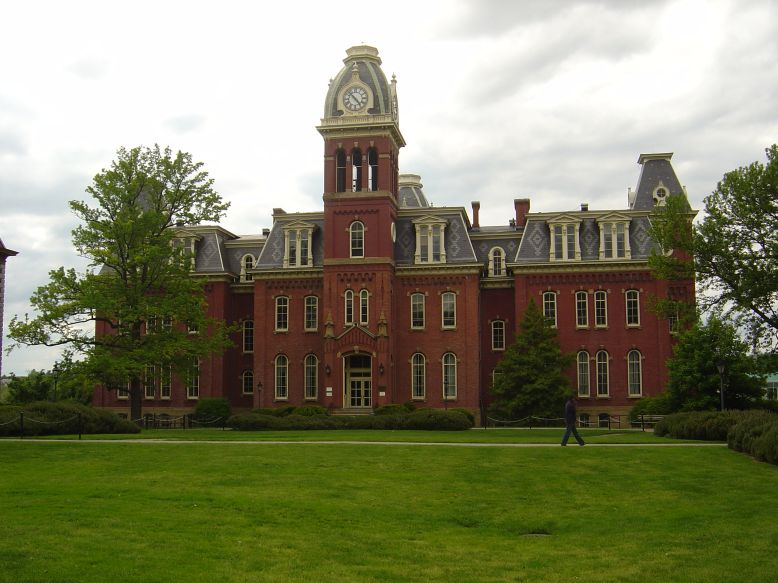
Woodburn Hall, West Virginia University, Morgantown, 1874.

Charles C. Kemble (1831–1899) was an American architect, active during the mid-to-late 19th century.

== Biography ==
Charles C. Kemble was born in New York around 1831, but little is known about his early life. He entered Bucknell University in 1856, but did not graduate. By 1868, he was working for Joseph W. Kerr in Pittsburgh. In 1870, when he completed his first West Virginia building, he was practicing in Philadelphia. But, by the time of that year's census, he was living in Wheeling with his wife and two children In 1879, he became supervising architect of the new state capitol at Charleston, with Andrew Peebles of Pittsburgh as primary architect.

In 1883, Kemble was appointed supervising architect for the new U. S. Post Office in Charleston, where he then moved. The building was built in 1884. Kemble was relieved of his duties at the state capitol that same year, and retired to Pittsburgh. He was in Chicago in 1885, and Harrisburg by 1896.

== Attributions ==
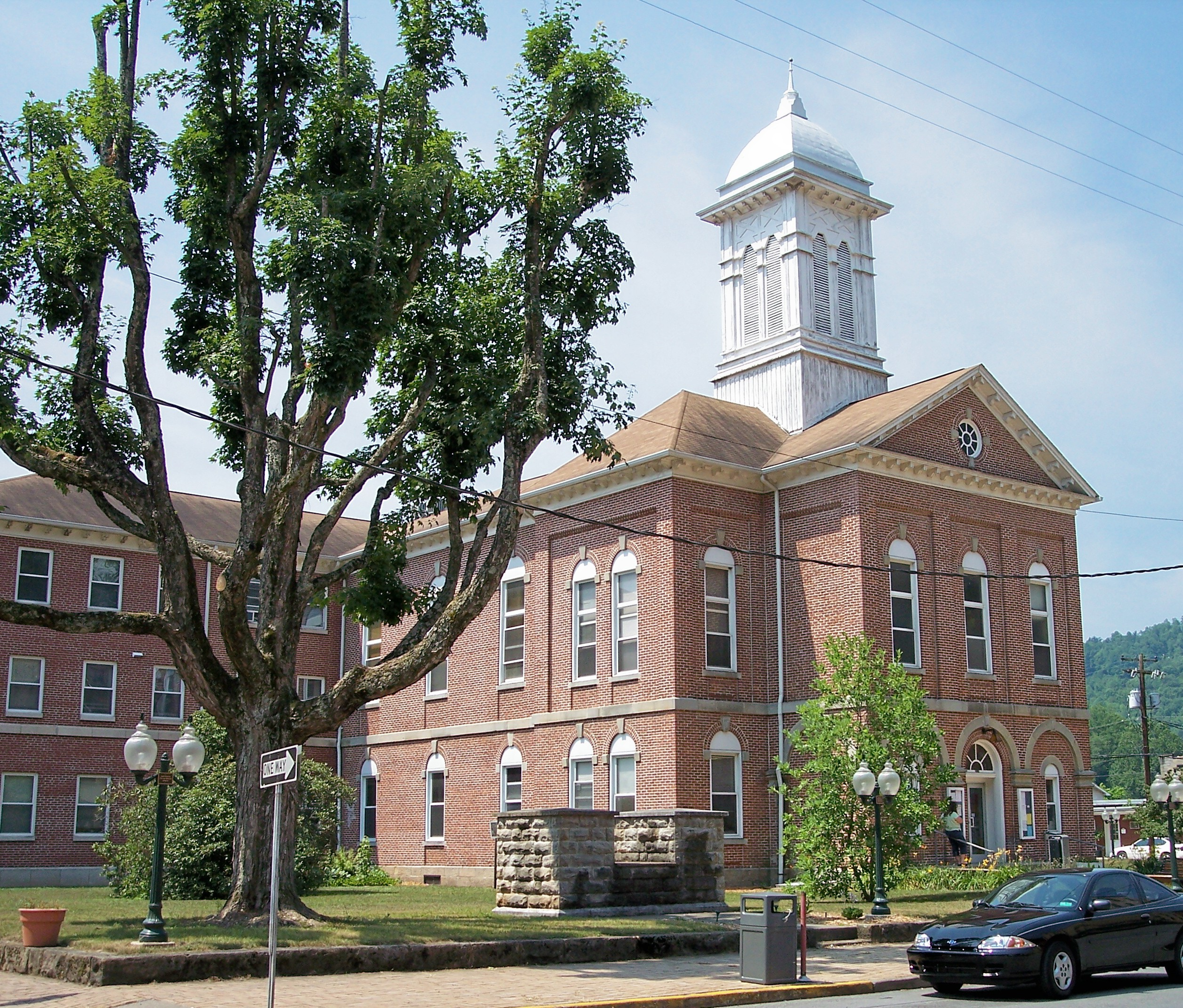
County Courthouse, Sutton, 1881.

Buildings in several states have been attributed to Kemble, including:

- 1870 - Fourth Street M. E. Church, 4th St., Wheeling, West Virginia. Demolished.
- 1872 - Steubenville High School, 420 N. 4th St., Steubenville, Ohio. Demolished.
- 1874 - Woodburn Hall, West Virginia University, Morgantown, West Virginia.
- 1875 - St. Alphonsus R. C. School, 2100 Market St., Wheeling, West Virginia.
- 1875 - Marshall County Courthouse, 600 7th St., Moundsville, West Virginia. Altered.
- 1876 - West Virginia Building, Centennial Exposition, Philadelphia, Pennsylvania. Demolished
- 1877 - Grand Theatre (Washington Hall), 1144 Market St., Wheeling, West Virginia. Heavily altered.
- 1880 - West Virginia State Capitol, Capitol, Lee, & Washington Sts., Charleston, West Virginia. Burned 1921.
- 1881 - Braxton County Courthouse, 300 Main St., Sutton, West Virginia.

Additionally, it is likely Kemble designed other buildings which have not yet been attributed to him.

Kemble's buildings were designed in a variety of styles, from sedate to elaborately fanciful. The most common architectural style he used was Second Empire, but overall his buildings were eclectic.

Woodburn Hall is the centerpiece of West Virginia University's downtown campus, and is probably Kemble's most memorable structure. It is a stunning example of the Second Empire style.
