= Bulltown =

Bulltown may refer to:

- Bulltown, Ontario, Canada, an unincorporated hamlet now known as Laskay, Ontario
- Bulltown, New Jersey, an unincorporated community in Burlington County
- Bulltown, West Virginia, a former settlement in Braxton County
  - Battle of Bulltown, a Civil War skirmish fought near Bulltown, West Virginia
