= 19th Virginia Cavalry Regiment =

- Flag of Virginia, 1861
- Active: April 1863 – April 1865
- Disbanded: April 1865
- Country: Confederate States of America
- Allegiance: Confederate States of America
- Branch: Confederate States Army
- Type: Cavalry
- Engagements: American Civil War: Jones-Imboden Raid; Expedition to Beverly, WV of 1863 June 29 – July 4; Battle of Bulltown; Marling’s Bottom, April 19, 1864; Battle of Droop Mountain; Valley Campaigns of 1864

Commanders
- Notable commanders: Col. William L. Jackson

The 19th Virginia Cavalry Regiment was a cavalry regiment raised in Virginia for service in the Confederate States Army during the American Civil War.

== History ==
During the first two years of the war, two groups of semi-organized militia operated guerilla-style in what became West Virginia in 1863. Members of the 3rd Regiment Virginia State Line (a/k/a "Moccasin Rangers"), mainly from Calhoun County, but also with Joseph Kesslers Company D from Spencer, Roane County and the 2nd Regiment Virginia State Line would become the core of the 19th Virginia Cavalry. It received that name although in April 1863 when it was organized by General John Imboden as he made his way westward toward Beverly in Randolph County, fewer than 700 of the 3,365 men owned a horse. The Moccasin Rangers had often attacked civilian targets in western Virginia in 1861 and 1862, and were called "bushwhackers." General Imboden's brother George W. Imboden commanded a detachment from McClanahan's Battery attached to the 19th Cavalry.

Peregrine (Perry) Hays (1819–1905), a merchant and postmaster at Arnoldsburg in Calhoun County (who had represented Gilmer and Wirt Counties in the Virginia House of Delegates in 1855-6 and who had become the richest man in Calhoun County by 1860 and its sheriff in 1861), had organized the 3rd Regiment State Line in 1861, together with his partner (and the Calhoun County Clerk of Court) George Silcott (1830–1903). However both had returned to Arnoldsburg in disgust with some of its activities and so were listed as deserters by Dusky. Both would be captured and twice paroled by Union forces, as well as involved as negotiators in an incident at Spencer in Roane County which ultimately redounded to the disadvantage of Union Col. John C. Rathbone. One leader of the "outlaw faction", Perry Connolley or Conley (1837–1862) died in a skirmish at Welch Glade in Webster County in January 1862; his two brothers Cornelius and James fought for the Union. Another, George Downs (1820–1899) was captured early in 1862 and convicted of raiding the federal post office at Ripley, Jackson County in 1861, but in November 1862 was exchanged for Union prisoners held in Louisiana. Downs returned to action after promotion to Major, and fought until the war's end. Another leader of the Ripley Post Office raid, Daniel Duskey (1809–?) was captured in Wirt County with 33 of his men on December 15, 1861 and sent to prison in Albany, New York after his conviction for that robbery. President Lincoln pardoned him on June 13, 1863, and he was captured again in Webster County on February 9, 1864. He escaped from the prison at Wheeling on July 18, 1865.

It fought with Jenkin's and W.L. Jackson's Brigade and confronted the Federals in western Virginia. As western Virginia voters overwhelmingly voted for independence the second time and created the state of West Virginia by passing a state constitution with anti-slavery provisions, the Moccasin Rangers formally organized in April, 1863 as Company A of the 19th Virginia Cavalry. It fought with the Army of Northern Virginia, in southwest Virginia, and in the Shenandoah Valley. The unit disbanded during April, 1865. Its commanders were Colonel William Lowther Jackson, Lieutenant Colonel William P. Thompson, and Majors George Downs and Joseph K. Kesler.

== Companies and officers ==
Sortable table
Company	Nickname	Recruited at	First (then later) Commanding Officer
A	Moccasin Rangers	Calhoun County; Wirt County	Perry Connolly (d.1862); George Downs
B	Braxton County Volunteers	Braxton County	John S. Spriggs
C	Company C	Jackson County; Roane County	Joseph R. Kessler some transferred to Company F 20th Virginia Cavalry in July 1863 but returned in August 1863
D	Company D	Marion County	John Righter
E	Company E	Gilmer County	James W. Ball
F	Pocahotas Cavalry	Pocahontas County	William L. McNeel
G	Dixie Boys	Kanawha County	Henry D. Ruffner
H	Company H	Gilmer County	William P. O'Brien
I	Company I	Randolph County; Pocahontas County	Jacob W. Marshall
K	Company K	Gilmer County	Edward Norris

== See also ==
- List of Virginia Civil War units
- List of West Virginia Civil War Confederate units
