= WDBS =

- Sutton, West Virginia; United States
- Broadcast area: Central West Virginia
- Frequency: 97.1 MHz
- Branding: The Boss 97 FM

Programming
- Format: Country
- Affiliations: West Virginia MetroNews

Ownership
- Owner: Summit Media Broadcasting, LLC
- Sister stations: WAFD, WKQV, WSGB, WVAR, WCWV, WVBD

History
- First air date: 1987
- Call sign meaning: W Da (the) BosS

Technical information
- Licensing authority: FCC
- Facility ID: 41890
- Class: B
- ERP: 22,000 Watts
- HAAT: 229 Meters
- Transmitter coordinates: 38°27′5.0″N 80°27′14.0″W
- Translator: (98.9 MHz) W255DO (Summersville)

Links
- Public license information: Public file; LMS
- Webcast: WDBS Webstream
- Website: WDBS Online

WDBS is a Country formatted broadcast radio station licensed to Sutton, West Virginia, United States, serving Central West Virginia. WDBS is owned and operated by Summit Media Broadcasting, LLC.
