= Wafd =

Wafd, WaFd, or WAFD may refer to:

- WaFd Bank, an American bank, and its holding company WaFd, Inc.
- New Wafd Party, an Egyptian political party (1978–present)
- Wafd Party, an Egyptian political party (1918–1952)
- WAFD, a radio station
