= KQV (disambiguation) =

KQV is a Pittsburgh, Pennsylvania radio station that broadcast on 1410 kHz since 1919.

KQV may also refer to:

- WDVE, a Pittsburgh, Pennsylvania radio station that originally broadcast as KQV-FM from 1962 to 1971
- WKQV, a Cowen, West Virginia radio station whose call letters are a nod to KQV in Pittsburgh, Pennsylvania
- King's Quest V, a video game produced in 1990 by Sierra Online
