= Grannies =

Grannies may refer to:

- Female grandparents (or by extension elderly women)
- Raging Grannies, name for groups of activist elderly women who advocate for social justice

== See also ==
- Granny (disambiguation)
- Grammies (Grammy Awards)
