= WSGB =

Coordinates: 38°39′11″N 80°43′10″W

- Sutton, West Virginia; United States
- Broadcast area: Sutton, West Virginia; Braxton County, West Virginia
- Frequency: 1490 kHz
- Branding: The Mighty 1490

Programming
- Format: Classic hits

Ownership
- Owner: Summit Media Broadcasting, LLC
- Sister stations: WAFD, WDBS, WKQV, WVAR, WCWV, WVBD

History
- First air date: 1964
- Call sign meaning: W Sutton Gassaway Burnsville

Technical information
- Licensing authority: FCC
- Facility ID: 41889
- Class: C
- Power: 900 watts day and night
- Translators: 92.1 W221EF (Sutton); 96.5 W243CA (Sutton)

Links
- Public license information: Public file; LMS
- Website: WSGB Online

WSGB is a classic hits formatted broadcast radio station licensed to Sutton, West Virginia, serving Sutton and Braxton County, West Virginia. WSGB is owned and operated by Summit Media Broadcasting, LLC.

== History ==
WSGB first went on the air on January 22, 1964, broadcasting from studios at 406 Main Street in downtown Sutton. The station, which has had its same call letters its entire existence, was founded by Braxton Broadcasting Company. Company president Charles M. Erhard, Jr. also owned another station, WPME (now WECZ) in Punxsutawney, Pennsylvania. Erhard frequently used WSGB as a training ground for announcers hoping to work at WPME. Erhard was proud of West Virginia's heritage and as a reflection of this, made the John Denver song "Take Me Home Country Roads" (which pays homage to the state of West Virginia) as part of the station's daily sign-on message each morning.

Erhard sold the station on May 1, 1974 to MultiMedia Associates III, a company headed by James R. Reese, Jr. Unforeseen circumstances forced another sale to Centerstate Broadcasting in September 1976. William Becker served as company president and general manager.

WSGB was sold again on June 1, 1980 to Milliken Investment Corporation. Soon afterwards, the station moved to 180 Main Street, where it remains today. The station also was granted permission to raise its nighttime power from 250 to 900 watts in the early 80s.

It was under this ownership that WSGB prospered greatly, with the sign-on of FM sister station WCKA on April 25, 1987. Milliken also transferred the license to its subsidiary, Mid-State Broadcasting Corporation, also that same year.

After almost two decades of ownership, Milliken Investment Corporation sold the station to its current owner, Summit Media Broadcasting, LLC for $250,000, along with WCKA. The sale took place on December 30, 1999.

== WSGB today ==
Following the acquisition of WSGB by Summit Media Broadcasting, WSGB underwent a major renovation of its studios and offices, which included a substantial upgrade of the station's studio facilities, moving it into the digital audio age with modern, state of the art equipment. In March 2007, Summit Media acquired WVAR in Richwood, West Virginia. Two months later, Summit Media began simulcasting WSGB's signal in an effort to improve its reception in Nicholas County, where WSGB's dial position was unable to adequately provide local service to that area.
