= WCWV =

- Summersville, West Virginia; United States
- Broadcast area: East-Central West Virginia
- Frequency: 92.9 MHz
- Branding: Nick 92.9

Programming
- Format: Contemporary Hit Radio

Ownership
- Owner: Summit Media Broadcasting, LLC
- Sister stations: WDBS, WKQV, WAFD, WVBD, WSGB, WVAR

History
- First air date: March 13, 1983
- Call sign meaning: W Central West Virginia

Technical information
- Licensing authority: FCC
- Facility ID: 54368
- Class: B
- Power: 11,000 watts
- HAAT: 274 meters
- Transmitter coordinates: 38°21′37.0″N 80°38′49.0″W

Links
- Public license information: Public file; LMS
- Webcast: WCWV Webstream
- Website: WCWV Online

WCWV is a Contemporary Hit Radio formatted broadcast radio station licensed to Summersville, West Virginia, serving East-Central West Virginia. WCWV is owned and operated by Summit Media Broadcasting, LLC.

== History and Programming ==
When it began on March 13, 1983, WCWV was the only Adult Contemporary station in Nicholas County, West Virginia and used the moniker "C-93 FM". The station played music from a prerecorded/semi-live track broadcast from another location which was also being played on multiple other small local radio stations in southern West Virginia and other areas. On Sundays the station turned its airwaves over to local churches for playing of praise, hymnal songs, and sermons. WCWV-FM broadcasts West Virginia University football and basketball games as well as football and some basketball games from Nicholas County High School.

In October 2006, the station changed its format to a Southern Gospel format, with its Sunday morning schedule devoted to local churches for songs and sermons. In 2013, the station switched back to the Adult Contemporary format, playing a variety of 1970s, 1980s, 1990s and today's music.

On May 2, 2014, after being recently acquired by Summit Media Broadcasting from R-S Broadcasting Company, Inc., WCWV flipped to its current Contemporary Hit Radio format as Nick 92.9.
