= WKQV =

- Cowen, West Virginia; United States
- Broadcast area: Richwood, West Virginia; Summersville, West Virginia
- Frequency: 105.5 MHz
- Branding: 105 KQV

Programming
- Format: Classic rock
- Affiliations: Westwood One's Classic Rock network

Ownership
- Owner: Summit Media Broadcasting, LLC
- Sister stations: WAFD, WDBS, WSGB, WVAR, WCWV, WVBD

History
- First air date: 2007
- Call sign meaning: a nod to KQV in Pittsburgh

Technical information
- Licensing authority: FCC
- Facility ID: 164254
- Class: B1
- ERP: 3,500 watts
- HAAT: 269 meters (883 ft)
- Transmitter coordinates: 38°21′35.0″N 80°38′51.0″W
- Translator: 106.9 W295AR (Sutton)

Links
- Public license information: Public file; LMS
- Website: 105kqv.com

WKQV (105.5 FM, "105 KQV") is a Classic rock formatted broadcast radio station licensed to Cowen, West Virginia, serving the Richwood/Summersville area. WKQV is owned and operated by Summit Media Broadcasting, LLC.

== Translators ==
WKQV programming is simulcast on a broadcast translator to extend and improve its signal coverage area.

Broadcast translator for WKQV
Call sign	Frequency	City of license	FID	ERP (W)	Class	FCC info
W295AR	106.9 FM	Sutton, West Virginia	145778	110	D	LMS
