= Alfred E. Jackson =

Confederate States Army brigadier general

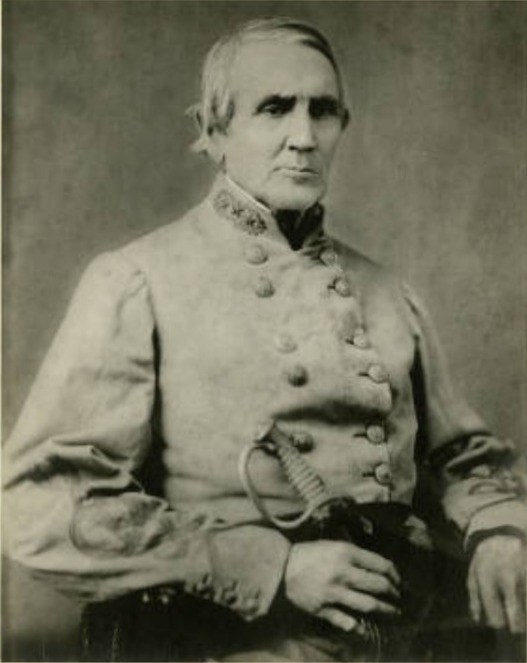
- Born: January 11, 1807; Davidson County, Tennessee
- Died: October 30, 1889 (aged 82); Jonesboro, Tennessee
- Burial place: Jonesborough, Tennessee
- Military career
- Allegiance: Confederate States of America
- Branch: Confederate States Army
- Service years: 1861–1865
- Rank: Brigadier General
- Nickname: Mudwall
- Conflicts: American Civil War: Battle of Mill Springs; Battle of Telford's Station; Battle of Blue Springs; East Tennessee and Virginia Railroad

Alfred Eugene Jackson (January 11, 1807 – October 30, 1889) was a Confederate States Army brigadier general during the American Civil War. Before the war, he was a farmer, produce wholesaler, miller, manufacturer and transporter of goods by wagon and boat. After the war, he was a tenant farmer in Virginia until he regained some of his property in Tennessee. Jackson owned 20 slaves.

== Early life ==
Jackson was born on January 11, 1807, in Davidson County, Tennessee. He attended Washington College (presumably Washington College Academy, a predecessor of Tusculum College, both of which were founded by Samuel Doak) and Greeneville College, now Tusculum College. After college he became a farmer and merchant of produce and manufactured wares. He distributed those goods from North Carolina to the Mississippi River through an extensive transportation network of wagons and boats that he established.

== American Civil War ==
Alfred E. Jackson began his Confederate States Army service as a major on September 11, 1861. Taking advantage of his experience, he served as quartermaster on the staff of Brigadier General Felix Zollicoffer until Zollicoffer was killed at the Battle of Mill Springs Jackson and his Confederate troops spent most of the war pursuing guerrillas and pitching small battles in East Tennessee, eastern Kentucky, southwestern Virginia and western North Carolina.

Jackson served as a paymaster during the Confederate military occupation of Knoxville, Tennessee under the command of then Major General E. Kirby Smith. Jackson's original appointment as a brigadier general on October 29, 1862, was canceled. He was promoted to brigadier general on February 9, 1863.

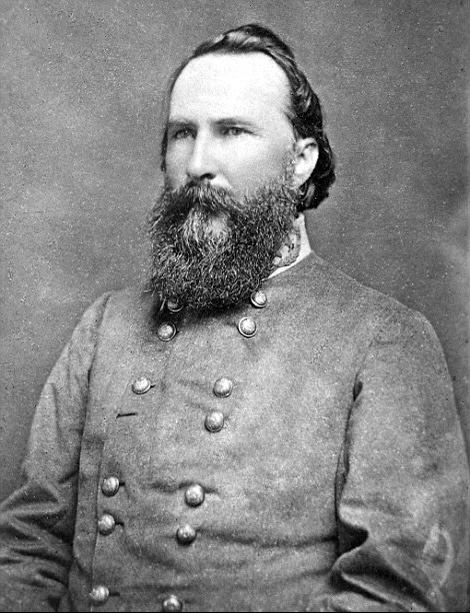
CSA Lieutenant General James Longstreet attempted to recapture Knoxville.

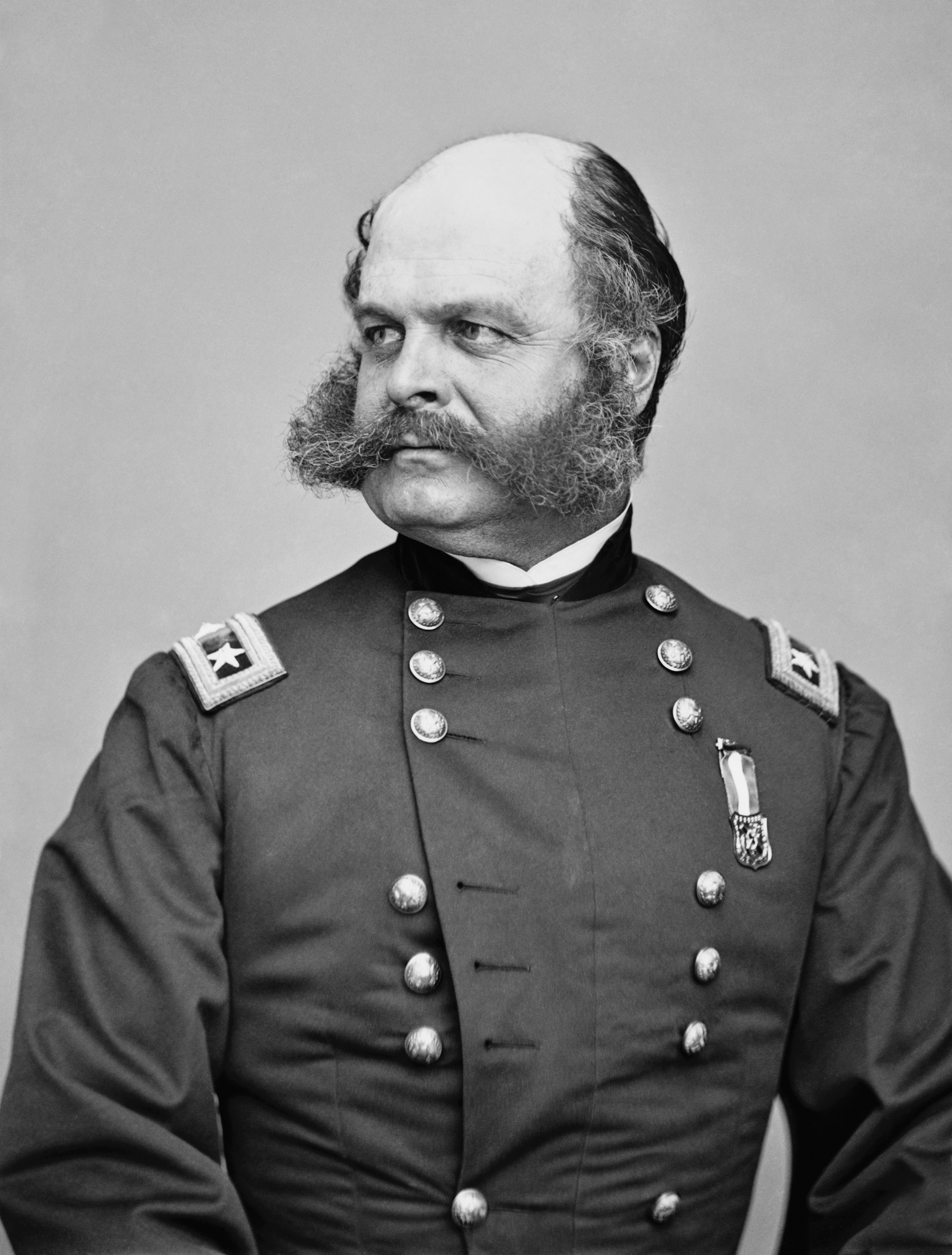
Union Major General Ambrose Burnside captured Knoxville in late 1863.

In April 1863 Jackson was given command of a brigade in the Department of East Tennessee . The brigade had both cavalry troopers and infantry soldiers and the men in the brigade were rotated in and out at various times.

In May 1863, Jackson's brigade briefly was attached to the Army of Tennessee. It took part in several minor battles and skirmishes, pursued deserters, and raided into eastern Kentucky and southwestern Virginia, attacking both Union loyalist civilians and perceived bushwackers. General Braxton Bragg criticized Jackson for the condition of his men in subsequent reports, describing them as being in "miserable order."

Jackson's brigade returned to east Tennessee and was active during Burnside's Knoxville campaign. September 8 it captured 240 men of the 100th Ohio Infantry at the Battle of Telford's Station, at present-day Telford, Tennessee. On 20 September 1863 it was among the Confederates forces attacked in a three-day battle along the area of the East Tennessee and Virginia Railroad, running from Jonesboro (present day Jonesborough, Tennessee) to a railroad bridge crossing the Watauga River at Carter's Depot (present day Watauga, Tennessee. (After the end of the Civil War, the East Tennessee and Virginia Railroad was consolidated with East Tennessee and Georgia Railroad to become the East Tennessee, Virginia and Georgia Railway). Jackson supported Brigadier General John S. Williams in his retreat after the Battle of Blue Springs on October 10. Later he helped guard the winter quarters of Lieutenant General James Longstreet's Corps northeast of Knoxville at Russellville, Tennessee, during that corps' detachment to the western theater of the war.

Jackson's brigade was assigned to Major General Robert Ransom Jr's. division between October 1863 and February 1864, Brigadier General Bushrod R. Johnson's division in February and March 1864, and Major General Simon Buckner's division in April and May 1864. All in the Confederate Trans-Allegheny Department.

From September 30, 1864, Jackson and his brigade assisted in the defense of Saltville, Virginia, in the Confederate Department of East Tennessee and West Virginia, successor to the Trans-Allegheny Department. On November 23, 1864, Jackson was assigned to light staff duty under Major General John C. Breckinridge in the same department . Historian John Stanchak states that this implies the 57-year-old Jackson was in poor health.

== Postwar years ==
After the war, Jackson was impoverished and rented land in Washington County, Virginia, which he cultivated with his own hands. President Andrew Johnson granted Jackson a special pardon on November 16, 1865, because of kindness shown by Jackson to Johnson's family in East Tennessee during the war. Because of the pardon, Jackson gradually regained enough of his property to return to Jonesboro, Tennessee.

Jackson died October 30, 1889, at Jonesboro, Tennessee, and is buried there.

== Nickname controversy ==
There is a controversy about the nickname "Mudwall." Although fellow Confederate general William Lowther Jackson from West Virginia (no family relation) has been known as such for a long time, historian Garry W. Gallagher found that the nickname was actually given to Alfred Jackson. It seems the two were mixed up in the Southern Historical Society Papers in 1906 and the error was repeated by authors who consulted those papers. At times the name has been assigned in error to a third (likewise unrelated) Confederate general, Brigadier John K. Jackson.

== See also ==
- List of American Civil War generals (Confederate)
