= William Lowther Jackson =

Virginia lawyer, politician, slaveholder and jurist

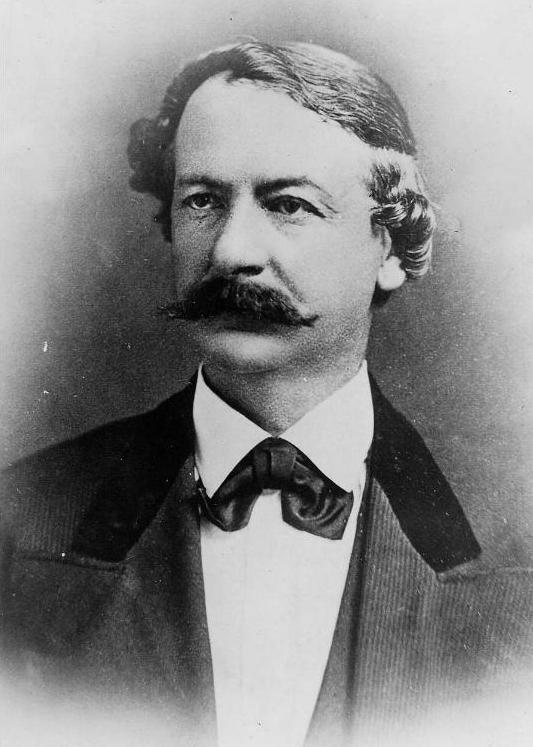

3rd Lieutenant Governor of Virginia
- In office December 7, 1857 – January 1, 1860
- Governor: Henry A. Wise
- Preceded by: Elisha W. McComas
- Succeeded by: Robert Latane Montague

Member of the Virginia House of Delegates from Wood, Wirt, Ritchie and Doddridge Counties
- In office December 2, 1850 – January 11, 1852
- Preceded by: James Cook
- Succeeded by: John J. Jackson Jr.

Member of the Virginia House of Delegates from Pleasants and Ritchie Counties
- In office January 12, 1852 – 1852
- Preceded by: n/a
- Succeeded by: Montgomery Bottom

Personal details
- Born: February 3, 1825 Clarksburg, Virginia, U.S. (now West Virginia)
- Died: March 26, 1890 (aged 65) Louisville, Kentucky, U.S.
- Resting place: Cave Hill Cemetery, Louisville, Kentucky, U.S.
- Party: Democratic
- Spouse: Sarah Elizabeth Jackson (nee Creel)
- Profession: Attorney, judge, soldier

Military service
- Allegiance: Confederate States
- Branch/service: Confederate States Army
- Years of service: 1861–1865
- Rank: Brigadier General
- Commands: 31st Virginia Infantry; 19th Virginia Cavalry; W.L. Jackson's Cavalry Brigade
- Battles/wars: American Civil War: Battle of Rich Mountain; Battle of Cheat Mountain; Valley Campaign of 1862; Seven Days Battles; Second Battle of Manassas; Battle of Sharpsburg; Battle of Fredericksburg; Jones-Imboden Raid; Battle of Bulltown; Battle of Cloyd's Mountain; Valley Campaigns of 1864

William Lowther Jackson Jr. (February 3, 1825 – March 26, 1890) was an American lawyer, Democratic politician, slaveholder and jurist who became the Lieutenant Governor of Virginia prior to the American Civil War, and later fought in the Confederate States Army, rising from his initial rank of private to General.

== Early life ==
=== Paternal ancestry ===
His great-grandparents, John Jackson (1715 or 1719 – 1801) and Elizabeth Cummins (also known as Elizabeth Comings and Elizabeth Needles) (1723–1828) emigrated to America as indentured servants after criminal convictions for larceny which otherwise could have led to their execution. A Protestant (Ulster-Scottish) from Coleraine, County Londonderry, Ireland, John Jackson had moved to London, England, where he was convicted of the capital crime of larceny for stealing £170; the judge at the Old Bailey sentenced him to seven years of indentured servitude in America. His wife, Elizabeth, a strong, blonde woman over 6 feet (180 cm) tall, had been born in London, England and was also convicted of larceny in an unrelated case (for stealing 19 pieces of silver, jewelry, and fine lace) and received a similar sentence. They were among 150 convicts transported on the prison ship Litchfield, which departed London in May 1749. John and Elizabeth met on board and were in love by the time the ship arrived at Annapolis, Maryland. Although initially sent to different locations in Maryland for their indentures, the couple married in July 1755.

The family migrated west across the Blue Ridge Mountains to settle near Moorefield, Virginia (now West Virginia) in 1758. In 1770, they moved further west to the Tygart Valley. They began to acquire large parcels of virgin farming land near the present-day town of Buckhannon, including 3,000 acres (12 km^{2}) in Elizabeth's name, although trans-Appalachian settlement had been prohibited by the peace treaty at the end of the French and Indian War. John and his two teenage sons became early recruits for the American Revolutionary War, fighting in the Battle of Kings Mountain on October 7, 1780. John finished the war as captain, then served as a lieutenant of the Virginia militia after 1787. While the men were in the Army, Elizabeth converted their home into "Jackson's Fort," to serve as a refuge against attacks by Native Americans seeking to enforce their treaty rights.

Elizabeth bore John eight children. Their eldest son, George Jackson (1757–1831), became a colonel in the Virginia militia during the Revolutionary War and later Congressman from Virginia. George and his wife, Elizabeth Brake (1757–1812), daughter of Jacob and Mary E. (née Cooper) Brake, had three children; their youngest was William's father, William Lowther Jackson Sr. (1798–1836), who also served in the Virginia militia. A cousin through another brother would be Thomas J. "Stonewall" Jackson, who would like William Lowther Jackson Jr. fight for the Confederate States of America (and receive the nickname "Mudwall" as an allusion to their relation and determination, as discussed below).

== Childhood and personal life ==
Jackson was born on February 3, 1825, in Clarksburg, Virginia (now West Virginia). Studying law he was admitted to the Bar of Virginia in 1847. Jackson married Sarah Elizabeth Creel on December 19, 1849, and together they had two or three children. Jackson was a big man, standing about six feet tall and weighing about 200 pounds. He had a shock of dark red hair and piercing blue eyes like those of his famous cousin, Thomas (Stonewall) Jackson. Mudwall Jackson was not known as an eloquent speaker, but as a forceful one.

== Prewar career ==
Jackson later became the Commonwealth's Attorney for Harrison County. Entering politics he was elected into the Virginia House of Delegates two times, first representing Wood, Wirt, Ritchie and Doddridge counties Dec. 2, 1850-until Western Virginia received more representation after adoption of a new Virginia Constitution in 1851 after a convention the previous year, then Benjamin W. Jackson represented Doddridge and Tyler Counties, John Jay Jackson Jr. represented Wood County and this William L. Jackson Pleasants and Ritchie Counties.

Jackson and other family members retained their extensive business interests in all the various counties, however. He also became Virginia's Second Auditor, as well as superintendent of the state library fund. In 1857, Jackson won his first statewide elective office, becoming Virginia's third Lieutenant Governor. In that capacity he served as President of the Virginia Senate from 1857 until 1860 (during the Assemblies of 1857–1859 and 1859–1861). Robert L. Montague succeeded him in January 1860. The legislative then made W.L. Jackson a circuit judge for the 19th district (in which he had long practiced).

== Civil War ==
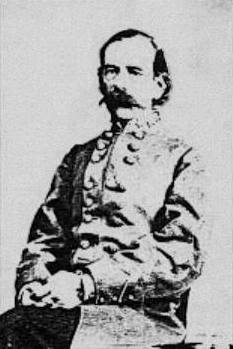
Jackson during the civil war.

When Virginia seceded from the Union, Jackson, a proponent of slavery, resigned from his position as judge and enlisted in the Confederate States Army as a Private. Recommended to General Robert E. Lee, he quickly became an officer, then Lieutenant Colonel of the 31st Virginia Infantry Regiment. Assigned to the command of Gen. Robert S. Garnett, he participated in the Western Virginia Campaign and the battles of Rich Mountain and Cheat Mountain. In July 1861 he was promoted to rank of Colonel. In early 1862 he became a Volunteer Aide-de-camp to his cousin, Maj. Gen. Thomas J. Jackson; and participated in his campaigns during the year.

William's younger brother George, who was a graduate of West Point (Class of 1856), resigned from the U.S. Army, and also became a colonel in the Confederate Army.

In February 1863, as West Virginia's constitutional convention adopted a new constitution with the provision abolishing slavery demanded by the U.S. Congress (and which President Lincoln had signed into law on December 31, 1862), Confederate authorities authorized William Jackson to organize a mounted regiment for service behind enemy lines. He thus recruited the 19th Virginia Cavalry, which immediately joined the Jones-Imboden Raid, first under command of Albert G. Jenkins, then under John D. Imboden. Jackson stayed in western Virginia, promoted to command a cavalry brigade. He fought at Bulltown and confronted Union Gen. George Crook returning into West Virginia following Crook's victory at the Battle of Cloyd's Mountain. In 1864 Jackson joined CSA Lt. Gen. Jubal Early in the Valley Campaigns from May to October. He received his promotion to brigadier general on December 19, 1864.

On April 15, 1865, six days after Gen. Lee surrendered the Army of Northern Virginia at Appomattox Court House, Jackson disbanded his brigade. Refusing to surrender, however, he headed westwards, finally receiving a parole in Brownsville, Texas, on July 26, 1865.

== Later life and death ==
Temporarily emigrating to Mexico, Jackson returned to what was now West Virginia, then learned that the new state barred former Confederate officers from practicing law in the state. He then moved to Louisville, Kentucky, where he was allowed to resume his practice of law. Jackson became a circuit judge again and kept this position for his remaining life.

He died on March 26, 1890, of Bright's disease in Louisville; and was interred there on Cave Hill Cemetery.

== Nickname controversy ==
William L. Jackson is one of three Confederate generals associated with the nickname "Mudwall", a reference to the "Stonewall" nickname given to his cousin Thomas. While William Jackson has been known as such for a long time, it was found by noted historian Garry W. Gallagher that the nickname was originally given to fellow Confederate General Alfred E. Jackson from Tennessee (no family relation). It seems the two were mixed up in the Southern Historical Society Papers in 1906 and the error was involuntarily repeated afterwards. Sometimes the name is even attributed to another (likewise not related) Confederate Brigadier, John K. Jackson. It is also possible that at times the name was attributed to several of the Jacksons simultaneously.

== See also ==
- Alfred E. Jackson
- List of American Civil War generals (Confederate)
- Stonewall Jackson
- Virginia in the American Civil War
- West Virginia in the American Civil War

== Bibliography ==
- Hardway, Ronald V.; On Our Own Soil: William Lowther Jackson and the Civil War in West Virginia's Mountains; Quarrier Press, Charleston WV; October 3, 2003; ISBN 978-1-891852-27-5

Political offices
Preceded by Elisha W. McComas	Lieutenant Governor of Virginia; 1857–1860	Succeeded by Robert L. Montague
