= Union Civil War Fortification =

- U.S. National Register of Historic Places
- Location within West Virginia Location within the United States
- Location: Bulltown Historic Area at Burnsville Lake, near Napier, West Virginia
- Coordinates: 38°47′34″N 80°33′40″W
- Area: 4.1 acres (1.7 ha)
- Built: 1861
- MPS: Bulltown MRA
- NRHP reference No.: 84003515
- Added to NRHP: March 21, 1984

Union Civil War Fortification, also known as Bulltown Civil War Site, is a historic archaeological site located near Napier, Braxton County, West Virginia. The site relates to the American Civil War Battle of Bulltown, that took place on October 13, 1863. During test excavations in the 1970s, remnants of structures, features, and artifacts were recovered. The site was purchased by the Army Corps of Engineers during the development of Burnsville Lake, and is administered as part of the Bulltown Historic Area.

It was listed on the National Register of Historic Places in 1984.

== See also ==
- Cunningham House and Outbuildings
