= Elisha W. McComas =

American politician

Elisha Wesley McComas (January 21, 1823 – March 11, 1890) was a Virginia lawyer and politician who served as the second Lieutenant Governor of Virginia in 1856 and 1857 under Governor Henry A. Wise, but resigned because of the administration's handling of John Brown's raid on Harpers' Ferry.

== Early and family life ==
The eldest son born to Judge William McComas and his wife Mildred in 1822, he received an education appropriate to his class. His brothers included William Wirt McComas (who fought with the Giles Artillery of the Confederate States Army), Judge Hamilton Calhoun McComas (who enlisted as a Lt. Col. for the Union in Illinois but resigned on February 6, 1863, and later served two terms as a judge in Monticello, Illinois as well as married U.S. Senator Ware's sister but died in an Apache raid near Silver City, New Mexico), Rufus French McComas and Benjamin Jefferson McComas (both remaining in Cabell County after it became part of West Virginia). His sister Irene married George McKendree.

On September 8, 1842, he married Arianna Holderby, and they had a daughter Alice (born 1843) and sons Henry F. McComas (born 1845), Walter McComas (born 1850) and Gordon McComas (born 1860). A man named Elisha McComas served as Captain in the U.S. Army during the Mexican–American War (possibly the same man). Cabell County had several related men sharing the same name, one of whom served as a private with the 3rd Regiment of West Virginia Cavalry during the Civil War.

== Career ==
Elisha W. McComas read law and had been admitted to the Virginia bar. He served as prosecuting attorney for Logan County from 1846 to 1852. In 1855, he was elected Virginia's lieutenant governor, thus presiding over the Virginia Senate. He began his term on January 1, 1856, and resigned on December 7, 1857, being succeeded by William Lowther Jackson. His father was a Cabell County delegate to the Virginia Secession Convention of 1861 and voted against secession, though his brother William W. McComas would volunteer for the Confederate States Army and die in 1862, and another brother Hamilton Calhoun McComas would briefly fight for the Union Army before resigning his commission and moving to Fort Scott, Kansas, where Elisha W. McComas and his family also moved after the war.

== Death and legacy ==
Elisha McComas died at Fort Scott, Bourbon County, Kansas on March 11, 1890. At his death, the Logan County Banner of Logan, West Virginia, declared him as "the wisest of West Virginia lawyers."

Political offices
Preceded by Shelton Farrar Leake	Lieutenant Governor of Virginia; 1856–1857	Succeeded by William Lowther "Mudwall" Jackson
