= Granny Creek =

Granny Creek may refer to:

- Granny Creek (Missouri), a stream in Missouri
- Granny's Creek, a stream in West Virginia
