= Cunningham House and Outbuildings =

Historic house in West Virginia, United States

- U.S. National Register of Historic Places
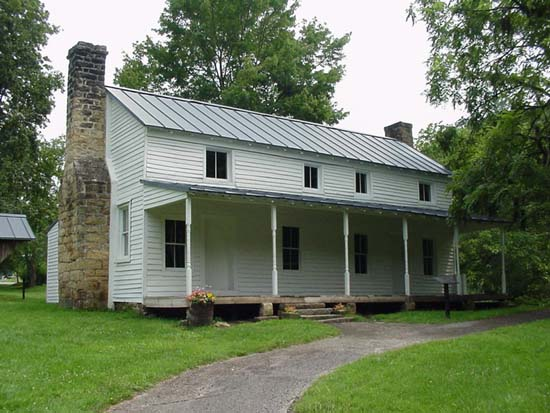
- Cunningham House

- Location within West Virginia Location within the United States
- Location: Bulltown Historic Area at Burnsville Lake, near Napier, West Virginia
- Coordinates: 38°47′34″N 80°33′40″W
- Area: 0.7 acres (0.28 ha)
- MPS: Bulltown MRA
- NRHP reference No.: 84003510
- Added to NRHP: March 21, 1984

Cunningham House and Outbuildings, also known as Cunningham Farm, is a historic home located near Napier, Braxton County, West Virginia. The house dates to the 1830s, and is a two-story, log structure sided with white clapboards. Also located on the property is a food cellar and granary. The buildings are representative of traditional central West Virginia subsistence farming techniques. The site was purchased by the Army Corps of Engineers during the development of Burnsville Lake, and is administered as part of the Bulltown Historic Area.

It was listed on the National Register of Historic Places in 1984.

== See also ==
- Union Civil War Fortification
