= WVAR =

Coordinates: 38°13′50″N 80°32′49″W

- Richwood, West Virginia; United States
- Broadcast area: Richwood, West Virginia; Craigsville, West Virginia; Summersville, West Virginia
- Frequency: 600 kHz
- Branding: The Mighty 1490

Programming
- Format: Classic hits

Ownership
- Owner: Summit Media Broadcasting, LLC
- Sister stations: WAFD, WDBS, WKQV, WSGB, WCWV, WVBD

History
- First air date: November 16, 1957 (as WMNF)
- Call sign meaning: West VirginiA Radio

Technical information
- Licensing authority: FCC
- Facility ID: 54372
- Class: D
- Power: 1,000 watts (daytime); 55 watts (nighttime)
- Translators: 92.5 W223DF (Summersville); 98.9 W255DO (Summersville)

Links
- Public license information: Public file; LMS
- Website: WVAR/WSGB Online

WVAR is an American radio station located in Richwood, West Virginia that plays a classic hits format.

The station also carries West Virginia University basketball and Richwood High School sports. While it simulcasts sister station WSGB full-time, WVAR breaks away for sports broadcasts.

== History ==
=== As WMNF ===
WVAR first went on the air on November 16, 1957, and first broadcast at 1280 AM under the call letters WMNF. The original owner was Royal Broadcasting Company, of which Herman Dotson served as president and Art Grunewald as general manager. Studios were located along Cemetery Road in Richwood. By 1959, the call letters were changed to WVAR, as they remain today.

=== As WVAR ===
On January 1, 1965, WVAR was sold to R & S Broadcasting. Carl Gainer was the new company president, and Virgil Graves became General Manager. In 1968, WVAR moved from its dial position of 1280 kHz to 600 kHz. The station retained its daytime-only broadcast hours and output power of 1,000 watts.

In 1991, WVAR moved its studios and offices to 713 Main Street in Summersville, but would maintain a local presence in Richwood at 2 Rhododendron Drive, formerly known as Cemetery Road. On December 24, 1996, after more than 30 years of ownership, WVAR was sold by R & S Broadcasting to J & K Broadcasting. The ownership change also resulted in the pairing of an FM sister station, WAFD, which had gone on the air earlier that year with a southern and country gospel format.

In mid-February 2003, an ice storm that ravaged the southern part of West Virginia toppled the WVAR broadcasting antenna atop Hinkle Mountain which overlooks Richwood. In the following summer the station and its owner raised funds to erect a new antenna. The station was closed with a dark license while funds were sought to replace it.

On March 13, 2007, J & K Broadcasting, Inc. sold WVAR to Summit Media Broadcasting, LLC for $1.24 million in a transaction that included sister FM station WAFD in Webster Springs. Summit Media also owns WDBS-FM and WSGB-AM. Studios were moved to 202 Back Fork Street in Webster Springs.

On May 15, 2007, WVAR dropped its country format and began simulcasting sister WSGB-AM's oldies format as "The Mighty 1490". That October, Summit Media filed an application with the FCC to waive main studio requirements for WVAR, which would allow on-air operations to be co-located with WSGB and other stations in Summit Media's ownership group.

=== Translator ===
In November 2009, Summit Media filed an application to rebroadcast WVAR's signal over FM translator W251AY, licensed to Birch River. The translator, licensed to operate at 98.1 MHz, broadcasts at 250 watts at a height of 256 m above average terrain. The translator, which has been on the air since 2004, had been previously used to rebroadcast the signal of sister FM station WDBS.
