= Crook's 1862 Expedition =

American Civil War

- Part of American Civil War
Date	January 1, 1862
Location	Western Virginia (now West Virginia)

Crook's 1862 Expedition was an engagement of the American Civil War in western Virginia (the present state of West Virginia). Major General George Crook's forces advanced northward to Braxton County's community of Sutton, which had reportedly been occupied and burned by Confederate forces on December 29, 1861. The report turned out to be false.
