= Master of Dimensions =

Israeli video game

- Developer(s): Makh-Shevet
- Publisher(s): Eidos Interactive
- Release: 1996
- Genre(s): Point and click adventure

Master of Dimensions (שליט המימדים) is a 1996 adventure video game by Israeli developer Makh-Shevet (through their division Mad Engine) and published by Eidos Interactive.

== Development ==
After several years of translating foreign adventure games into Hebrew Makh-Shevet created Master of Dimensions as its first original title. Master of Dimensions is based on an RPG of the same name that Makh-Shevet founder Oren Obstblum created with some friends in 1985 as a result of his dissatisfaction with current RPG. He and his friends started fantasizing about traveling into parallel dimensions to fantastic places and eras. Later when creating a video game, he decided to draw from this idea. The game was programmed by Eric Siegel, who incorporated both 3D and 2D animation.

The game's publisher was Eidos Interactive, who were following up their interactive adventure The Riddle of Master Lu. It was distributed in English under licence by US Gold while Polish distributor of the game, Mirage, produced a localised version under the title Władca Wymiarów. It was localised for the Brazilian market by BraSoft Corporation. The German version featured well-known German voice actors.

At the time, it was one of the only Israeli computer games developed and distributed outside Israel.

The game was relatively successful, and very popular in Europe, leading to Makh-Shevet developing another, less successful puzzle adventure game called Grenix. Master of Dimensions' elderly woman character Omis would later feature in the 1997 Makh-Shevet title Armed & Delirious.

== Plot ==
Players take the role of a young man who must try to save the magician Merlin. The game features a dozen interconnected mini-stories, which correspond to different dimensions the player visits, ranging from detective comics and classic fantasy elements to ultra-realistic mega-cities. The game has a point-and-click interface.

== Critical reception ==
Critical reception to the game has been mixed.

PC Top Player deemed it a mediocre video game, criticising its unoriginal plot and simple gameplay. Metzomagic critiqued the game's "occasional obscure solution and seeming dead-end, humungous maze and a timed puzzle". Świat Gier Komputerowych liked its "nice graphics, well-chosen difficulty level and...variety". Gry komputerowe wrote it is "well-designed in terms of graphics". Micromania felt the game had "interesting characters and well-plotted stories". PC Player praised the game's "lovely little details" including its music, gags and decent voicework, but criticised the pixel hunting. The magazine added that despite the game experiencing the "teething troubles of a first work", its "small, loving details" reflected the earnestness of its creators.

Paul Ricketts of The Post noted the game's "variety of locations" and "character interaction" as entertaining aspects. PC Home praised graphical elements including large scale character sprites, and camera changes. Folha De Londrina felt the player would have to "work hard" to decipher the game's puzzles. PC Games enjoyed the game's "optical and acoustic details". Meanwhile, PC Joker thought the game had replayability due to its variable solutions.
