= Tesla, West Virginia =

- Unincorporated community
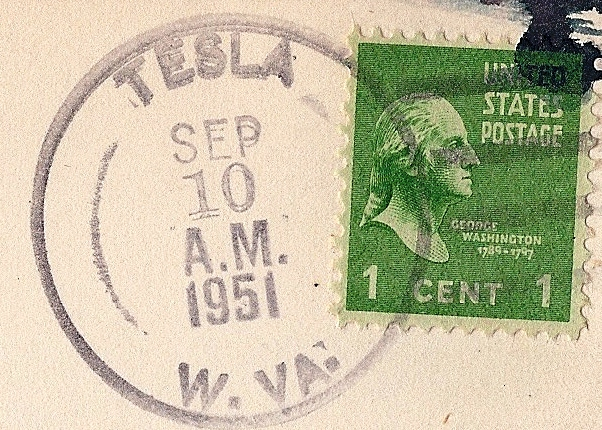
- Tesla West Virginia Postmark

- Location within West Virginia Location within the United States
- Coordinates: 38°36′07″N 80°42′12″W
- Country: United States
- State: West Virginia
- County: Braxton
- Elevation: 1,181 ft (360 m)
- Time zone: UTC-5 (Eastern (EST))
  - Summer (DST): UTC-4 (EDT)
- ZIP codes: 26640
- Area codes: 304 & 681
- GNIS feature ID: 1555794

Tesla is an unincorporated community in Braxton County, West Virginia, United States. Tesla is 4.5 miles (7.2 km) south of Sutton.

The community might be named after a variant of the surname "Teasley" or Nikola Tesla (1856–1943), an electrical engineer and inventor. Located near Tesla is the Windy Run Grade School, listed on the National Register of Historic Places in 1983.
