= WVBD =

- Fayetteville, West Virginia; United States
- Frequency: 100.7 MHz
- Branding: West Virginia's Big Daddy

Programming
- Format: Classic Country
- Affiliations: AP Radio, Dial Global

Ownership
- Owner: Summit Media South, Inc.
- Sister stations: WAFD, WDBS, WKQV, WSGB, WVAR, WCWV

Technical information
- Licensing authority: FCC
- Facility ID: 165958
- Class: A
- ERP: 480 watts
- HAAT: 343.0 meters (1,125.3 ft)
- Transmitter coordinates: 37°55′40.40″N 80°58′11.50″W
- Translator: (100.7 MHz) W264DW (Beckley)

Links
- Public license information: Public file; LMS
- Webcast: WVBD Webstream
- Website: WVBD Online

WVBD (100.7 FM, "West Virginia's Big Daddy") is a radio station broadcasting a classic country music format. Licensed to Fayetteville, West Virginia, United States, the station is currently owned by Summit Media South, Inc. and features programming from AP Radio and Dial Global.
