= Napier, West Virginia =

Napier
- Unincorporated community
- Location within the state of West Virginia Napier (the United States)
- Coordinates: 38°47′27″N 80°35′20″W
- Country: United States
- State: West Virginia
- County: Braxton
- Time zone: UTC-5 (Eastern (EST))
  - Summer (DST): UTC-4 (EDT)
- ZIP codes: 26631
- GNIS feature ID: 1549844

Napier is an unincorporated community in Braxton County, West Virginia, United States, founded in 1894, with the ZIP code of 26631. Napier has two significant historical landmarks: the Cunningham House and Outbuildings and the Union Civil War Fortification, and both are listed on the National Register of Historic Places.
