= Windy Run Grade School =

- U.S. National Register of Historic Places
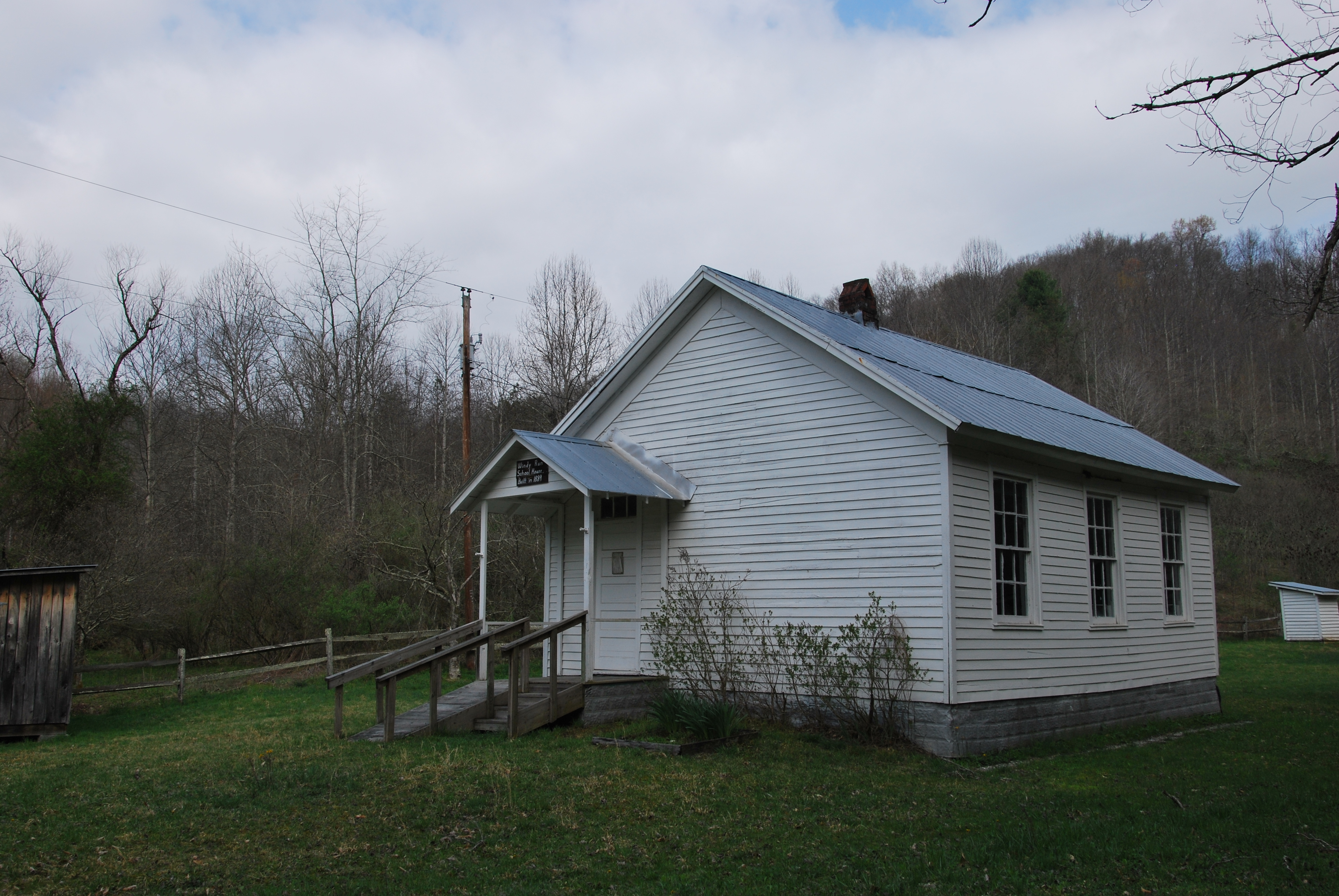
- Windy Run Grade School in March 2012

- Location within West Virginia Location within the United States
- Location: Junction of CR 38 and CR 19/48, near Tesla, West Virginia
- Coordinates: 38°35′57″N 80°43′27″W
- Area: 0.5 acres (0.20 ha)
- Built: 1889
- Architect: Huffman, Jacob
- NRHP reference No.: 84003518
- Added to NRHP: January 12, 1984

Windy Run Grade School, also known as Windy Run School, is a historic one-room school located near Tesla, Braxton County, West Virginia. It was built in 1889, and is a one-story wood-frame structure measuring 24 feet wide and 28 feet deep. Also on the property is a small, gable roofed privy. It ceased use as a school in 1963.

It was listed on the National Register of Historic Places in 1983.
