= WAFD =

Radio station in Webster Springs, West Virginia

- Webster Springs, West Virginia; United States
- Broadcast area: East Central West Virginia
- Frequency: 100.3 MHz
- Branding: 100.3 The Summit

Programming
- Format: Hot adult contemporary

Ownership
- Owner: Summit Media Broadcasting, LLC
- Sister stations: WDBS, WKQV, WSGB, WVAR, WCWV, WVBD

History
- First air date: 1996

Technical information
- Licensing authority: FCC
- Facility ID: 9300
- Class: B
- ERP: 25,000 watts
- HAAT: 213 meters
- Transmitter coordinates: 38°27′39.0″N 80°25′13.0″W

Links
- Public license information: Public file; LMS
- Website: WAFD Online

WAFD (100.3 FM, "The Summit") is a hot adult contemporary formatted broadcast radio station licensed to Webster Springs, West Virginia, serving East Central West Virginia. WAFD is owned and operated by Summit Media Broadcasting, LLC. In late 2011, WAFD 100.3 dropped the 1980s format and shifted to a more modern Hot AC station.
