= Sutton Downtown Historic District =

Historic district in West Virginia, United States

- U.S. National Register of Historic Places
- U.S. Historic district
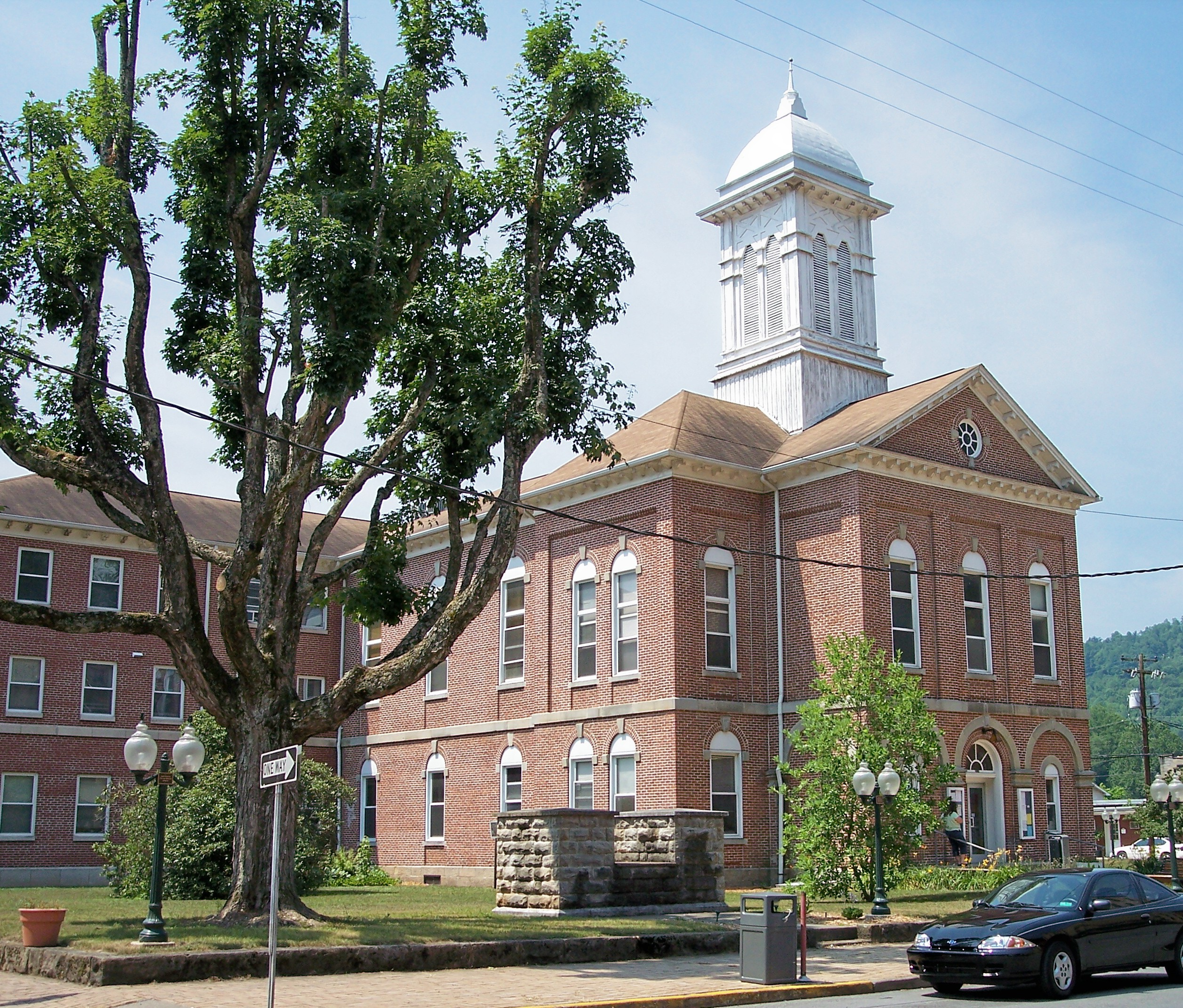
- Braxton County Courthouse, July 2007

- Location within West Virginia Location within the United States
- Location: Roughly bounded by Main St., River View Dr., and First St., Sutton, West Virginia
- Coordinates: 38°39′51″N 80°42′28″W
- Area: 27 acres (11 ha)
- Built: 1870
- Architect: Kimble, C.C.
- Architectural style: Mid 19th Century Revival, Late 19th And 20th Century Revivals, Late Victorian
- NRHP reference No.: 87001059
- Added to NRHP: July 10, 1987

Sutton Downtown Historic District is a national historic district located at Sutton, Braxton County, West Virginia. It encompasses 85 contributing buildings and two contributing structures covering eleven square blocks. The district includes the commercial, ecclesiastical, and civic core of the town and surrounding residential area. The district includes a number of buildings representative of popular architectural styles from the late-19th century and early-20th century including Romanesque Revival, Colonial Revival, Gothic Revival, and Greek Revival. Notable buildings include the Braxton County Courthouse (1881-1882) and Jail (1905), Sutton Bank Building (1891), Farmers Bank and Trust (1909), Bank of Sutton (c. 1900), Methodist Episcopal Church, South (1896), Kelly / Fisher House (c. 1870). Elk / Midway Hotel (1894), and Katie B. Frame Residence (c. 1880). The two structures are the Bridge over Old Woman Run (1892) and Bridge over Elk (1930).

It was listed on the National Register of Historic Places in 1987.
