= Old Woman Run =

Stream in West Virginia, U.S.

Coordinates: 38°39′48″N 80°42′12″W

Old Woman Run is a stream in the U.S. state of West Virginia.

Old Woman Run was named after "Old Woman", a bear that lived in the nearby woods until she was killed by a local hunter.

== See also ==
- List of rivers of West Virginia
