= Old Sutton High School =

Historic school building in West Virginia, United States

- U.S. National Register of Historic Places
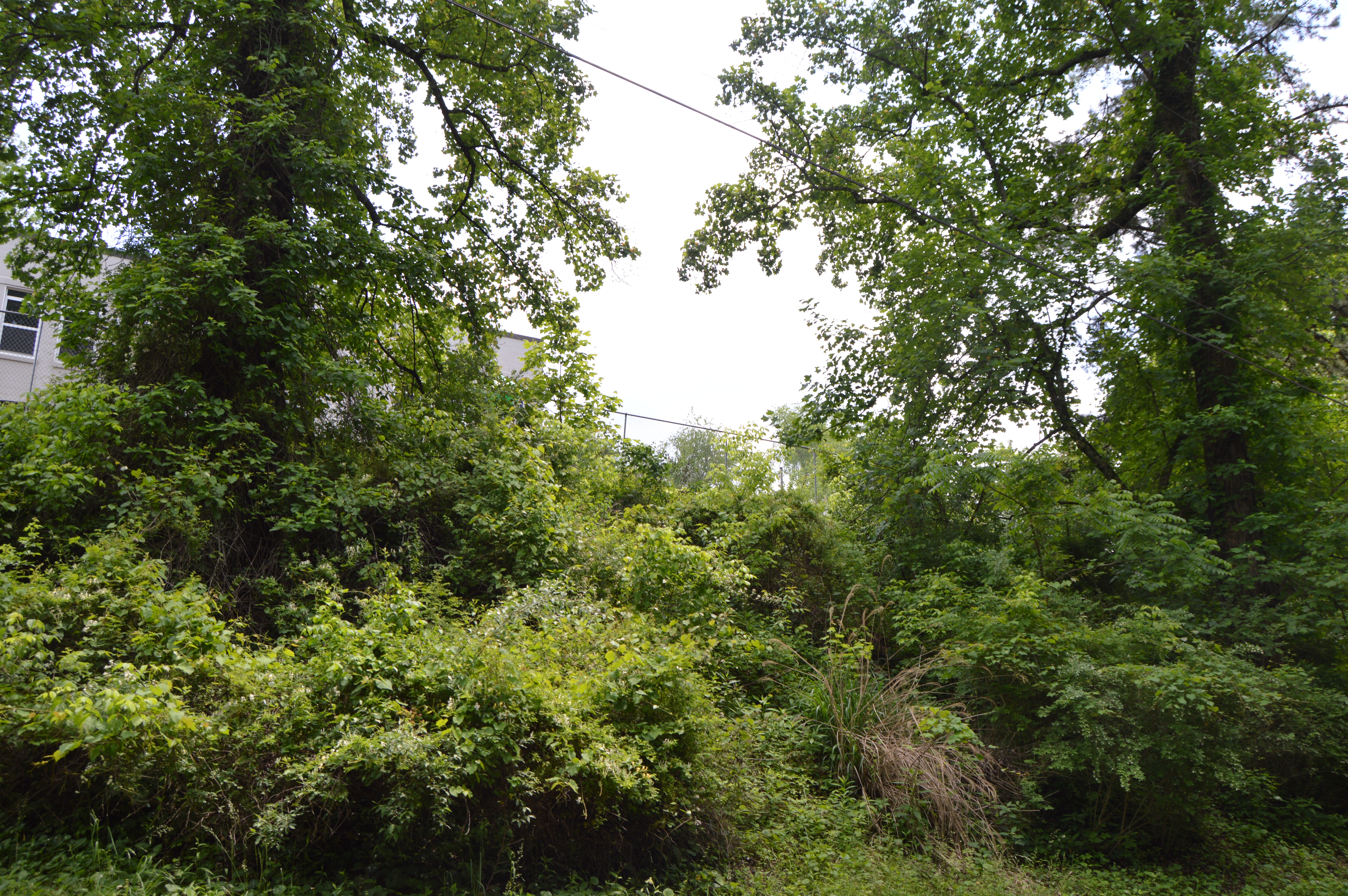
- Site of the school

- Location within West Virginia Location within the United States
- Location: N. Hill Rd, Sutton, West Virginia
- Coordinates: 38°40′00″N 80°42′26″W
- Area: 1.5 acres (0.61 ha)
- Built: 1906
- Architect: Will F. Davis
- NRHP reference No.: 79002570
- Added to NRHP: August 29, 1979

Old Sutton High School, also known as Sutton Grade School, was a historic school located at Sutton, Braxton County, West Virginia. It was built in 1906, and was a three-story red brick building. It measured 68 feet by 64 feet and featured a three-story, truncated entrance tower. It housed eight classrooms, a full basement, and an auditorium on the third floor. Rooms had high, pressed tin ceilings.

It was listed on the National Register of Historic Places in 1979, and demolished in 2008.
