= Bulltown, West Virginia =

- Ghost town
- Location of Bulltown in West Virginia Bulltown, West Virginia (the United States)
- Coordinates: 38°47′19″N 80°33′59″W
- Country: United States
- State: West Virginia
- County: Braxton
- Elevation: 791 ft (241 m)
- Time zone: UTC-5 (Eastern (EST))
  - Summer (DST): UTC-4 (EDT)
- GNIS feature ID: 11452

Bulltown is an extinct town in Braxton County, West Virginia, United States. The GNIS classifies it as a populated place.

== Geography ==
Bulltown is located at 38°47′19″N 80°33′59″W (38.788710 -80.566480). It is a part of the Little Kanawha River Valley watershed. Bulltown Historical District contains the Burnsville Lake Wildlife Management Area in which Bulltown sets. The district is a site of the American Civil War battle with seven Confederate graves and Union trenches with a Historic Center. The Weston-Gauley Bridge Turnpike Trail and the Bulltown public camping area sides this state lake in the park. The namesake is from the Delaware Native American 'Chief Bull'.

== Namesake ==
The house of Teedyuscung, King of the Delawares, at Wyoming, Pennsylvania was burned around him by white settlers on April 19, 1763. His son Captain Bull with a band of retaliating Delaware numbered about 135, some from the upper Ohio Valley of the earlier 1740s migration. They marauded through Pennsylvania and New York killing about 50 settlers. In 1763, Chief Bull was caught and jailed. The band was given an option that Chief Bull be hanged or the band move from the region. Bull was released to lead his people away. A monument to Chief Teedyuscung stands in Fairmount Park, Philadelphia. Chief Bull was known as 'Capt. Bull' also 'Honest John' and 'Brother Gideon'.

In 1763 this band arrived at Frederick Ice's settlement on Cheat River (Morgantown, West Virginia) Chief Bull and about 50 kindred had come from prison in the New York colony. They camped a few weeks there and then went up the Monongahela River into a temporary camp at now Fairmont, West Virginia. The following Spring they moved again, this time settling near present Bulltown, WVa along this watershed of Little Kanawha River. There they erected 20 cabins and a council house on the site now called Chief Bull's old camp. There they lived in peace with the pioneer settlers around the New River area until 1772 when a massacre legend becomes popular folklore. However, the following quote is historic documented, "The Delawares had a town on the little Kanawha, which Simon Kenton often visited. They went to the White River, 18 miles from the Wabash, & when Gen. Hamiliton was taken, they broke off & went to the Mississippi." Of these and colonial assimilation, there are still some descendants living in West Virginia.

== Bulltown Historic Area ==
The Bulltown Historic Area includes the 1863 battlefield of the Battle of Bulltown, a visitor center with exhibits about the town and the battle, and several 19th-century log homes and other structures. Most of the buildings were moved by the U.S. Army Corps of Engineers to the site when Burnsville Lake was created.

The Cunningham House and Outbuildings and Union Civil War Fortification were listed on the National Register of Historic Places in 1984.
