= Granny Smith (disambiguation) =

Granny Smith is a tip-bearing apple cultivar.

Granny Smith may also refer to:

- Maria Ann Smith, credited with producing the Granny Smith apple
- Granny Smith Festival, an annual festival held in Eastwood, New South Wales
- Granny Smith Gold Mine, a gold mine in Western Australia
- Granny Smith (My Little Pony), an animated fictional character from My Little Pony: Friendship Is Magic
- Granny Smith (Super Gran), a live action fictional character
- Granny Smith (video game), a 2012 video game developed by Mediocre AB
