= William Edgar Haymond House =

Historic house in West Virginia, United States

- U.S. National Register of Historic Places
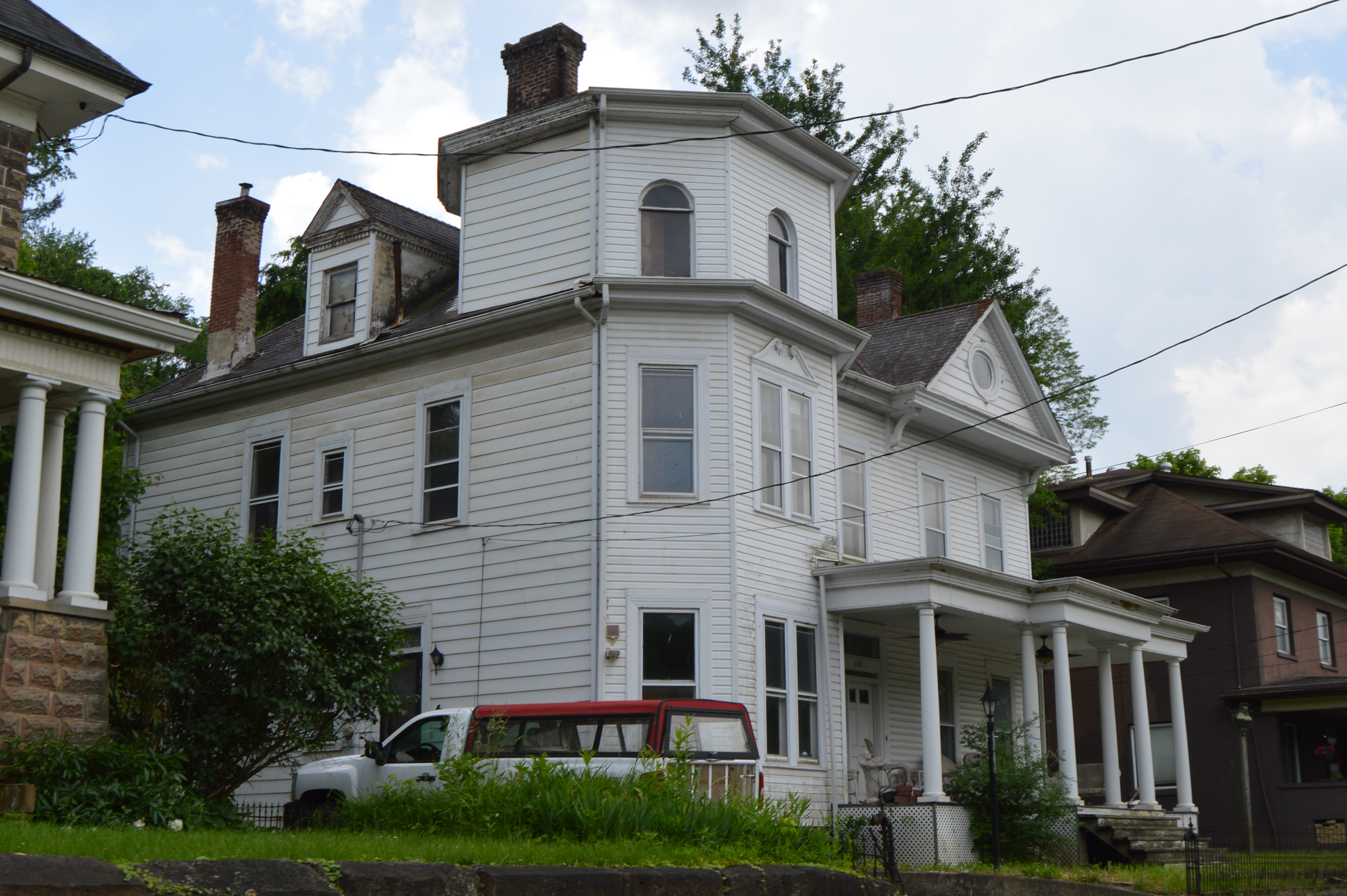
- Front and eastern side

- Location within West Virginia Location within the United States
- Location: 110 S. Stonewall St., Sutton, West Virginia
- Coordinates: 38°39′51″N 80°42′33″W
- Area: less than one acre
- Built: 1894
- Architect: Edward Bates Franzheim
- Architectural style: Queen Anne
- NRHP reference No.: 04000356
- Added to NRHP: April 21, 2004

William Edgar Haymond House is a historic home located at Sutton, Braxton County, West Virginia. It was designed in 1894, and is a 2 1/2-story wood-frame dwelling in the Queen Anne-style. It sits on a sandstone foundation and features a porch supported by four round Doric order columns. Also on the property is a garage dated to the 1920s.

It was listed on the National Register of Historic Places in 2006.
