= Gassaway station =

- Gassaway Depot
- U.S. National Register of Historic Places
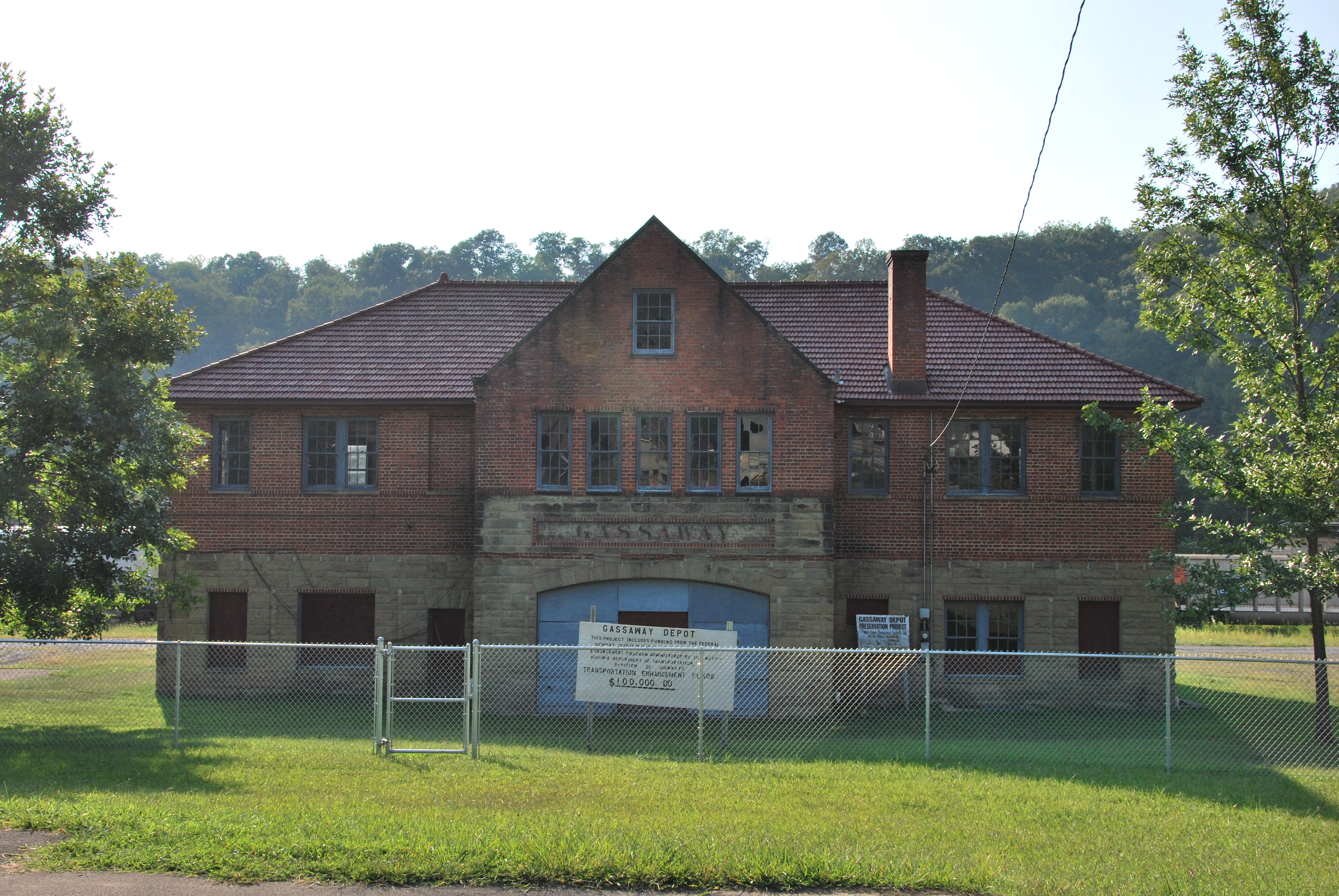
- Gassaway Depot in August 2010

- Location within West Virginia Location within the United States
- Location: Between 4th and 5th Sts., Gassaway, West Virginia
- Coordinates: 38°40′16″N 80°46′36″W
- Area: less than one acre
- Built: 1914
- Architectural style: Romanesque Revival
- NRHP reference No.: 94000215
- Added to NRHP: March 17, 1994

Gassaway station, also known as Coal & Coke Railway Company Depot, is a historic railway depot located at Gassaway, Braxton County, West Virginia. It was built in 1914, by the Coal and Coke Railway and later acquired by the Baltimore and Ohio Railroad. It is a two-story, brick and stone, Romanesque Revival-style building measuring 78 feet wide and 35 feet deep. It features two projecting pavilions, each 26 feet long and projecting 6 feet. It has a hipped roof with red ceramic "French tile." Passenger service ceased in 1953, and the depot continued use as a maintenance shop through 1988.

It was listed on the National Register of Historic Places in 1994 as the Gassaway Depot.
