= Armed & Delirious =

1997 video game

- Developer: Makh-Shevet
- Publisher: Sir-Tech
- Platform: Microsoft Windows
- Release: October 24, 1997
- Genre: Adventure

Armed & Delirious (released in Israel as Granix, in Germany as Granny and in other European countries as Dementia) is a 1997 adventure game developed by Makh-Shevet and published by Sir-Tech for Microsoft Windows. Upon release, Armed & Delirious received a generally negative reception. Reviewers praised the visual design of the game, but critiqued its plot, characters and dialog as nonsensical, found the game's humour limited, and encountered difficulty with its user interface, controls and puzzles.

== Gameplay ==
Players guide Granny (pictured right) through fourteen locations to solve puzzles and collect interactive objects.

Armed & Delirious is an adventure game played with point and click controls. The objective of the game is to travel across five planets across fourteen locations, and complete puzzles to assist Granny to recover her possessions and locate her family members. To progress in the game, the player must locate a number of objects, with interactable objects highlighted when pointed over. Players interact with the environment with four actions represented by a separate icon when hovering over an interactive item: to use an object, pull or drag an object, look at an object, or exit the area. Collected objects are stored in an inventory styled to appear as the inside of Granny's bra, which can be accessed with the tab key. Some puzzles are time-sensitive, requiring players to interact at the right point with another animated event in the scene.

== Plot ==
Players assume the role of Granny, an elderly woman and member of the Crotony family who lives in the attic. The Crotony family members enjoy performing cruel experiments on animals. One rabbit escapes the household, named the Great Rabbit, and founds an intergalactic empire, vowing revenge on the family. The Rabbit is able to convince George Crotony to sell his family members, and has taken Granny's cookbook in the process. Granny is tasked to save her family and retrieve her cookbook in the process, flying a spaceship in the form of a washing machine through several worlds in pursuit. Granny encounters a planet occupied by living plants, who intend to launch a attack on the Rabbit, who intends to turn them into soup using a recipe from Granny's book.

== Development ==
Armed & Delirious was developed by Makh-Shevet, an Israel-based company that entered the industry importing software and localising adventure games into Hebrew. It was the second full-length retail title from the studio following Master of Dimensions in 1996, both some of the earliest commercial adventure games from the country. Israeli magazine Wiz estimated the budget for the title was approximately $800,000. The game was showcased at E3 1997. Armed & Delirious was published in the United States by Sir-Tech Software, and was shipped on five CD-ROMs. The game was not as commercially successful as Master of Dimensions, and the company was sold to Media Plus in 1997.

== Reception ==
Reception

Review scores
Publication	Score
AllGame	2/5
Computer Games Strategy Plus	4.5/5
Computer Gaming World	1.5/5
Game Informer	8/10
GameRevolution	3.5/5
GameSpot	6/10
PC Gamer (US)	31%
PC Games (US)	D
PCMag	2/5

Several critics remarked that the game's premise and content was bizarre and surreal in nature, with Game Informer considering it featured "one of the strangest stories we've ever seen" and Computer Games Strategy Plus writing "the term 'surreal' barely scratches the surface in describing the total experience". The plot was also criticised as incoherent, with GameSpot finding it "only vaguely understandable" although "right for the tone of the game". Computer Gaming World questioned the players' motivations for assisting the characters, finding Granny "unpleasant, stupid and self-obsessed", and there being poor incentive to rescue her family of "animal torturers".

The surrealistic visual presentation and animation of Armed & Delirious was generally praised as a highlight of the game. Several compared the game's animations to that of Monty Python animator Terry Gilliam, and the work of Salvador Dali. PC Games wrote that the game featured "stunning production values" through its art direction and animation, and PC Gamer expressed the graphics look "so damn good" and were "perfectly integrated" through "dense graphic detail", realistic shadows, and "bouncy" animations.

Reviwers were divided on the game's humour: whilst some found it amusing, others considered the game was unfunny. Computer Gaming World wrote that the humour was "boring, repetitive, non-interactive and has nothing to do with gameplay", due to there being limited dialogue. Some reviewers that found the game humourless considered Granny and her voice acting funny. GameSpot felt the game was light-hearted and silly, but found it "too overburdened with unfunny nonsense", and as a result "blander than it thinks and certainly less clever and entertaining as it should have been".

Critics generally found the puzzles of Armed & Dangerous difficult to understand and solve, and worsened by the confusing nature of the game. Several critics expressed frustration with its user interface, which Computer Games Strategy Plus found "disorienting", and the controls, which PC Games stated made point and click selection "aggravating and confusing". Allgame wrote that the puzzles could be "far too incoherent and obscure to solve with any accuracy, and felt clues did not make sense; similarly, PC Gamer found the puzzles "stupid" and designed in a way that could soft lock the player from completing the game. Game Revolution considered there was "little direction" to help players understand where to go.
