= Granny's Creek =

Stream in the American state of West Virginia

Coordinates: 38°40′04″N 80°43′06″W

Granny's Creek is a stream in the U.S. state of West Virginia. It is a tributary of the Elk River.

Granny's Creek was named after an explorer's grandmother.

== See also ==
- List of rivers of West Virginia
