= Gassaway, West Virginia =

- Town
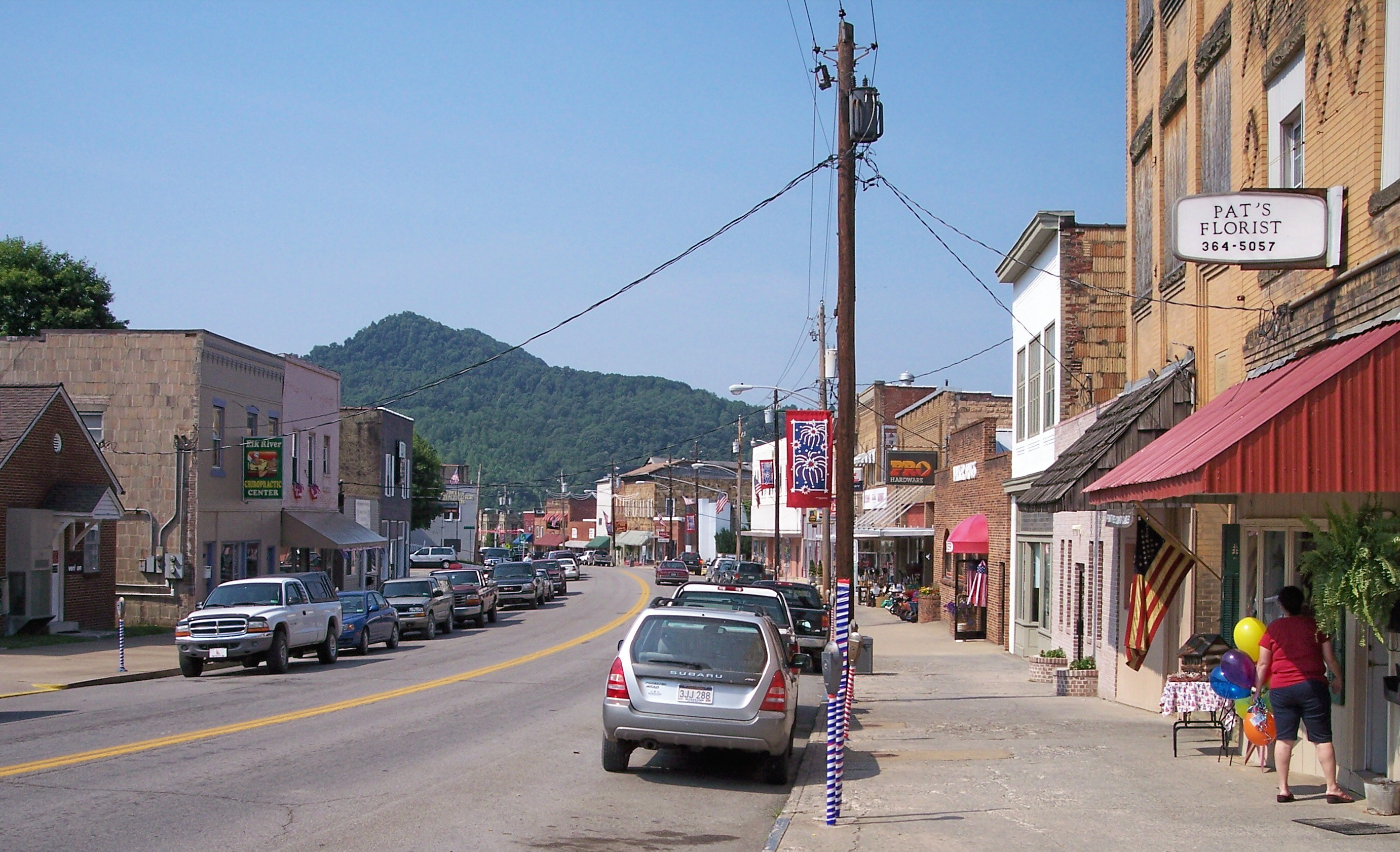
- Elk Street (West Virginia Route 4) in downtown Gassaway in 2007

- Flag

- Location of Gassaway in Braxton County, West Virginia.
- Coordinates: 38°40′15″N 80°46′13″W
- Country: United States
- State: West Virginia
- County: Braxton
- Mayor: Richard Roach

Government
  - Chief of Police: Aaron James

Area
  - Total: 1.22 sq mi (3.15 km^{2})
  - Land: 1.15 sq mi (2.99 km^{2})
  - Water: 0.062 sq mi (0.16 km^{2})
- Elevation: 860 ft (262 m)

Population (2020)
  - Total: 759
  - Estimate (2021): 755
  - Density: 732.4/sq mi (282.77/km^{2})
- Time zone: UTC-5 (Eastern (EST))
  - Summer (DST): UTC-4 (EDT)
- ZIP code: 26624
- Area code: 304
- FIPS code: 54-30220
- GNIS feature ID: 1539355
- Website: https://local.wv.gov/Gassaway/Pages/about.aspx

Gassaway is a town in Braxton County, West Virginia, United States. The population was 769 at the 2020 census. Gassaway was incorporated in 1905 and named for Henry Gassaway Davis, the Democratic Party's nominee for Vice President of the United States in 1904. The center of population of West Virginia is located approximately 7 miles (11 km) north of Gassaway.

== History ==
The town was originally created at the ends of two divisions of the Coal and Coke Railway, one originating in Charleston and the other originating in Elkins. Because of its central location, the area was an ideal place to build shops to facilitate the transition between the relatively flat Charleston division, which could operate with standard equipment, and the more hilly Elkins division of the Coal & Coke which required heavier engines. The town was laid out in 1904, and over the next decade, businesses and infrastructure such as hotels, a bank, stores, schools, a hospital, office buildings and churches appeared to serve the growing population. By 1915, the Coal & Coke Railway Company had completed work on a depot to facilitate passenger service to the town. The Gassaway Depot still stands today and was listed on the National Register of Historic Places in 1994.

== Geography ==
Gassaway is located at 38°40′15″N 80°46′13″W (38.670712, -80.770413), along the Elk River.

According to the United States Census Bureau, the town has a total area of 1.22 square miles (3.16 km^{2}), of which 1.16 square miles (3.00 km^{2}) is land and 0.06 square miles (0.16 km^{2}) is water.

=== Climate ===
The climate in this area is characterized by hot, humid summers and generally mild to freezing winters. According to the Köppen Climate Classification system, Gassaway has a humid subtropical climate, abbreviated "Cfa" on climate maps.

Climate data for Gassaway, West Virginia (1991–2020 normals, extremes 1951–present)
Month	Jan	Feb	Mar	Apr	May	Jun	Jul	Aug	Sep	Oct	Nov	Dec	Year
Record high °F (°C)	76 (24)	80 (27)	88 (31)	91 (33)	95 (35)	99 (37)	102 (39)	102 (39)	105 (41)	94 (34)	84 (29)	80 (27)	105 (41)
Mean maximum °F (°C)	66.6 (19.2)	69.5 (20.8)	76.8 (24.9)	85.4 (29.7)	87.8 (31.0)	90.2 (32.3)	92.2 (33.4)	91.4 (33.0)	89.5 (31.9)	83.8 (28.8)	77.1 (25.1)	68.4 (20.2)	93.2 (34.0)
Mean daily maximum °F (°C)	41.8 (5.4)	45.8 (7.7)	54.4 (12.4)	67.0 (19.4)	75.0 (23.9)	81.5 (27.5)	84.9 (29.4)	83.9 (28.8)	79.2 (26.2)	68.4 (20.2)	56.7 (13.7)	46.3 (7.9)	65.4 (18.6)
Daily mean °F (°C)	31.7 (−0.2)	34.8 (1.6)	42.2 (5.7)	53.6 (12.0)	62.9 (17.2)	70.6 (21.4)	74.5 (23.6)	73.4 (23.0)	67.5 (19.7)	55.6 (13.1)	44.4 (6.9)	36.5 (2.5)	54.0 (12.2)
Mean daily minimum °F (°C)	21.7 (−5.7)	23.8 (−4.6)	29.9 (−1.2)	40.2 (4.6)	50.9 (10.5)	59.6 (15.3)	64.2 (17.9)	62.8 (17.1)	55.9 (13.3)	42.8 (6.0)	32.0 (0.0)	26.6 (−3.0)	42.5 (5.8)
Mean minimum °F (°C)	1.9 (−16.7)	6.9 (−13.9)	15.7 (−9.1)	25.9 (−3.4)	35.6 (2.0)	47.4 (8.6)	55.1 (12.8)	53.9 (12.2)	43.7 (6.5)	30.2 (−1.0)	19.8 (−6.8)	11.8 (−11.2)	−0.8 (−18.2)
Record low °F (°C)	−22 (−30)	−14 (−26)	−3 (−19)	17 (−8)	25 (−4)	33 (1)	40 (4)	40 (4)	30 (−1)	14 (−10)	5 (−15)	−10 (−23)	−22 (−30)
Average precipitation inches (mm)	3.55 (90)	3.25 (83)	4.23 (107)	4.10 (104)	4.99 (127)	5.08 (129)	6.44 (164)	4.72 (120)	3.47 (88)	3.73 (95)	3.40 (86)	4.01 (102)	50.97 (1,295)
Average snowfall inches (cm)	5.4 (14)	4.1 (10)	3.3 (8.4)	0.2 (0.51)	0.0 (0.0)	0.0 (0.0)	0.0 (0.0)	0.0 (0.0)	0.0 (0.0)	0.0 (0.0)	0.8 (2.0)	3.5 (8.9)	17.3 (44)
Average precipitation days (≥ 0.01 in)	15.7	13.8	14.3	13.9	14.3	13.5	13.4	11.3	10.0	10.7	12.2	15.8	158.9
Average snowy days (≥ 0.1 in)	4.5	3.4	1.5	0.3	0.0	0.0	0.0	0.0	0.0	0.0	0.6	2.4	12.7
Source: NOAA

== Demographics ==
Historical population
Census	Pop.	Note	%±
1910	1,086		—
1920	1,518		39.8%
1930	1,618		6.6%
1940	1,429		−11.7%
1950	1,306		−8.6%
1960	1,223		−6.4%
1970	1,253		2.5%
1980	1,225		−2.2%
1990	946		−22.8%
2000	901		−4.8%
2010	908		0.8%
2020	759		−16.4%
2021 (est.)	755	▼	−0.5%
U.S. Decennial Census

=== 2010 census ===
As of the census of 2010, there were 908 people, 434 households, and 228 families living in the town. The population density was 782.8 inhabitants per square mile (302.2/km^{2}). There were 496 housing units at an average density of 427.6 per square mile (165.1/km^{2}). The racial makeup of the town was 98.6% White, 0.1% African American, 0.1% Native American, 0.3% Asian, and 0.9% from two or more races. Hispanic or Latino of any race were 0.1% of the population.

There were 434 households, of which 22.1% had children under the age of 18 living with them, 39.4% were married couples living together, 9.2% had a female householder with no husband present, 3.9% had a male householder with no wife present, and 47.5% were non-families. 41.0% of all households were made up of individuals, and 19.1% had someone living alone who was 65 years of age or older. The average household size was 2.09 and the average family size was 2.84.

The median age in the town was 44.5 years. 19.2% of residents were under the age of 18; 7.9% were between the ages of 18 and 24; 23.3% were from 25 to 44; 28.1% were from 45 to 64; and 21.4% were 65 years of age or older. The gender makeup of the town was 47.5% male and 52.5% female.

=== 2000 census ===
As of the census of 2000, there were 901 people, 420 households, and 243 families living in the town. The population density was 741.5 inhabitants per square mile (285.1/km^{2}). There were 506 housing units at an average density of 416.4 per square mile (160.1/km^{2}). The racial makeup of the town was 98.34% White, 0.55% African American, 0.55% Native American, 0.11% from other races, and 0.44% from two or more races. Hispanic or Latino of any race were 1.00% of the population.

There were 420 households, out of which 21.7% had children under the age of 18 living with them, 45.2% were married couples living together, 10.0% had a female householder with no husband present, and 42.1% were non-families. 38.8% of all households were made up of individuals, and 21.7% had someone living alone who was 65 years of age or older. The average household size was 2.15 and the average family size was 2.87.

In the town, the population dispersal was 20.0% under the age of 18, 6.5% from 18 to 24, 23.3% from 25 to 44, 25.0% from 45 to 64, and 25.2% who were 65 years of age or older. The median age was 45 years. For every 100 females, there were 82.4 males. For every 100 females age 18 and over, there were 79.8 males. The median income for a household in the town was $23,009, and the median income for a family was $31,667. Males had a median income of $28,125 versus $17,396 for females. The per capita income for the town was $15,965. About 10.8% of families and 13.9% of the population were below the poverty line, including 10.9% of those under age 18 and 16.9% of those age 65 or over.

== Notable people ==
- George Cogar, computer scientist; born in Gassaway
- Lonnie Thompson, paleoclimatologist; born in Gassaway
- Levi J. Dean, architect; born in Gassaway
