= Battle of Bulltown =

Battle of the American Civil War

- Part of the American Civil War
Date	October 13, 1863
Location	Braxton County, West Virginia 38°47′24″N 80°33′51″W
Result	Union victory

Belligerents
United States of America	Confederate States of America

Commanders and leaders
William Mattingly	William Lowther Jackson

Strength
Est. 400	Est. 800

Casualties and losses
a few minor wounds (including Mattingly)	8 killed, same number wounded

The Battle of Bulltown was a small skirmish fought during the American Civil War near Bulltown in Braxton County, West Virginia on October 13, 1863.

== Background ==
In the fall of 1863, William Lowther Jackson, the cousin of "Stonewall" Jackson, led a raiding party of 800 men into central West Virginia to capture the strategic "fort" at Bulltown which overlooked an important crossing of the Little Kanawha River. The goal was to cut Federal communications between the Greenbrier and Kanawha Valleys.

The Union garrison of roughly 400 men was commanded by Captain William Mattingly. The Union troops manned a "fort" of makeshift log barricades and shallow trenches which can still be seen today.

== Battle ==
Jackson approached Bulltown secretly. He divided his forces in an attempt to converge on the Union position from two different directions. The Confederates advanced at 4:30am on October 13. They quickly captured the Federal pickets but failed to take the main garrison by surprise.

The Confederates advanced against the fort and a drawn out skirmish lasted until about 4:30pm, almost twelve hours after the battle began. Twice, Jackson sent a flag of truce with a demand to surrender to Captain Simpson, asking him to surrender, but Simpson answered back that "he would fight them until Hell froze over, and if he had to retreat he would retreat on ice."

Jackson eventually retreated back towards the Greenbrier Valley. Casualties were very light considering the length of the battle. On the Union side there were no fatalities. Captain Mattingly was wounded in the thigh and there were some other slight wounds in the Federal camp. The Confederates suffered eight casualties and a like number wounded.

One civilian, Moses Cunningham, who owned the farm on which the majority of the battle took place, was wounded when he ran out of his house shouting "Hurrah for Jeff Davis."

== Aftermath ==
The battle was the last significant Confederate offensive in West Virginia and the Confederate goals of disrupting the Federal communications were thwarted.

== See also ==
- 1863 in West Virginia
- Burnsville Lake, a reservoir impounding the Little Kanawha River at Bulltown
- Union Civil War Fortification, listed on the National Register of Historic Places in 1984.

== Bibliography ==
- Hardway, Ronald V. On Our Own Soil: William Lowther Jackson and the Civil War in West Virginia's Mountains Quarrier Press. October 3, 2003, ISBN 978-1891852275
