= Burnsville Lake =

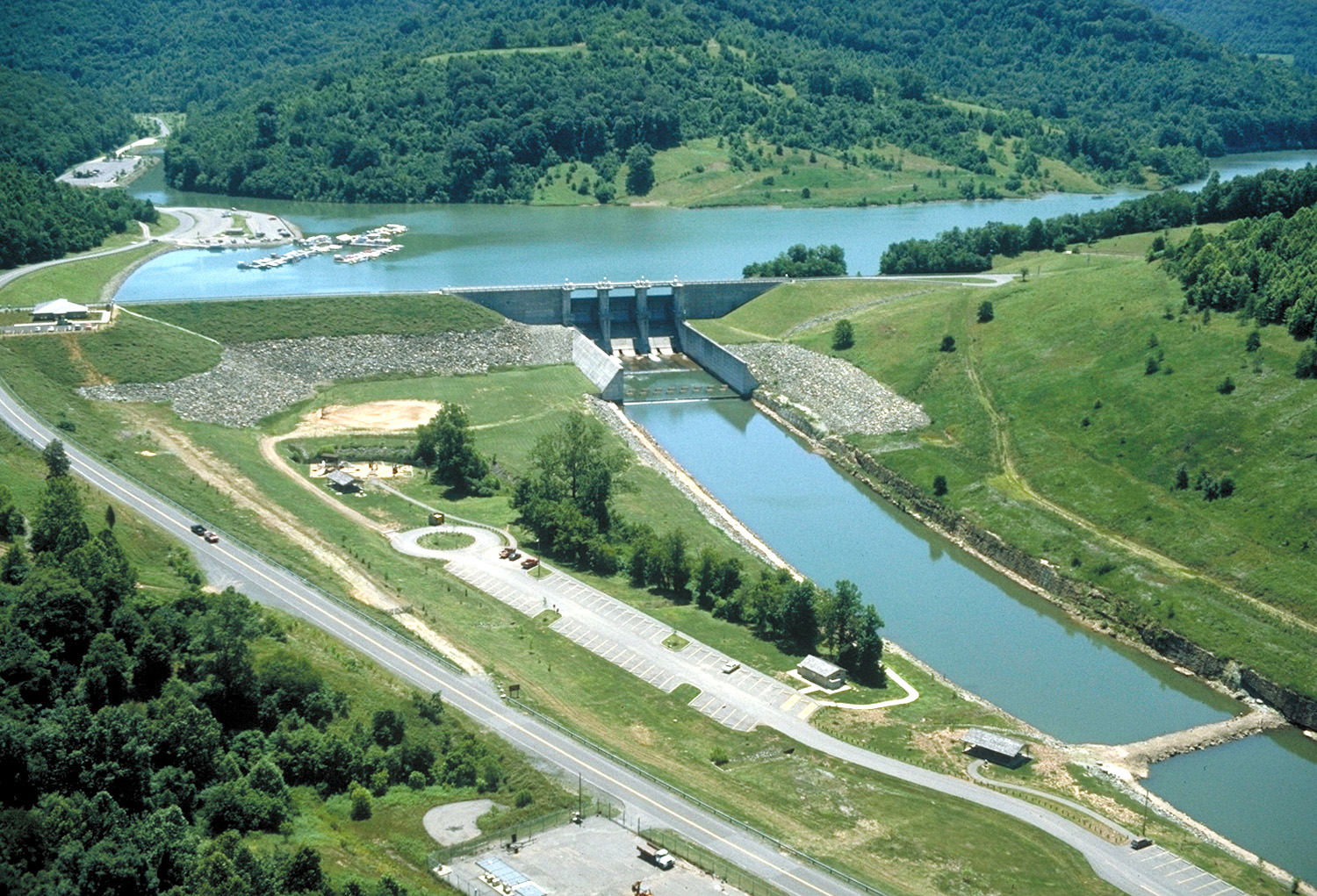
- Lake and Dam

- Location within West Virginia
- Location: Braxton County, West Virginia
- Coordinates: 38°50′24″N 80°37′05″W
- Lake type: reservoir
- Primary inflows: Little Kanawha River
- Primary outflows: Little Kanawha River
- Catchment area: 165 sq mi (430 km^{2})
- Basin countries: United States
- Surface elevation: 784 feet (239 m)

Burnsville Lake is both a recreational and flood control reservoir on Little Kanawha River located southeast of Burnsville in Braxton County, in the U.S. state of West Virginia. Burnsville Lake was authorized by the U.S. Congress in the Flood Control Act of 1938.

Construction of the Burnsville Lake project was begun in the summer of 1972 and the dam was completed in September 1976. The lake project controls the runoff from a drainage area of 165 square miles (427 km^{2}). The dam is a rock-fill embankment dam rising 84.5 feet (25.8 m) above the streambed. Top elevation is 839 feet (256 m) above sea level, and the crest length is 1,400 feet (430 m). A gated spillway is located in the left abutment. The outlet works are located in the spillway section. The minimum pool is maintained at elevation 776 feet (237 m) with a surface area of 550 acres (223 ha). The summer pool is at elevation 789 feet (240 m) and has a surface area of 968 acres (392 ha). The flood control pool is at elevation 825 feet (251 m) with a surface area of 1,900 acres (769 ha).

Many people in Burnsville and surrounding communities opposed the building of the dam since the back waters would flood areas that were at the time occupied and locations of ancestral homes. Cemeteries had to be moved and residents had to relocate. When the dam was built, there was no recreation area for local residents, with residents of Burnsville having to travel to Bulltown instead.

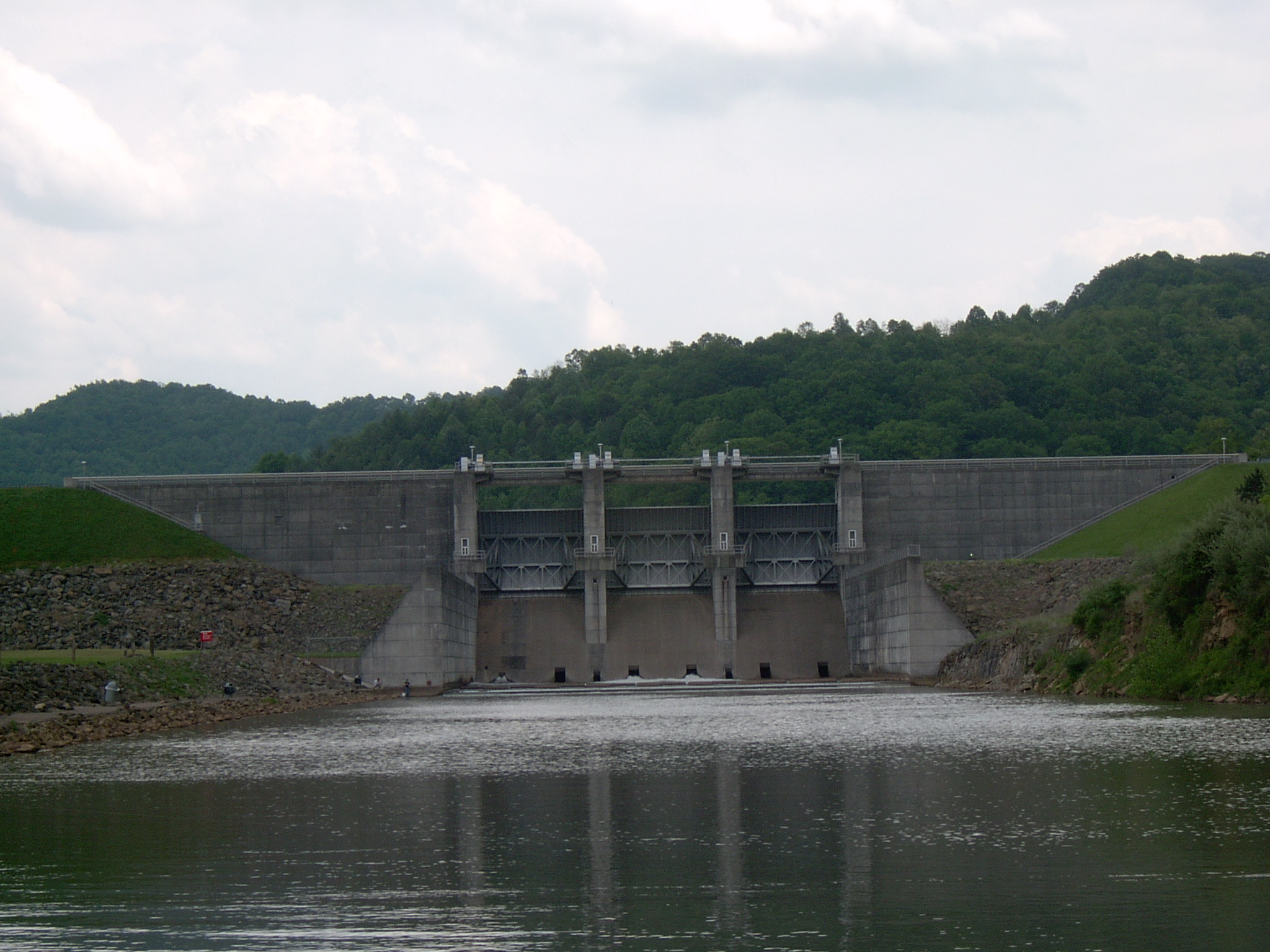
Burnsville Dam on the Little Kanawha River in 2004.

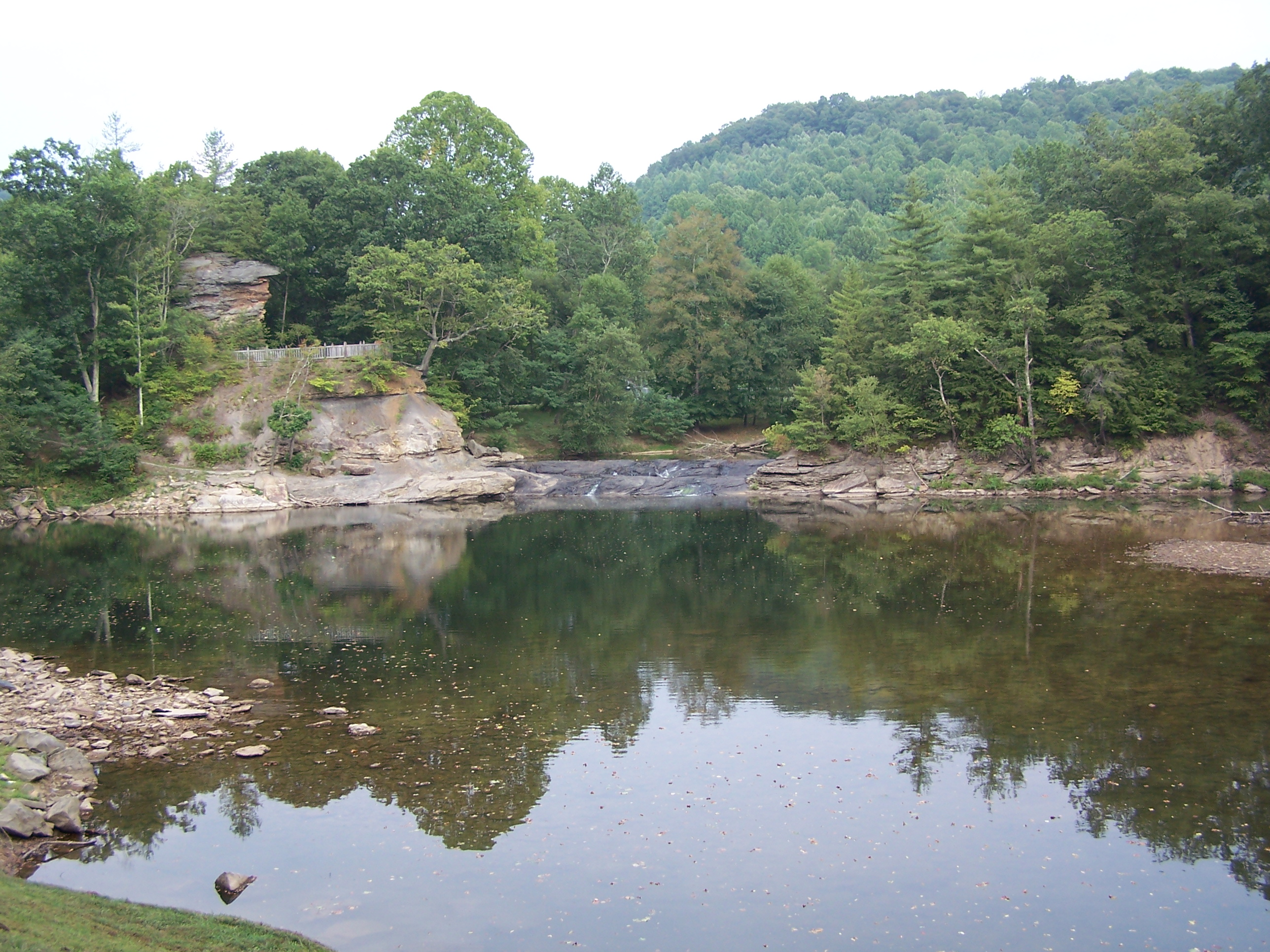
Falls Mill area, the upstream end of Burnsville Lake at its normal pool elevation.

== See also ==
- Battle of Bulltown, a Civil War skirmish near the upstream end of the lake
- List of lakes of West Virginia
