= List of museums in West Virginia =

This list of museums in West Virginia encompasses museums defined for this context as institutions (including nonprofit organizations, government entities, and private businesses) that collect and care for objects of cultural, artistic, scientific, or historical interest and make their collections or related exhibits available for public viewing. Museums that exist only in cyberspace (i.e., virtual museums) are not included.

== Museums ==
Name	Town/City	County	Region	Type	Summary
Adaland Mansion	Philippi	Barbour	Mountaineer Country	Historic house	1870 period mansion
Adam Stephen House	Martinsburg	Berkeley	Eastern Panhandle	Historic house	Also known as General Adam Stephen House, located next to Triple Brick Museum
African-American Heritage Family Museum	Ansted	Fayette	New River/Greenbier River Valleys	African American	
Alexander Campbell Mansion	Bethany	Brooke	Northern Panhandle	Historic house	Operated by Bethany College, early 19th-century period home of college founder Alexander Campbell
Anna Jarvis Birthplace Museum	Webster	Taylor	Mountaineer Country	Historic house	Home of Anna Jarvis, founder of the Mother's Day holiday
Ansted Culture and Heritage Museum	Ansted	Fayette	New River/Greenbier River Valleys	Local history	information
Antioch Baptist Church Museum	Ansted	Fayette	New River/Greenbier River Valleys	Local history	information
Art Museum of West Virginia University	Morgantown	Monongalia	Mountaineer Country	Art	website, part of West Virginia University
The Arts Centre	Martinsburg	Berkeley	Eastern Panhandle	Art	website, includes exhibit gallery
Avampato Discovery Museum	Charleston	Kanawha	Metro Valley	Science	Part of the Clay Center for the Arts & Sciences of West Virginia, science exhibits, art gallery and a planetarium
Babcock State Park	Clifftop	Fayette	New River/Greenbier River Valleys	Mill	Includes Glades Creek Grist Mill
B & O Museum of Wheeling	Wheeling	Ohio	Northern Panhandle	Multiple	website, part of West Virginia Northern Community College, exhibits include B & O Railroad memorabilia, Hazel-Atlas Glass Company pieces; also known as West Virginia Northern Community College Alumni Association Museum
Barbour County Historical Museum	Philippi	Barbour	Mountaineer Country	Local history	Exhibits include the mummified bodies of two female asylum inmates that were artificially preserved in 1888
Beauchamp-Newman Museum	Elizabeth	Wirt	Mid-Ohio Valley	Local history	Owned and operated by the Elizabeth Beauchamp Chapter Daughters of American Pioneers
Beckley Exhibition Mine	Beckley	Raleigh	New River/Greenbier River Valleys	Mining	Coal mine town, mine and museum, also Youth Museum of Southern WV
Belle Boyd House	Martinsburg	Berkeley	Eastern Panhandle	Local history	website, operated by the Berkeley County Historical Society, family home of Civil War spy Belle Boyd
Beverly Heritage Center	Beverly	Randolph	Potomac Highlands	Local history	website, combines four historic buildings to tell the story of the Battle of Rich Mountain, the Staunton and Parkersburg Turnpike, and daily life in a 19th-century rural county seat
Bice-Ferguson Memorial Museum	Shinnston	Harrison	Mountaineer Country	Local history	website, exhibits include period room displays and antique telephones
Birke Art Gallery	Huntington	Cabell	Metro Valley	Art	website, part of Marshall University
Blenko Glass Visitor Center and Museum	Milton	Cabell	Metro Valley	Decorative arts	Visitor center includes museum
Blennerhassett Island Historical State Park	Parkersburg	Wood	Mid-Ohio Valley	Local history	Includes Blennerhassett Museum of Regional History and rebuilt early 19th-century Blennerhassett Mansion on the island
Brooke County Historical Museum	Wellsburg	Brooke	Northern Panhandle	Local history	Industry, early education and pioneer life
Bulltown Historic Area	Bulltown	Braxton	Mountain Lakes	Military	Includes the 1863 battlefield of the Battle of Bulltown, a visitor center with exhibits about the town and the battle, and several 19th-century log homes and other structures
Caboose Museum	Mullens	Wyoming	Southern	Local history	
Campbell-Flannagan-Murrell House Museum	Hinton	Summers	New River/Greenbier River Valleys	Historic house	website
Canyon Rim Visitor Center	Fayetteville	Fayette	New River/Greenbier River Valleys	Local history	website, one of three visitor centers for New River Gorge National River, area cultural and natural history
Capon Bridge Museum	Capon Bridge	Hampshire	Potomac Highlands	Local history	website, information
Carnegie Hall, Inc.	Lewisburg	Greenbrier	New River/Greenbier River Valleys	Art	Regional cultural center with three fine art exhibit galleries
Carnifex Ferry Battlefield State Park	Summersville	Nicholas	Mountain Lakes	Historic house	1850s Patterson House Museum includes artifacts from the Battle of Carnifex Ferry
Cass Scenic Railroad State Park	Cass	Pocahontas	Potomac Highlands	Railroad	Includes heritage railroad, museum, train shops, recreated 1940s logging camp, model railroads
Cedar Creek State Park	Glenville	Gilmer	Mountain Lakes	School	Includes the Pine Run One Room School
Central West Virginia Genealogy and History Library and Museum	Weston	Lewis	Mountain Lakes	History	
Ceredo Museum	Ceredo	Wayne	Metro Valley	Local history	Facebook site, information, operated by the Ceredo Historical Society
Chief Logan State Park	Logan	Logan	Metro Valley	Multiple	Includes Museum in the Park with changing art and history exhibits
Children's Museum of the Ohio Valley	Wheeling	Ohio	Northern Panhandle	Children's	website
Clarksburg History Museum	Clarksburg	Harrison	Mountaineer Country	History	Official website
C & O Depot Museum	St. Albans	Kanawha	Metro Valley	Railroad	
Coal Heritage Museum	Madison	Boone	Metro Valley	Mining	website, operated by the Bituminous Coal Heritage Foundation, heritage of area coal fields industry
Coal Heritage Trail Interpretive Center	Bramwell	Mercer	New River/Greenbier River Valleys	Mining	information, West Virginia’s coal history
Contentment Historical Complex	Ansted	Fayette	New River/Greenbier River Valleys	Historic house	Mid-19th-century period home of Civil War Col. George Imboden, schoolhouse, museum of historic household and cultural artifacts
Cook-Hayman Pharmacy Museum	Morgantown	Monongalia	Mountaineer Country	Medical	website, part of West Virginia University Medical Center, historic pharmacy display open by appointment
Country Store and Museum	Glenville	Gilmer	Mountain Lakes	History	General store with antiques and historic shop items
Craik-Patton House	Charleston	Kanawha	Metro Valley	Historic house	Mid-19th-century period home operated by the Colonial Dames of America in the state of West Virginia
Daughters of the American Revolution Toll House Museum	Barboursville	Cabell	Metro Valley	Local history	website
Davis History House	Romney	Hampshire	Potomac Highlands	Historic house	information, operated by the Hampshire County Public Library, 19th-century log house
Daywood Gallery	Philippi	Barbour	Mountaineer Country	Art	website, part of Alderson-Broaddus College
Doddridge County Museum	West Union	Doddridge	Mountaineer Country	Local history	Facebook site
Droop Mountain Battlefield State Park	Hillsboro	Pocahontas	Potomac Highlands	Military	Includes museum with history and artifacts from the American Civil War battle fought at the site
Eckhart House	Wheeling	Ohio	Northern Panhandle	Historic house	website, Victorian period house and tea room
Fenton Art Glass Museum	Williamstown	Wood	Mid-Ohio Valley	Art	website
Fort Ashby	Fort Ashby	Mineral	Potomac Highlands	Military	Mid-18th-century stockade fort erected by order of Col. George Washington during the French and Indian War
Fort Edwards	Capon Bridge	Hampshire	Potomac Highlands	History	website, visitor center museum exhibits about the 18th-century frontier fort and the French and Indian War
Fort New Salem	Salem	Harrison	Mountaineer Country	Open air	19th-century log structures
Fort Randolph	Point Pleasant	Mason	Metro Valley	Military	Reconstructed American Revolutionary War era fort
Fostoria Glass Museum	Moundsville	Marshall	Northern Panhandle	Decorative arts	website, pieces produced by the Fostoria Glass Company
Gauley Bridge Historical Museum	Gauley Bridge	Fayette	New River/Greenbier River Valleys	Local history	information, scroll to listing
Gorby's Vintage Instrument Museum	South Charleston	Kanawha	Metro Valley	Music	information, open by appointment, includes rare and exotic string, woodwind, brass and other instruments
Graham House	Lowell	Summers	New River/Greenbier River Valleys	Historic house	18th-century house, includes Saunders One Room School House Museum
Greatest Generation Exhibit	Rowlesburg	Preston	Mountaineer Country	Military	website, World War II memorabilia and home life
Green Bank Science Center	Green Bank	Pocahontas	Potomac Highlands	Science	website, interactive science exhibits and tours of the Green Bank Telescope
The Greenbrier - The Bunker	White Sulphur Springs	Greenbrier	New River/Greenbier River Valleys	Military	1950s secret emergency relocation center
The Greenbrier - Presidents' Cottage Museum	White Sulphur Springs	Greenbrier	New River/Greenbier River Valleys	History	History of the Greenbrier and its presidential visitors
Greenbrier Military School Memorial Museum	Lewisburg	Greenbrier	New River/Greenbier River Valleys	Military	information, history of the defunct Greenbrier Military School
Grave Creek Mound	Moundsville	Marshall	Northern Panhandle	Archaeology	Includes the Delf Norona Museum with artifacts from the prehistoric mound
Hamilton Round Barn	Mannington	Marion	Mountaineer Country	Farm	
Hancock County Museum	New Cumberland	Hancock	Northern Panhandle	Historic house	Victorian period house and display of local history
Harpers Ferry National Historical Park	Harpers Ferry	Jefferson	Eastern Panhandle	Multiple	Includes many museums and historic sites
General Thomas M. Harris School Museum	Harrisville	Ritchie	Mid Ohio Valley	Local history	Operated by the Ritchie County Historical Society
Henry Cooper Log Cabin Museum	Parkersburg	Wood	Mid-Ohio Valley	History	Pioneer relics
Heritage Farm Museum and Village	Huntington	Wayne	Metro Valley	Open-air	Includes Museum of Progress with home displays from 1850, 1900, to 1925, transportation museum and country store museum
Hinton Railroad Museum	Hinton	Summers	New River/Greenbier River Valleys	Railroad	Facebook site
Historic Shepherdstown Museum	Shepherdstown	Jefferson	Eastern Panhandle	Local history	
History House Museum	Terra Alta	Preston	Mountaineer Country	Local history	Operated by the Preston County Historical Society
Huntington Museum of Art	Huntington	Cabell	Metro Valley	Art	
Huntington Railroad Museum	Huntington	Cabell	Metro Valley	Railroad	website, operated by the Collis P. Huntington Railroad Historical Society
International Mother's Day Shrine	Grafton	Taylor	Mountaineer Country	History	
Jackson's Mill	Weston	Lewis	Mountain Lakes	Open air	Includes Jackson Family Mill Museum, Blaker Grist Mill, McWhorter Cabin, Mountain State Heritage Center and Mary Conrad Cabin
Jefferson County Museum	Charles Town	Jefferson	Eastern Panhandle	Local history	website
Jenkins Plantation Museum	Lesage	Cabell	Metro Valley	Historic house	Home of Confederate Brigadier General Albert Gallatin Jenkins
John Brown Wax Museum	Harpers Ferry	Jefferson	Eastern Panhandle	Wax	website
Kruger Street Toy & Train Museum	Wheeling	Ohio	Northern Panhandle	Toy	website, includes toys, model trains, and a scale model of downtown Wheeling
Lighthorse Harry Lee Cabin	Mathias	Hardy	Potomac Highlands	Local history	Property administered by the State of West Virginia in Lost River State Park
Lemuel Chenoweth House & Museum	Beverly	Randolph	Mountaineer Country	Historic house	Mid-19th-century period house
Lost River Artisans Cooperative and Museum	Lost River	Hardy	Eastern Panhandle	Local history	website, includes furniture, tools, textiles, photographs
Lost World Caverns	Lewisburg	Greenbrier	New River/Greenbier River Valleys	Natural history	Includes cave tours and museum with fossils, rocks and minerals
Madie Carroll House	Huntington	Cabell	Metro Valley	Historic house	19th-century period house
Mansion House Museum	Point Pleasant	Mason	Metro Valley	Historic house	Located in Tu-Endie-Wei State Park
Marion County Historical Museum	Fairmont	Marion	Mountaineer Country	Local history	website
Marshall County Historical Society Museum	Moundsville	Marshall	Northern Panhandle	Local history	information
Matewan Depot Replica Museum	Matewan	Mingo	Metro Valley	Local history	Facebook site
Mercer County War Museum	Princeton	Mercer	New River/Greenbier River Valleys	Military	Also known as Those Who Served Museum
Mesaros Galleries	Morgantown	Monongalia	Mountaineer Country	Art	website, part of West Virginia University
Monongalia Arts Center	Morgantown	Monongalia	Mountaineer Country	Art	Art and culture center with two galleries
Monroe County Historical Society Museum	Union	Monroe	New River/Greenbier River Valleys	Local history	website
Morgan’s Kitchen Plantation Museum	St. Albans	Kanawha	Metro Valley	Historic house	website, operated in the summer by the St. Albans Historical Society
Morgantown History Museum	Morgantown	Monongalia	Mountaineer Country	Local history	website
Mothman Museum	Point Pleasant	Mason	Metro Valley	Media	website, museum about the book and movie The Mothman Prophecies
Mountaineer Military Museum	Weston	Lewis	Mountain Lakes	Military	website
Museum of American Glass in West Virginia	Weston	Lewis	Mountain Lakes	Art	website, decorative glass pieces created by area glass manufacturers, includes National Marble Museum
Museum of Radio and Technology	Huntington	Cabell	Metro Valley	Technology	Historic radios and equipment
Museum of the Berkeley Springs	Berkeley Springs	Morgan	Eastern Panhandle	Local history	Located in Berkeley Springs State Park
Museums of Oglebay Institute	Wheeling	Ohio	Northern Panhandle	Multiple	Mansion Museum - 1900 mansion with decorative furnishings and local history exhibits, and the Glass Museum with Wheeling glass and china
New Deal Homestead Museum	Arthurdale	Preston	Mountaineer Country	Multiple	website, local history of this Depression-era project, period displays, art
New Era School Museum	Mineral Wells	Wood	Mid-Ohio Valley	School	Facebook site, 1884 one room school
North House Museum	Lewisburg	Greenbrier	New River/Greenbier River Valleys	Historic house	Operated by the Greenbrier Historical Society, decorative arts and local history
Oglebay Institute’s Stifel Fine Arts Center	Wheeling	Ohio	Northern Panhandle	Art	Performing and visual arts center
Oil & Gas Museum	Parkersburg	Wood	Mid-Ohio Valley	Industry	Oil and gas industry in West Virginia and Ohio
Old Hemlock	Brandonville	Preston	Mountaineer Country	Historic house	1782 log house and nature preserve, open for events and by appointment
Old Mill at Harman	Harman	Randolph	Potomac Highlands	Mill	Working grist mill
Old Morgantown Glass Collectors' Guild Glass Museum	Morgantown	Monongalia	Mountaineer Country	Art	website, decorative glass pieces, currently rebuilding the museum
Old Stone House Museum	Pennsboro	Ritchie	Mid-Ohio Valley	Local history	Operated by the Ritchie County Historical Society
Parkersburg Art Center	Parkersburg	Wood	Mid-Ohio Valley	Art	website
Pearl S. Buck Birthplace	Hillsboro	Pocahontas	Potomac Highlands	Biographical	1892 period home of writer Pearl S. Buck
Pennsboro B&O Depot	Pennsboro	Ritchie	Mid-Ohio Valley	Railroad	Operated by the Ritchie County Historical Society
Pocahontas County Museum	Marlinton	Pocahontas	Potomac Highlands	Local history	Operated by the Pocahontas County Historical Society
Point Pleasant River Museum	Point Pleasant	Mason	Metro Valley	Maritime	website, river life and commercial enterprise on the Ohio and Kanawha Rivers, including great floods, boat construction, sternwheel steamers, river disasters, river industry, contribution to World War II, a full scale pilot house simulator, 2400 GAL native fish aquarium and a research library
West Virginia Mine Wars Museum	Matewan	Mingo		History	
Prabhupada's Palace of Gold	New Vrindaban	Marshall	Northern Panhandle	Religious	Memorial shrine built by Hare Krishna devotees for their spiritual master, A. C. Bhaktivedanta Swami Prabhupada
Prickett's Fort State Park	Fairmont	Marion	Mountaineer Country	Living	Reconstructed 1770s log fort with seasonal 18th-century living history demonstrations and the 19th-century Job Prickett House
Princeton Railroad Museum	Princeton	Mercer	New River/Greenbier River Valleys	Railroad	website, over 100 railroad lanterns, exhibits of railroad artifacts, artworks, books, photographs, and corporate railroad material
Raleigh County Veterans Museum	Beckley	Raleigh	New River/Greenbier River Valleys	Military	Facebook site
Randolph County Museum	Beverly	Randolph	Potomac Highlands	Local history	1828 store housing a collection that includes early settlement tools, Civil War artifacts, and belongings of early citizens
Rehoboth Church and Museum	Union	Monroe	New River/Greenbier River Valleys	Religious	1780s log-cabin style church and adjacent museum, heritage landmark of the United Methodist Church
Rowlesburg B&O Depot and Museum	Rowlesburg	Preston	Mountaineer Country	Railroad	information
Royce J. and Caroline B. Watts Museum	Morgantown	Monongalia	Mountaineer Country	Industry	Part of West Virginia University, social, cultural, and technological history of the coal, oil, and natural gas industries of West Virginia
St. George Academy	St. George	Tucker	Mountaineer Country	Local history	listed on the National Register of Historic Places
Samuel Shrewsbury, Sr. House	Belle	Kanawha	Metro Valley	Historic house	Owned by the Belle Historical Restoration Society, Inc., early 19th-century period house and local history museum
Sandstone Visitor Center	Sandstone	Summers	Southern	Local history	website, one of three visitor centers for New River Gorge National River, area cultural and natural history of the river and its watershed
Scott's Run Museum	Osage	Monongalia	Mountaineer Country	Local history	website, information
Seneca Rocks Discovery Center	Seneca Rocks	Pendleton	Eastern Panhandle	Multiple	website, operated by the US Forest Service in Spruce Knob–Seneca Rocks National Recreation Area, exhibits on natural and local history, includes the mid-19th-century period Sites Homestead
South Charleston Museum	South Charleston	Kanawha	Metro Valley	Multiple	Facebook site, local history, culture and art exhibits
Swiger Run History Center & Museum	Doddridge County	Doddridge	Mountaineer Country	Local history	website
Taggart Hall Civil War Museum	Romney	Hampshire	Potomac Highlands	Local history	Includes Civil War memorabilia and Fenton glass
Thurmond Depot Visitor Center	Thurmond	Fayette	Southern	Local history	One of three visitor centers for New River Gorge National River
Top Kick's Military Museum	Petersburg	Grant	Potomac Highlands	Military	website
Triple Brick Museum	Martinsburg	Berkeley	Eastern Panhandle	Local history	website, located next to Adam Stephen House
Twin Falls Resort State Park	Mullens	Wyoming	New River/Greenbier River Valleys	Farm	Includes a nature center and Bowers Ridge Pioneer Farm, a restored 1830s mountain homestead working farm
Tyler County Museum	Middlebourne	Tyler	Northern Panhandle	Local history	website, operated by the Tyler County Heritage and Historical Society
Upshur County History Center	Buckhannon	Upshur	Mountain Lakes	Local history	website, operated by the Upshur County Historical Society
US Navy Poster Museum	Point Pleasant	Mason	Metro Valley	Art	Facebook site, US Navy recruiting posters spanning 100 years
Veterans Museum of Mid Ohio Valley	Parkersburg	Wood	Mid-Ohio Valley	Military	website
Veterans Museum of Southern West Virginia	Hinton	Summers	New River/Greenbier River Valleys	Military	information
Victorian Wheeling Landmarks Foundation	Wheeling	Ohio	Northern Panhandle	Historic house	information, provides guided tours of the Victorian period Hess House, John List House and Hazlett-Fields House
Watters Smith Memorial State Park	Lost Creek	Harrison	Mountaineer Country	Farm	Late 19th-century homestead and farm museum
Weirton Area Museum and Cultural Center	Weirton	Hancock	Northern Panhandle	Local history	website
West Augusta Historical Society Museum	Mannington	Marion	Mountaineer Country	Local history	
West Virginia CCC Museum	Quiet Dell	Harrison	Mountaineer Country	History	website, history of the Civilian Conservation Corps activities in WV
West Virginia Governor's Mansion	Charleston	Kanawha	Metro Valley	Historic house	
West Virginia Independence Hall	Wheeling	Ohio	Northern Panhandle	History	History of statehood of West Virginia
West Virginia Railroad Museum	Elkins	Randolph	Potomac Highlands	Railway	Heritage railroad and museum being planned
West Virginia State Capitol	Charleston	Kanawha	Metro Valley	History	
West Virginia State Cultural Center	Charleston	Kanawha	Metro Valley	Multiple	website, includes West Virginia's artistic, cultural and historic heritage
West Virginia State Farm Museum	Point Pleasant	Mason	Metro Valley	Farm	website, buildings of historical value, log cabins and tools, early farmhouse and furnishing, machinery, an operational 19th-century blacksmith shop, turn-of-the-20th-century doctor's and newspaper offices
West Virginia State Museum	Charleston	Kanawha	Metro Valley	Multiple	website, West Virginia history, culture, art, paleontology, archaeology and geology
West Virginia State Penitentiary	Moundsville	Marshall	Northern Panhandle	Prison	Former prison
Wheeling Artisan Center	Wheeling	Ohio	Northern Panhandle	Multiple	website, includes Wymer's General Store Museum, art gallery and local history exhibits
Whipple Company Store & Museum	Scarbro	Fayette	Southern	History	website, historic coal camp company store
Wildwood House Museum	Beckley	Raleigh	New River/Greenbier River Valleys	History	Historic house museum
Williamson Area Railroad Museum	Williamson	Mingo	Metro Valley	Railroad	information
Wyoming County Historical Museum	Oceana	Wyoming	Southern	Local history	website
Youth Museum of Southern West Virginia	Beckley	Raleigh	New River/Greenbier River Valleys	Children's	website, part of Beckley Exhibition Mine
Z. D. Ramsdell House	Ceredo	Wayne	Metro Valley	Historic house	19th-century house
Flatwoods Monster Museum	Sutton	Braxton	Mountain Lakes	Local History	Website
WV Bigfoot Museum	Sutton	Braxton	Mountain Lakes	State History	Website

== Defunct museums ==
- Buddy's Country Store & Museum, Bluewell, historic coal camp company store, closed in 2014 and contents auctioned
- Grafton B & O Railroad Heritage Center, Grafton
- Marx Toy Museum, Moundsville, closed in 2016

== Regions defined ==
The West Virginia Association of Museums has defined the following tourism regions of West Virginia:

=== Eastern Panhandle ===
Counties: Berkeley, Jefferson, Morgan

=== Potomac Highlands ===
Counties: Grant, Hampshire, Hardy, Mineral, Pendleton, Pocahontas, Randolph, Tucker

=== North-Central West Virginia ===
Counties: Barbour, Doddridge, Harrison, Marion, Monongalia, Preston, Taylor

=== Northern Panhandle ===
Region includes Wheeling and Moundsville. Counties: Brooke, Hancock, Marshall, Ohio, Tyler, Wetzel

=== Mountain Lakes ===
Counties: Braxton, Clay, Gilmer, Lewis, Nicholas, Upshur, Webster

=== Metro Valley ===
Region centered on Charleston and Huntington. Counties: Boone, Cabell, Kanawha, Lincoln, Logan, Mason, Mingo, Putnam, Wayne

=== Mid-Ohio Valley ===
Counties: Calhoun, Jackson, Pleasants, Ritchie, Roane, Wirt, Wood

=== New River/Greenbrier River Valleys ===
Includes most counties in Southern West Virginia. Counties: Fayette, Greenbrier, Mercer, Monroe, Raleigh, Summers, Wyoming

== See also ==
- List of museums in Huntington, West Virginia
- Botanical gardens in West Virginia (category)
- Observatories in West Virginia (category)
- Nature Centers in West Virginia
- List of museums in the United States
