= Rosedale =

Rosedale may refer to:

== Places ==
=== Australia ===
- Rosedale, New South Wales, a settlement
- Rosedale, Queensland, a town
- Rosedale, South Australia, a town
- Rosedale, Victoria, a town
- Shire of Rosedale, Victoria, a former local government area

=== Canada ===
- Rosedale, Alberta, a community
- Rosedale, Calgary, Alberta, a residential neighborhood
- Rosedale, Chilliwack, British Columbia, a community
- Rural Municipality of Rosedale No. 283, Saskatchewan
- Rural Municipality of Rosedale, Manitoba
- Rosedale, Ontario
- Rosedale, Toronto, Ontario
  - Rosedale (electoral district)
- Rosedale River, Ontario

=== New Zealand ===
- Rosedale, Auckland, a suburb
- Rosedale, Invercargill, a suburb

=== United Kingdom ===
- Rosedale, Cheshunt
- Rosedale, North Yorkshire, a valley
- A distinct locality also in North Yorkshire, later renamed as Port Mulgrave

=== Communities ===
- Rosedale, California, a census-designated place
- Rosedale, Colorado, a former municipality
- Rosedale Township, Jersey County, Illinois
- Rosedale, Illinois, an unincorporated community
- Rosedale, Indiana, a town
- Rosedale, Kansas, a community
- Rosedale, Louisiana, a village
- Rosedale, Maryland, an unincorporated community and census-designated place
- Rosedale Township, Mahnomen County, Minnesota
- Rosedale, Michigan, an unincorporated community
- Rosedale, Mississippi, a city
- Rosedale, Nebraska, a ghost town
- Rosedale, Hammonton, New Jersey, an unincorporated community
- Rosedale, Mercer County, New Jersey
- Rosedale, New Mexico, a census-designated place
- Rosedale, Ohio, an unincorporated community
- Rosedale, Defiance County, Ohio, an unincorporated community
- Rosedale, Oklahoma, a town
- Rosedale, Oregon, an unincorporated community
- Rosedale, Virginia, an unincorporated community
- Rosedale, Washington, a census-designated place
- Rosedale, West Virginia, an unincorporated community

==== Neighborhoods ====
- Rosedale, Colorado, part of the city of Greeley
- Rosedale, Kansas, a neighborhood in Kansas City
- Rosedale, Queens, New York, a neighborhood in New York City
- Rosedale, Austin, Texas, a neighborhood in central Austin, Texas
- Rosedale, a neighborhood in northeast Washington, D.C.
- Rosedale, a neighborhood in west Detroit

==== Other places ====
- Rosedale Historic District (Homewood, Alabama), on the National Register of Historic Places listings in Alabama
- Rosedale (Middletown, Delaware), listed on the National Register of Historic Places (NRHP) in Delaware
- Rosedale Center, a regional shopping mall in Roseville, Minnesota
- Rosedale (Columbus, Mississippi), listed on the NRHP in Mississippi
- Rosedale Historic District (Rosedale, Mississippi), on the National Register of Historic Places listings in Mississippi
- Rosedale (Charlotte, North Carolina), listed on the NRHP in North Carolina
- Rosedale (Washington, North Carolina), listed on the NRHP in North Carolina
- Rosedale Historic District (Covington, Virginia), listed on the NRHP in Virginia
- Rosedale (Lynchburg, Virginia), listed on the NRHP in Virginia
- Rosedale (Washington, D.C.), listed on the NRHP in Washington, D.C.
- Rosedale Plantation, Vaughn, Mississippi
- Rosedale, the former name of an estate in Cleveland Park in northwest Washington, D.C.

== Transportation ==
- Rosedale Railway, a former railway line in North Yorkshire, England
- SS Rosedale, a ship wrecked in 1893 at St Ives, Cornwall, England
- Rosedale (ferry), a ship from 1910 at Hoboken, New Jersey
- Rosedale Avenue (Bronx), a very wide street in Soundview, Bronx, New York City
- Rosedale Highway, a portion of California State Route 58
- Rosedale railway station, Rosedale, Victoria, Australia
- Rosedale station (Toronto), a subway stop in Toronto, Canada
- Rosedale station (LIRR), a train station in Queens, New York City

== People ==
- Philip Rosedale (born 1968), American entrepreneur
- Ron Rosedale M.D., specialist in nutritional and metabolic medicine

== Schools ==
- Rosedale College, a mixed secondary school and sixth form in the London Borough of Hillingdon, England
- Rosedale Bible College, Rosedale, Ohio, United States
- Rosedale Elementary School (disambiguation)

== Other uses ==
- Rosedale Presbyterian Church, Rosedale, Toronto, Canada
- Rosedale Odd Fellows Temple, Boise, Idaho, on the National Register of Historic Places
- Rosedale: The Way It Is
