= Tague =

Tague can refer to:

== Places ==
- Tague, West Virginia

== People ==
- Christopher Tague (born 1969/1970), American politician, farmer, and businessman
- James Tague (1936–2014), a notable witness to the assassination of US President John F. Kennedy
- Lydia Berkley Tague (1868–1937), county judge of Eagle County, Colorado
- Peter Francis Tague (1871–1941), member of the US House of Representatives from Massachusetts
- Robert Bruce Tague (1912–1985), American modernist architect and abstract artist from Chicago, Illinois
- Stephanie Tague (born 1966), English actress
