= Stumptown Wildlife Management Area =

State Wildlife Management Area in Calhoun and Gilmer counties, West Virginia

- IUCN category V (protected landscape/seascape)
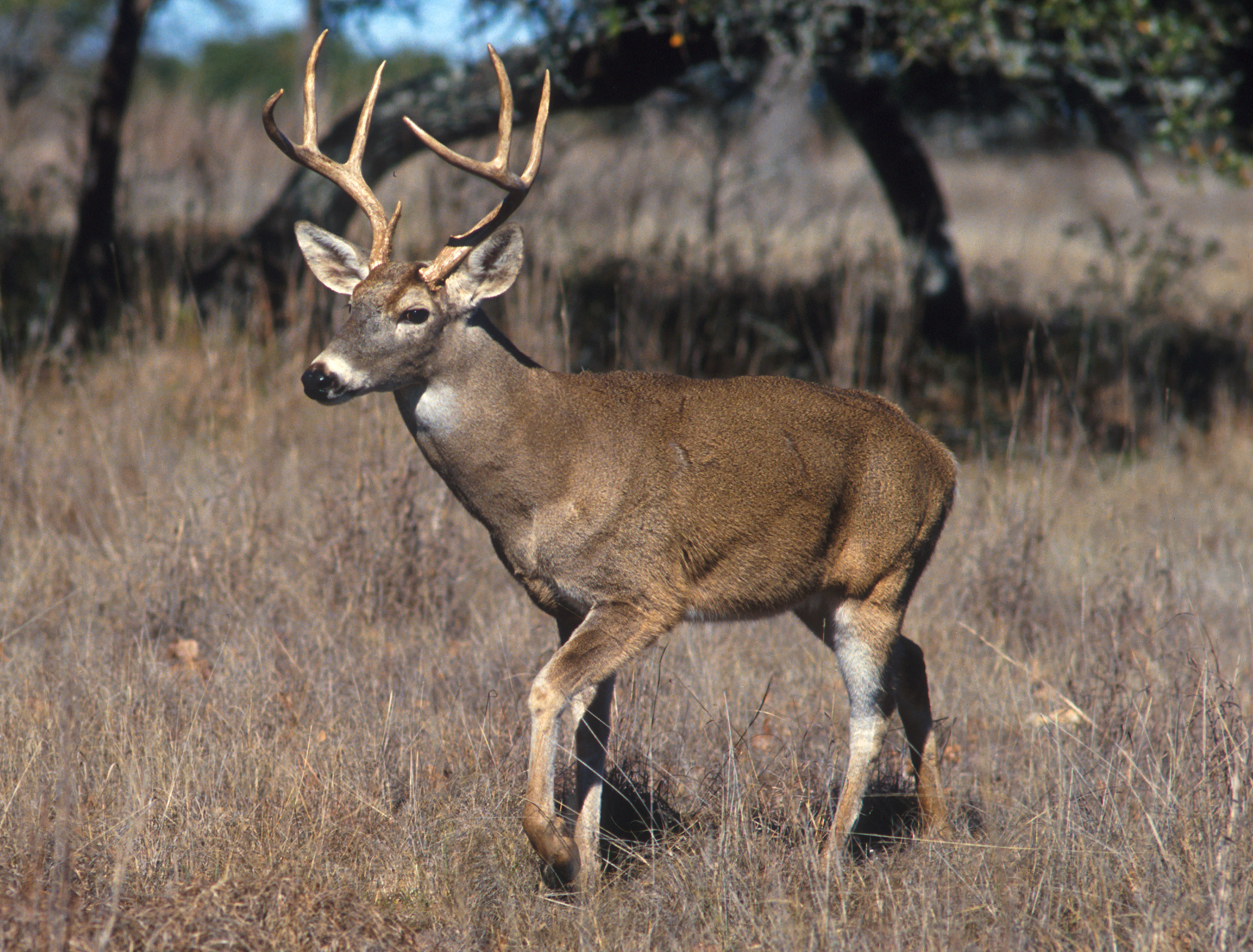
- White tail deer (Odocoileus virginianus) may be found at the Stumptown WMA

- Location within West Virginia
- Location: West Virginia, United States
- Coordinates: 38°50′46″N 80°59′26″W
- Area: 1,675 acres (6.78 km^{2})
- Elevation: 734 ft (224 m)
- Operator: Wildlife Resources Section, WV Division of Natural Resources

Stumptown Wildlife Management Area is located in both Calhoun and Gilmer Counties near the community of Stumptown, West Virginia. Stumptown WMA is located on 1,675 acres (678 ha) of hilly terrain, mostly covered with mixed oak and pine forest, with stands of mixed hardwoods.

Access to Stumptown WMA is from the north off U.S. Route 33 on Mikes Run Road at Stumptown, on Middle Run Road at Lockney, and on Lower Run Road at Normantown.

== Hunting, trapping and fishing ==
Hunting opportunities in Stumptown WMA include deer, grouse, raccoon, squirrel, and turkey.

Fishing opportunities are very limited here, as both Middle Run and Lower Run tend to run dry most summers.

Camping is not allowed in the WMA. Camping is available at nearby Cedar Creek State Park.

== See also ==
- Animal conservation
- Hunting
- List of West Virginia wildlife management areas
