= Cedar Creek (West Virginia) =

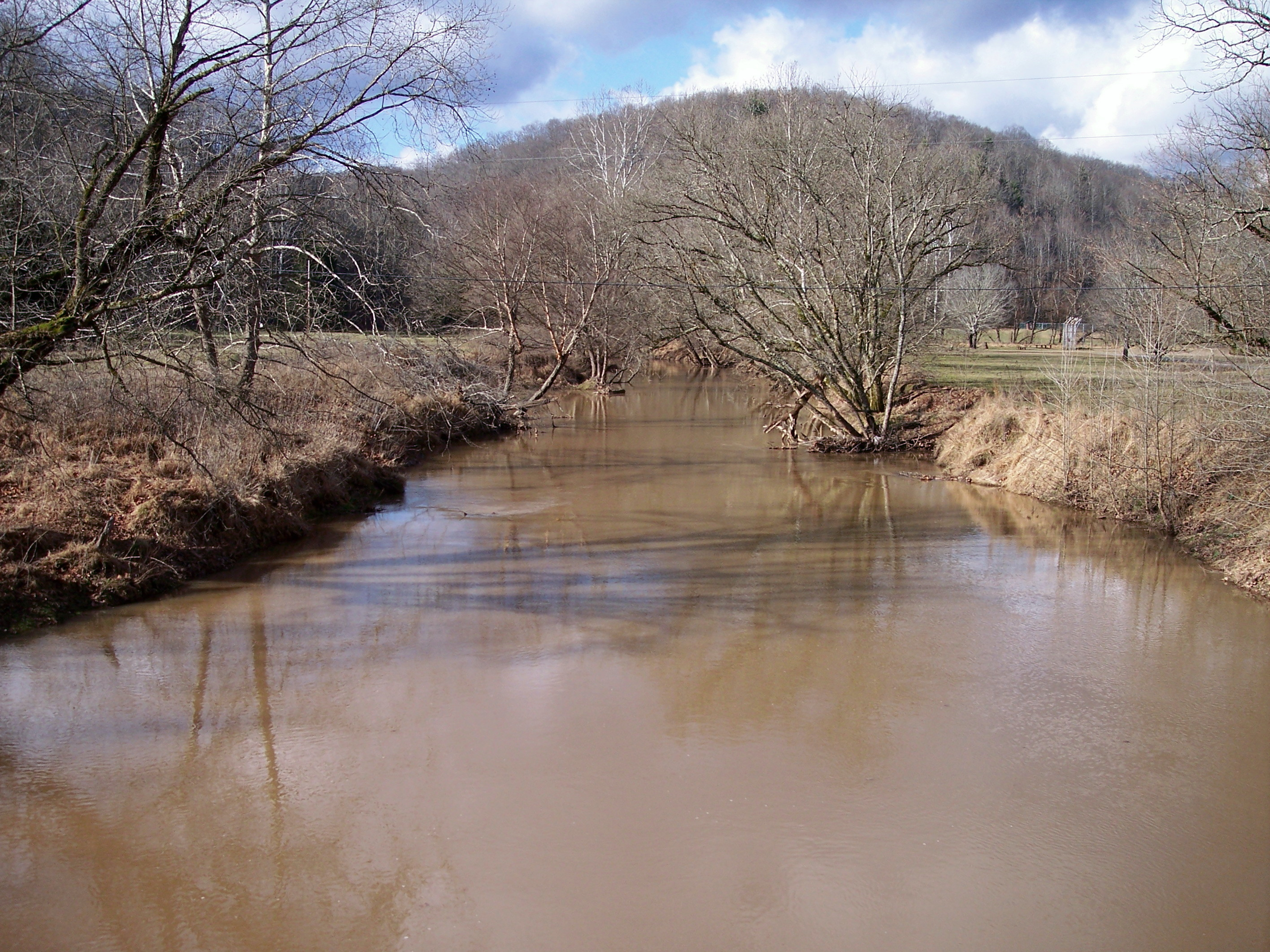
- Cedar Creek in Cedar Creek State Park

- Location of the mouth of Cedar Creek in Gilmer County, West Virginia

Location
- Country: United States
- State: West Virginia
- Counties: Braxton, Gilmer

Physical characteristics
- Source
  - location: west of Flatwoods
  - coordinates: 38.7253768°N 80.6634283°W
  - elevation: 1,306 ft (398 m)
- Mouth: Little Kanawha River
  - location: west of Glenville
  - coordinates: 38.9409221°N 80.9209396°W
  - elevation: 696 ft (212 m)
- Length: 31.7 mi (51.0 km)
- Basin size: 81 sq mi (210 km^{2})

Basin features
- Tributaries
  - left: Westfall Fork

Cedar Creek is a tributary of the Little Kanawha River, 31.7 miles (51.0 km) long, in central West Virginia in the United States. Via the Little Kanawha and Ohio rivers, it is part of the watershed of the Mississippi River, draining an area of 81 square miles (210 km^{2}) in a rural region on the unglaciated portion of the Allegheny Plateau.

Cedar Creek rises approximately 1 mile (1.6 km) west of Flatwoods in Braxton County and flows generally northwestward into Gilmer County, through the unincorporated community of Cedarville and through Cedar Creek State Park. It flows into the Little Kanawha River approximately 5 miles (8.0 km) west of Glenville.

According to the West Virginia Department of Environmental Protection, approximately 90.5% of the Cedar Creek watershed is forested, mostly deciduous. Approximately 9.2% is used for pasture and agriculture.

The creek was named for the cedar trees along its course.

== See also ==
- List of rivers of West Virginia
