= Revore, West Virginia =

- Unincorporated community
- Location within West Virginia Location within the United States
- Coordinates: 38°58′29″N 80°59′57″W
- Country: United States
- State: West Virginia
- County: Gilmer
- Elevation: 764 ft (233 m)
- Time zone: UTC-5 (Eastern (EST))
  - Summer (DST): UTC-4 (EDT)
- GNIS feature ID: 1555466

Revore is an unincorporated community in Gilmer County, West Virginia, United States.
