= Steer Creek (West Virginia) =

- Location of the mouth of Steer Creek in Calhoun County, West Virginia

Location
- Country: United States
- State: West Virginia
- Counties: Gilmer, Calhoun

Physical characteristics
- Source: Right Fork Steer Creek
  - location: western Braxton County
  - coordinates: 38.6448192°N 80.9326051°W
  - length: 25.4 miles (40.9 km)
  - elevation: 1,230 ft (370 m)
- 2nd source: Left Fork Steer Creek
  - location: central Braxton County
  - coordinates: 38.717042°N 80.7778777°W
  - length: 24.5 miles (39.4 km)
  - elevation: 1,242 ft (379 m)
- Source confluence
  - location: Stumptown, Gilmer County
  - coordinates: 38.8448122°N 80.990942°W
  - elevation: 696 ft (212 m)
- Mouth: Little Kanawha River
  - location: southeast of Grantsville, Calhoun County
  - coordinates: 38.8742550°N 81.0567776°W
  - elevation: 673 ft (205 m)
- Length: 6.3 mi (10.1 km)
- Basin size: 184 sq mi (480 km^{2})

Steer Creek is a tributary of the Little Kanawha River in central West Virginia in the United States. Via the Little Kanawha and Ohio rivers, it is part of the watershed of the Mississippi River, draining an area of 184 square miles (480 km^{2}) in a rural region on the unglaciated portion of the Allegheny Plateau. It is 6.3 miles (10.1 km) long, or 31.7 miles (51.0 km) long including its Right Fork.

Steer Creek is formed by the confluence of its Right Fork and its Left Fork:

- The Right Fork Steer Creek, 25.4 miles (40.9 km) long, rises approximately 5 miles (8.0 km) northwest of Frametown in western Braxton County and flows generally north-northwestward into southern Gilmer County, through the communities of Tague, Rosedale, and Shock.
- The Left Fork Steer Creek, 24.5 miles (39.4 km) long, rises approximately 3 miles (4.8 km) north of Gassaway in central Braxton County and flows generally northwestward into southern Gilmer County, through the communities of Chapel, Normantown, and Lockney.

The left and right forks converge at Stumptown and the main stem of Steer Creek flows west-northwestward into eastern Calhoun County, where it joins the Little Kanawha River approximately 4 miles (6.4 km) southeast of Grantsville.

According to the West Virginia Department of Environmental Protection, approximately 91.1% of the Steer Creek watershed is forested, mostly deciduous. Approximately 8.7% is used for pasture and agriculture.

== See also ==
- List of rivers of West Virginia
