= Dusk (disambiguation) =

Dusk is the time of day just after sunset.

Dusk may also refer to:

== Film and television ==
- Dusk, a 1970 film featuring Peter Yang
- Dusk, a 2010 film featuring Melody Klaver
- Dusk, a fictional film series in the 2010 film My Babysitter's a Vampire
- Dusk!, a European erotic television channel for women
- Dusk (TV channel), a defunct Canadian cable channel
- Dusk, the drummer of the fictional band The Hex Girls

== Literature ==
=== Fictional characters ===
- Dusk (comics), several Marvel Comics characters
- Dusk, a character in DC Comics' The Final Night
- Nathaniel Dusk, a DC Comics character

=== Novels ===
- Darkwing (novel) or Dusk, a 2007 Silverwing novel by Kenneth Oppel
- Dusk, a 2006 novel by Tim Lebbon
- Dusk (Arnott novel), a 2024 novel by Australian writer Robbie Arnott
- Po-on or Dusk, a 1984 novel by F. Sionil Jose

=== Play ===
- Dusk (play), a 1941 verse drama by Paul Goodman

== Music ==
=== Classical and jazz compositions ===
- Dusk, two compositions (2004, 2008) by Steven Bryant
- Dusk, a 1944 choral work by Ferenc Farkas
- "Dusk", a 1926 song by Roy Agnew
- "Dusk", a waltz by Cecil Armstrong Gibbs
- "Dusk", a c. 1940 composition by Duke Ellington; see the 1986 album The Blanton–Webster Band

=== Bands ===
- Dusk, a 1970s American girl group featuring Peggy Santiglia

=== Albums ===
- Dusk (Andrew Hill album) or the title song, 2000
- Dusk (Badlands album), 1998
- Dusk (The The album), 1993
- Dusk (Mxmtoon EP), 2020
- Dusk (Yoon San-ha EP), 2024
- Dusk, by Ladyfinger (ne), 2009
- Dusk EP, by Au5, 2019

=== Songs ===
- "Dusk", by Entombed from Entombed, 1997
- "Dusk", by Genesis from Trespass, 1970
- "Dusk", by Kabir Suman from Reaching Out, 2003

== Other uses ==
- Dusk (Michelangelo), a c. 1524–1534 marble sculpture in the Medici Chapel, Florence, Italy
- Dusk (video game), a 2018 first-person shooter
- Dusk, West Virginia, US
- Matt Dusk (born 1978), Canadian jazz vocalist
- Dusk, a nightclub at Caesars Atlantic City
