= Michael Smith House =

Historic house in West Virginia, United States

- U.S. National Register of Historic Places
- Location within West Virginia Location within the United States
- Location: End of County Route 5/1, 1 mi (1.6 km) from its junction with County Route 19/26, near Cedarville, West Virginia
- Coordinates: 38°48′39″N 80°48′4″W
- Area: less than one acre
- Built: 1848
- Architect: Smith, Michael; Smith, Jacob Ferdinand
- Architectural style: Double-Pen Log House
- NRHP reference No.: 06000902
- Added to NRHP: September 28, 2006

Michael Smith House is a historic home located near Cedarville, Gilmer County, West Virginia. The original section, measuring 22 feet by 19 feet, was built in 1848, and constructed of large hand-hewn logs supported by a foundation of rock pillars spaced about ten feet apart. In 1878, a log addition, 18 feet by 19 feet, was added to the west end of the log house. The house has a six-foot porch across the entire front. The house was built as part of a settlement of German immigrants.

It was listed on the National Register of Historic Places in 2006.
