= Cedarville, West Virginia =

Unincorporated community in West Virginia, United States

- Unincorporated community
- Location within West Virginia Location within the United States
- Coordinates: 38°50′32″N 80°49′09″W
- Country: United States
- State: West Virginia
- County: Gilmer
- Elevation: 787 ft (240 m)
- Time zone: UTC-5 (Eastern (EST))
  - Summer (DST): UTC-4 (EDT)
- ZIP code: 26611
- Area codes: 304 & 681
- GNIS feature ID: 1537147

Cedarville is an unincorporated community in Gilmer County, West Virginia, United States. Cedarville is 6.5 miles (10.5 km) south of Glenville, along Cedar Creek, from which the community takes its name. Cedarville has a post office that is no longer active with ZIP code 26611.

The Michael Smith House was listed on the National Register of Historic Places in 2006.
