= Chapel, West Virginia =

Unincorporated community in West Virginia, United States

- Unincorporated community
- Location within West Virginia Location within the United States
- Coordinates: 38°44′51″N 80°48′17″W
- Country: United States
- State: West Virginia
- County: Braxton
- Elevation: 912 ft (278 m)
- Time zone: UTC-5 (Eastern (EST))
  - Summer (DST): UTC-4 (EDT)
- Area codes: 304 & 681
- GNIS feature ID: 1537194

Chapel is an unincorporated community in Braxton County, West Virginia, United States. Chapel is 5.5 miles (8.9 km) north-northwest of Gassaway, along the Left Fork Steer Creek.
