= Shock, West Virginia =

- Unincorporated community
- Location within West Virginia Location within the United States
- Coordinates: 38°46′42″N 80°57′59″W
- Country: United States
- State: West Virginia
- County: Gilmer
- Elevation: 741 ft (226 m)
- Time zone: UTC-5 (Eastern (EST))
  - Summer (DST): UTC-4 (EDT)
- ZIP code: 26638
- Area codes: 304 & 681
- GNIS feature ID: 1549928

Shock is an unincorporated community in Gilmer County, West Virginia, United States. Shock is 13 miles (21 km) southwest of Glenville, along the Right Fork Steer Creek. Shock has a post office with ZIP code 26638.

The community was named after the Shock family, original owners of the town site.

== Climate ==
The climate in this area is characterized by hot, humid summers and generally mild to cool winters. According to the Köppen Climate Classification system, Shock has a humid subtropical climate, abbreviated "Cfa" on climate maps.
