= Lockney, West Virginia =

- Unincorporated community
- Location within West Virginia Location within the United States
- Coordinates: 38°51′22″N 80°58′01″W
- Country: United States
- State: West Virginia
- County: Gilmer
- Elevation: 718 ft (219 m)
- Time zone: UTC-5 (Eastern (EST))
  - Summer (DST): UTC-4 (EDT)
- Area codes: 304 & 681
- GNIS feature ID: 1542288

Lockney is an unincorporated community in Gilmer County, West Virginia, United States. Lockney is located along U.S. Routes 33 and 119 and the Left Fork Steer Creek, 9 miles (14 km) southwest of Glenville. Lockney had a post office, which opened on May 17, 1898, and closed on November 9, 2002. The community was named after H. C. Lockney, a senator who was instrumental in securing for the town a post office.
