= Letter Gap, West Virginia =

- Unincorporated community
- Location within West Virginia Location within the United States
- Coordinates: 38°52′54″N 80°54′36″W
- Country: United States
- State: West Virginia
- County: Gilmer
- Elevation: 830 ft (250 m)
- Time zone: UTC-5 (Eastern (EST))
  - Summer (DST): UTC-4 (EDT)
- ZIP codes: 25255
- Area codes: 304 & 681
- GNIS feature ID: 1541800

Letter Gap is an unincorporated community in Gilmer County, West Virginia, United States. Letter Gap is located on U.S. Routes 33 and 119, 5.5 miles (8.9 km) southwest of Glenville. Letter Gap had a post office, which closed on February 1, 1997.
