= Normantown, West Virginia =

Unincorporated community in West Virginia, US

Coordinates: 38°51′06″N 80°56′11″W

Normantown is an unincorporated community in Gilmer County, West Virginia, United States, along the Left Fork Steer Creek. It lies at an elevation of 741 feet (226 m).

== History ==
James Norman, a son of John and Lydia (Brown) Norman, was born in Duffield, Derby, England in 1776 and was christened at Derby parish May 19, 1776. At this writing, it is not known when or how James came to America. We do know that he married Mary Nedley, who was born in 1775 in Virginia. In 1810, the Randolph County VA (WV) Census listed the 12 member family of James Norman.

James "Jimmy" Norman (1910–1982), son of Elmer Dotson Norman, helped build the two-story stone "Norman Cottage" in Normantown, WV just west of the school on US 33/119. His grandfather, James Paul Norman, told how James, Mary, and one son, Semore, came over the mountains by wagon, from present-day Barbour County WV, to settle in the fertile valleys sometimes called "the blue grass belt of WV" prior to 1830. They spent their first winter on the Left Fork of Steer Creek, in a bark lean-to, built in a small ravine just below the present road near where Richard Parsons now lives. The following year, they built a house at the forks of White Oak Camp Run and the Left Fork of Steer Creek. For many years a large stone stood in the meadow marking the site of their home. Then one hot summer day, Jimmy Norman removed it. In his words, "I had skinned my knuckles just one too many times, trying to maneuver the horses and equipment around that rock." According to Jimmy, James received a 1,000 acres land grant from the Governor of Virginia.

Jimmy recalled: "I can show you every corner." The stone house is on the original grant. James also received a grant in 1831 from the Governor of Virginia for 45 acres on Steer Creek, and in 1837 another tract of 50 acres on Steer Run. Daniel DeWeese (1821–1905), a Confederate Civil War Veteran and lifelong resident of Gilmer and Calhoun Counties, recalled James Norman in his 1904 book, "Recollections and Experiences of a Lifetime":

"During the Summer of 1843, one Sunday at prayer meeting, which was being conducted at the residence of Wm. Boggs, James Norman, a man of devout mind and very reserved and timid, a gray haired pilgrim whose sands of time were nearly run, in the course of the services arose and for the first time he was ever known to speak in public gave such a profound and convincing exhortation that all who were present were soul feelingly stirred and sensibly impressed. "I myself being so forcibly imbued and touched by Father Norman's appeal that not long after I joined the Church and was baptized in Steer Creek just below the forks of Steer Creek at Stumptown by the Rev. Carr Bailey who was pastor of Mt. Pisgah Church from 1842 to 1844 and was received into full fellowship and continued a member of the Mt. Pisgah Baptist Church at Stumptown, Gilmer County, then Virginia, now WV, over fourteen years." James and Mary (Nedley) Norman were enumerated in the 1850 Census of Gilmer County (He was 74 and she 75). James wrote his will June 10, 1852 and died less than a month later on July 6, 1852. His will is recorded in Will Book l, Page 8 at the Gilmer County Court House, Glenville, WV

== See also ==
- Stumptown Wildlife Management Area
