= Tanner, West Virginia =

- Unincorporated community
- Location within West Virginia Location within the United States
- Coordinates: 38°58′53″N 80°56′58″W
- Country: United States
- State: West Virginia
- County: Gilmer
- Elevation: 755 ft (230 m)
- Time zone: UTC-5 (Eastern (EST))
  - Summer (DST): UTC-4 (EDT)
- Area codes: 304 & 681
- GNIS feature ID: 1547891

Tanner is an unincorporated community in Gilmer County, West Virginia, United States.

The community was named after an early settler named Tanner.
