= Gilmer, West Virginia =

Unincorporated community in West Virginia, United States

- Unincorporated community
- Location within West Virginia Location within the United States
- Coordinates: 38°52′45″N 80°43′00″W
- Country: United States
- State: West Virginia
- County: Gilmer
- Elevation: 755 ft (230 m)
- Time zone: UTC-5 (Eastern (EST))
  - Summer (DST): UTC-4 (EDT)
- Area codes: 304 & 681
- GNIS feature ID: 1554557

Gilmer is an unincorporated community in Gilmer County, West Virginia, United States. Gilmer is located along West Virginia Route 5 and the Little Kanawha River, 3 miles (4.8 km) southeast of Sand Fork. Gilmer had a post office, which opened on November 28, 1905, and closed on November 2, 2002.
