= Rosedale Elementary School =

Rosedale Elementary School may refer to the following schools:

- A school in School District 33 Chilliwack in the Fraser Valley region of British Columbia
- A school in the Hillsboro School District in Hillsboro, Oregon
- A school in the Livonia Public Schools near Detroit, Michigan
- A school in the Chico Unified School District in Chico, California
- A school in the Middletown City Schools District in Middletown, Ohio
- A former school in Rosedale, West Virginia
