= Federal Correctional Institution, Gilmer =

Medium-security prison in West Virginia, US

Coordinates: 38°54′56″N 80°47′03″W

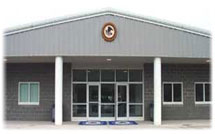
- Interactive map of Federal Correctional Institution, Gilmer
- Location: Gilmer County, near Glenville, West Virginia
- Status: Operational
- Security class: Medium-Security (with minimum-security prison camp)
- Population: 1,730 (160 in prison camp)
- Managed by: Federal Bureau of Prisons

The Federal Correctional Institution, Gilmer (FCI Gilmer) is a medium-security United States federal prison for male inmates in West Virginia. It is operated by the Federal Bureau of Prisons, a division of the United States Department of Justice. An adjacent satellite prison camp houses minimum-security male inmates.

FCI Gilmer is located in central West Virginia, 85 miles (137 km) northeast of Charleston and 150 miles (240 km) from Pittsburgh, Pennsylvania.

== Notable inmates (current and former) ==
Inmate Name	Register Number	Status	Details
Hector Rivera	90335-054	Serving a life sentence	Leader of a robbery crew which stole millions of dollars in diamonds and other jewels from businesses in the Diamond District in Manhattan, New York; convicted in 2009 of committing Hobbs Act robbery and using a firearm during crimes of violence.
Edward Brown	03923-049	Serving a 37 year sentence, scheduled for release in 2034	Tax protester, participated in a standoff
Earl Simmons	76031-054	Served a year in prison released January 25, 2019	Rapper known as DMX, pleaded guilty to tax fraud in 2018

== See also ==
- List of U.S. federal prisons
- Federal Bureau of Prisons
- Incarceration in the United States
