= West Virginia Mine Wars Museum =

History museum in Matewan, West Virginia, United States

- Established: May 16, 2015
- Location: 401 Mate Street; Matewan, West Virginia, United States
- Coordinates: 37°37′21″N 82°9′55″W
- Type: History museum
- Website: wvminewars.org

The West Virginia Mine Wars Museum is located in Matewan, West Virginia, United States. It was opened in 2015 and focuses on the area's labor history, with particular emphasis on the Coal Wars and the 1921 Battle of Blair Mountain. Around 2021, the museum engaged in a number of events to commemorate the centennial of this event, which included the creation of several monuments along a trail associated with the battle.

== History ==
=== Background ===
According to the news website The Real WV, the idea for the museum originated in 2011 amongst activists, including coal miners and environmentalists, who were protesting mountaintop removal mining efforts on Blair Mountain. The mountain had been the site of the 1921 Battle of Blair Mountain, which had been the largest armed labor uprising in American history and the largest uprising following the American Civil War. The event had been the culmination of a decades-long series of conflicts between miners and coal owners called Coal Wars (also known as the Mine Wars). Matewan, West Virginia, was selected by organizers as the location for the museum, with the journal Now & Then saying that it was selected because of its history and local support. The town had been the site of the Matewan Massacre, a violent confrontation between miners and coal mine operators. The town's labor history was dramatized in the 1987 film Matewan, which was followed by an oral history project in the area. In 2026, the town had a population of about 400, with coal mining still a prominent part of the economy. Among early supporters of the museum was the local union of the United Mine Workers of America, UMWA Local 1440.

=== Opening and further activities ===
In November 2014, the museum held an open house prior to its official opening, which was scheduled for early the following year. The museum opened on May 16, 2015, with about 500 people attending the event. Cecil Roberts, the president of the UMWA, was scheduled to attend as a speaker. At this time, the museum was housed in the Hope Building, formerly the location of Chambers Hardware Store, which had been a focal point of the 1920 confrontation. The building bore several visible bullet holes stemming from the conflict. Later that year, Don Blankenship, a former businessman in the coal industry, visited the museum. On May 1, 2016, in celebration of International Workers' Day, the museum was scheduled to host a screening of the film The Mine Wars, in conjunction with UMWA Local 1440. The movie, a documentary on labor history in the region made for public television, was produced with assistance from several museum board members. In October 2017, the museum sponsored a 30th anniversary screening of Matewan in South Charleston.

In 2020, the museum moved to a larger venue, the Cecil E. Roberts Building, which is a two-story building that formerly housed the Matewan National Bank. The building is owned and operated by UMWA Local 1440. The new location is across the street from the old one, with a street address of 401 Mate Street. The museum planned to reopen in May 2020, but the impact of the COVID-19 pandemic caused the event to be pushed back. It eventually officially reopened on September 3, 2020. The following year, the museum was one of several local institutions to give a grant of approximately $49,000 (equivalent to $58,000 in 2025) towards the restoration of several historic buildings in Matewan.

In February 2023, the museum announced an exhibit on teachers' strikes in the state, which opened in August. That same year, the museum announced its first Camp Solidarity project, to be conducted that October. The event would be a training project conducted by the museum to assist labor activists and was named after a camp set up by strikers during the Pittston Coal strike. In June 2024, the museum started a new project on recording African American labor history, and the following month they announced a campaign to archive community labor artifacts. In September 2025, the museum received a $50,000 donation from UMWA President Roberts. The following year, the museum was involved in two mural projects. One, called Solidarity, was located in Huntington in commemoration of the mine wars and was created by artist Sassa Wilkes with support from the museum. The other one, Matewan 250, was created by artist Blake Wheeler, with support from the museum, the town of Matewan, and the local convention and visitors bureau, as part of the United States Semiquincentennial celebrations.

==== Centennial commemorations of the Battle of Blair Mountain ====
In mid-2017, the museum received a $30,000 grant ($39,000 in 2025) from the National Endowment for the Humanities to assist the institution on projects to commemorate the centennial anniversary of the Battle of Blair Mountain in 2021. The museum hosted several activities in 2021 to celebrate the event's centennial, including symposiums, concerts, and picnics. Efforts to commemorate the centennial were also supported by cast and crew members of the film Matewan, including actors Chris Cooper, James Earl Jones, and David Strathairn. In mid-2021, the museum, along with the West Virginia University Press, assisted author Anne Lawrence in publishing On Dark and Bloody Ground, a book about the battle based on interviews conducted in 1972 with eyewitnesses to the event. Later that year, on September 2, the museum participated in a Labor Day film festival at Marshall University in Huntington.

One program the museum sponsored during the centennial celebrations was called "Blair Footsteps" and consisted of a pop-up trail indicating where participants in the battle marched towards the mountain. The program lasted two weeks, but their positive reception led to another project the following year, called "Courage in the Hollers: Mapping the Miners' Struggle for a Union". This project was intended to erect memorials and monuments along the trail of the marchers, from Marmet to Clothier, and was conducted in conjunction with several other organizations, including a grant from the Monument Lab in Philadelphia. In Marmet, a statue of activist Mother Jones was erected, while a monument in Clothier depicted miners in silhouette. The project aimed to cover a trail approximately 50 miles (80 kilometers) long, with reporter Chris Schulz of West Virginia Public Broadcasting calling it "the largest labor history driving trail in the United States". The monuments were dedicated on Labor Day in September 2022.

In late 2025, the museum announced that it would be overseeing an additional phase of the monuments project, installing memorials and markers in six additional sites along the trail. In July 2026, they hosted a community event where participants brainstormed ideas for the trail projet. That year, on the 105th anniversary of the battle, the museum posted a day-by-day account of the event on its social media accounts.

== Collections ==
Bullets from the Battle of Blair Mountain on display at the museum

The museum primarily focuses on the region's labor history from the early 20th century. Specific objects include artifacts from the local railroad and coal mining industry and company scrip. The museum also has numerous union artifacts, and in 2016, the museum operated an exhibit in conjunction with UMWA Local 1440 called the Miners Memorial. Concerning the mine wars in particular, there are several guns, including those used in violent labor conflicts, and a red bandanna worn by a participant in the Battle of Blair Mountain. According to reporter Josh Brown of The Herald-Dispatch, the bandanna is "[o]ne of the most coveted pieces of Mine Wars history". In addition to a permanent collection, the museum has a rotating art gallery.

== See also ==
- List of museums in West Virginia
