= Old Stone House (Pennsboro, West Virginia) =

Historic house in West Virginia, United States

- U.S. National Register of Historic Places
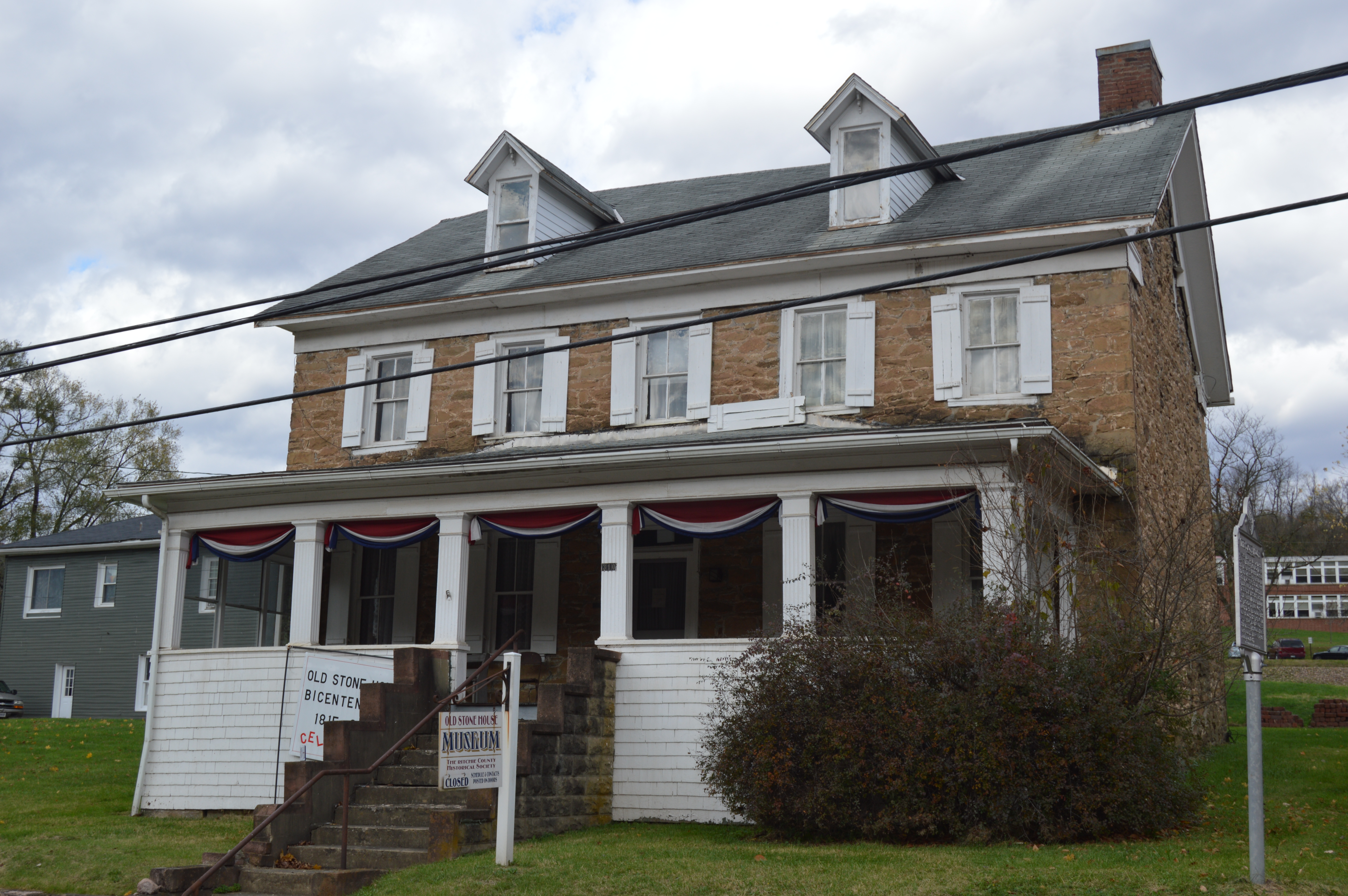
- Front of the house

- Location within West Virginia Location within the United States
- Location: 310 W. Myles Ave., Pennsboro, West Virginia
- Coordinates: 39°17′5″N 80°58′20″W
- Area: 0.5 acres (0.20 ha)
- Built: 1810
- NRHP reference No.: 78002811
- Added to NRHP: July 21, 1978

Old Stone House, also known as the Webster-Martin-Ireland House, is a historic inn and boarding house, located at Pennsboro, Ritchie County, West Virginia. The main section was built about 1810, and is a 2 1/2-story stone structure, five bays wide and two bays deep, with a gable roof. Attached to it is a two-story frame addition with a hipped roof. It features a one-story porch across the front facade. It is open by the Ritchie County Historical Society as a historic house and local history museum.

It was listed on the National Register of Historic Places in 1978.
