= Stumptown, West Virginia =

- Unincorporated community
- Location within West Virginia Location within the United States
- Coordinates: 38°50′56″N 80°59′38″W
- Country: United States
- State: West Virginia
- County: Gilmer
- Elevation: 725 ft (221 m)
- Time zone: UTC-5 (Eastern (EST))
  - Summer (DST): UTC-4 (EDT)
- ZIP codes: 25280
- FIPS code: 1555732

Stumptown is an unincorporated community in Gilmer County, West Virginia, United States, at the confluence of the left and right forks of Steer Creek. It was named for Michael Stump III, a pioneer settler. It lies at an elevation of 725 feet (221 m). The Stumptown Post Office opened May 29, 1883 and closed February 1, 1997.

== See also ==
- Stumptown Wildlife Management Area
- The Shack Neighborhood House
