= Pennsboro station =

- Pennsboro B&O Depot
- U.S. National Register of Historic Places
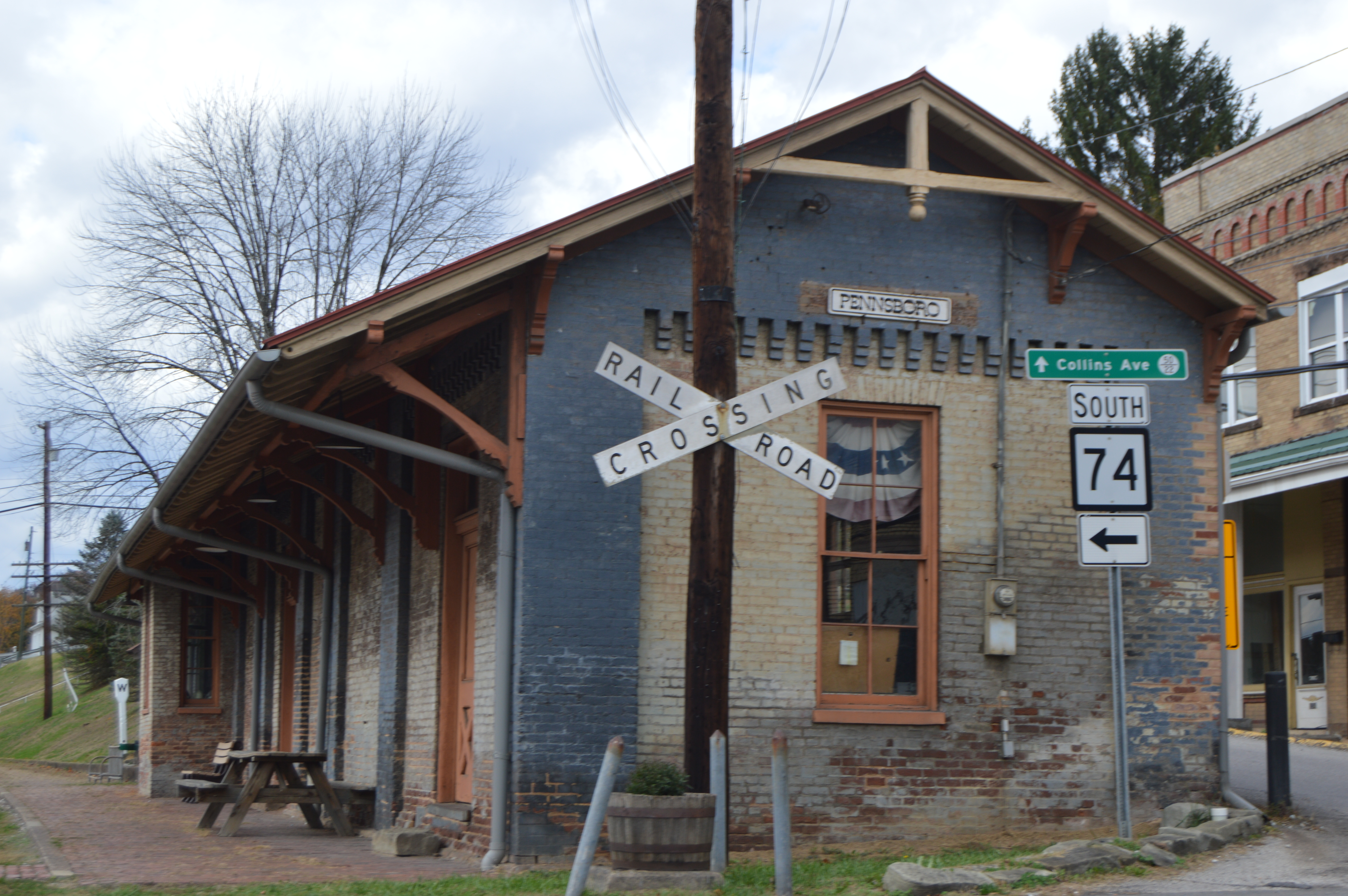
- Eastern end

- Location within West Virginia Location within the United States
- Location: Corner of Broadway St. and Collins Ave., Pennsboro, West Virginia
- Coordinates: 39°17′6″N 80°58′7″W
- Area: less than 1-acre (4,000 m^{2})
- Built: 1883
- Architect: B&O Railroad
- Architectural style: Stick/Eastlake
- NRHP reference No.: 07000242
- Added to NRHP: March 27, 2007

Pennsboro station is a historic railway depot located at Pennsboro, Ritchie County, West Virginia. It is a one-story brick building built on two sections. It was constructed by the Baltimore and Ohio Railroad, with the first section built in 1883, and the second added around 1900. It consists of three rooms and is approximately 1,315 square feet (122.2 m^{2}) in size. It was restored by the Ritchie County Historical Museum and open as a railroad museum and community center.

It was listed on the National Register of Historic Places in 2007 as the Pennsboro B&O Depot.

Preceding station	Baltimore and Ohio Railroad	Following station
Ellenboro toward St. Louis	St. Louis Line	Toll Gate toward Cumberland
