= Baldwin, West Virginia =

Unincorporated community in West Virginia, United States

- Unincorporated community
- Location within West Virginia Location within the United States
- Coordinates: 38°58′22″N 80°45′16″W
- Country: United States
- State: West Virginia
- County: Gilmer
- Elevation: 833 ft (254 m)
- Time zone: UTC-5 (Eastern (EST))
  - Summer (DST): UTC-4 (EDT)
- Area codes: 304 & 681
- GNIS feature ID: 1553790

Baldwin is an unincorporated community in Gilmer County, West Virginia, United States. Baldwin is located on U.S. routes 33 and 119, 5.2 miles (8.4 km) east-northeast of Glenville.
