= Lydia Berkley Tague =

Colorado county judge

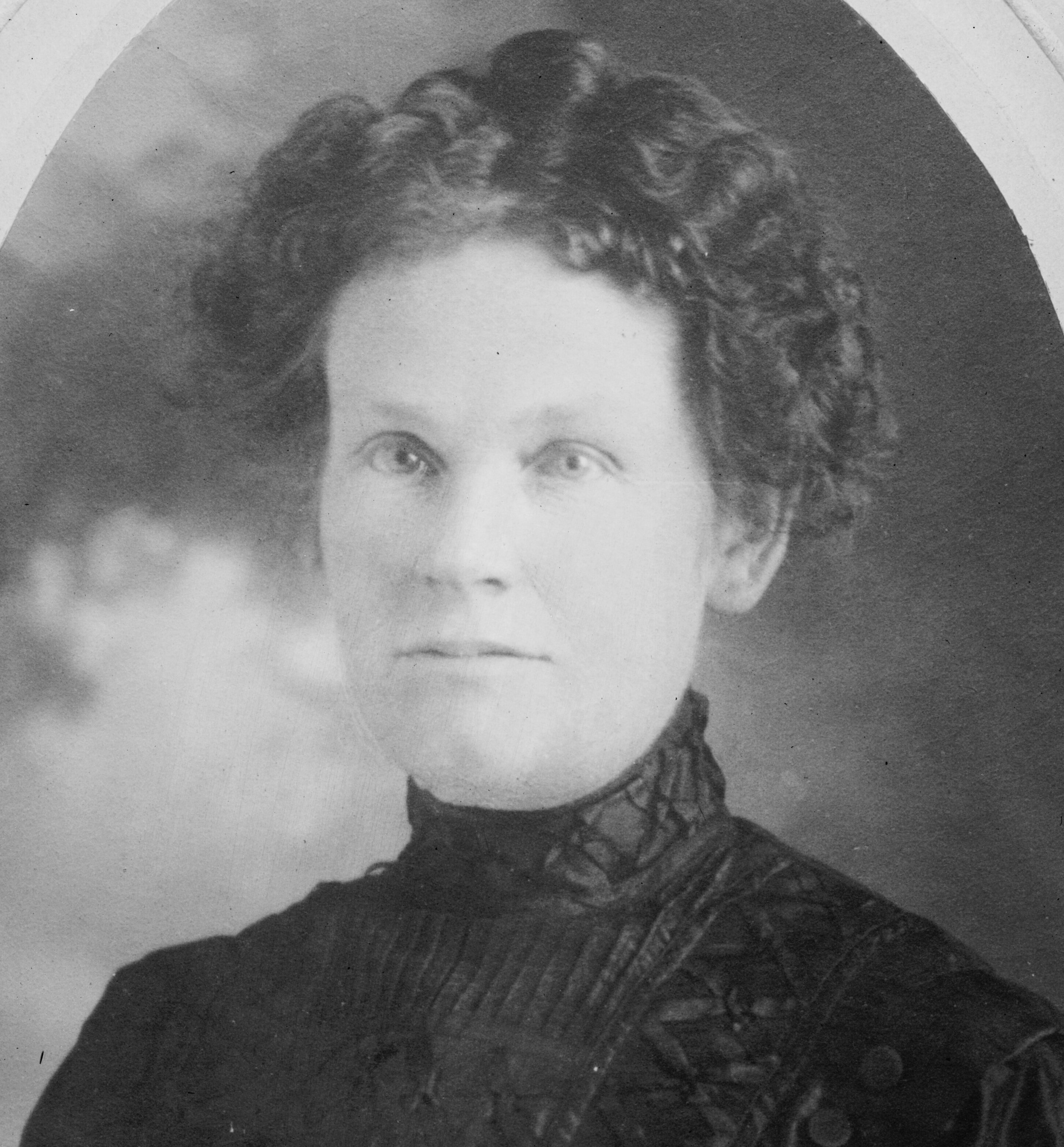

County Judge of Eagle County
- In office 1911–1924

Personal details
- Born: January 5, 1868 Boulder, Colorado, U.S.
- Died: January 15, 1937 (aged 69) Montrose, Colorado, U.S.
- Spouse: Patrick Tague
- Children: 5

Lydia Berkley Tague (January 5, 1868 – January 15, 1937) was an American jurist who served as a county judge in Eagle County, Colorado, from 1911 to 1924. On her appointment, she was described as the only woman in the United States to hold the position of county judge.

== Personal life ==
Lydia Berkley Tague was born in Boulder, Colorado, on January 5, 1868. She moved to Red Cliff at the age of 16 to live with her sister and brother-in-law. In 1889, she married Patrick Tague. They had five children. A Democrat and avid voter, Tague supported women's suffrage, noting that "[women] can't do any worse with the ballot than men have done". She died January 15, 1937, at St. Luke's hospital in Montrose, Colorado, after a stroke.

== Career ==
Tague's husband served as a county judge in Eagle County until his death on February 2, 1911, leaving the position vacant. Despite several male applicants, the county commission asked Tague to serve out the remainder of her husband's term. In February 1911, Lydia Tague became the country’s first female county judge.

Like her husband, Tague lacked formal education in law; after her appointment, she was dubbed "the common sense judge" by some members of the community.

Upon taking office, The Detroit Times described Tague as the only woman in the United States to hold the position. Tague's docket included probate, divorce, and criminal cases. Tague garnered publicity while presiding over a bootlegging trial, her role in which was largely complimentary. A report in the St. Louis Post Dispatch stated that Tague was “careful, conscientious and quick to grasp difficult points of law and technicalities, according to lawyers who have appeared before her.”

Tague was re-elected three times, serving until 1924 when she chose to not seek re-election. After stepping down from the bench, she clerked for Francis Eugene Bouck in the 5th district court until retiring due to poor health.
