= Dusk, West Virginia =

Unincorporated community in West Virginia, United States

- Unincorporated community
- Location within West Virginia Location within the United States
- Coordinates: 38°51′50″N 80°45′4″W
- Country: United States
- State: West Virginia
- County: Gilmer
- Elevation: 843 ft (257 m)
- Time zone: UTC-5 (Eastern (EST))
  - Summer (DST): UTC-4 (EDT)
- GNIS feature ID: 1689666

Dusk is an unincorporated community in Gilmer County, West Virginia, United States. The community was once served by a post office, though the location has since closed.
