= Samuel Shrewsbury Sr. House =

Historic house in West Virginia, United States

- Samuel Shrewsbury Sr.
- U.S. National Register of Historic Places
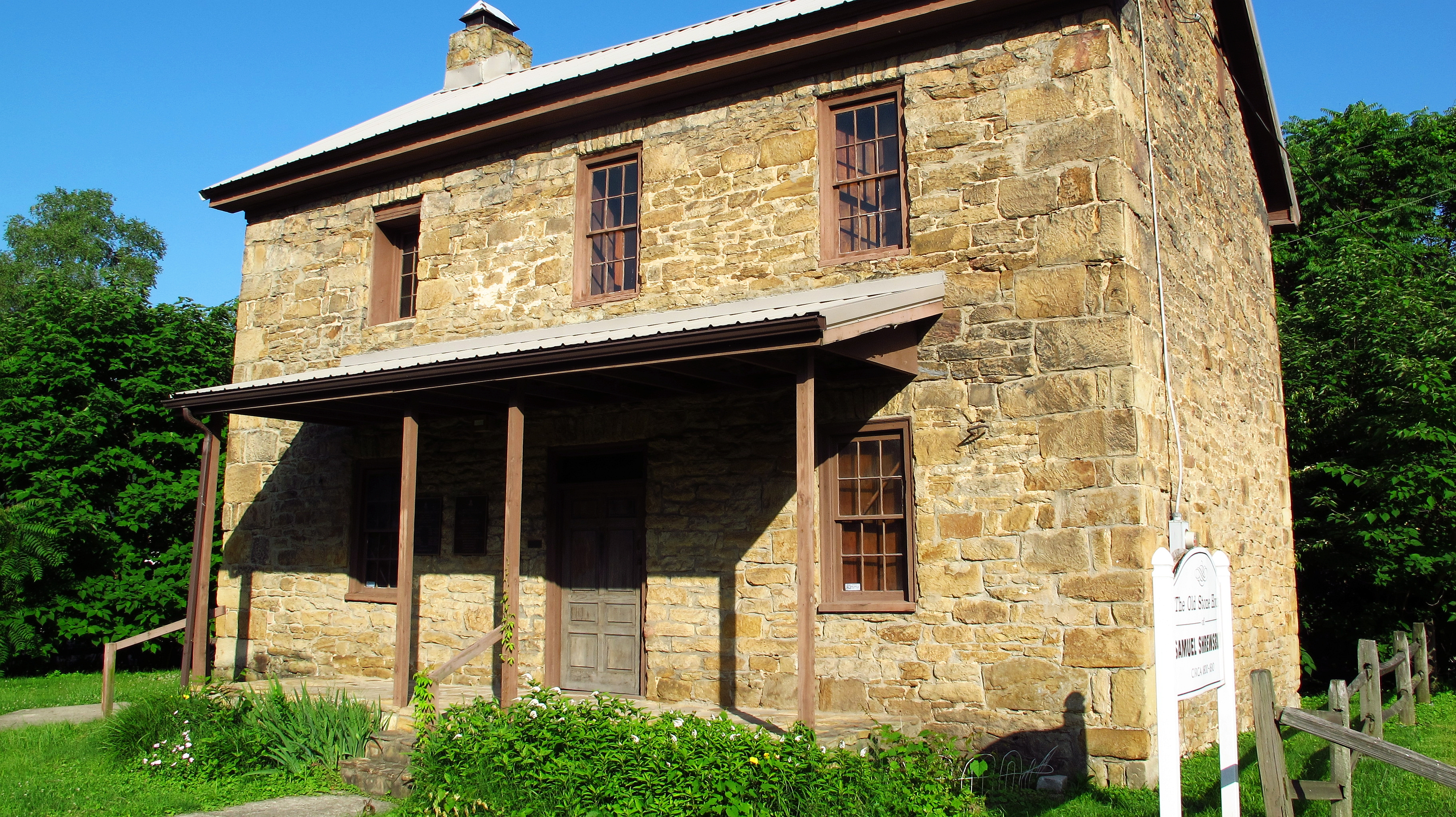

- Location within West Virginia Location within the United States
- Location: 310 Stubb Dr., Belle, West Virginia
- Coordinates: 38°14′15″N 81°32′39″W
- Area: 0.3 acres (0.12 ha)
- Built: c. 1810
- Architect: Shrewsbury, Samuel Sr.
- NRHP reference No.: 78002799
- Added to NRHP: November 2, 1978

This page is about the historic house in West Virginia, for the house in Madison, In, see: Charles L. Shrewsbury House Samuel Shrewsbury Sr. House, also known as the Old Stone House, is a historic home located at Belle, Kanawha County, West Virginia. It was built about 1810, and is a small single-pile sandstone building with a medium pitched gable roof. It is owned by the Belle Historical Restoration Society, Inc. and open as a historic house museum.

It was listed on the National Register of Historic Places in 1978.
