= Wilson School (Mannington, West Virginia) =

- U.S. National Register of Historic Places
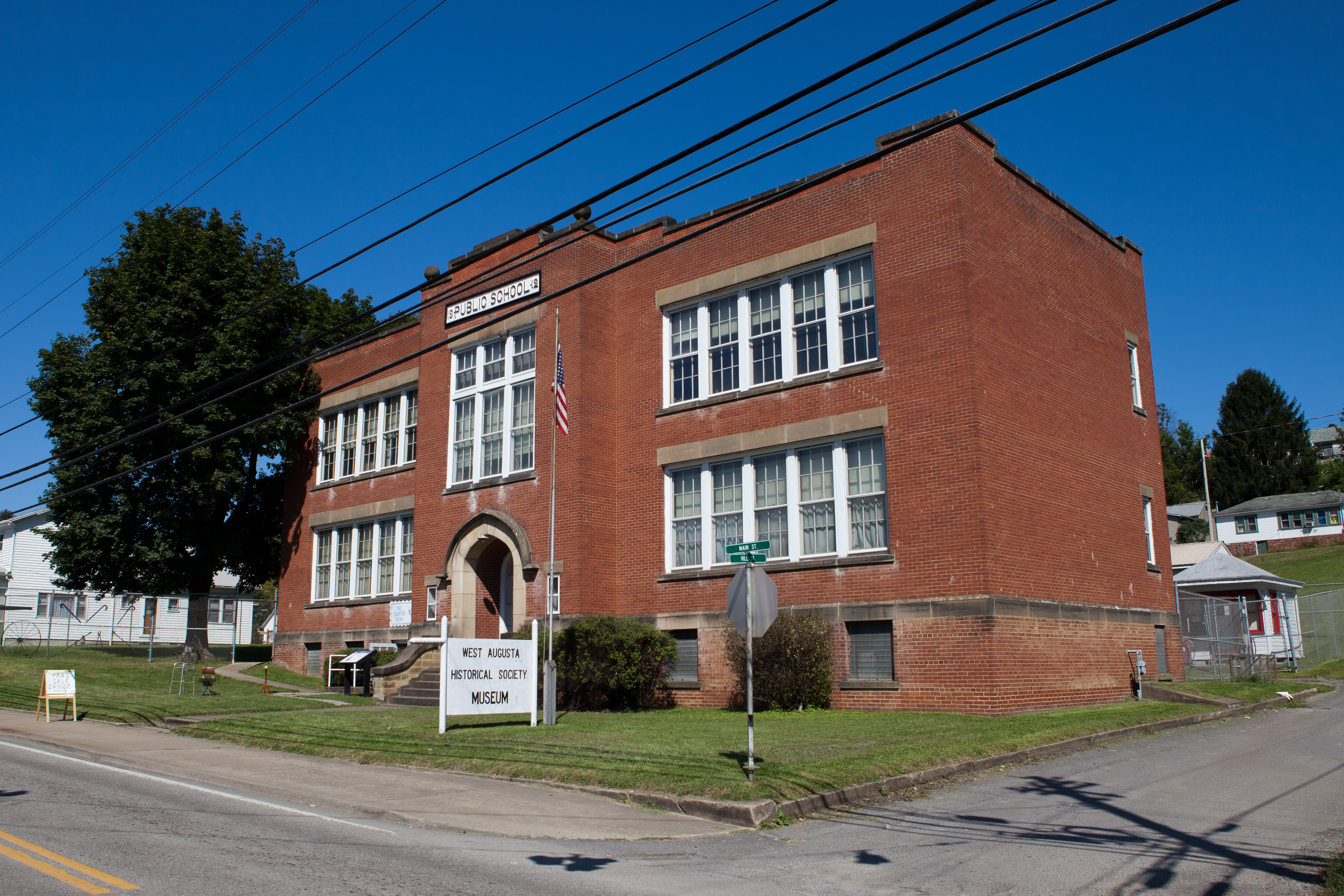

- Location within West Virginia Location within the United States
- Location: 917 E. Main St., Mannington, West Virginia
- Coordinates: 39°31′32″N 80°20′5″W
- Area: less than one acre
- Built: 1912
- Architectural style: Collegiate Gothic
- NRHP reference No.: 01001331
- Added to NRHP: November 29, 2001

Wilson School is a historic school building located at Mannington in Marion County, West Virginia, United States. It was built in 1912, and is a two-story, rectangular brick building with a raised basement. The symmetrical building has a flat roof and crenellated parapet with Collegiate Gothic detailing. The school closed in 1979, and is now occupied by the West Augusta Historical Society Museum. Other museum-related attractions on the property are the Price Log House (c. 1850) and a B&O Railroad Caboose (1912).

It was listed on the National Register of Historic Places in 2001.
