= Ruddell General Store =

- U.S. National Register of Historic Places
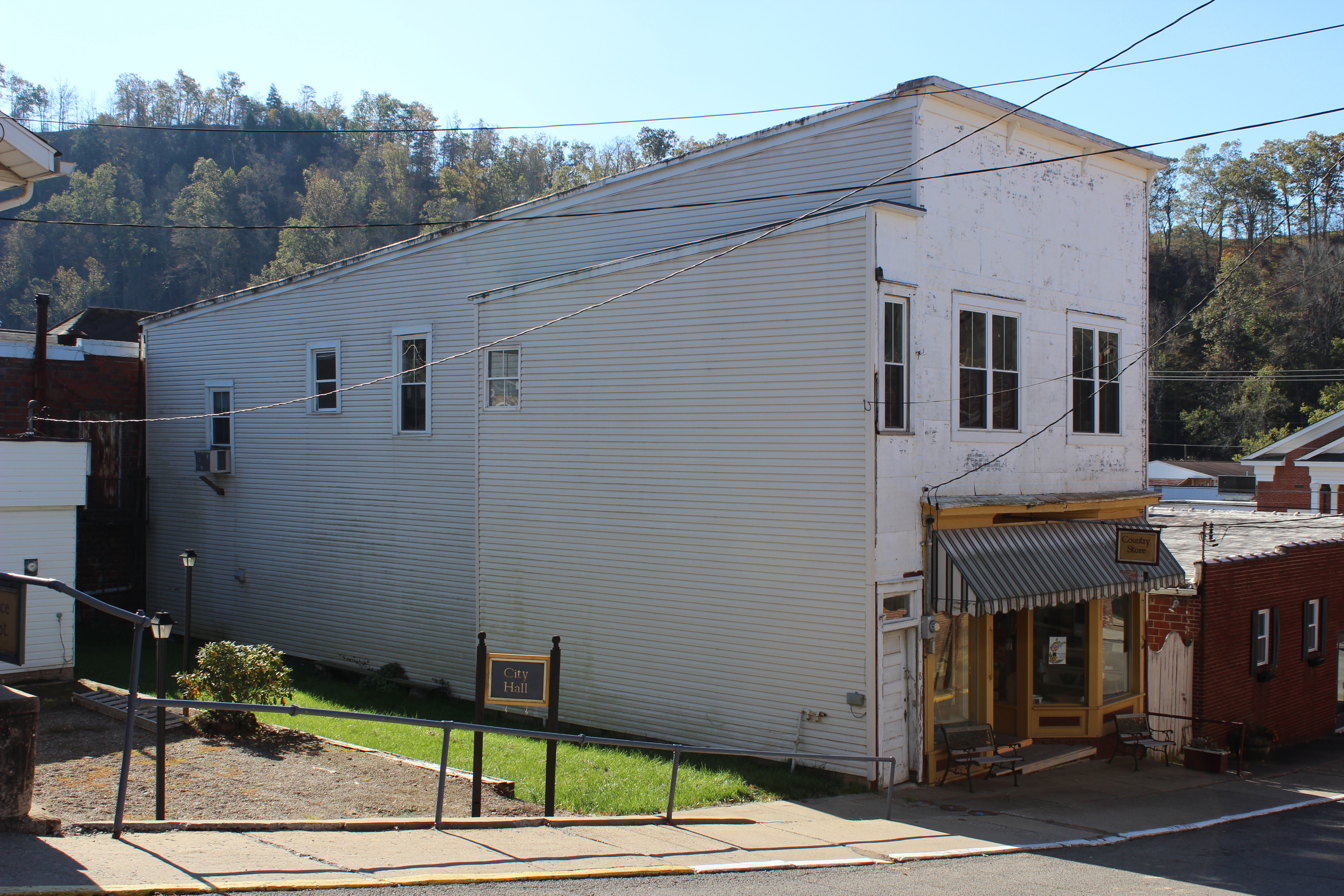

- Location within West Virginia Location within the United States
- Location: 6 Court St., Glenville, West Virginia
- Coordinates: 38°56′2″N 80°50′16″W
- Area: less than one acre
- Built: 1890
- Architectural style: Early Commercial
- NRHP reference No.: 98001469
- Added to NRHP: December 15, 1998

Ruddell General Store, also known as the Country Store Museum, is a historic general store building located at Glenville, Gilmer County, West Virginia. It was built in 1890, and is a two-story, two-bay, commercial building measuring 30 feet by 65 feet. The first story storefront is original material and design. It was occupied by a retail store until the 1970s, after which it was acquired by the West Virginia State Folk Festival, Inc., and open as the Country Store Museum.

It was listed on the National Register of Historic Places in 1998.
