= Watts Museum =

Royce J. and Caroline B. Watts Museum
- Location within West Virginia
- Established: 1986
- Location: 401 Evansdale Drive; Morgantown, West Virginia
- Coordinates: 39.6465°N 79.9739°W
- Type: Industry museum
- Website: wattsmuseum.wvu.edu

The Royce J. and Caroline B. Watts Museum (commonly known as Watts Museum) is a university museum on the Evansdale campus of West Virginia University, in Morgantown, West Virginia, United States.

Originally named the COMER Museum for West Virginia University's College of Mineral and Energy Resources (COMER, 1930–1995), the Watts Museum was renamed in 2005 at the request of the West Virginia Coal Mining Institute (WVCMI).

== History ==
The collections of what is now the Royce J. and Caroline B. Watts Museum, began prior to the establishment of the School of Mines, later named COMER, at West Virginia University in 1930 with the collection of flame safety lamps. Before the construction of the Mineral Resources Building (MRB) in 1991 these lamps were displayed in cases located in White Hall on the downtown campus of West Virginia University. When plans were made for the construction of the MRB in 1986, space for a museum and storage were included in the design plans and the COMER Museum was officially established.

In 2005, the museum was endowed by gifts from the WVCMI, the Watts family, and alumni and friends of West Virginia University Mineral Resources. WVCMI requested that the name of the COMER Museum be changed to the Royce J. and Caroline B. Watts Museum to recognize “two individuals who have tirelessly supported its mission through both financial support and other resources.” Royce J. Watts, a faculty member at West Virginia University for over fifty years, and his wife helped develop and establish the COMER Museum.

In 2012, the museum was awarded a grant from The West Virginia Humanities Council to support a coal mining educational outreach program for senior citizens in the area.

== Mission statement ==
The mission statement was written in the mid-1980s with the establishment of the COMER Museum.

“The purpose of the museum is to preserve and promote the social, cultural and technological history of the coal, oil and gas industries of the State of West Virginia through the collection, preservation, research, and exhibition of tangible objects relevant to these industries.”

== Collections ==
The Watts Museum's collection numbers in the thousands, relating to a variety of eras of the coal and petroleum industries. Most notable is one of the largest collections in the United States of flame safety lamps of over 100 different makes and styles. The museum also holds books, archival documents, and historical photographs.

Other items include, but are not limited to:

- Mine rescue equipment
- Canary cages
- Local and global rare minerals
- Mining and drilling artifacts
- Working scale models of mining equipment
- Historic photographs
- Early equipment items from the coal, oil and gas industries
- Personal effects of coal miners including clothing, lunch buckets, carbide lights, etc.
- Petroleum samples in various stages of refinement

The majority of the Watts Museum's collections have been donated by mining and petroleum companies and alumni of the college.

== Past Exhibits ==
=== Light/Lubricant/Liniment: The Early Years of Oil Production and Consumption in West Virginia, 1860–1900 ===
May 2010 – October 2010 Light/Lubricant/Liniment traced the development of West Virginia's oilfields after Edwin Drake drilled the first successful oil well in the United States in 1859 and explored the production and use of oil in late-19th-century America. The exhibit focused on the three main uses of liquid petroleum – lighting oil, lubricant oil, and medicinal oil. Displays included historical photographs, archival documents, model oil derricks, early drilling tools, kerosene lamps, and Standard Oil lubricant samples, among others.

=== Helmet Men: Mine Rescuers of Appalachia’s Coalfields ===
January 2011 – August 2011 Focusing on the role of mine rescue team members in the United States, Helmet Men acknowledged the role rescuers play in mining disasters. The exhibit included mine rescue equipment, historical photographs, and film footage of mine rescuers.

=== Defying the Darkness: The Struggle for Safe and Sufficient Mine Illumination ===
September 2011 – July 2012 Defying the Darkness traced the history of mine illumination from the perspectives of mining companies, miners, governments, and inventors. Objects on display included early oil lamps, enclosed-flame lamps, carbide lights, battery-powered cap lamps, and the flame safety lamp. The exhibit also included historical photographs.

=== The Story of Engineering: West Virginia University, 1887–2012 ===
August 2012 – July 2013 Celebrating 125 years of the engineering college at West Virginia University, The Story of Engineering focused on the curriculum, research, student body and facilities of the college. Included in the display were an appointment letter for the college's first dean, C.R. Jones; a computer storage device from 1958; and equipment from Mechanical Hall, which was destroyed by fire in 1956.

=== Outside the Mine: Daily Life in a Coal Camp ===
September 2013 – July 2014 Exploring West Virginia's coal industry, Outside the Mine focuses on the economic, social, domestic, and leisure aspects of the coal communities from the late 19th to the mid-20th centuries. The exhibit includes historical artifacts, such as a hand clothes wringer and scrip register, and historical photographs.
