= Belle, West Virginia =

- Town
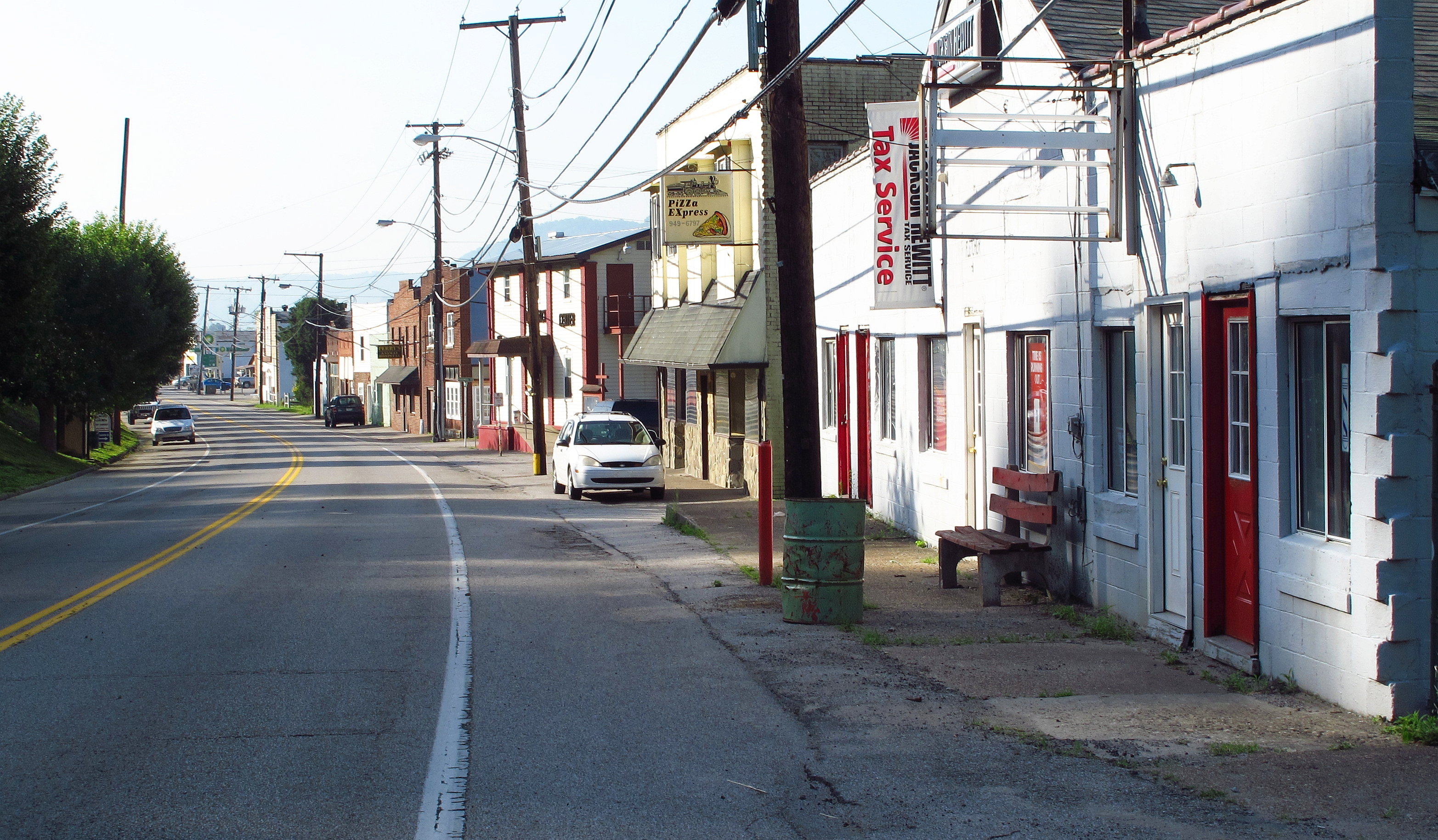
- West Dupont Avenue in Belle

- Logo

- Location of Belle in Kanawha County, West Virginia.
- Coordinates: 38°14′2″N 81°32′30″W
- Country: United States
- State: West Virginia
- County: Kanawha
- Incorporated: September 23, 1958

Government
  - Mayor: David Fletcher
  - Recorder: Jon Syner

Area
  - Total: 0.78 sq mi (2.02 km^{2})
  - Land: 0.69 sq mi (1.79 km^{2})
  - Water: 0.089 sq mi (0.23 km^{2})
- Elevation: 600 ft (183 m)

Population (2020)
  - Total: 1,169
  - Estimate (2021): 1,146
  - Density: 1,600/sq mi (630/km^{2})
- Time zone: UTC-5 (Eastern (EST))
  - Summer (DST): UTC-4 (EDT)
- ZIP code: 25015
- Area code: 304
- FIPS code: 54-05836
- GNIS feature ID: 1553846
- Website: www.townofbellewv.com

Belle is a town in Kanawha County, West Virginia, United States, situated along the Kanawha River. The population was 1,171 at the 2020 census. Belle was incorporated on December 13, 1958, by the Kanawha County Circuit Court. It is the home of the Belle Bulldogs Elementary School.

Belle Reynolds, an early postmaster, gave the town her first name.

== Geography ==
According to the United States Census Bureau, the town has a total area of 0.78 square miles (2.02 km^{2}), of which 0.69 square miles (1.79 km^{2}) is land and 0.09 square miles (0.23 km^{2}) is water.

=== Pollution ===
Pollution had been noted in the air and water around Belle between 1988 and 2002, caused by the DuPont facility located there. Water releases of pollutants from the facility increased by 385%, and air releases decreased by 94.3%, during that time period.

== History ==
On December 8, 2020, at approximately 10 pm, an explosion occurred at the Optima Chemical Plant in the town, promoting a shelter-in-place to be issued for the town and surrounding areas. The explosion left one dead and three injured.

== Demographics ==
Historical population
Census	Pop.	Note	%±
1960	2,559		—
1970	1,786		−30.2%
1980	1,621		−9.2%
1990	1,421		−12.3%
2000	1,259		−11.4%
2010	1,260		0.1%
2020	1,169		−7.2%
2021 (est.)	1,146	▼	−2.0%
U.S. Decennial Census

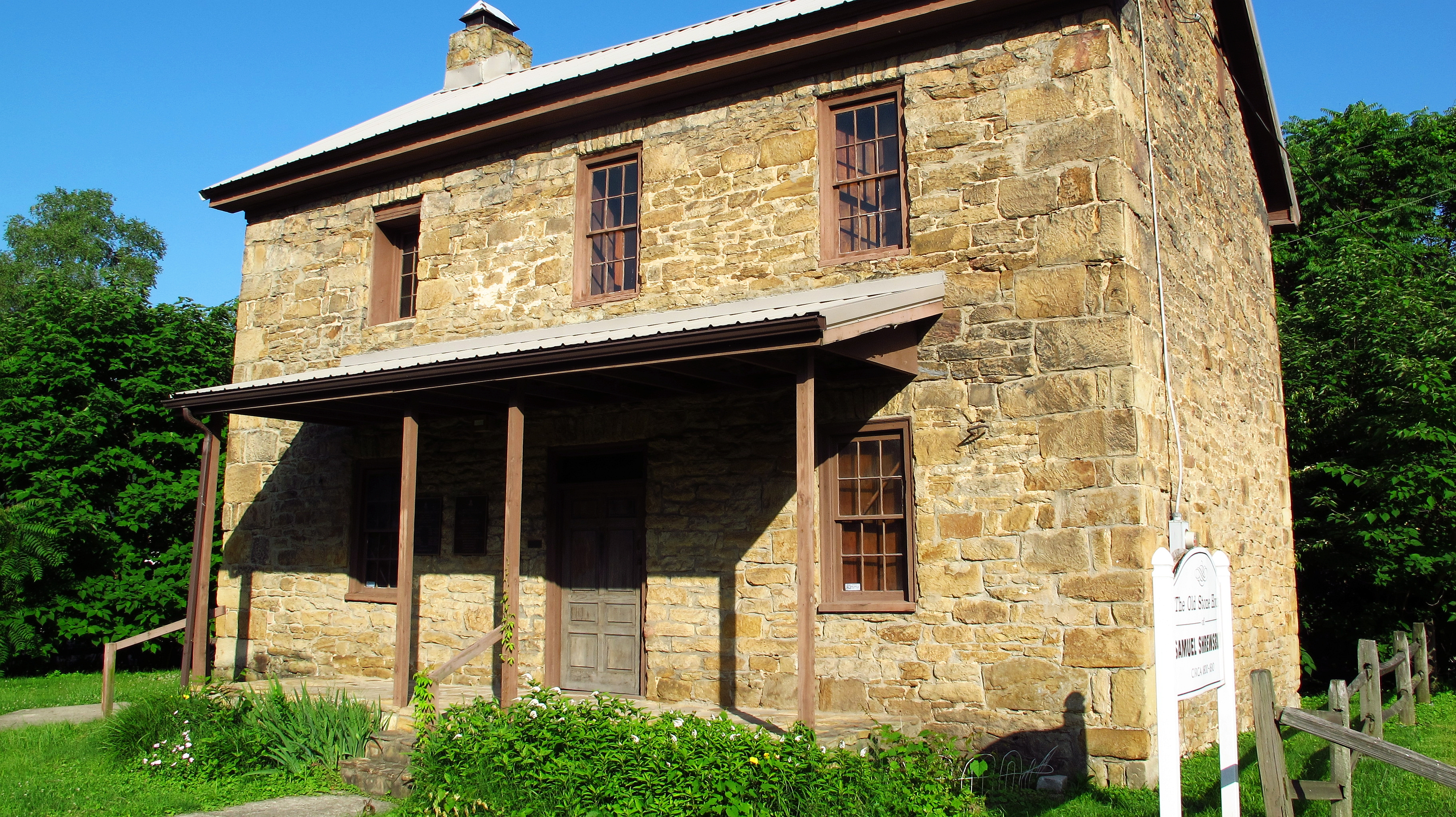
The Samuel Shrewsbury Sr. House in Belle is listed on the National Register of Historic Places

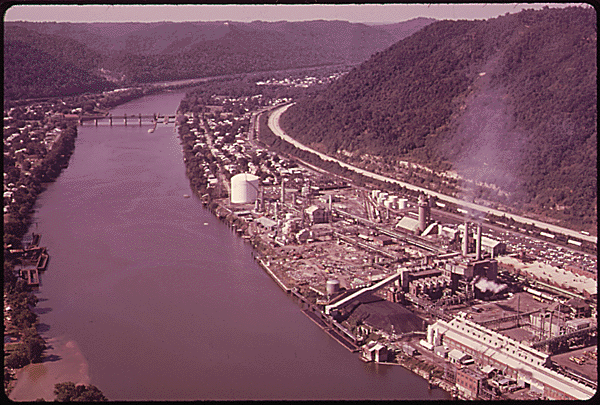
DuPont Belle Works on US Route 60 at Belle, June 1973

=== 2010 census ===
At the 2010 census there were 1,260 people, 571 households, and 365 families living in the town. The population density was 1,826.1 inhabitants per square mile (705.1/km^{2}). There were 639 housing units at an average density of 926.1 per square mile (357.6/km^{2}). The racial makeup of the town was 97.7% White, 0.6% African American, 0.2% Native American, 0.3% Asian, 0.1% from other races, and 1.1% from two or more races. Hispanic or Latino of any race were 1.3%.

Of the 571 households 28.4% had children under the age of 18 living with them, 43.4% were married couples living together, 15.8% had a female householder with no husband present, 4.7% had a male householder with no wife present, and 36.1% were non-families. 34.2% of households were one person and 14.8% were one person aged 65 or older. The average household size was 2.21 and the average family size was 2.77.

The median age in the town was 43.1 years. 20.3% of residents were under the age of 18; 7.5% were between the ages of 18 and 24; 24.8% were from 25 to 44; 28.6% were from 45 to 64; and 18.8% were 65 or older. The gender makeup of the town was 45.4% male and 54.6% female.

=== 2000 census ===
At the 2000 census there were 1,259 people, 569 households, and 364 families living in the town. The population density was 1,766.2 inhabitants per square mile (684.7/km^{2}). There were 647 housing units at an average density of 907.7 per square mile (351.8/km^{2}). The racial makeup of the town was 95.31% White, 0.87% African American, 0.24% Native American, 0.87% from other races, and 2.70% from two or more races. Hispanic or Latino of any race were 1.27%.

Of the 569 households 24.4% had children under the age of 18 living with them, 46.7% were married couples living together, 14.1% had a female householder with no husband present, and 35.9% were non-families. 32.7% of households were one person and 14.6% were one person aged 65 or older. The average household size was 2.21 and the average family size was 2.79.

The age distribution was 20.8% under the age of 18, 7.4% from 18 to 24, 26.1% from 25 to 44, 26.6% from 45 to 64, and 19.1% 65 or older. The median age was 42 years. For every 100 females, there were 84.1 males. For every 100 females age 18 and over, there were 78.0 males.

The median household income was $34,118 and the median family income was $43,203. Males had a median income of $27,500 versus $22,969 for females. The per capita income for the town was $18,636. About 8.6% of families and 11.5% of the population were below the poverty line, including 15.7% of those under age 18 and 5.6% of those age 65 or over.

== Sports ==
Belle is home to the women's tackle football team West Virginia Wildfire.

== Notable people ==
- Jason Williams, NBA player
- Randy Moss, NFL player
