= Tague, West Virginia =

Tague
- Unincorporated community
- Location within the state of West Virginia Tague (the United States)
- Coordinates: 38°42′6″N 80°54′55″W
- Country: United States
- State: West Virginia
- County: Braxton
- Time zone: UTC-5 (Eastern (EST))
  - Summer (DST): UTC-4 (EDT)

Tague is an unincorporated community in Braxton County, West Virginia, United States, along the Right Fork Steer Creek. The community took its name from nearby Tague Fork creek. A post office was established in Tague in 1911, but was downgraded as an independent rural station of Frametown. It is believed to be the only location in the United States with that name.
