= Rosedale, Colorado =

Former municipality in Colorado, United States

Coordinates: 40°23′07″N 104°41′53″W

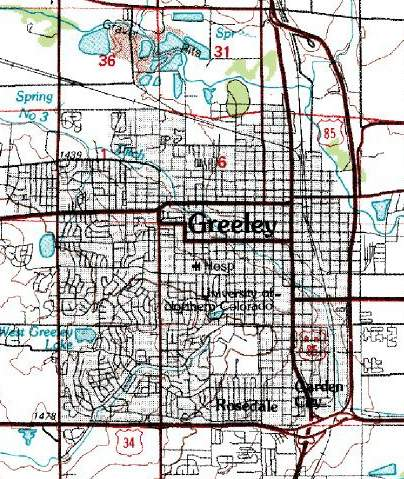
1976 USGS map showing Rosedale, Colorado

Rosedale, Colorado is a former municipality in Weld County, Colorado, United States, now a part of the City of Greeley.

Rosedale was founded and incorporated in 1939 to allow the establishment of saloons, bars, and liquor stores to serve the Greeley community; Greeley, established as part of the Union Temperance Colony, was dry. Located on the south side of Greeley and southwest of Colorado State College of Education (today the University of Northern Colorado), the town together with its sister town, Garden City provided a watering hole for the teachers-in-training and faculty of the college and the rest of the population of Greeley.

Today the name is remembered primarily through the name of its original "family" shopping center on 11th Avenue on the south edge of Greeley and just north of the separate city of Evans.
