= Westfall Fork =

Stream in West Virginia, U.S.

Coordinates: 38°46′06″N 80°41′32″W

Westfall Fork is a stream in the U.S. state of West Virginia.

Westfall Fork most likely was named after a man named Westfall who was known to have settled in the area in the 1770s.

== See also ==
- List of rivers of West Virginia
