= Rosedale, West Virginia =

- Unincorporated community
- Location within West Virginia Location within the United States
- Coordinates: 38°44′21″N 80°56′34″W
- Country: United States
- State: West Virginia
- County: Braxton and Gilmer
- Incorporated: 1911
- Elevation: 778 ft (237 m)
- Time zone: UTC-5 (Eastern (EST))
  - Summer (DST): UTC-4 (EDT)
- ZIP codes: 26636
- GNIS feature ID: 1546077

Rosedale is an unincorporated community in Braxton and Gilmer counties in the U.S. state of West Virginia. It lies along the Right Fork Steer Creek, at an elevation of 778 feet (237 m).

== History ==
The community was named after wild rose bushes near the original town site. Rosedale was incorporated in 1911.
