= Cedar Creek State Park =

State Park in Gilmer County, West Virginia

- IUCN category III (natural monument or feature)
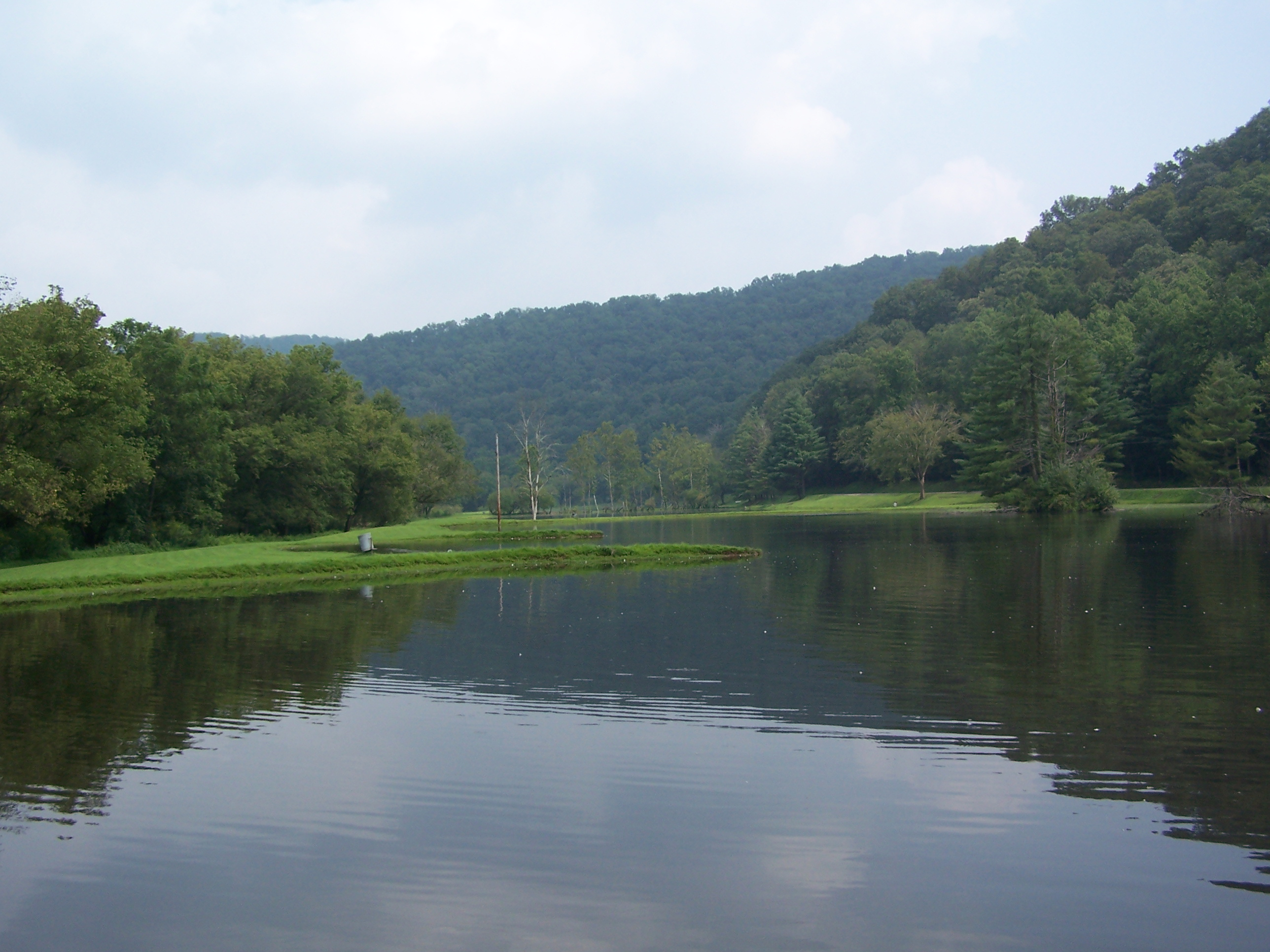
- Cedar Creek State Park has lakes for fishing and boating.

- Location within West Virginia
- Location: Gilmer, West Virginia, United States
- Coordinates: 38°52′55″N 80°51′43″W
- Area: 2,588 acres (10.47 km^{2})
- Elevation: 1,010 ft (310 m)
- Established: 1955
- Named for: Cedar Creek
- Governing body: West Virginia Division of Natural Resources
- Website: wvstateparks.com/park/cedar-creek-state-park/

Cedar Creek State Park is sited on 2,588 acres (1,047 ha) along Cedar Creek in Gilmer County, West Virginia, located about 4 miles (6.4 km) south of Glenville. Two of the buildings at the park are historical restorations of West Virginia's pioneer days, including a log cabin now used as the campground check-in station, and the Pine Run One Room School, an old one-room schoolhouse complete with restored school desks and potbellied stove. The schoolhouse is open for tours on Saturdays in the summer.

== Features ==
- 65 camping sites featuring water and electric (no full hookups)
- 2 Dump Stations are available at the camp office
- Swimming pool
- Picnic area with shelters
- 3 fishing lakes
- Paddleboat rentals
- Miniature golf
- Camp store

== Accessibility ==
Accessibility for the disabled was assessed by West Virginia University. The assessment Cedar Creek State Park to be generally accessible. The 2005 evaluation found issues regarding signage in a parking lot, and also found that assistance may be needed to access the ramp to the swimming pool and a pond.

== See also ==
- List of West Virginia state parks
- State park
