= Pennsboro, West Virginia =

City in West Virginia, US

- City
- Location of Pennsboro in Ritchie County, West Virginia.
- Coordinates: 39°17′1″N 80°58′2″W
- Country: United States
- State: West Virginia
- County: Ritchie

Area
  - Total: 2.72 sq mi (7.05 km^{2})
  - Land: 2.70 sq mi (6.99 km^{2})
  - Water: 0.023 sq mi (0.06 km^{2})
- Elevation: 866 ft (264 m)

Population (2020)
  - Total: 1,054
  - Estimate (2021): 1,040
  - Density: 371.7/sq mi (143.52/km^{2})
- Time zone: UTC-5 (Eastern (EST))
  - Summer (DST): UTC-4 (EDT)
- ZIP code: 26415
- Area code: 304
- FIPS code: 54-62764
- GNIS feature ID: 1544704
- Website: local.wv.gov/Pennsboro

Pennsboro is a city in Ritchie County, West Virginia, United States. The population was 1,050 at the 2020 census. The city is located at the junction of U.S. Route 50 and West Virginia Route 74; the North Bend Rail Trail also passes through the city.

The town was platted circa 1820 by Charles Penn, and named for him.

== Geography ==
Pennsboro is located at 39°17′1″N 80°58′2″W (39.283528, -80.967097).

According to the United States Census Bureau, the city has a total area of 2.73 square miles (7.07 km^{2}), of which 2.70 square miles (6.99 km^{2}) is land and 0.03 square miles (0.08 km^{2}) is water.

== Demographics ==
Historical population
Census	Pop.	Note	%±
1880	330		—
1890	570		72.7%
1900	738		29.5%
1910	930		26.0%
1920	1,654		77.8%
1930	1,616		−2.3%
1940	1,738		7.5%
1950	1,753		0.9%
1960	1,660		−5.3%
1970	1,614		−2.8%
1980	1,652		2.4%
1990	1,282		−22.4%
2000	1,199		−6.5%
2010	1,171		−2.3%
2020	1,054		−10.0%
2021 (est.)	1,040		−1.3%
U.S. Decennial Census

=== 2020 census ===
As of the 2020 census, Pennsboro had a population of 1,054. The median age was 43.1 years. 22.4% of residents were under the age of 18 and 19.4% of residents were 65 years of age or older. For every 100 females there were 97.0 males, and for every 100 females age 18 and over there were 95.7 males age 18 and over.

0.0% of residents lived in urban areas, while 100.0% lived in rural areas.

There were 450 households in Pennsboro, of which 30.0% had children under the age of 18 living in them. Of all households, 44.0% were married-couple households, 20.0% were households with a male householder and no spouse or partner present, and 28.9% were households with a female householder and no spouse or partner present. About 31.4% of all households were made up of individuals and 16.4% had someone living alone who was 65 years of age or older.

There were 523 housing units, of which 14.0% were vacant. The homeowner vacancy rate was 1.5% and the rental vacancy rate was 13.2%.

Racial composition as of the 2020 census
Race	Number	Percent
White	1,019	96.7%
Black or African American	1	0.1%
American Indian and Alaska Native	0	0.0%
Asian	3	0.3%
Native Hawaiian and Other Pacific Islander	2	0.2%
Some other race	2	0.2%
Two or more races	27	2.6%
Hispanic or Latino (of any race)	7	0.7%

=== 2010 census ===
At the 2010 census there were 1,171 people, 522 households, and 312 families living in the city. The population density was 433.7 inhabitants per square mile (167.5/km^{2}). There were 590 housing units at an average density of 218.5 per square mile (84.4/km^{2}). The racial makeup of the city was 97.9% White, 0.3% African American, 0.5% Native American, 0.1% Asian, 0.4% from other races, and 0.9% from two or more races. Hispanic or Latino of any race were 1.0%.

Of the 522 households 27.0% had children under the age of 18 living with them, 41.6% were married couples living together, 14.0% had a female householder with no husband present, 4.2% had a male householder with no wife present, and 40.2% were non-families. 34.5% of households were one person and 14.1% were one person aged 65 or older. The average household size was 2.24 and the average family size was 2.85.

The median age was 41.7 years. 21.7% of residents were under the age of 18; 8% were between the ages of 18 and 24; 24.8% were from 25 to 44; 28.5% were from 45 to 64; and 16.9% were 65 or older. The gender makeup of the city was 46.9% male and 53.1% female.

=== 2000 census ===
At the 2000 census there were 1,199 people, 515 households, and 340 families living in the city. The population density was 550.8 inhabitants per square mile (212.7/km^{2}). There were 604 housing units at an average density of 277.5 per square mile (107.1/km^{2}). The racial makeup of the city was 98.67% White, 0.25% African American, 0.42% Native American, and 0.67% from two or more races. Hispanic or Latino of any race were 0.75%.

Of the 515 households 28.5% had children under the age of 18 living with them, 51.5% were married couples living together, 10.9% had a female householder with no husband present, and 33.8% were non-families. 30.3% of households were one person and 16.3% were one person aged 65 or older. The average household size was 2.33 and the average family size was 2.89.

The age distribution was 22.9% under the age of 18, 7.8% from 18 to 24, 26.5% from 25 to 44, 25.9% from 45 to 64, and 16.9% 65 or older. The median age was 40 years. For every 100 females, there were 92.1 males. For every 100 females age 18 and over, there were 88.8 males.

The median household income was $24,120 and the median family income was $30,313. Males had a median income of $26,964 versus $20,714 for females. The per capita income for the city was $14,325. About 16.5% of families and 21.4% of the population were below the poverty line, including 33.1% of those under age 18 and 10.2% of those age 65 or over.
