= Gilmer County, West Virginia =

County in West Virginia, United States

- County
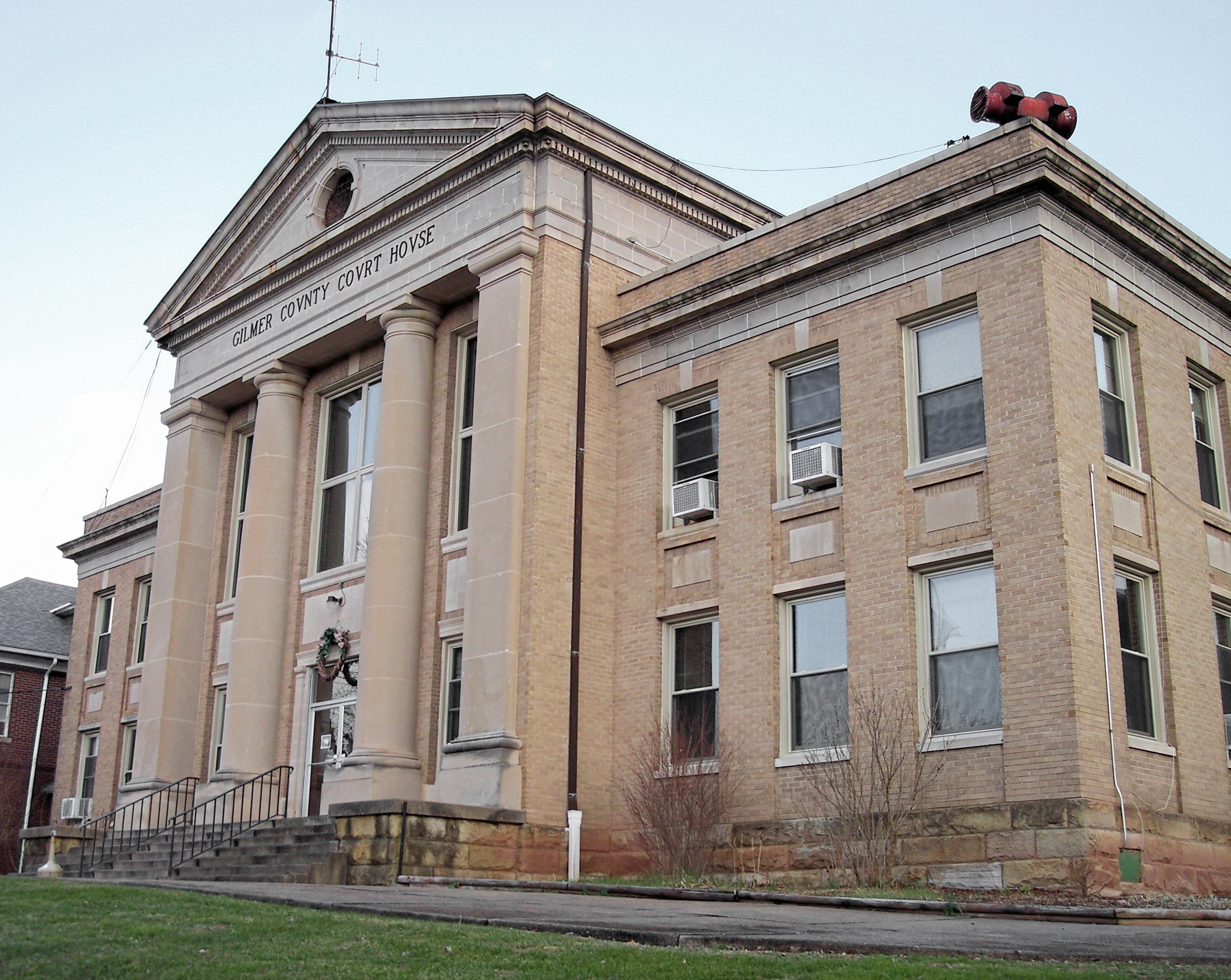
- The Gilmer County Courthouse in Glenville

- Seal

- Location within the U.S. state of West Virginia
- Coordinates: 38°55′N 80°51′W
- Country: United States
- State: West Virginia
- Founded: February 3, 1845
- Named for: Thomas Walker Gilmer
- Seat: Glenville
- Largest town: Glenville

Area
  - Total: 340 sq mi (880 km^{2})
  - Land: 339 sq mi (880 km^{2})
  - Water: 1.6 sq mi (4.1 km^{2}) 0.5%

Population (2020)
  - Total: 7,408
  - Estimate (2025): 7,085 ▼
  - Density: 21.9/sq mi (8.44/km^{2})
- Time zone: UTC−5 (Eastern)
  - Summer (DST): UTC−4 (EDT)
- Congressional district: 1st
- Website: gilmercounty.wv.gov

Gilmer County is a county in the U.S. state of West Virginia. As of the 2020 census, the population was 7,408, making it West Virginia's fifth-least populous county. Its county seat is Glenville. The county was formed in 1845 from parts of Lewis and Kanawha Counties, and named for Thomas Walker Gilmer, Governor of Virginia from 1840 to 1841. Gilmer was later a representative in the United States Congress and Secretary of the Navy in President John Tyler's cabinet.

Cedar Creek State Park offers camping, fishing, swimming, and hiking. The West Virginia State Folk Festival is held each June. Glenville State University has a community activity center, a state-of-the-art library, and a complete collection of hand-carved, West Virginia–native birds on public display. The Gilmer County Recreation Center Complex includes a small golf course, a convention / reunion hall, and bunk houses. Gilmer County is home to ten nationally registered historic landmarks, the Cedar Creek Backway, and the annual West Virginia Folk Festival. Media outlets for the community include The Glenville Democrat and The Glenville Pathfinder, the county's two newspapers.

Gilmer County is also the site of Federal Correctional Institution, Gilmer, a federal medium security prison for men and the county's largest employer.

As of 2023, Gilmer County has one permanent traffic light. It is located in the town of Glenville.

== Geography ==
According to the United States Census Bureau, the county has a total area of 340 square miles (880 km^{2}), of which 339 square miles (880 km^{2}) is land and 1.6 square miles (4.1 km^{2}) (0.5%) is water.

In 1863, West Virginia's counties were divided into civil townships, with the intention of encouraging local government. This proved impractical in the heavily rural state, and in 1872 the townships were converted into magisterial districts. Gilmer County was divided into four districts: Centre, (Note: Spelled "Center" by 1890.) De Kalb, Glenville, and Troy. In the 1980s, De Kalb and Troy Districts were combined to form De Kalb-Troy District, and a new district, City, was established.

=== Major highways ===
- U.S. Highway 33
- U.S. Highway 119
- West Virginia Route 5
- West Virginia Route 18
- West Virginia Route 47
- West Virginia Route 74
- Interstate 79 (No exits within county)

=== Adjacent counties ===
- Doddridge County (north)
- Lewis County (east)
- Braxton County (south)
- Calhoun County (west)
- Ritchie County (northwest)

== Demographics ==
Historical population
Census	Pop.	Note	%±
1850	3,475		—
1860	3,759		8.2%
1870	4,338		15.4%
1880	7,108		63.9%
1890	9,746		37.1%
1900	11,762		20.7%
1910	11,379		−3.3%
1920	10,668		−6.2%
1930	10,641		−0.3%
1940	12,046		13.2%
1950	9,746		−19.1%
1960	8,050		−17.4%
1970	7,782		−3.3%
1980	8,334		7.1%
1990	7,669		−8.0%
2000	7,160		−6.6%
2010	8,693		21.4%
2020	7,408		−14.8%
2025 (est.)	7,085	▼	−4.4%
U.S. Decennial Census; 1790–1960 1900–1990; 1990–2000 2010–2020

=== 2020 census ===
As of the 2020 census, the county had a population of 7,408. Of the residents, 15.3% were under the age of 18 and 18.1% were 65 years of age or older; the median age was 42.5 years. For every 100 females there were 153.4 males, and for every 100 females age 18 and over there were 159.9 males.

The racial makeup of the county was 84.0% White, 12.6% Black or African American, 0.1% American Indian and Alaska Native, 0.4% Asian, 0.1% from some other race, and 2.7% from two or more races. Hispanic or Latino residents of any race comprised 3.3% of the population.

There were 2,522 households in the county, of which 25.0% had children under the age of 18 living with them and 24.0% had a female householder with no spouse or partner present. About 30.3% of all households were made up of individuals and 13.6% had someone living alone who was 65 years of age or older.

There were 3,090 housing units, of which 18.4% were vacant. Among occupied housing units, 72.4% were owner-occupied and 27.6% were renter-occupied. The homeowner vacancy rate was 2.1% and the rental vacancy rate was 10.8%.

Gilmer County, West Virginia – Racial and ethnic composition Note: the US Census treats Hispanic/Latino as an ethnic category. This table excludes Latinos from the racial categories and assigns them to a separate category. Hispanics/Latinos may be of any race.
Race / Ethnicity (NH = Non-Hispanic)	Pop 2000	Pop 2010	Pop 2020	% 2000	% 2010	% 2020
White alone (NH)	6,936	6,952	6,026	96.87%	79.97%	81.34%
Black or African American alone (NH)	64	1,048	923	0.89%	12.05%	12.45%
Native American or Alaska Native alone (NH)	14	28	11	0.19%	0.32%	0.14%
Asian alone (NH)	40	34	30	0.55%	0.39%	0.40%
Pacific Islander alone (NH)	1	11	0	0.01%	0.12%	0.00%
Other race alone (NH)	4	5	1	0.05%	0.05%	0.01%
Mixed race or Multiracial (NH)	51	122	173	0.71%	1.40%	2.33%
Hispanic or Latino (any race)	50	493	244	0.69%	5.67%	3.29%
Total	7,160	8,693	7,408	100.00%	100.00%	100.00%

=== 2010 census ===
As of the 2010 United States census, there were 8,693 people, 2,753 households, and 1,806 families living in the county. The population density was 25.7 inhabitants per square mile (9.9/km^{2}). There were 3,448 housing units at an average density of 10.2 per square mile (3.9/km^{2}). The racial makeup of the county was 82.5% white, 12.3% black or African American, 0.5% American Indian, 0.4% Asian, 0.1% Pacific islander, 2.4% from other races, and 1.7% from two or more races. Those of Hispanic or Latino origin made up 5.7% of the population. In terms of ancestry, 23.1% were German, 14.9% were Irish, 9.6% were American, and 6.1% were English.

Of the 2,753 households, 25.9% had children under the age of 18 living with them, 49.8% were married couples living together, 10.1% had a female householder with no husband present, 34.4% were non-families, and 27.6% of all households were made up of individuals. The average household size was 2.34 and the average family size was 2.83. The median age was 38.0 years.

The median income for a household in the county was $29,706 and the median income for a family was $38,044. Males had a median income of $30,654 versus $16,834 for females. The per capita income for the county was $13,899. About 25.1% of families and 30.3% of the population were below the poverty line, including 39.4% of those under age 18 and 13.1% of those age 65 or over.

=== 2000 census ===
As of the census of 2000, there were 7,160 people, 2,768 households, and 1,862 families living in the county. The population density was 21 people per square mile (8.1 people/km^{2}). There were 3,621 housing units at an average density of 11 per square mile (4.2/km^{2}). The racial makeup of the county was 97.33% White, 0.91% Black or African American, 0.20% Native American, 0.57% Asian, 0.01% Pacific Islander, 0.10% from other races, and 0.88% from two or more races. 0.70% of the population were Hispanic or Latino of any race.

There were 2,768 households, out of which 28.20% had children under the age of 18 living with them, 54.40% were married couples living together, 8.60% had a female householder with no husband present, and 32.70% were non-families. 25.50% of all households were made up of individuals, and 12.30% had someone living alone who was 65 years of age or older. The average household size was 2.43 and the average family size was 2.92.

In the county, the population was spread out, with 20.30% under the age of 18, 16.40% from 18 to 24, 24.50% from 25 to 44, 23.50% from 45 to 64, and 15.30% who were 65 years of age or older. The median age was 37 years. For every 100 females there were 101.10 males. For every 100 females age 18 and over, there were 101.40 males.

The median income for a household in the county was $22,857, and the median income for a family was $28,685. Males had a median income of $25,497 versus $15,353 for females. The per capita income for the county was $12,498. About 20.20% of families and 25.90% of the population were below the poverty line, including 27.70% of those under age 18 and 8.90% of those age 65 or over.

== Politics ==
Historically, Gilmer County was the northwesternmost of the fiercely Democratic, secessionist counties of West Virginia. It voted Democratic in every election from 1872 to 1968 – in 1928 when there was large-scale anti-Catholic voting throughout Appalachian West Virginia it was Al Smith’s strongest county in the state. In 1972, against the strongly left-wing George McGovern, Richard Nixon became the first Republican to carry the county in 104 years, and in a similar landslide Ronald Reagan repeated this in 1984. Like all of West Virginia, since 2000 Gilmer County has seen a powerful swing towards the Republican Party due to declining unionization and differences with the Democratic Party's liberal views.

United States presidential election results for Gilmer County, West Virginia
Year	Republican		Democratic		Third party(ies)	
Year	No.	%	No.	%	No.	%
1912	469	18.76%	1,493	59.72%	538	21.52%
1916	943	35.63%	1,695	64.03%	9	0.34%
1920	1,635	46.58%	1,854	52.82%	21	0.60%
1924	1,570	36.09%	2,750	63.22%	30	0.69%
1928	1,705	42.16%	2,313	57.20%	26	0.64%
1932	1,530	30.13%	3,511	69.14%	37	0.73%
1936	1,858	35.12%	3,433	64.88%	0	0.00%
1940	2,067	38.69%	3,276	61.31%	0	0.00%
1944	1,651	39.69%	2,509	60.31%	0	0.00%
1948	1,421	37.63%	2,355	62.37%	0	0.00%
1952	1,813	44.18%	2,291	55.82%	0	0.00%
1956	1,774	46.81%	2,016	53.19%	0	0.00%
1960	1,446	41.07%	2,075	58.93%	0	0.00%
1964	1,116	28.27%	2,832	71.73%	0	0.00%
1968	1,401	43.82%	1,582	49.48%	214	6.69%
1972	2,056	60.20%	1,359	39.80%	0	0.00%
1976	1,371	37.91%	2,245	62.09%	0	0.00%
1980	1,452	41.65%	1,854	53.18%	180	5.16%
1984	1,953	56.58%	1,494	43.28%	5	0.14%
1988	1,387	45.27%	1,661	54.21%	16	0.52%
1992	1,085	34.40%	1,576	49.97%	493	15.63%
1996	933	35.22%	1,390	52.47%	326	12.31%
2000	1,560	56.93%	1,092	39.85%	88	3.21%
2004	1,665	58.38%	1,159	40.64%	28	0.98%
2008	1,445	57.32%	1,004	39.83%	72	2.86%
2012	1,595	63.24%	840	33.31%	87	3.45%
2016	1,896	73.52%	545	21.13%	138	5.35%
2020	2,012	75.58%	599	22.50%	51	1.92%
2024	1,822	77.73%	486	20.73%	36	1.54%

== Communities ==
=== Towns ===
- Glenville (county seat)
- Sand Fork

=== Magisterial districts ===
- Center
- City
- De Kalb-Troy
- Glenville

=== Unincorporated communities ===
- Baldwin
- Cedarville
- Coxs Mills
- Dusk
- Gilmer
- Letter Gap
- Linn
- Normantown
- Rosedale
- Shock
- Stouts Mills
- Stumptown
- Tanner
- Troy

== See also ==
- Gilmer County Schools
- Cedar Creek State Park
- National Register of Historic Places listings in Gilmer County, West Virginia
- Stumptown Wildlife Management Area
