= List of Baetis species =

This is a list of 162 species in Baetis, a genus of small minnow mayflies in the family Baetidae.

== Baetis species ==
- Baetis acceptus Müller-Liebenau & Hubbard, 1985^{c g}
- Baetis aculeatus Navás, 1915^{c g}
- Baetis acuminatus Gose, 1980^{c g}
- Baetis adonis Traver, 1935^{i c g}
- Baetis aeneus Navás, 1936^{c g}
- Baetis alius Day, 1954^{i c g b}
- Baetis alpinus (Pictet, 1843)^{c g}
- Baetis atrebatinus
- Baetis andalusicus Navás, 1911^{c g}
- Baetis atlanticus Soldán & Godunko, 2006^{c g}
- Baetis baksan Soldán, 1977^{c g}
- Baetis baroukianus Thomas & Dia, 1984^{c g}
- Baetis berberus Thomas, 1986^{c g}
- Baetis beskidensis Sowa, 1972^{c g}
- Baetis bicaudatus Dodds, 1923^{i c g b}
- Baetis bifurcatus Kapur & Kripalani, 1961^{c g}
- Baetis braaschi Zimmermann, 1980^{c g}
- Baetis brunneicolor McDunnough, 1925^{i c g b}
- Baetis buceratus Eaton, 1870^{c g}
- Baetis bundyae Lehmkuhl, 1973^{i c g}
- Baetis canariensis Müller-Liebenau, 1971^{c g}
- Baetis catharus Thomas, 1986^{c g}
- Baetis celcus Imanishi, 1937^{c g}
- Baetis chandra Kapur & Kripalani, 1961^{c g}
- Baetis chelif Soldán, Godunko & Thomas, 2005^{c g}
- Baetis chinensis Ulmer, 1936^{c g}
- Baetis collinus Müller-Liebenau & Hubbard, 1985^{c g}
- Baetis conservatus Müller-Liebenau & Hubbard, 1985^{c g}
- Baetis consuetus (Hagen, 1858)^{c g}
- Baetis cyrneus Thomas & Gazagnes, 1984^{c g}
- Baetis diablus Day, 1954^{i c g}
- Baetis diversicolor Tshernova, 1952^{c g}
- Baetis elazigi Berker, 1981^{c g}
- Baetis enigmaticus Gattolliat & Sartori, 2008^{c g}
- Baetis estrelensis Müller-Liebenau, 1974^{c g}
- Baetis feles Kluge, 1980^{c g}
- Baetis festivus Kapur & Kripalani, 1961^{c g}
- Baetis flavistriga McDunnough, 1921^{i c g b}
- Baetis fluitans Gillies, 1949^{c g}
- Baetis foemina McDunnough, 1936^{i c g}
- Baetis frequentus Müller-Liebenau & Hubbard, 1985^{c g}
- Baetis fuscatus (Linnaeus, 1761)^{c g}
- Baetis gadeai Thomas, 1999^{c g}
- Baetis gemellus Eaton, 1885^{c g}
- Baetis hainanensis You & Gui, 1995^{c g}
- Baetis harrisoni Barnard, 1932^{c g}
- Baetis heptapotamicus Brodsky, 1930^{c g}
- Baetis himalayanus Kapur & Kripalani, 1961^{c g}
- Baetis hudsonicus Ide, 1937^{i c g}
- Baetis hyugensis Gose, 1980^{c g}
- Baetis idei Müller-Liebenau, 1984^{c g}
- Baetis ilex Jacob & Zimmermann, 1978^{c g}
- Baetis illiesi Müller-Liebenau, 1984^{c g}
- Baetis ingridae Thomas & Soldán, 1987^{c g}
- Baetis intercalaris McDunnough, 1921^{i c g b}
- Baetis irenkae Soldán & Godunko, 2008^{c g}
- Baetis iriomotensis Gose, 1980^{c g}
- Baetis issyksuvensis Brodsky, 1930^{c g}
- Baetis jaervii Savolainen, 2009^{c g}
- Baetis javanicus Ulmer, 1913^{c g}
- Baetis khakassicus Beketov & Godunko, 2005^{c g}
- Baetis kozufensis Ikonomov, 1962^{c g}
- Baetis lahaulensis Kaul & Dubey, 1970^{c g}
- Baetis lawrencei Crass, 1947^{c g}
- Baetis lepidus Müller-Liebenau, 1984^{c g}
- Baetis liebenauae KefferMüller, 1974^{c g}
- Baetis longinervis Navás, 1917^{c g}
- Baetis longistylus Kaul & Dubey, 1970^{c g}
- Baetis lutheri Müller-Liebenau, 1967^{c g}
- Baetis luzonensis Müller-Liebenau, 1982^{c g}
- Baetis macani Kimmins, 1957^{c g}
- Baetis macanis Ali, 1967^{c g}
- Baetis macrospinosus Koch, 1985^{c g}
- Baetis maderensis (Hagen, 1865)^{g}
- Baetis magae (Barnard, 1932)^{c g}
- Baetis magnus McCafferty and Waltz, 1986^{i c g}
- Baetis maurus Kimmins, 1938^{c g}
- Baetis meeheanis Ali, 1967^{c g}
- Baetis melanonyx (Pictet, 1843)^{c g}
- Baetis meridionalis Ikonomov, 1954^{c g}
- Baetis milani Godunko, Prokopov & Soldán, 2004^{c g}
- Baetis mirkae Soldán & Godunko, 2008^{c g}
- Baetis mongolicus Tshernova, 1952^{c g}
- Baetis monikae Kopelke, 1980^{c g}
- Baetis monnerati Gattolliat & Sartori, 2012^{c g}
- Baetis muticus
- Baetis nexus Navás, 1918^{c g}
- Baetis nicolae Thomas & Gazagnes, 1983^{c g}
- Baetis niger
- Baetis nigrescens Navás, 1932^{c g}
- Baetis noshaqensis Uéno, 1966^{c g}
- Baetis notos Allen & Murvosh, 1987^{i c g b}
- Baetis novatus Müller-Liebenau, 1981^{c g}
- Baetis nubecularis Eaton, 1898^{c g}
- Baetis numidicus Soldán & Thomas, 1983^{c g}
- Baetis obscuriventris Tshernova, 1952^{c g}
- Baetis obtusiceps Tshernova, 1952^{c g}
- Baetis olivascens Ulmer, 1939^{c g}
- Baetis oreophilus Kluge, 1982^{c g}
- Baetis palisadi Mayo, 1952^{i c g}
- Baetis pasquetorum Righetti & Thomas, 2002^{c g}
- Baetis pavidus Grandi, 1951^{c g}
- Baetis pentaphlebodes Ujhelyi, 1966^{c g}
- Baetis permultus Kopelke, 1980^{c g}
- Baetis persecutor McDunnough, 1939^{i g}
- Baetis persecutus McDunnough, 1939^{c g}
- Baetis petrovi Tshernova, 1938^{c g}
- Baetis phoebus McDunnough, 1923^{c g}
- Baetis piscatoris Traver, 1935^{i c g}
- Baetis pluto McDunnough, 1925^{i c g b}
- Baetis posticatus (Say, 1823)^{i c g}
- Baetis praemontanus Braasch, 1980^{c g}
- Baetis pseudogemellus Soldán, 1977^{c g}
- Baetis pseudorhodani Müller-Liebenau, 1971^{c g}
- Baetis punicus Thomas, Boumaiza & Soldán, 1983^{c g}
- Baetis punjabensis Kapur & Kripalani, 1961^{c g}
- Baetis realonae Müller-Liebenau, 1982^{c g}
- Baetis rhodani (Pictet, 1843)^{c g}
- Baetis rusticans McDunnough, 1925^{i c g}
- Baetis rutilocylindratus Wang, Qin, Chen & Zhou, 2011^{c g}
- Baetis sabahensis Müller-Liebenau, 1984^{c g}
- Baetis sahoensis Gose, 1980^{c g}
- Baetis samochai Koch, 1981^{c g}
- Baetis scambus Eaton, 1870^{c g}
- Baetis septemmenes Dubey, 1971^{c g}
- Baetis seragrius Dubey, 1970^{c g}
- Baetis shinanonis Uéno, 1931^{c g}
- Baetis silvaticus Kluge, 1983^{c g}
- Baetis simplex Kapur & Kripalani, 1961^{c g}
- Baetis sinespinosus Soldán & Thomas, 1983^{c g}
- Baetis sogeriensis Harker, 1954^{c g}
- Baetis solangensis Dubey, 1970^{c g}
- Baetis solidus (Hagen, 1858)^{c g}
- Baetis solitarius Gillies, 1949^{c g}
- Baetis spatulatus Gillies, 1994^{c g}
- Baetis spei Thomas & Dia, 1985^{c g}
- Baetis strugensis (Ikonomov, 1962)^{g}
- Baetis subalpinus Bengtsson, 1917^{c g}
- Baetis sumatranus Ulmer, 1939^{c g}
- Baetis takamiensis Gose, 1980^{c g}
- Baetis taldybulaki Sroka, Godunko, Novikova & Kluge, 2012^{c g}
- Baetis thermicus Uéno, 1931^{c g}
- Baetis thurbonis Gillies, 1949^{c g}
- Baetis tigroides Gillies, 1949^{c g}
- Baetis totsukawensis Gose, 1980^{c g}
- Baetis tracheatus KefferMüller & Machel, 1967^{c g}
- Baetis transiliensis Brodsky, 1930^{c g}
- Baetis tricaudatus Dodds, 1923^{i c g b}
- Baetis tripunctatus Gillies, 1994^{c g}
- Baetis tsushimensis Gose, 1980^{c g}
- Baetis uenoi Gose, 1980^{c g}
- Baetis ursinus Kazlauskas, 1963^{c g}
- Baetis ussuricus Kluge, 1983^{c g}
- Baetis vadimi ^{g}
- Baetis vaillanti Navás, 1931^{c g}
- Baetis vardarensis Ikonomov, 1962^{c g}
- Baetis venustulus — Eaton, 1885
- Baetis vernus Curtis, 1834^{c g}
- Baetis yamatoensis Gose, 1965^{c g}
- Baetis yixiani Gui & Lu, 1999^{c g}
- Baetis zdenkae Soldán & Godunko, 2009^{c g}

Data sources: i = ITIS, c = Catalogue of Life, g = GBIF, b = Bugguide.net
