= Palmer Museum of Art =

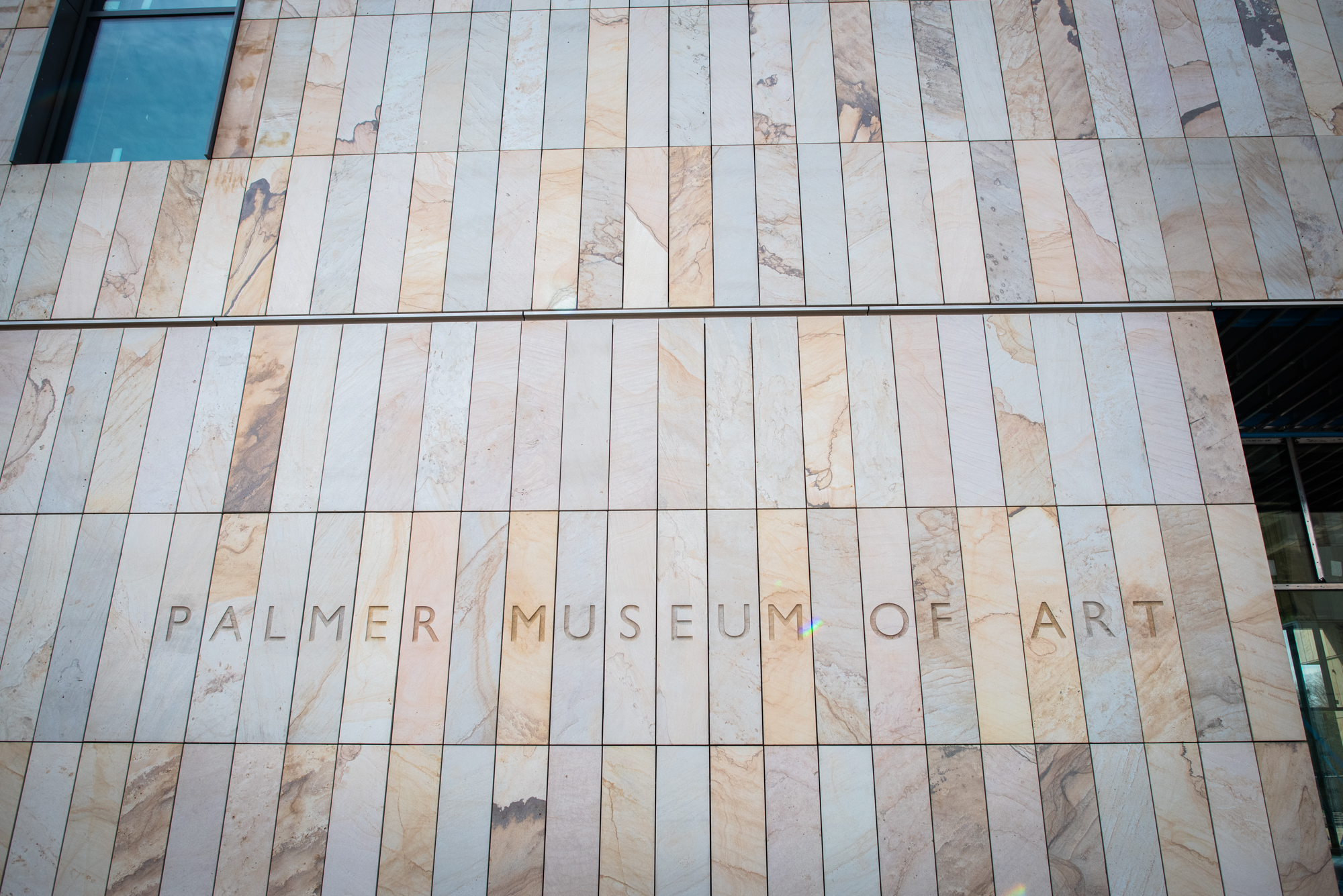
- Sandstone facade of the new Palmer Museum of Art in 2023.
- Established: October 10, 1972
- Location: 650 Bigler Road, University Park, Pennsylvania 16802-2507
- Coordinates: 40.806823611338984°N 77.86795451408734°W
- Type: Art museum
- Collection size: Nearly 11,000 works
- Director: Amanda H. Hellman
- Architect: Allied Works
- Owner: Pennsylvania State University
- Parking: Parking adjacent
- Website: palmermuseum.psu.edu

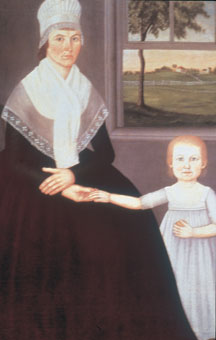
Mother and Son (1799) by John Brewster, Jr.

The Palmer Museum of Art is the art museum of The Pennsylvania State University, located on the University Park campus in State College, Pennsylvania.

== Collections ==
The museum has an increasing permanent collection of nearly 11,000 works. The collection includes American and European paintings, drawings, photographs, prints, and sculpture; contemporary European, American, and Japanese studio ceramics; Asian ceramics, paintings, jades and prints; and objects from ancient African, European, Near Eastern, and American cultures.

The American collection features early portraits by John Brewster, Jr., Jacob Eichholtz, Rembrandt Peale, Gilbert Stuart, and Benjamin West; 19th-century landscape paintings by Sanford Robinson Gifford, George Inness, John F. Kensett, and William Trost Richards; Ashcan School works by William Glackens, Robert Henri, Maurice Prendergast, Everett Shinn, and John Sloan; There are Modernist and Postmodernist works by Alexander Calder, Jerome Witkin, Arthur Dove, Marsden Hartley, Joseph Stella, Marguerite Zorach, Nathan Oliveira, and Jules Olitski, as well as a major collection of works by Seymour Lipton. There are sculptures by Dale Chihuly, Willie Cole, and Alex Katz, and a number of Andy Warhol’s photographs.

The print collection has significant holdings of American prints, Japanese woodblock prints, photographs, contemporary art, and a series of feminist art portfolios including Femfolio, and 10x10: Ten Women, Ten Prints. Notable artists include Kara Walker, Carrie Mae Weems, Faith Ringgold, Miriam Schapiro, Emma Amos, Eleanor Antin, Nancy Azara, Betsy Damon, Mary Beth Edelson, Lauren Ewing, Harmony Hammond, Joyce Kozloff, Diane Neumaier, Faith Ringgold, Carolee Schneemann, Joan Semmel, Sylvia Sleigh, Joan Snyder, Nancy Spero, May Stevens, Athena Tacha, June Wayne, and Martha Wilson. Other prints in the collection include works by Edward Hopper, Thomas Hart Benton and Grant Wood.

The European collection features Old Master paintings, 19th-century paintings, prints and drawings, and 20th-century photographs and ceramics. Its non-Western holdings include works by Fernando Botero and Yinka Shonibare, collections of Japanese woodcuts, Asian sculpture and ceramics, African sculpture, and Peruvian ceramics. There is also an adjoining sculpture garden with works by Lipton and Bonnie Collura.

At the previous Curtin Road location is a massive pair of bronze lion's paws that flank the building's front steps. Modeled by sculptor Paul Bowden in 1993, they playfully evoke the traditional lion statues that flank Beaux-arts buildings, such as the New York Public Library, and also pay tribute to Penn State's mascot, the Nittany Lion.

The museum's permanent photographic collection includes an array of hidden mother photographs, which became popular in the early 2010s as interest in such photographs spread on the internet.

== History ==
The University Art Museum's original building was a Brutalist "box," containing three galleries, that opened in 1972. Post-modernist architect Charles Willard Moore greatly expanded the building in 1993, converting the "box" into a 150-seat auditorium, and wrapping eleven new galleries around it. He created a lively entrance plaza, reminiscent of his Piazza d'Italia (1978) in New Orleans, Louisiana, adding multiple levels and a graduated arcade of brick arches resting on cartoon Tuscan columns. The museum was renamed to honor James and Barbara Palmer, who initiated the campaign to expand the building in 1986 with a $2 million gift.

The museum's founding director was William Hull, for whom one of the galleries is named. The current director is Amanda H. Hellman.

The Friends of the Palmer Museum of Art was founded in 1974 to aid in fund-raising and public outreach. The museum has a Friends Leadership Council as well as a National Advisory Council.

In summer and fall 2023, the museum moved to a new, 73,000-square-foot facility at the Arboretum at Penn State which has new educational spaces and nearly twice the amount of current exhibition space.

The new Palmer Museum of Art is located at 650 Bigler Road in The Arboretum at Penn State.
