= Fourmile Creek (Pennsylvania) =

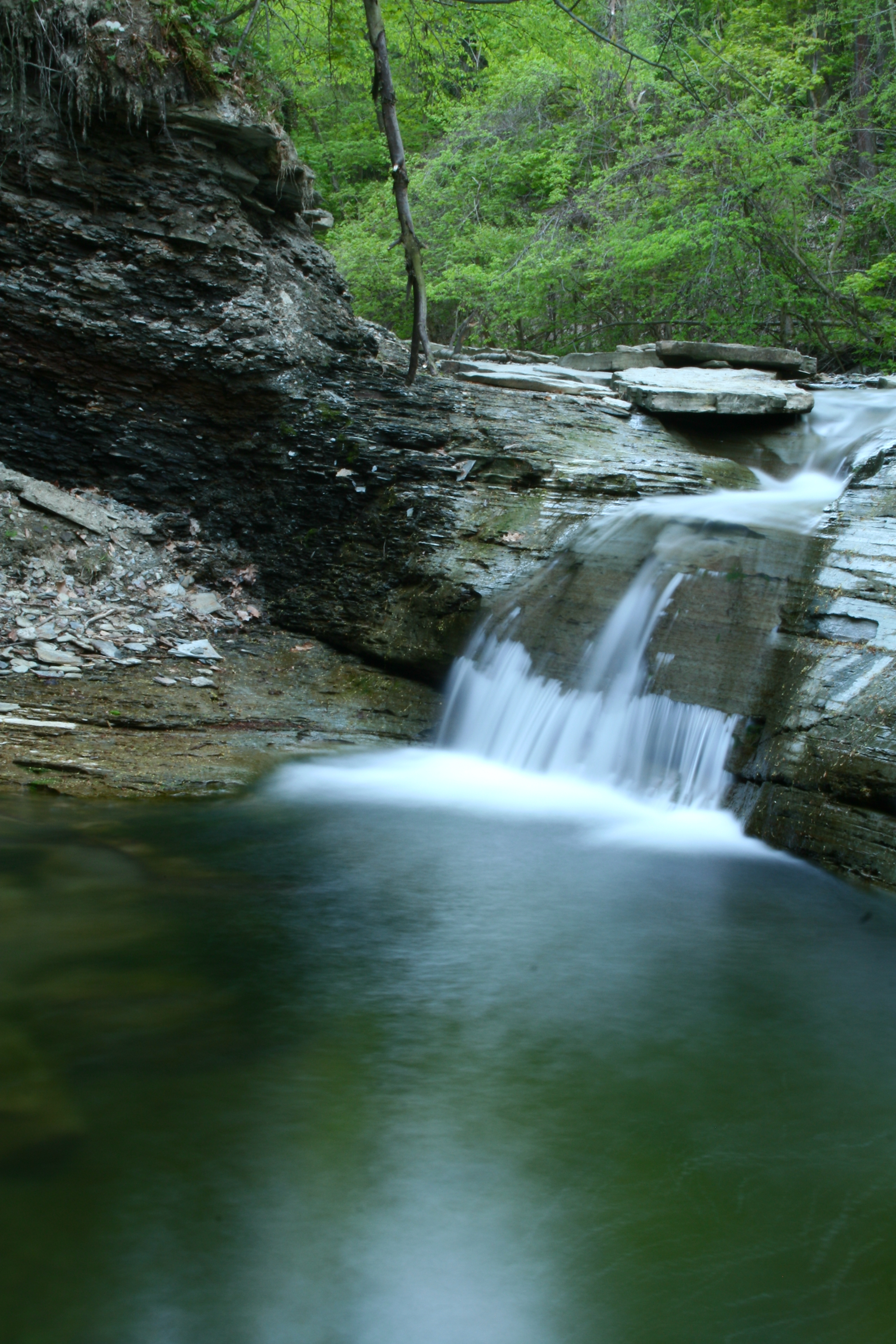
- A waterfall on Fourmile Creek in Wintergreen Gorge

- Location of the mouth of Fourmile Creek in Pennsylvania
- Etymology: the creek's distance from Erie, Pennsylvania

Location
- Country: United States
- State: Pennsylvania
- County: Erie

Physical characteristics
- Source
  - location: Greene Township, Erie County, Pennsylvania
  - coordinates: 42°3′55″N 79°56′37″W
- Mouth: Lake Erie
  - location: Lawrence Park, Erie County, Pennsylvania
  - coordinates: 42°9′36″N 80°1′47″W
- Length: 8.0 mi (12.9 km)
- Basin size: 11.93 sq mi (30.9 km^{2})

Fourmile Creek is a tributary of Lake Erie in Erie County, Pennsylvania, United States. It is approximately 8 miles (13 km) in length. It has a drainage basin of 11.93 square miles (30.9 km^{2}) and is a part of the Lake Erie Watershed. It has carved Wintergreen Gorge into the local bedrock.

== Course ==
Fourmile Creek starts in Greene Township, immediately north of Pennsylvania Route 8. It flows northwest, with its valley getting deeper as it flows onwards. After several miles, it crosses under Interstate 90 and exits Greene Township, entering Harborcreek Township. At this point, the creek turns northwards and its valley continues to get deeper. After some distance, the valley gets shallower and the creek flows under Pennsylvania Route 290. It turns northwest and heads along the border between Harborcreek Township and Erie, eventually entering Erie. Upon entering Erie, it continues northwest, passing through the Lawrence Park Golf Club and entering Lake Erie.

== Hydrology ==
The pH of Fourmile Creek ranges between 6 and 9. The salinity ranges from 0.1 parts per trillion to 0.3 parts per trillion. The total concentration of dissolved solids ranges from 180 to 500 parts per million. In 1982, the concentration of sodium in the creek ranged from 2.91 to 40.8 milligrams per liter at two sites. In the same year, the concentration of magnesium ranged from 2.9 to 14.2 milligrams per liter at two sites. The calcium concentration ranged from 29.3 to 134.5 milligrams per liter at two sites. The concentration of phosphates ranged from 0 to 0.55 milligrams per liter at two sites.

During times of flooding, the velocity of the waters of Fourmile Creek is 1.25 metres (4.1 ft) per second. During droughts, the velocity is 0.051 metres (0.17 ft) per second. The discharge ranges from 1400 cubic centimeters per second in times of drought to 91,000 cubic centimeters per second during floods. The conductivity of the creek ranges from 274 micro-siemens to 747 micro-siemens. Between late summer and spring, the water temperature ranges from 9.9 °C (49.8 °F) to 24.5 °C (76.1 °F).

In a list of 22 tributaries of Lake Erie compiled in a Strategic Action Plan, Fourmile Creek was ranked as the fourth-lowest in water quality. There are few cases of nonpoint source pollution in the upper reaches of the creek.

There are two dams on Fourmile Creek. One is located in the Lawrence Park Golf Course and the other is located south of Station Road. There is also a block of concrete in the stream that functions as a third dam.

A stream in the watershed of Fourmile Creek received sewage discharges for at least 20 years in the 1900s.

== Geology and Geography ==
There is one waterfall on Fourmile Creek. It is 5 feet (1.5 m) high and located between Cooper Road and Interstate 90.

Fourmile Creek has eroded through glacial and lake sediments and into the underlying bedrock, which consists mainly of shale from the Devonian period interbedded with sandstone and siltstone.

In its upper reaches, Fourmile Creek flows through a relatively narrow valley that is 30 feet (9.1 m) deep. There is slide rock in the valley.

Fourmile Creek has an elevation of 574 feet (175 m) above sea level.

== History ==
Since 2007, improvements have been undertaken to improve steelhead spawning in Fourmile Creek and provide better fishing access. As of 2011, two aluminum fishways have been added to allow steelhead trout to bypass river obstacles and improve access to their spawning grounds. In 2012, a golf course adjacent to these improvements finalized legal easements granting public access to the fishways via their private property.

== Biology ==
The pathogenic Aeromonas veronii bacteria has been observed in Fourmile Creek. Benthic macroinvertebrates live in the upper reaches of the creek. Six species of mayflies were observed on the creek in the late 1970s and early 1980s. They are Paraleptophlebia strigula, Paraleptophlebia debilis, Habrophlebiodes americana, Baetis tricaudatus, Baetus flavistriga, and Ameletus ludens.

Pine trees grow densely in the valley in the upper reaches of Fourmile Creek.

== See also ==
- List of rivers of Pennsylvania
- Twelvemile Creek
- Twentymile Creek
