= Wintergreen Gorge Bridge =

- Coordinates: 42°7′24.5″N 79°59′47″W
- Carries: PA 290 (Bayfront Connector)
- Crosses: Fourmile Creek
- Locale: Erie, Pennsylvania, United States
- Other name(s): Sergeant Donald S. Oaks Memorial Bridge
- Maintained by: PennDOT
- NBI Number: 250290008000920

Characteristics
- Total length: 1,114 ft (340 m)
- Width: 67 ft (20 m)
- Load limit: 60 metric tons (66 short tons)

History
- Construction end: November 1, 2003

Statistics
- Daily traffic: 10,694

The Wintergreen Gorge Bridge is a 1,114-foot (340 m), steel, plate girder bridge that carries Pennsylvania Route 290 and the Bayfront Connector over Fourmile Creek and the Wintergreen Gorge in Harborcreek Township, Erie County in the U.S. state of Pennsylvania. It is both the second-longest and the second-highest bridge in Erie County, with the Interstate 79 bridge in the city of Erie and the Interstate 90 bridge over Sixmile Creek being the longest and the highest, respectively.

== History ==
The Wintergreen Gorge Bridge was completed on November 1, 2003 and was opened to traffic on November 21, 2003. It cost $32 million to build. The bridge was designated the Sergeant Donald S. Oaks Memorial Bridge on June 29, 2006 by the Pennsylvania General Assembly.

== Recognition ==
The Wintergreen Gorge Bridge won the "Outstanding Major Bridge of 2003" award from the Association for Bridge Construction and Design. The bridge also won the "Globe Award" from the American Road and Transportation Builders Association and the American Association of State Highway and Transportation Officials' "Trailblazer Award".
