= Ameletus vernalis =

Scientific classification
- Domain: Eukaryota
- Kingdom: Animalia
- Phylum: Arthropoda
- Class: Insecta
- Order: Ephemeroptera
- Family: Ameletidae
- Genus: Ameletus
- Species: A. vernalis

Binomial name
- Ameletus vernalis McDunnough, 1924

Species of mayfly

Ameletus vernalis is a species of combmouthed minnow mayfly in the family Ameletidae. It is found in southwestern Canada and the western United States.
