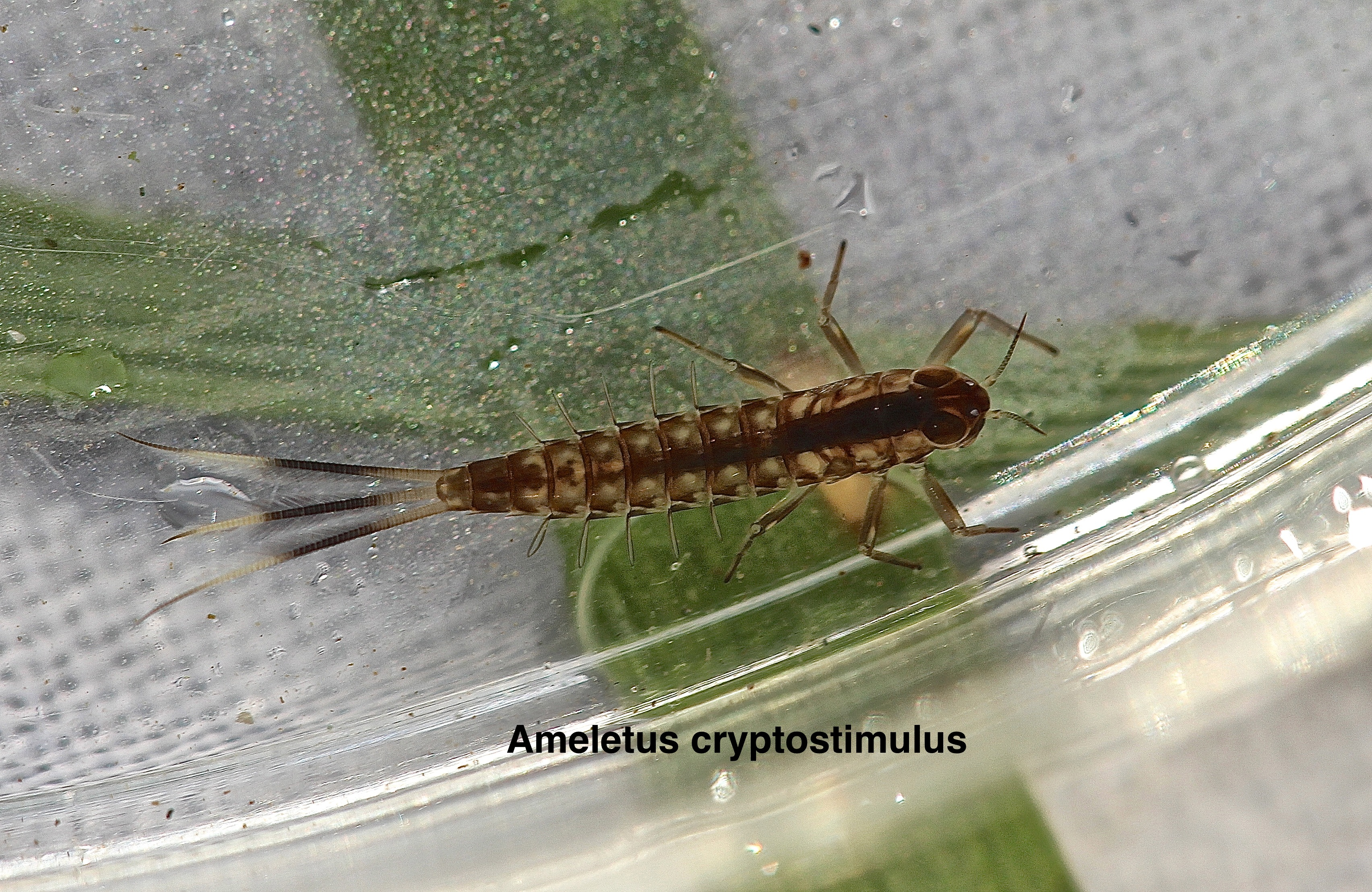

Scientific classification
- Domain: Eukaryota
- Kingdom: Animalia
- Phylum: Arthropoda
- Class: Insecta
- Order: Ephemeroptera
- Family: Ameletidae
- Genus: Ameletus
- Species: A. cryptostimulus

Binomial name
- Ameletus cryptostimulus Carle, 1978

= Ameletus cryptostimulus =

Species of mayfly

Ameletus cryptostimulus is a species of combmouthed minnow mayfly in the family Ameletidae. It is found in southeastern Canada and the eastern United States.
