= Ameletus tertius =

Scientific classification
- Domain: Eukaryota
- Kingdom: Animalia
- Phylum: Arthropoda
- Class: Insecta
- Order: Ephemeroptera
- Family: Ameletidae
- Genus: Ameletus
- Species: A. tertius

Binomial name
- Ameletus tertius McDunnough, 1938

Species of mayfly

Ameletus tertius is a species of combmouthed minnow mayfly in the family Ameletidae. It is found in North America.
