= Ameletus validus =

Scientific classification
- Domain: Eukaryota
- Kingdom: Animalia
- Phylum: Arthropoda
- Class: Insecta
- Order: Ephemeroptera
- Family: Ameletidae
- Genus: Ameletus
- Species: A. validus

Binomial name
- Ameletus validus McDunnough, 1923

Species of mayfly

Ameletus validus is a species of combmouthed minnow mayfly in the family Ameletidae. It is found in southwestern Canada, the western United States, and Alaska.
