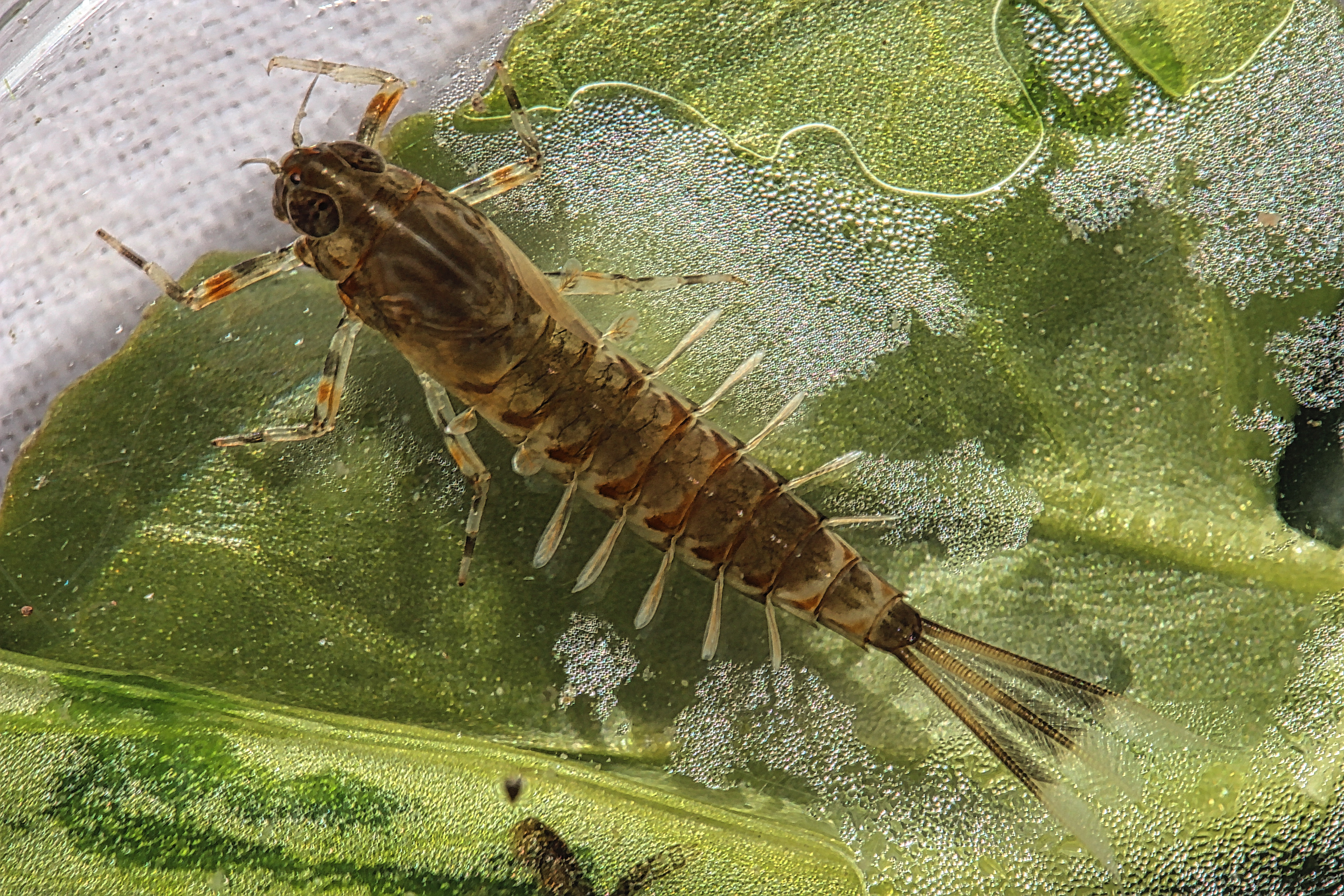

Scientific classification
- Domain: Eukaryota
- Kingdom: Animalia
- Phylum: Arthropoda
- Class: Insecta
- Order: Ephemeroptera
- Family: Ameletidae
- Genus: Ameletus
- Species: A. subnotatus

Binomial name
- Ameletus subnotatus Eaton, 1885

= Ameletus subnotatus =

Species of mayfly

Ameletus subnotatus is a species of combmouthed minnow mayfly in the family Ameletidae. It is found in all of Canada, the northern, and southwestern United States.
