= Ameletus browni =

Scientific classification
- Domain: Eukaryota
- Kingdom: Animalia
- Phylum: Arthropoda
- Class: Insecta
- Order: Ephemeroptera
- Family: Ameletidae
- Genus: Ameletus
- Species: A. browni

Binomial name
- Ameletus browni McDunnough, 1933

Species of mayfly

Ameletus browni is a mayfly in the family Ameletidae ("combmouthed minnow mayflies"), in the order Ephemeroptera ("mayflies"). A common name for Ameletus browni is "purple marram". Ameletus browni is found in North America. It is native to Canada and the Continental US.

== Notes ==
- Mayfly Central: The Mayflies of North America (2009) Distribution values: [CAN:NE;USA:NE]
