= Wintergreen Gorge =

Coordinates: 42.1095°N 79.9876°W

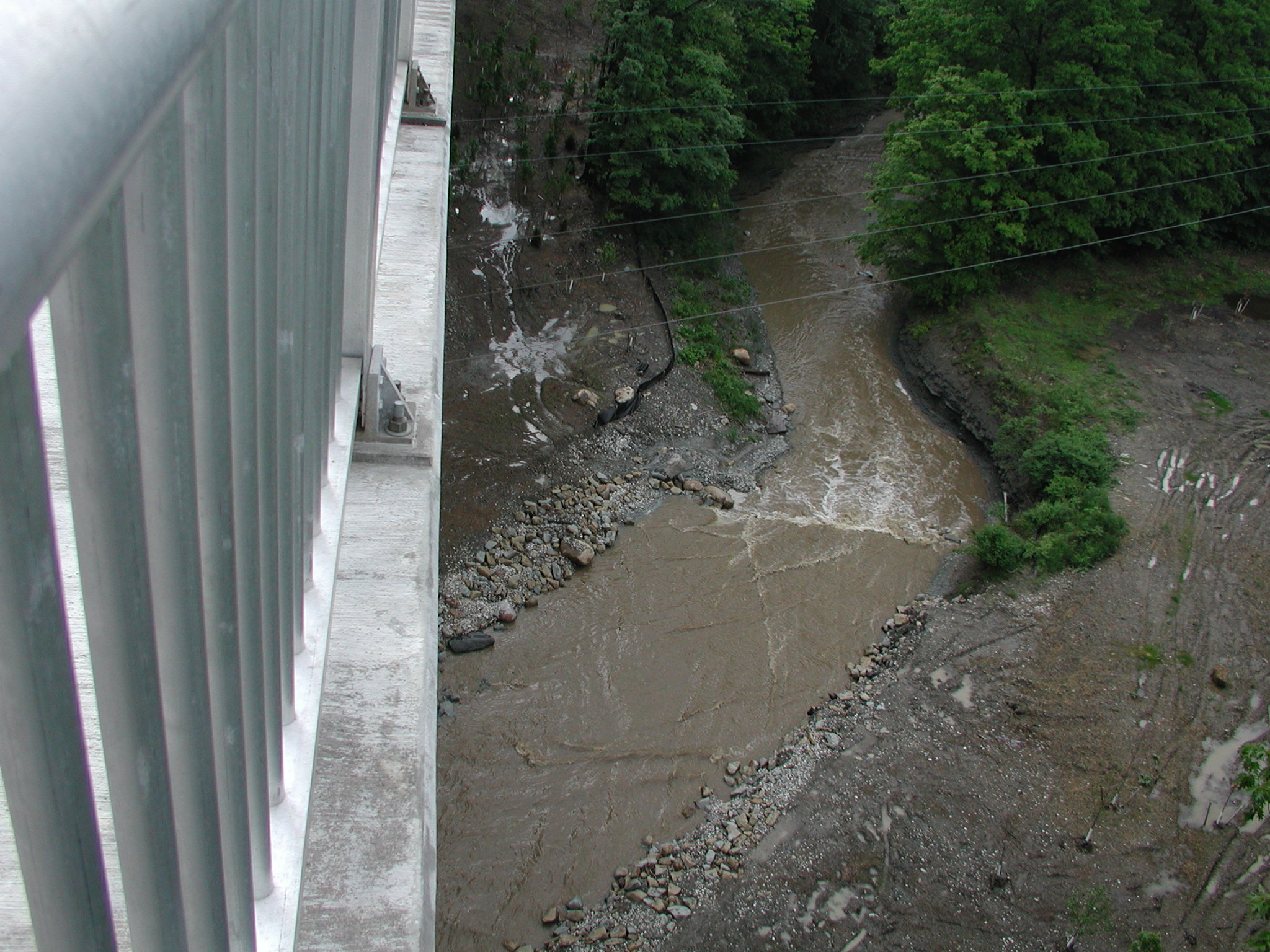
View from the Wintergreen Gorge Bridge into Wintergreen Gorge

Wintergreen Gorge is a six-mile-long canyon located in Harborcreek Township, Erie County in the U.S. state of Pennsylvania. The canyon reaches 250 feet (76 m) deep at its highest point, gradually becoming shallower as it proceeds north. It is situated along Fourmile Creek and is partially on the campus of Penn State Behrend. The Bayfront Connector spans the gorge over the Wintergreen Gorge Bridge.

Wintergreen Gorge was named for the wintergreen plant that was commonly found in the canyon. The gorge is also home to wide swaths of forest, as well as a variety of plant and animal life.

A series of trails have been created to allow access to the canyon while promoting sustainable trail practices.

== Formation ==
Wintergreen Gorge was formed 11,000 years ago by Fourmile Creek eroding the glacial debris left behind from the last ice age when the glaciers retreated 20,000 years ago and eroding further into shale from the late Devonian period.
