= The Arboretum at Penn State =

Arboretum in Pennsylvania, U.S.

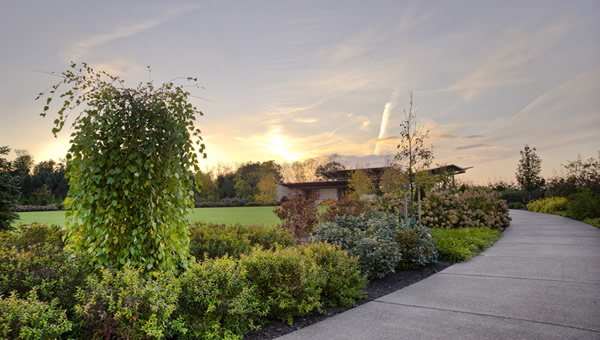
- The H.O. Smith Botanical Gardens in the Arboretum at Penn State

- Location within Pennsylvania
- Location: University Park, Pennsylvania, U.S.
- Coordinates: 40.805051°N 77.864088°W
- Area: 370 acres (1.5 km^{2})
- Designer: Sasaki Associates (Master Plan); MTR Landscape Architects LLC
- Owner: Pennsylvania State University
- Director: Casey Sclar
- Website: arboretum.psu.edu

The Arboretum at Penn State (370 acres), which contains the H.O. Smith Botanic Gardens, is a new arboretum at Pennsylvania State University adjacent to its University Park campus in State College, Pennsylvania. It is Penn State's second arboretum, joining the Arboretum at Penn State Behrend, which was created in 2003.

The arboretum's master plan was developed from 1996 to 1999 by Sasaki. Specific plans for landscape and botanic gardens and their associated facilities were completed in 2002 by MTR Landscape Architects LLC, and the first tree, a white oak (Quercus alba) was dedicated in 2005. A donation of $10 million was needed to begin the construction of the Arboretum and on May 18, 2007, this donation was received from Charles H. "Skip" Smith. The construction of Phase I of the H.O. Smith Botanic Gardens, named in honor of Mr. Smith's father, was completed in fall 2009 and the gardens were officially dedicated on April 25, 2010.

The new Palmer Museum of Art, which opened in June 2024, is located adjacent to the Arboretum.

== Gardens and Garden Features ==
Strolling Garden The Strolling Garden surrounds the oval Event Lawn, a space often used for festivals and concerts. The Arboretum's witness tree, the Hosler Oak, which was the first tree planted in the botanic gardens, can be found in the Strolling Garden.

Childhood's Gate Children's Garden In July 2014, the Arboretum finished construction of and opened the Childhood Gate's Children's Garden, designed by Didier Design Studio. It includes a limestone cave, stone amphitheater for events, a Glass House, and other attractions for children. The Children's Garden has many native Pennsylvania plants and is a microcosm of the regional landscape. Sculptures representing Pennsylvania animals can be found throughout the garden.

Pollinator and Bird Garden In 2021, the Arboretum opened the Pollinator and Bird Garden, a space designed with the ambitious goal of attracting every species of pollinating insect and every resident and migratory bird found in Pennsylvania. It provides a mix of habitats, including open meadows, shady woodlands, wetlands, and a large pond. The garden also contains orchards and agricultural beds situated near honeybee hives and native bee "hotels."

The Rose and Fragrance Garden The walled Rose and Fragrance Garden contains plants selected for their beauty and scent, including numerous roses and tree peonies.

The Oasis Garden A circular pool lies in the center of the Oasis Garden. During the summer months, the pool holds displays of aquatic plants. A path lined with bamboo leads to the nearby Soaring Waters fountain.

The North Terrace and Poplar Court A square of tall poplar trees marks the site of a future planned glass house conservatory. The adjacent terrace garden holds seasonal displays of tropical plants.

The Ramage Marsh Meadow A marshy field of switchgrass lies at the eastern edge of the Arboretum. The Marsh Meadow preserves a sensitive groundwater recharge area. Visitors coming from campus can cross the Marsh Meadow via a boardwalk.

Natural land areas: the Hartley Wood and Gerhold Wildflower Trail, Prairie Restoration Site, Big Hollow and the Bellefonte Rail Trail Extensive natural areas lie beyond the botanic gardens. They include a remnant of old-growth forest, the Hartley Wood, a rare native prairie, and Big Hollow. Both the Hartley Wood and the prairie are being managed to reduce the presence of invasive plant species and foster the growth of native ones, including ephemeral native wildflowers planted along the Gerhold Wildflower Trail in the Hartley Wood.

An under drained valley called Big Hollow lies at the western edge of the Hartley Wood and the prairie. The Bellefonte Rail Trail, which converted an old stretch of railroad into a walking and biking path, runs through Big Hollow. Until automobile use escalated post-World War II, the railroad was the primary way that Penn State students traveled to the University Park campus.

== Gallery ==
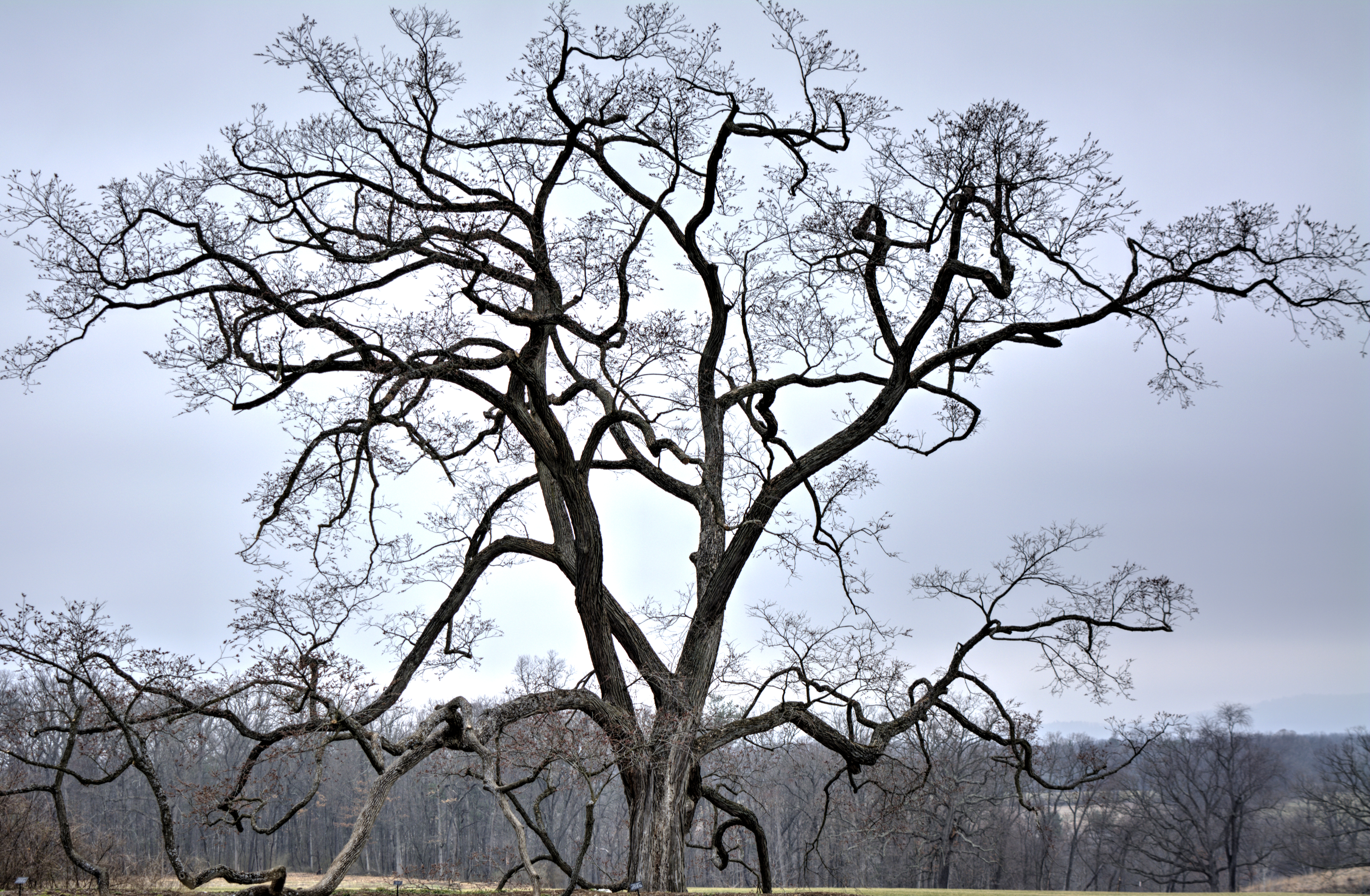
A red elm (Ulmus rubra) at The Arboretum at Penn State

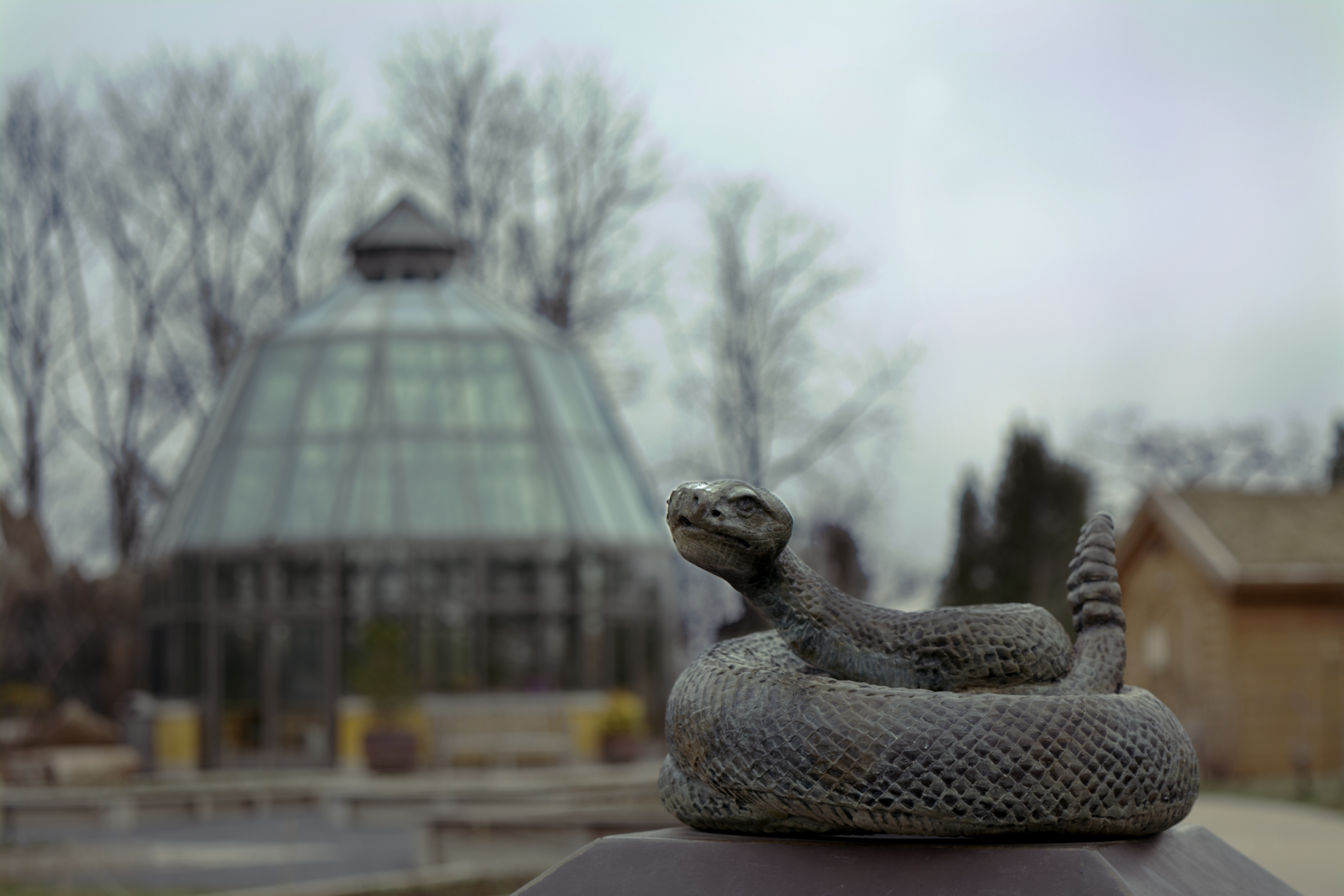
The Glass House in Childhood's Gate Children's Garden

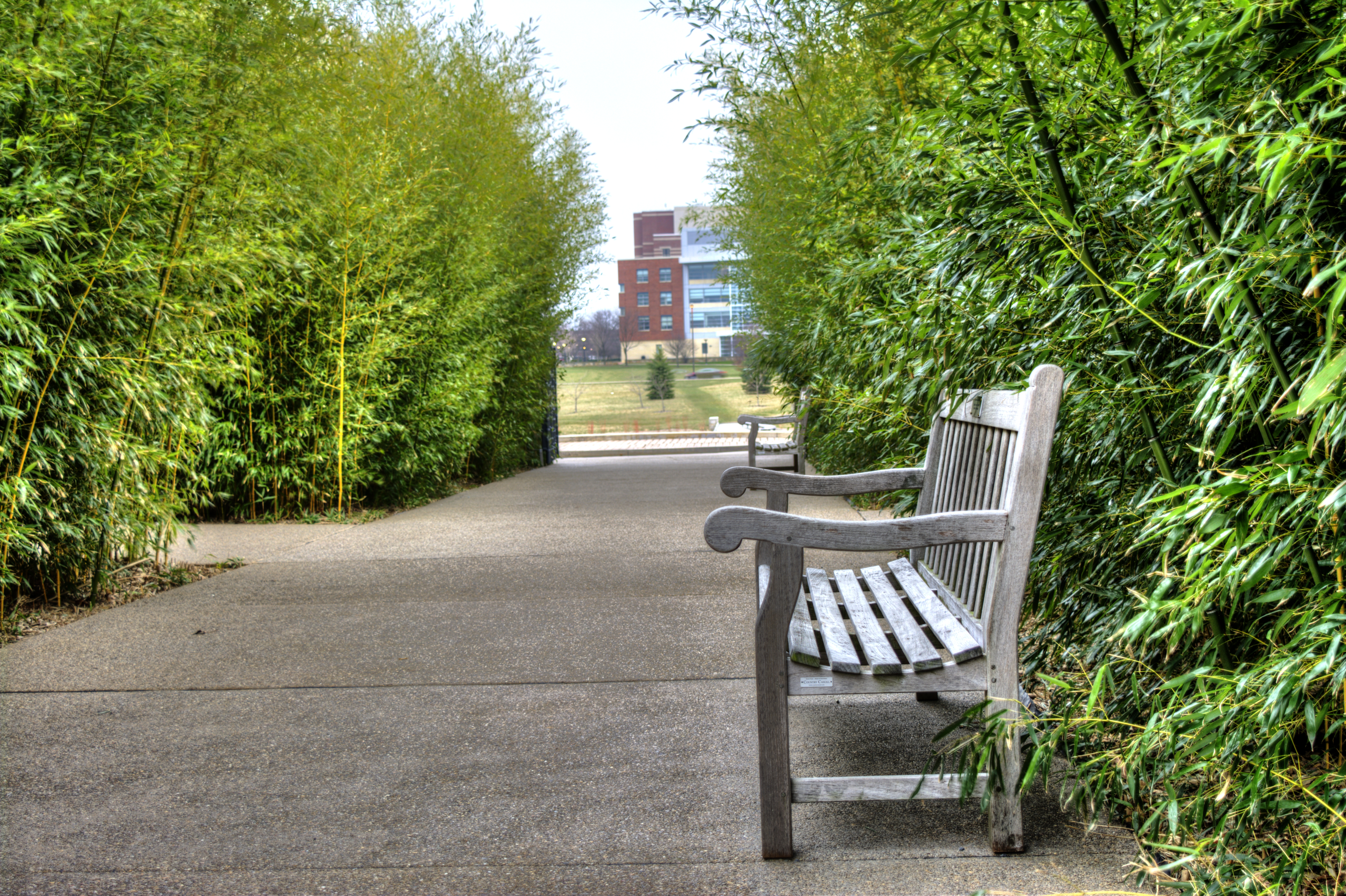
The Bamboo Allée leads to the fountain area. Penn State's Smeal College of Business can be seen in the center of the picture

== See also ==
- List of botanical gardens in the United States
