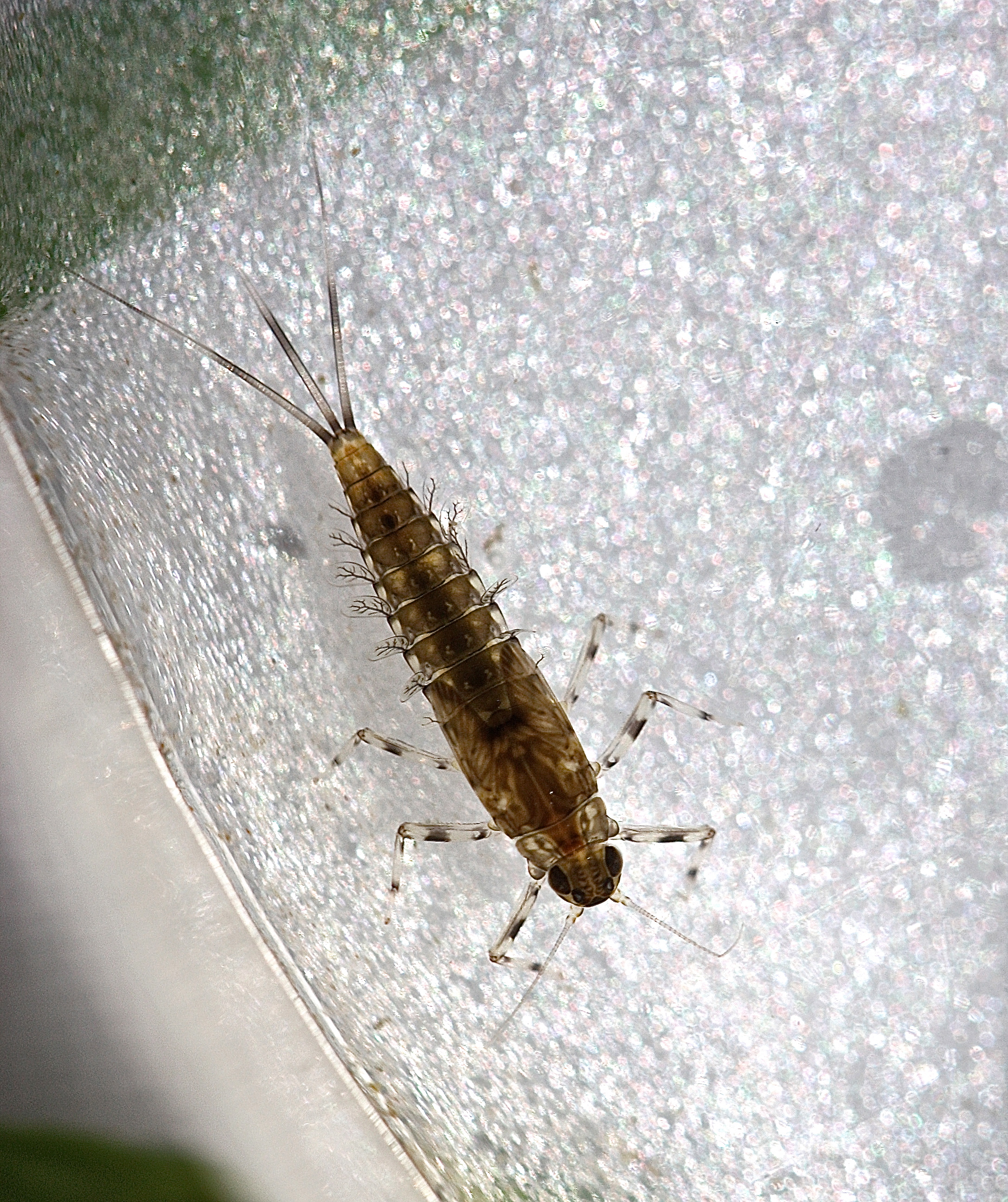
- Baetis intercalaris, immature

Scientific classification
- Domain: Eukaryota
- Kingdom: Animalia
- Phylum: Arthropoda
- Class: Insecta
- Order: Ephemeroptera
- Family: Baetidae
- Genus: Baetis
- Species: B. intercalaris

Binomial name
- Baetis intercalaris McDunnough, 1921

Synonyms
- Baetis lasallei Banks, 1924

= Baetis intercalaris =

Species of mayfly

Baetis intercalaris is a species of small minnow mayfly in the family Baetidae. It is found in the south half of Canada and the continental United States.
