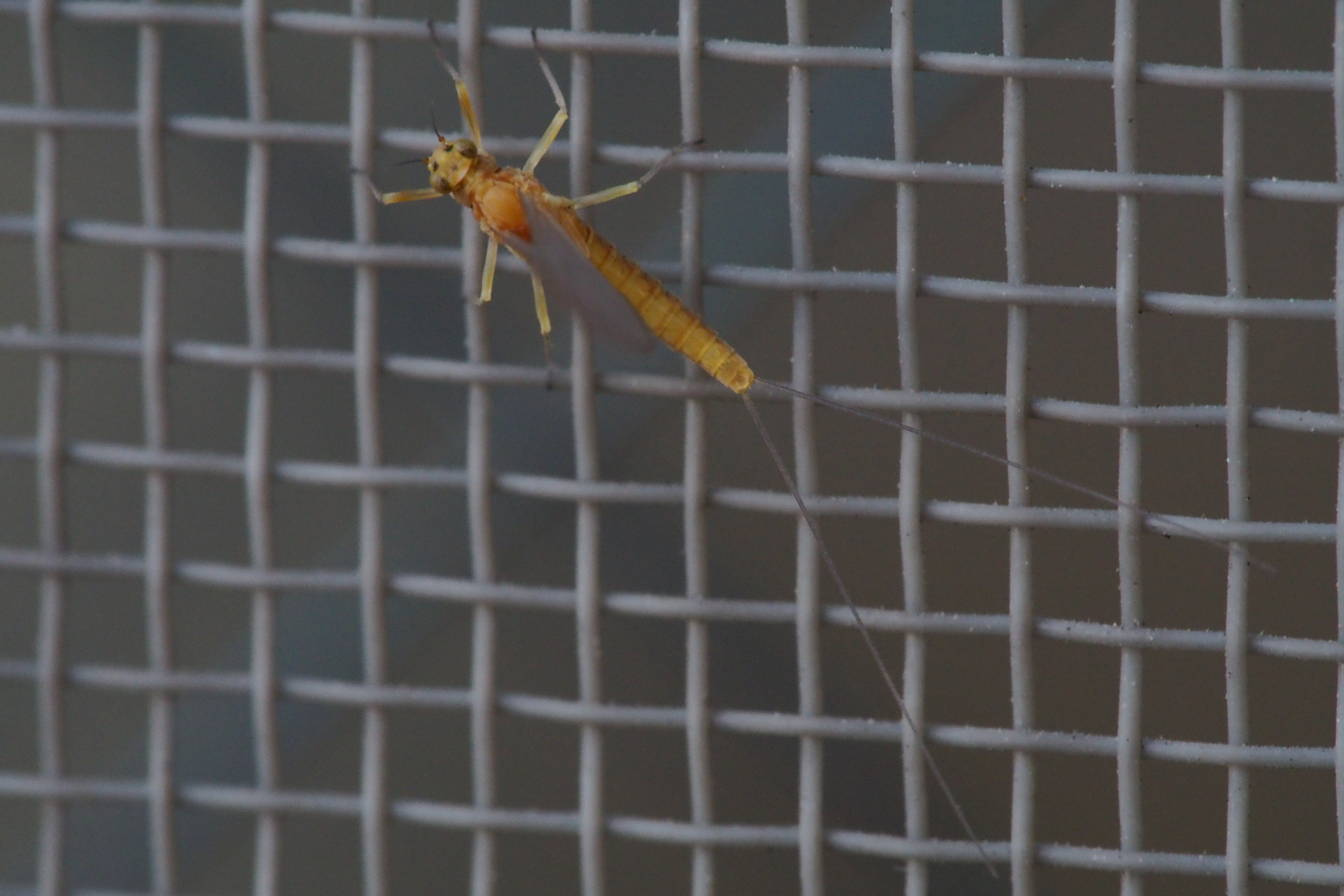
- Baetis sahoensis
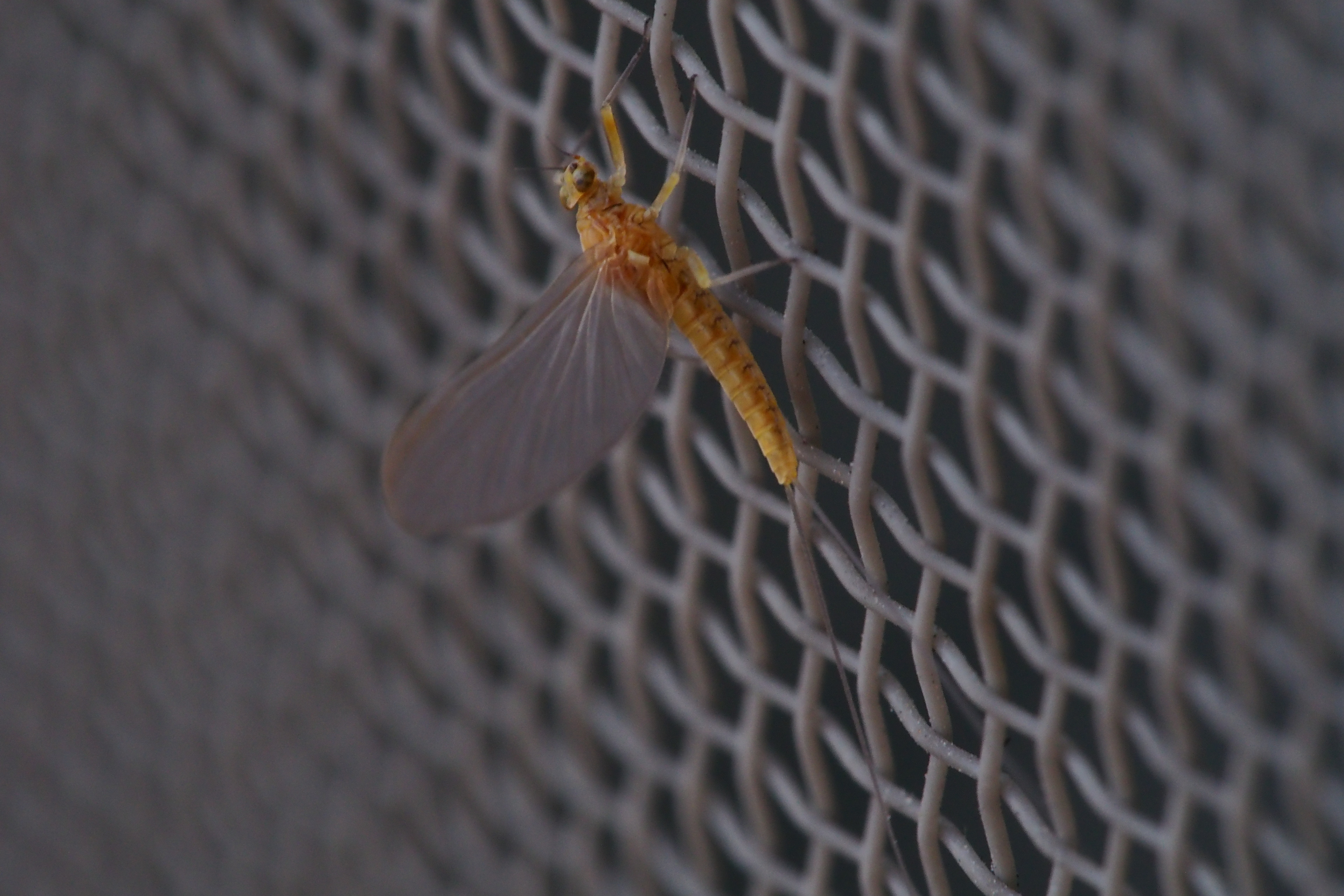
- A similar picture but clearly showing the wings of the species.

Scientific classification
- Domain: Eukaryota
- Kingdom: Animalia
- Phylum: Arthropoda
- Class: Insecta
- Order: Ephemeroptera
- Family: Baetidae
- Genus: Baetis
- Species: B. sahoensis

Binomial name
- Baetis sahoensis Gose, 1980

= Baetis sahoensis =

Species of mayfly

Baetis sahoensis is a species of mayflies in the genus Baetis. It lives exclusively in Japan, with reported sightings near the cities of Osaka and Sapporo.
