= Pennsylvania Route 290 =

State highway in Erie County, Pennsylvania, US

Pennsylvania Route 290
- PA 290 highlighted in red

Route information
- Maintained by PennDOT
- Length: 9.173 mi (14.763 km)
- Existed: 2006–present

Major junctions
- West end: I-79 / PA 5 in Erie
- US 20 in Erie
- East end: I-90 / PA 430 in Harborcreek Township

Location
- Country: United States
- State: Pennsylvania
- Counties: Erie

Highway system
- Pennsylvania State Route System; Interstate; US; State; Scenic; Legislative
← PA 288	→ PA 291

Pennsylvania Route 290 (PA 290, designated by the Pennsylvania Department of Transportation as SR 290) is a 9.17-mile-long (14.76 km) state highway located in the environs of Erie, Pennsylvania. The western terminus of the route is at Interstate 79 and Pennsylvania Route 5 in the neighborhood of Dock Junction. The eastern terminus is at Interstate 90 and Pennsylvania Route 430 southeast of downtown in Harborcreek Township.

== Route description ==
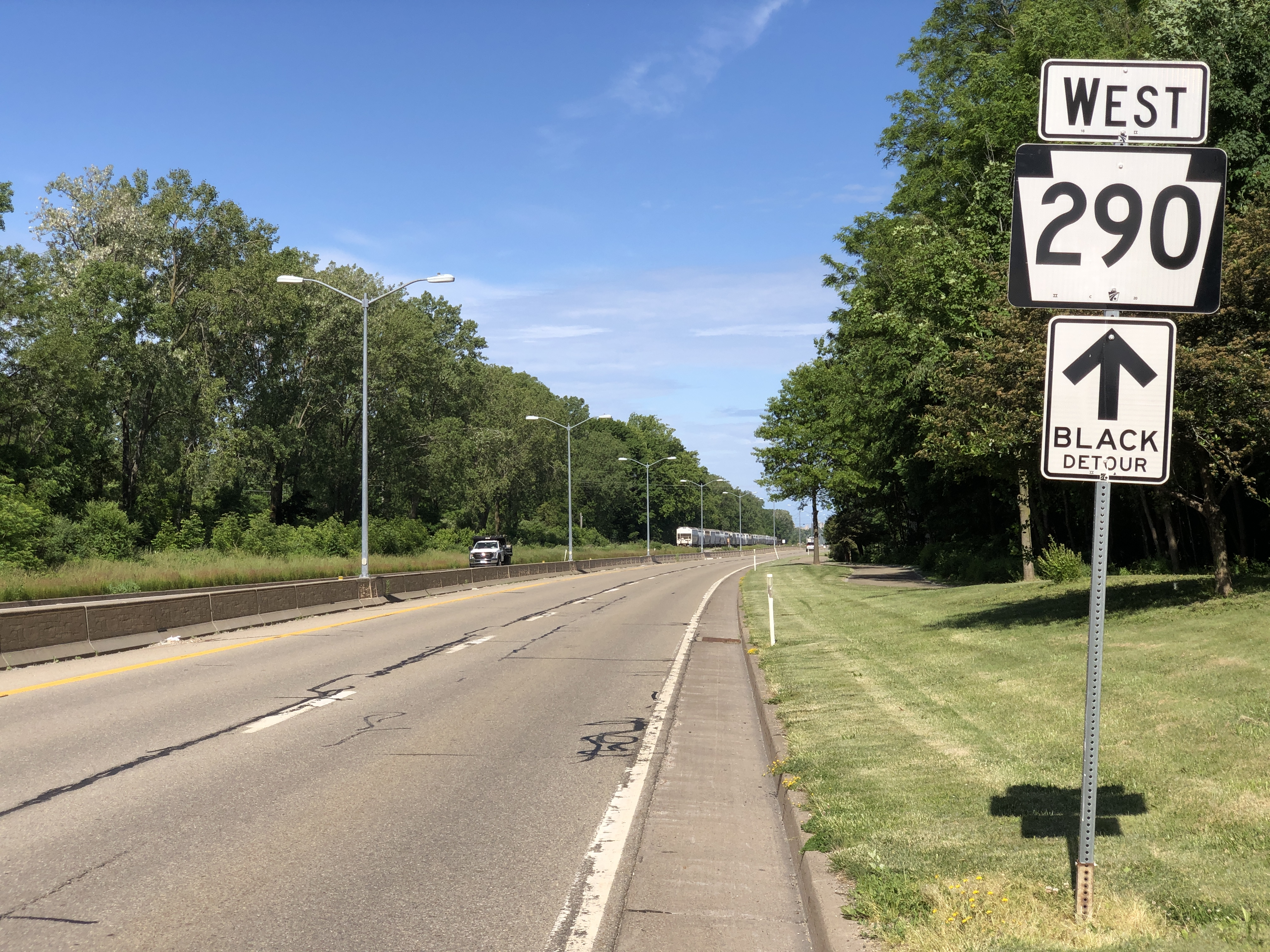
PA 290 westbound in Erie

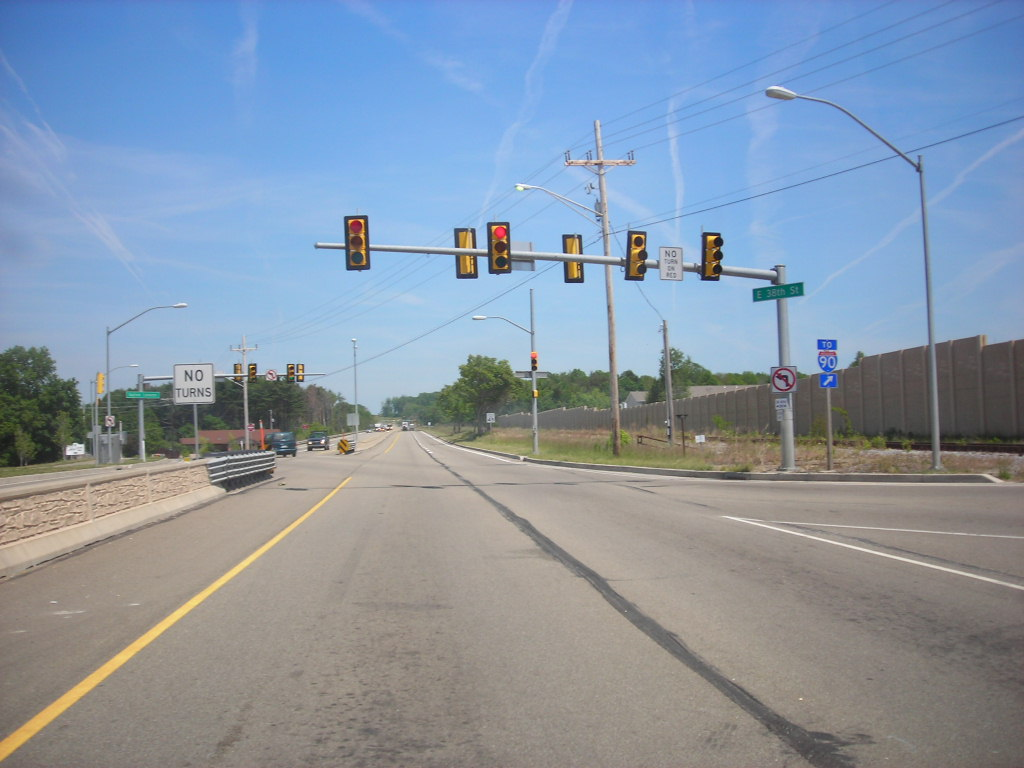
Southbound Bayfront Connector at 38th Street.

PA 290 officially begins at I-79 exit 183, less than a quarter of a mile from where I-79 terminates at the Bayfront Parkway. After exiting the off-ramps, PA 290 embarks on a concurrency with PA 5 eastward through downtown Erie on 12th Street, passing south of Louis J. Tullio Arena and UPMC Park in the heart of downtown. At the Bayfront Connector, an extension of the Bayfront Parkway, PA 290 breaks from PA 5 and turns to the east onto the Connector.

As part of the Bayfront Connector, PA 290 interchanges with U.S. Route 20 a mile from PA 5 prior to following the Connector out of the city. Roughly a mile northwest of I-90, the Connector passes north of Penn State Behrend and merges into PA 430, creating a concurrency between PA 290 and PA 430. The two routes remain conjoined to I-90 exit 32, where PA 290 terminates on the southeast side of the interchange.

== History ==
The highway was formed in order to create a high-speed loop for traffic between I-90 and I-79, which begins at the end of the Bayfront Parkway, as well as to help promote the 12th Street corridor as a viable alternate route to the congested Bayfront Parkway.

== Major intersections ==
The entire route is in Erie County.

Location	mi	km	Destinations	Notes
Erie	0.000	0.000	I-79 south / PA 5 west (West 12th Street) – Pittsburgh	Western terminus of PA 290 and its concurrency with PA 5. Exit 183 (I-79).
Erie	3.543	5.702	PA 5 east (East 12th Street) / Bayfront Parkway	Eastern terminus of concurrency with PA 5.
Erie	4.648	7.480	US 20 (Broad Street)	Interchange
Harborcreek Township	7.912	12.733	PA 430 west (Station Road) / Jordan Road – Penn State Erie	Western terminus of concurrency with PA 430.
Harborcreek Township	8.876	14.285	I-90 – Buffalo, Erie	Exit 32 (I-90).
Harborcreek Township	9.173	14.763	PA 430 east (Station Road)	Eastern terminus of concurrency with PA 430; eastern terminus of PA 290
1.000 mi = 1.609 km; 1.000 km = 0.621 mi: Concurrency terminus

== Bayfront Connector ==
Bayfront Connector
- Location: Erie–Harborcreek Township
- Length: 5.34 mi (8.59 km)
- Existed: 2005–present

The Bayfront Connector is a 5.34-mile (8.59 km),^{[a]} four-lane expressway that connects Interstate 90 to downtown Erie, Pennsylvania; it is continuous with Route 290 throughout its length.

At the intersection of East 12th Street, the Bayfront Parkway becomes the Bayfront Connector and picks up the concurrency with Pennsylvania Route 290. After it bridges the railroad tracks owned by CSX, the Connector parallels the tracks for Norfolk Southern. The Connector intersects East 38th Street at angle, prohibiting turns onto 38th Street. After the intersection of Shannon Road, the Bayfront Connector stops paralleling railroad tracks and crosses Fourmile Creek over the Wintergreen Gorge Bridge. The concurrency for Pennsylvania Route 430 begins at the intersection with Station Road. The entrance to Penn State Erie is on the Connector at the intersection for Hannon Road and Knowledge Parkway. The Bayfront Connector terminates, along with PA 290, at the I-90 interchange, while PA 430 continues as Station Road.

The Bayfront Connector opened on June 17, 2005, and was dedicated a week later on June 24.

== Notes ==
a. PennDOT lists the official meausurement of the Bayfront Connector as 6.2 miles (10.0 km) long. The 0.9-mile (1.4 km) segment from the Bayfront Parkway to East 12th Street, which was built as part of the East Side Access Highway project, was counted as part of the Connector but is signed and designated as part of the Parkway.
