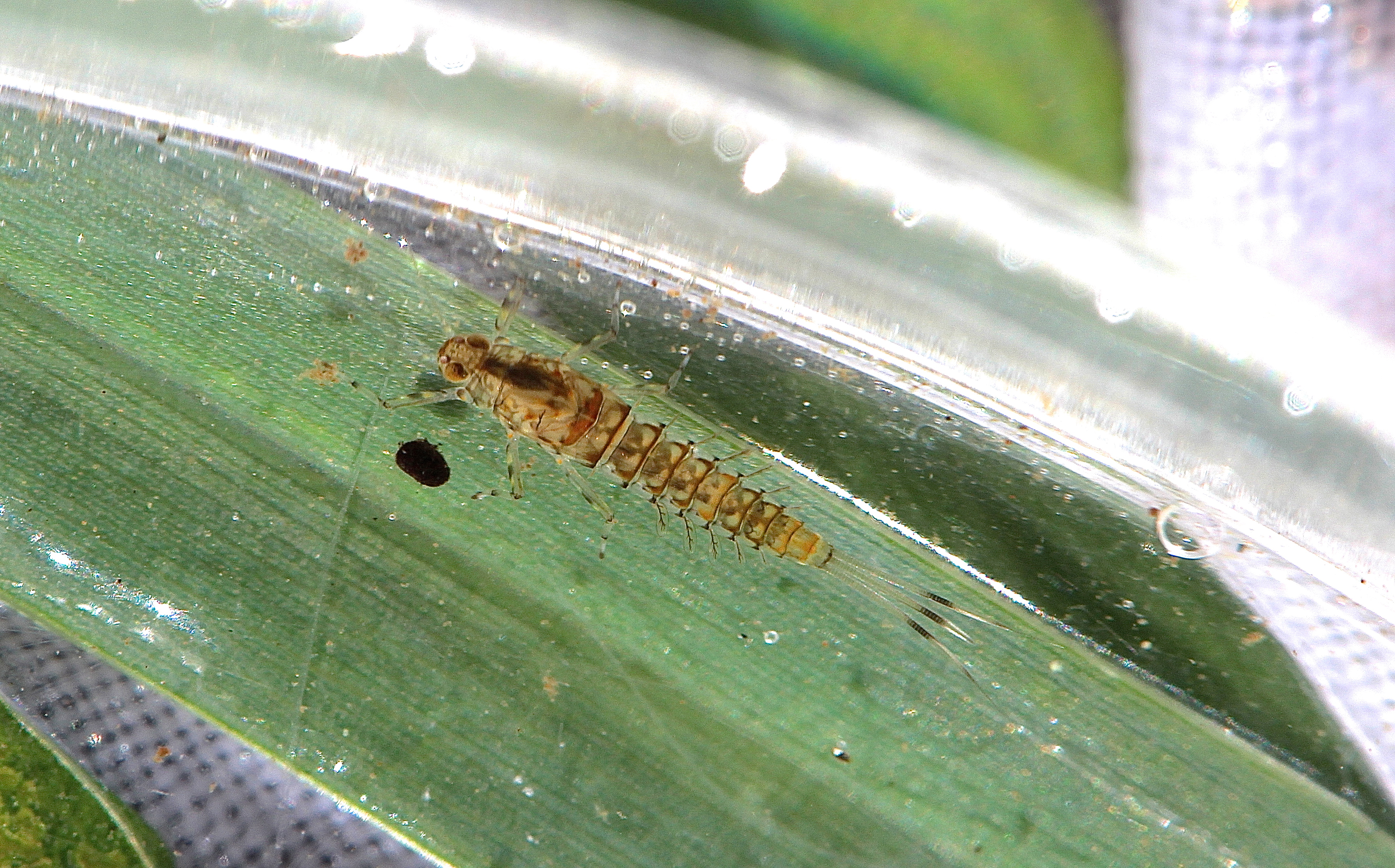

Scientific classification
- Domain: Eukaryota
- Kingdom: Animalia
- Phylum: Arthropoda
- Class: Insecta
- Order: Ephemeroptera
- Family: Baetidae
- Genus: Baetis
- Species: B. flavistriga

Binomial name
- Baetis flavistriga McDunnough, 1921

Synonyms
- Baetis caurinus Edmunds and Allen, 1957; Baetis cingulatus McDunnough, 1925; Baetis levitans McDunnough, 1925; Baetis nanus McDunnough, 1923; Baetis ochris Burks, 1953; Baetis pallidulus McDunnough, 1924; Baetis phoebus McDunnough, 1923; Baetis quebecensis Hubbard, 1974; Baetis sinuosus Navás, 1924

= Baetis flavistriga =

Species of mayfly

Baetis flavistriga is a species of small minnow mayfly in the family Baetidae. It is found in Central America and North America. In North America its range includes all of Canada, all of Mexico, and the continental United States.
