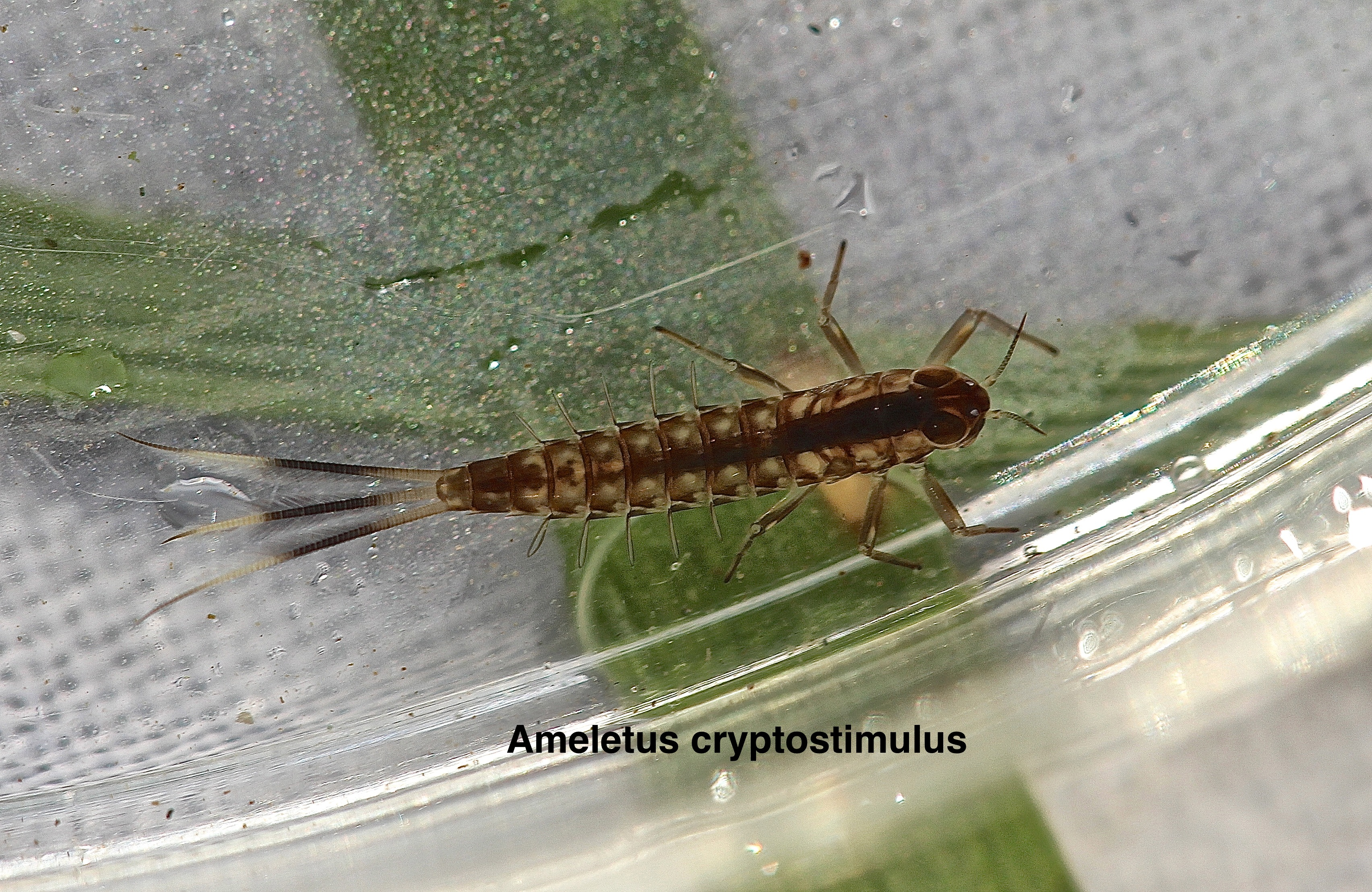
- Ameletus cryptostimulus

Scientific classification
- Kingdom: Animalia
- Phylum: Arthropoda
- Class: Insecta
- Order: Ephemeroptera
- Family: Ameletidae
- Genus: Ameletus; Eaton, 1865

Type species
- Ameletus subnotatus Eaton, 1885

Synonyms
- Chimura Navás, 1915; Paleoameletus Lestage, 1940

= Ameletus =

Genus of mayflies

Ameletus is a genus of mayfly and the type genus of the family Ameletidae.

== Taxonomic history ==
Ameletus was circumscribed by Rev. A. E. Eaton in 1885. His initial circumscription included three species, all of which were described in the same paper: the type species A. dissitus, A. subnotatus, and A. exquisitus.

R. P. Longinus Navás circumscribed the genus Chimura in 1915. It only consisted of its type species, the newly described C. aetherea. In 1960, Edmunds synonymized Chimura with Ameletus.

Paleoameletus was circumscribed by J. A. Lestage in 1940; he created it for the species A. primitivus which J. R. Traver had described the previous year. George F. Edmunds, Jr., and Jay R. Traver synonymized Paleoameletus with Ameletus in 1954.

== Species ==
Ameletus species include:

- A. amador Mayo, 1939
- A. andersoni Zloty, 1996
- A. bellulus Zloty, 1996
- A. browni McDunnough, 1933
- A. celer McDunnough, 1934
- A. cooki McDunnough, 1929
- A. cryptostimulus Carle, 1978
- A. dissitus Eaton, 1885
- A. doddsianus Zloty, 1996
- A. edmundsi Zloty, 1996
- A. exquisitus Eaton, 1885
- A. falsus McDunnough, 1938
- A. imbellis Day, 1952
- A. inopinatus Eaton, 1887
- A. lineatus Traver, 1932
- A. ludens Needham, 1905
- A. majusculus Zloty, 1996
- A. minimus Zloty & Harper, 1999
- A. oregonensis McDunnough, 1933
- A. oregonensis Zloty, 1996
- A. quadratus Zloty & Harper, 1999
- A. shepherdi Traver, 1934
- A. similior McDunnough, 1928
- A. sparsatus McDunnough, 1931
- A. subnotatus Eaton, 1885
- A. suffusus McDunnough, 1936
- A. tarteri Burrows, 1987
- A. tertius McDunnough, 1938
- A. tolae Zloty, 1996
- A. validus McDunnough, 1923
- A. vancouverensis McDunnough, 1933
- A. velox Dodds, 1923
- A. vernalis McDunnough, 1924
- A. walleyi Harper, 1970
