= Baetis alius =

Scientific classification
- Domain: Eukaryota
- Kingdom: Animalia
- Phylum: Arthropoda
- Class: Insecta
- Order: Ephemeroptera
- Family: Baetidae
- Genus: Baetis
- Species: B. alius

Binomial name
- Baetis alius Day, 1954

Synonyms
- Baetis moqui Wiersema, Nelson and Kuehnl, 2005

Species of mayfly

Baetis alius is a species of small minnow mayfly in the family Baetidae. It is found in the northwestern United States.
