= Bayfront Parkway =

- State Route 4034
- Bayfront Parkway highlighted in red

Route information
- Length: 4.580 mi (7.371 km)

Major junctions
- West end: I-79 in Erie
- PA 5 Alt. in Erie
- East end: PA 5 / PA 290 in Erie

Location
- Country: United States
- State: Pennsylvania
- Counties: Erie

Highway system
- Pennsylvania State Route System; Interstate; US; State; Scenic; Legislative

The Bayfront Parkway is a highway in Erie, Pennsylvania, in the United States, primarily running along the shore of Lake Erie's Presque Isle Bay. It continues as Interstate 79 (I-79) on the western end and the Bayfront Connector, part of Pennsylvania Route 290 (PA 290), on the eastern end.

== Route description ==
The Bayfront Parkway begins at the northern terminus of I-79 in the city of Erie, proceeding generally northward and passing under PA 5 Alternate without an interchange. The road then turns east-northeast to follow the south shore of Presque Isle Bay, passing such landmarks as the Bayfront Convention Center, the Erie Maritime Museum, the Erie Intermodal Transportation Center, and Fort Presque Isle, while passing north of downtown Erie. Bayfront Parkway turns southeast to head away from Presque Isle Bay at the Port Access Road/East Bay Drive intersection, intersecting PA 5 Alternate just south of the bay. The Bayfront Parkway ends at a junction with PA 5/PA 290, at which point the road continues southeast as PA 290 (Bayfront Connector).

== History ==
The Bayfront Parkway was built at the end of the 20th century primarily along old railroad right-of-way. The section west of State Street was built first. This section is named the Italo S. Cappabianca Memorial Highway.

As of 2025 a project on the Bayfront Parkway is underway "to improve the pedestrian, bicycle, transit, and passenger vehicle connection of the Erie Central Business District and adjacent neighborhoods to the waterfront property north of the Bayfront Parkway (SR 4034), to reduce crashes as much as practical on the Bayfront Parkway, to improve future congestion to an acceptable level of service or delay, and to improve traffic operations and efficiency." The improvements include roundabouts and an interchange.

== Major intersections ==
The entire route is in Erie, Erie County.

mi	km	Destinations	Notes
0.000	0.000	I-79 south – Pittsburgh	Western terminus; northern terminus of I-79
4.109	6.613	PA 5 Alt. (East 6th Street)	
4.580	7.371	PA 5 / PA 290 west (East 12th Street) PA 290 east (Bayfront Connector)	Eastern terminus
1.000 mi = 1.609 km; 1.000 km = 0.621 mi
