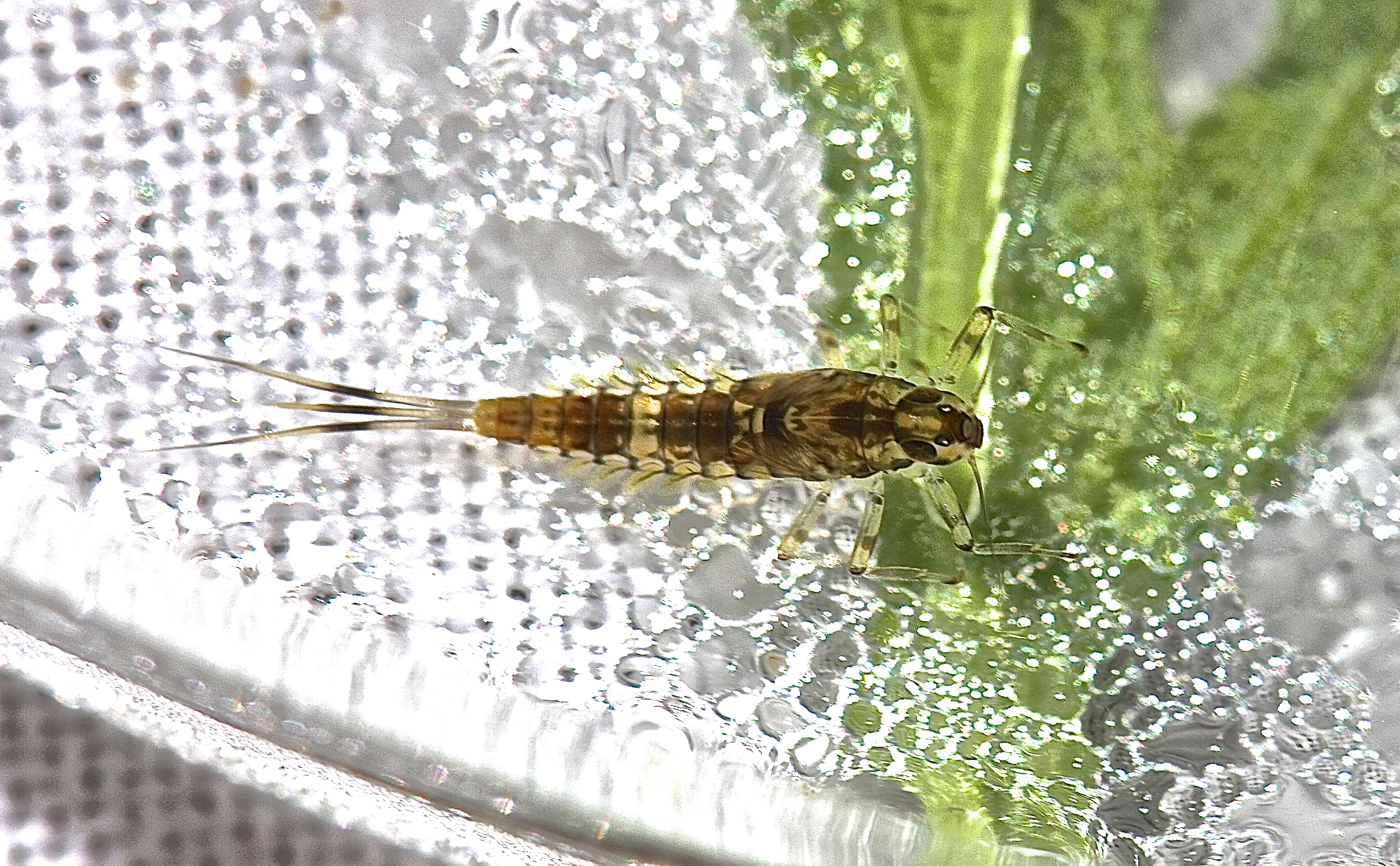

Scientific classification
- Domain: Eukaryota
- Kingdom: Animalia
- Phylum: Arthropoda
- Class: Insecta
- Order: Ephemeroptera
- Family: Baetidae
- Genus: Baetis
- Species: B. pluto

Binomial name
- Baetis pluto McDunnough, 1925

= Baetis pluto =

Species of mayfly

Baetis pluto is a species of small minnow mayfly in the family Baetidae. It is found in North America.
