= Baetis brunneicolor =

Scientific classification
- Domain: Eukaryota
- Kingdom: Animalia
- Phylum: Arthropoda
- Class: Insecta
- Order: Ephemeroptera
- Family: Baetidae
- Genus: Baetis
- Species: B. brunneicolor

Binomial name
- Baetis brunneicolor McDunnough, 1925

Synonyms
- Baetis anachris Burks, 1953; Baetis hiemalis Leonard, 1950; Baetis phyllis Burks, 1953

Species of mayfly

Baetis brunneicolor is a species of small minnow mayfly in the family Baetidae. It is found in all of Canada, the northern, and southeastern United States.
