= Baetis notos =

Scientific classification
- Domain: Eukaryota
- Kingdom: Animalia
- Phylum: Arthropoda
- Class: Insecta
- Order: Ephemeroptera
- Family: Baetidae
- Genus: Baetis
- Species: B. notos

Binomial name
- Baetis notos Allen & Murvosh, 1987

Species of mayfly

Baetis notos is a species of small minnow mayfly in the family Baetidae. It is found in Central America and North America. In North America its range includes southern Mexico, the southern, and northwestern United States.
