= Baetis bicaudatus =

Scientific classification
- Domain: Eukaryota
- Kingdom: Animalia
- Phylum: Arthropoda
- Class: Insecta
- Order: Ephemeroptera
- Family: Baetidae
- Genus: Baetis
- Species: B. bicaudatus

Binomial name
- Baetis bicaudatus Dodds, 1923

Synonyms
- Baetis minimus Dodds, 1923

Species of mayfly

Baetis bicaudatus is a species of small minnow mayfly in the family Baetidae. It is found in southwestern, northern Canada, the western United States, and Alaska.
