= Twelvemile Creek (Pennsylvania) =

River in Erie County, Pennsylvania

Coordinates: 42°12′43″N 79°54′53″W

Twelvemile Creek is a tributary of Lake Erie located in Erie County in the U.S. state of Pennsylvania.

== Course ==
Twelvemile Creek joins Lake Erie in Harborcreek Township.

== Natural history ==
Twelvemile Creek is stocked with steelhead by the Pennsylvania Fish Commission. Crayfish, frogs and waterbugs are plentiful. The stream also has many natural small waterfalls made of Pennsylvania Blue stone.

== See also ==
- List of rivers of Pennsylvania
