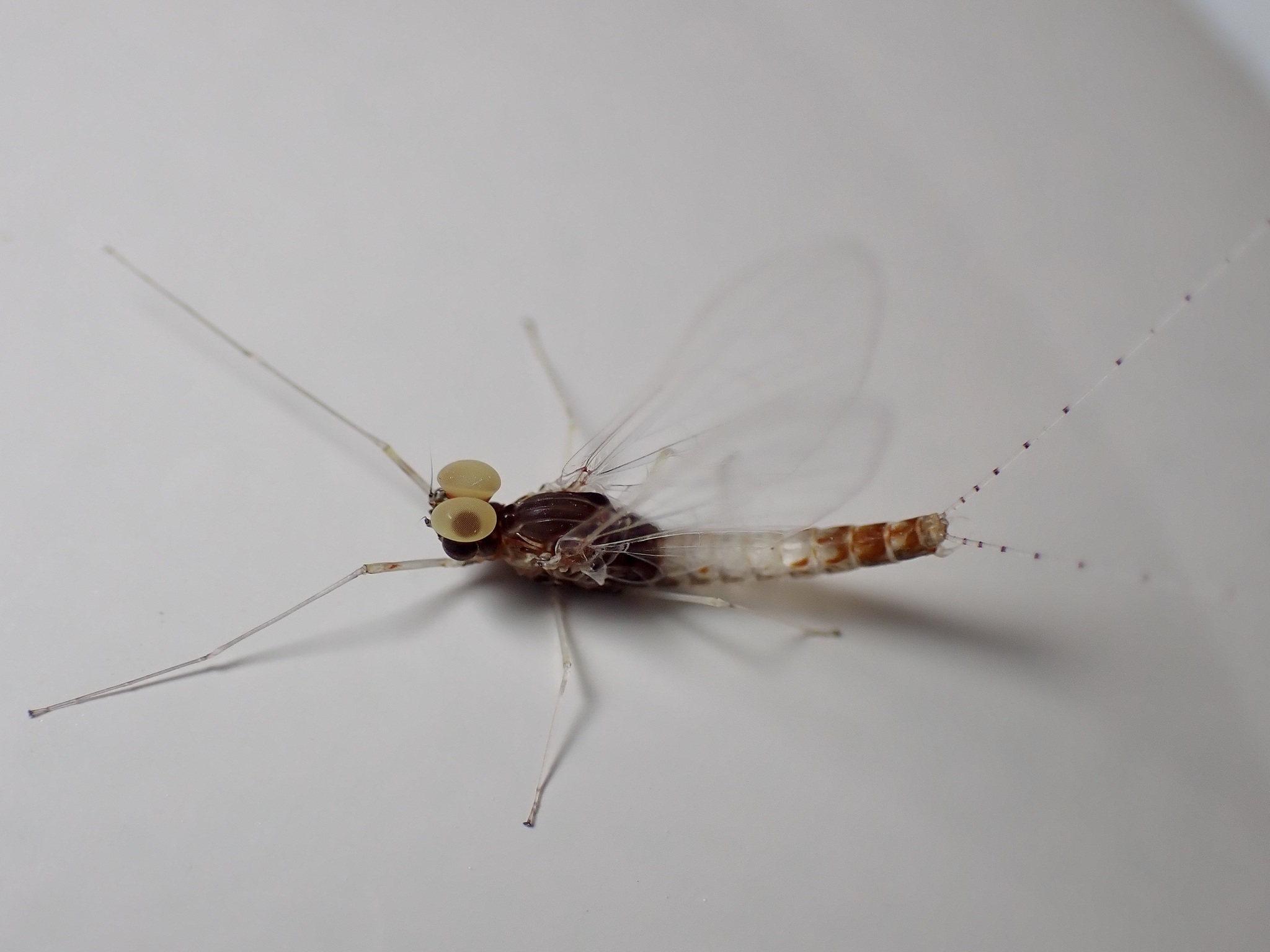

Scientific classification
- Domain: Eukaryota
- Kingdom: Animalia
- Phylum: Arthropoda
- Class: Insecta
- Order: Ephemeroptera
- Family: Baetidae
- Genus: Baetis
- Species: B. fuscatus

Binomial name
- Baetis fuscatus (Linnaeus, 1761)

= Baetis fuscatus =

Species of insect

Baetis fuscatus is the type species of the genus Baetis: it is a European mayfly and was originally described as Ephemera fuscata by Linnaeus in 1761, before assignment to the new genus by W.E. Leach.
