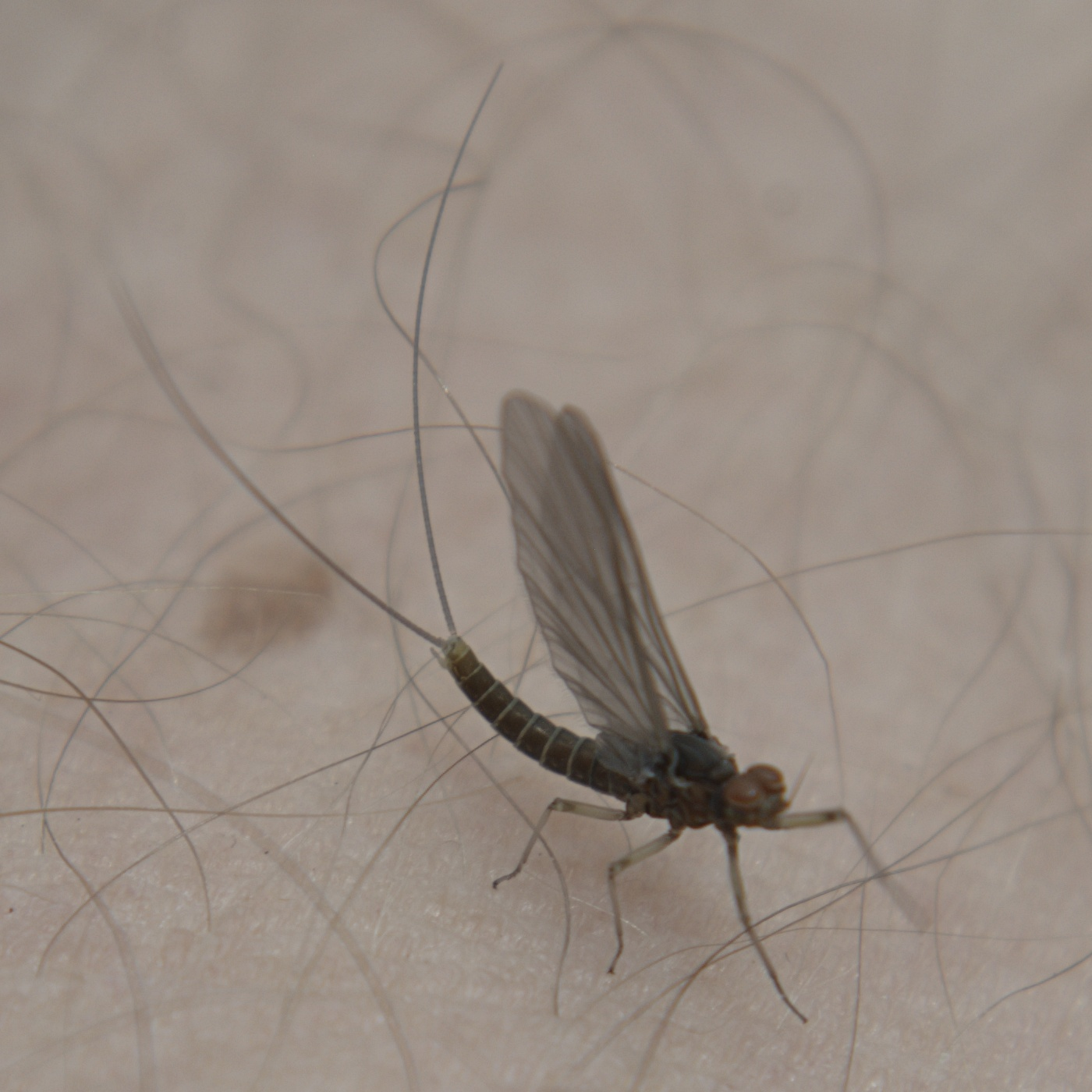

Scientific classification
- Domain: Eukaryota
- Kingdom: Animalia
- Phylum: Arthropoda
- Class: Insecta
- Order: Ephemeroptera
- Family: Baetidae
- Genus: Baetis
- Species: B. tricaudatus

Binomial name
- Baetis tricaudatus Dodds, 1923

Synonyms
- Baetis incertans McDunnough, 1925; Baetis intermedius Dodds, 1923; Baetis jesmondensis McDunnough, 1938; Baetis moffatti Dodds, 1923; Baetis parallelus Banks, 1924; Baetis vagans McDunnough, 1925

= Baetis tricaudatus =

Species of insect

Baetis tricaudatus is a species of small minnow mayfly in the family Baetidae. It is found in Central America and North America. In North America its range includes all of Canada, all of Mexico, and the continental United States.
