= Penn State Erie, The Behrend College =

Satellite campus of Penn State in Eerie, Pennsylvania, U.S.

Coordinates: 42.119402°N 79.988773°W

Penn State Behrend
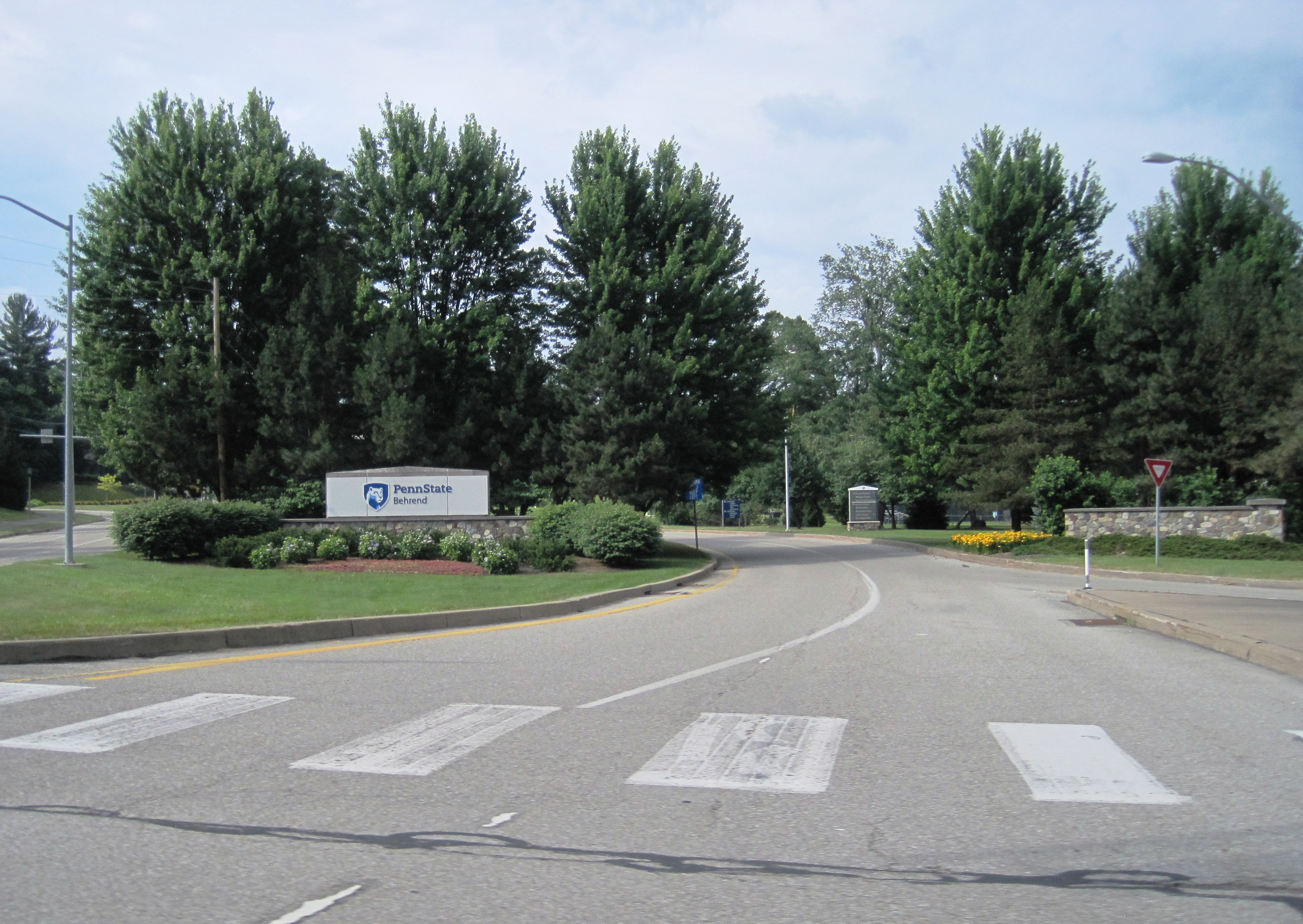
- Former names: Behrend Center (1948–1959); Behrend Campus of Penn State (1959–1973); Behrend College of the Pennsylvania State University (1973–1987)
- Type: Public satellite campus
- Established: June 28, 1948; 78 years ago
- Parent institution: Pennsylvania State University
- Chancellor: Ralph Ford
- President: Neeli Bendapudi
- Faculty: 200
- Students: 3,296 (Fall 2025)
- Undergraduates: 3,211 (Fall 2025)
- Postgraduates: 85 (Fall 2025)
- Location: Erie, Pennsylvania, U.S.
- Campus: 854 acres (3.46 km^{2})
- Colors: Dark Royal Blue and White
- Nickname: Behrend Lions
- Sporting affiliations: NCAA Division III - AMCC, CWPA, MPSF
- Mascot: Nittany Lion
- Website: behrend.psu.edu

Penn State Erie, The Behrend College, officially Pennsylvania State University at Erie, The Behrend College and often shortened to Penn State Behrend, is a public satellite campus of Penn State University and is located near Erie, Pennsylvania, United States. It is among the largest of Penn State's commonwealth campuses, with about 4,400 students enrolled in Behrend programs on campus and online. The college offers more than 40 undergraduate majors in four academic schools: The Sam and Irene Black School of Business, the School of Engineering, the School of Humanities and Social Sciences, and the School of Science, which includes the Nursing Program. Penn State Behrend also offers five master's degrees, as well as a range of continuing education trainings through its Community and Workforce Programs.

== History ==
The land that became Penn State Behrend was donated to the university by Mary Behrend on June 28, 1948 in memory of her husband, Ernst, co-founder of Hammermill Paper Company. The first class of 146 students enrolled at what was then known as the Behrend Center of Pennsylvania State College that fall.

When the Penn State system was reorganized in 1959, The Behrend Center became the Behrend campus of Penn State. Enrollments and the physical presence of the campus grew quickly in the 1960s and early 1970s. On January 20, 1973, the Penn State Board of Trustees granted four-year college and graduate status to Penn State Behrend, making it the first Penn State location outside University Park to achieve such status. At that time, the school was renamed as the Behrend College of the Pennsylvania State University. The school took on its current name, the Pennsylvania State University at Erie, The Behrend College, in 1987.

== Campus ==
Penn State Behrend's 854-acre campus includes more than fifty buildings, a recognized arboretum, and the scenic Wintergreen Gorge, a six-mile canyon.

The college is also home to Knowledge Park, a 100-acre research and development complex on campus, with 21 businesses employing 600 people.

The newest building on campus is Erie Hall, a $28.2 million fitness, recreation, and wellness center that replaced the college's original athletics gymnasium, also called Erie Hall.

== Academics ==
The average class size is 21, and the student-to-faculty ratio is 12:1. The college offers four associate degrees, nearly 40 bachelor's degrees, and five master's degrees, as well as more than 50 minors and certificates.

Penn State Behrend is accredited by the Middle States Commission on Higher Education.

== Student life ==
Undergraduate demographics as of Fall 2023
Race and ethnicity	Total
White	77%
Asian	5%
International student	5%
Black	4%
Hispanic	4%
Two or more races	3%
Unknown	2%
Economic diversity
Low-income (Note: The percentage of students who received an income-based federal Pell grant intended for low-income students.)	28%
Affluent (Note: The percentage of students who are a part of the American middle class at the bare minimum.)	72%

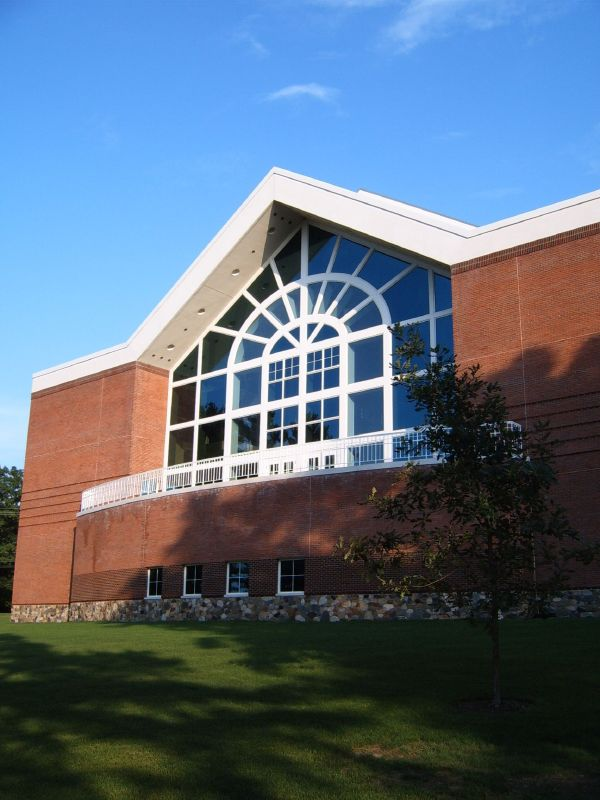
Lilley Library, Penn State Erie

Penn State Behrend offers more than 140 clubs and organizations on campus, including academic clubs, fraternities and sororities, service organizations, and cultural societies.

=== The Behrend Beacon ===
The Behrend Beacon is the student newspaper. It is published weekly during the academic year.

=== BVZ Radio ===
The college is also home to BVZ Radio ("The Voice Of Behrend"), an online streaming radio station. The station is managed by a student management team. All show programming is produced by students. BVZ often broadcasts live events on the Behrend campus and in the Erie area.

=== Fraternities and Sororities ===
Behrend has a Greek life system with several fraternities and sororities on campus:

==== Sororities ====
ΑΣΑ (Alpha Sigma Alpha) - Epsilon Theta chapter

ΑΣΤ (Alpha Sigma Tau) - Gamma Theta chapter

ΘΦΑ (Theta Phi Alpha) - Gamma Alpha chapter

==== Fraternities ====
ΔΧ (Delta Chi)

ΚΣ (Kappa Sigma) - Phi Delta chapter

ΣΤΓ (Sigma Tau Gamma) - Delta Upsilon chapter

Triangle

== Athletics ==
Penn State Behrend men and women compete as the Behrend Lions in 24 varsity sports. Penn State Behrend is a member of NCAA Division III, the Allegheny Mountain Collegiate Conference and the Eastern College Athletic Conference.

=== Varsity sports ===
Men's sports	Women's sports
Baseball	Basketball
Basketball	Bowling
Cross country	Cross country
Golf	Golf
Soccer	Soccer
Swimming	Softball
Tennis	Swimming
Track and Field^{1}	Tennis
Volleyball	Track and Field^{1}
Water polo	Volleyball
Wrestling	Water polo
^{1} – includes both indoor and outdoor

=== Club sports ===
Students also participate in five intercollegiate club teams: cheerleading, ice hockey, and men's and women's lacrosse, and rugby. Behrend also has a competitive esports team.

== Points of interest ==
- Arboretum at Penn State Behrend
- Wintergreen Gorge
