= Arboretum at Penn State Behrend =

Arboretum in Erie, Pennsylvania

Coordinates: 42.12109°N 79.98244°W

- Interactive map of Arboretum at Penn State Behrend
- Type: Arboretum
- Area: 725 acres (2.93 km^{2})
- Website: Official website

The Arboretum at Penn State Behrend 725 acres (2.93 km^{2}) is an arboretum located on the campus of Penn State Behrend, in Erie, Pennsylvania and is open to the public without charge.

The arboretum was dedicated in 2003. It contains more than 200 species of trees and woody bushes including collections of Aceraceae, Aquifoliaceae, Arecaceae, Betulaceae, Caesalpiniaceae, Cornaceae, Cupressaceae, Ebenaceae, Ericaceae, Euphorbiaceae, Fabaceae, Fagaceae, Ginkgoaceae, Hamamelidaceae, Hippocastanaceae, Juglandaceae, Magnoliaceae, Moraceae, Nyssaceae, Oleaceae, Pinaceae, Rosaceae, Salicaceae, Sciadopityaceae, Taxodiaceae, Theaceae, and Ulmaceae.

In 2003, the college gained membership in the American Public Gardens Association. This formalized the college's status as an arboretum, opening the way to development of public education, outreach, and research programs, as well as continued conservation of the area.

Ernst and Mary Behrend, the original owners of the Penn State Behrend property, began acquiring many exotic trees, including trees from Asia, when they lived on the site. The first major gift to the arboretum was from the Carrie T. Watson Garden Club, which donated flowering crabapples in 1952.

== See also ==
- List of botanical gardens in the United States
