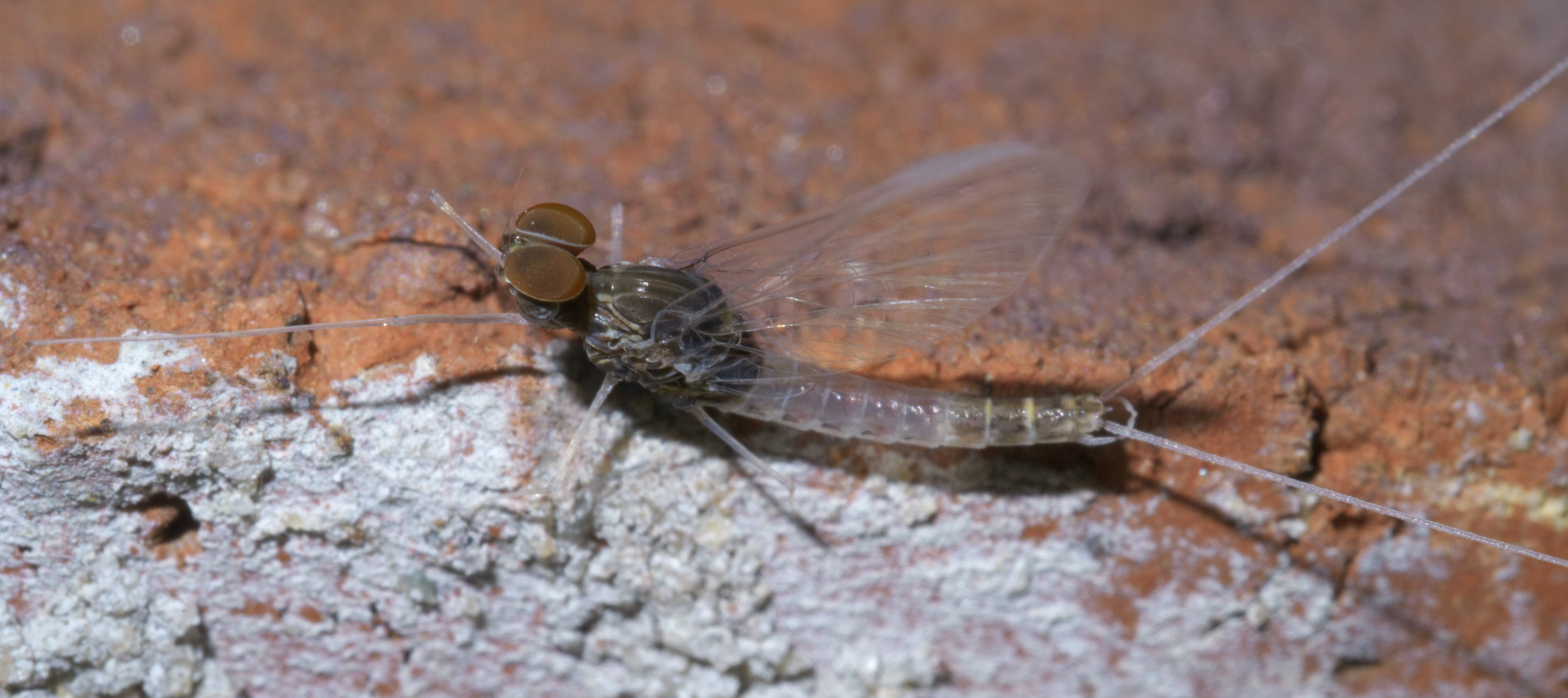
- Baetis intercalaris

Scientific classification
- Kingdom: Animalia
- Phylum: Arthropoda
- Class: Insecta
- Order: Ephemeroptera
- Family: Baetidae
- Subfamily: Baetinae
- Genus: Baetis; Leach, 1815

Diversity
- at least 150 species

= Baetis =

Genus of insects

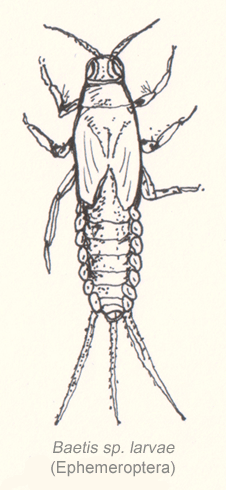
Nymph

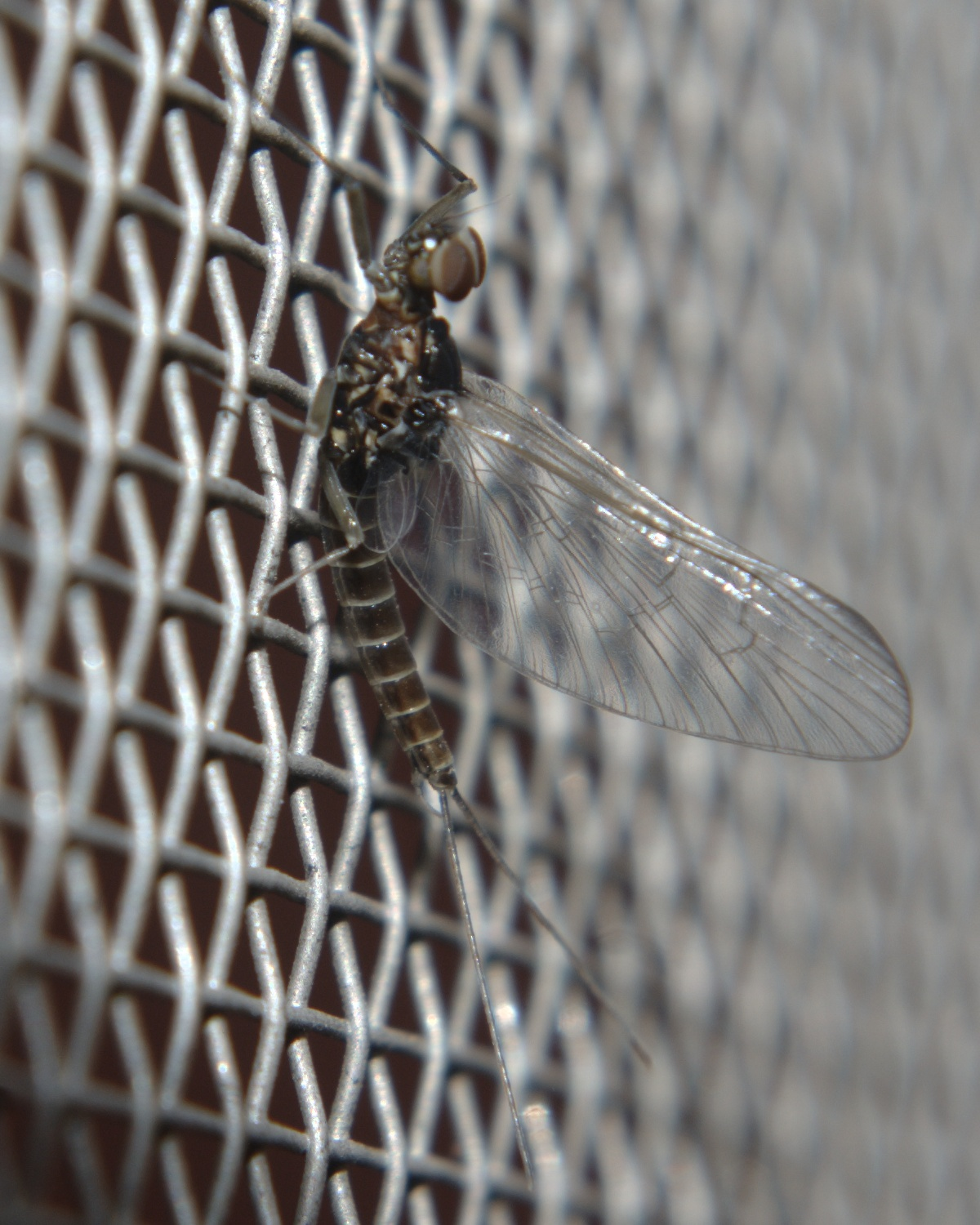
Male imago of Baetis tricaudatus

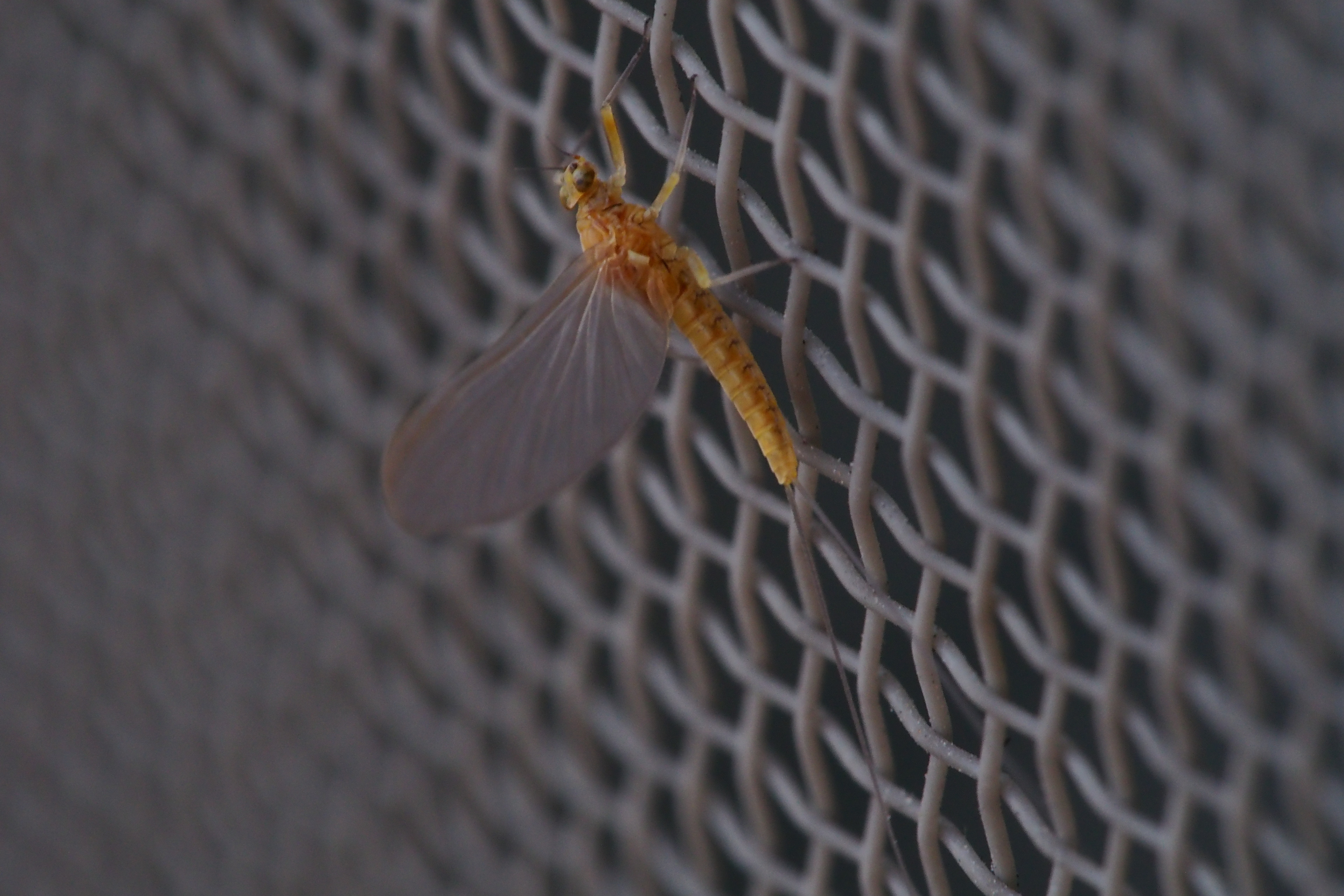
Baetis sahoensis

Baetis is a genus of mayflies of the family Baetidae, commonly known as blue-winged olives to anglers. There are at least 150 described species in the genus Baetis. They are distributed worldwide, with the most variety in North America and northern Europe.

== Selected species ==
About 48 species occur in Europe including:

- Baetis alpinus (Pictet, 1843)
- Baetis atrebatinus Eaton, 1870
- Baetis bicaudatus Dodds, 1923
- Baetis buceratus Eaton, 1870
- Baetis cypronyx Godunko, Soldán & Staniczek, 2017
- Baetis fuscatus (Linnaeus, 1761) - type species (as Ephemera fuscata Linnaeus, 1761)
- Baetis muticus (Linnaeus, 1758)
- Baetis niger (Linnaeus, 1761)
- Baetis rhodani (Pictet, 1843)
- Baetis scambus Eaton, 1870
- Baetis vernus Curtis, 1834
