= Ameletidae =

Scientific classification
- Kingdom: Animalia
- Phylum: Arthropoda
- Class: Insecta
- Order: Ephemeroptera
- Suborder: Pisciforma
- Family: Ameletidae; McCafferty, 1991

Genera
- Ameletus Eaton, 1865; Metreletus Demoulin, 1951; Electroletus Godunko & Neumann, 2006

Family of mayflies

Ameletidae, the combmouthed minnow mayflies, is a family of mayfly.
