= Boys State and Girls State =

American leadership and citizenship programs

The American Legion Boys State and American Legion Auxiliary Girls State are week-long summer leadership and citizenship programs for high school juniors that help students learn the mechanics of American government and politics. The programs are sponsored by the American Legion (AL) and the American Legion Auxiliary (ALA), respectively. Students are usually nominated by their high school during their junior year. Male and female students from each high school are then selected to receive the honor after a competitive application process. Once attending, students are given the opportunity to simulate local-level and state-level politics through mock elections and government positions. Both Boys and Girls State began in 1937.

== Procedures and Activities ==
Boys/Girls State is typically staffed by Legion Family members, past participants, and/or community leaders who volunteer their time and effort. Administrative costs are defrayed by their state Legion organizations and local businesses.

Each state's program varies, but generally program participants are divided into subgroups referred to as cities or towns. Most programs will assign citizens to one of two political parties. These parties are generally not representative of existing American parties. Delegates in many programs meet as parties and craft their own unique party platforms from scratch. Some parties carry their platforms over from year to year. Although most programs assign citizens randomly to a political party, a few programs have an ideological sorting mechanism to place delegates in a political party with others holding similar views. The citizens of each of these cities elect mock municipal officials, county officials, and representatives to the mock state legislature. Many programs also have a county level as well. The participants also elect state officials, such as governor, lieutenant governor, and other state-level officials mirroring their actual state. The legislature meets to organize, elect leaders, and to pass bills, in a way that is similar to how their actual state legislature operates. Some programs tend to have a more traditional education focus, providing speakers and training throughout the week and then concluding with mock political functions. Other programs take a more hands-on approach by running the mock government activities all week. American Legion chaplains host an interdenominational Christian church service for participants on Sunday, prior to graduation from Boys State or Girls State.

All programs generally follow a similar pattern, but vary by state. Some states (e.g. Nebraska) hold mock trials with the participants volunteering as lawyers, accused, and juries. Some states include a journalism component that represents the Fourth Estate in the political process. North Dakota includes a classroom-based emergency management simulation that requires participants to respond to various large-scale disasters by managing communication, resources and personnel. Other programs include creative and fun activities such as band, choir, talent shows, and athletic competition. Some of the programs (e.g., New Mexico) host a dance during the week, inviting high school girls/boys from the area to attend. The Oregon program has moved away from using any mock systems to a completely simulated "State of Christensen" with its own law and order system that grows yearly and is passed on to the consecutive year.

Boys State and Girls State honors programs are held in each of the U.S. states (except Hawaii where there is only a Girls State program), usually at a college within that state. There is a coed Boys/Girls State session held in Washington, D.C., which is sponsored by both the American Legion and American Legion Auxiliary. California has a coeducational program called "California Boys and Girls State" run by the American Legion. California Girls State continues as a separate program run by the American Legion Auxiliary. With exceptions, including but not limited to California, male and female programs are held separately, but at least nine states—Georgia, Nebraska, Oregon, Louisiana, Massachusetts, Pennsylvania, New Hampshire, Rhode Island, Maine, and Missouri—host Boys and Girls State on the same campus on the same week.

== Selection ==
Selection varies by state and by girls or boys state program. Historically, in most states, only one or two students are sent to Boys/Girls State from each high school. Therefore, selection is highly competitive, and the population of students attending represents the top talent from across the state. Although recruitment procedures vary, Boys/Girls State participants are often selected with the help of high school principals or guidance counselors. Participants must be between their junior and senior years in high school to qualify.

== Benefits ==
Because the hundreds of students at any given Boys/Girls State represent the top talent of that age year, being elected to a high office, such as governor, at the event can be an important distinguishing achievement for college or military academy admissions.

While each state's offerings differ, many programs offer college credit to those attending Boys/Girls State. Additionally many colleges and universities offer scholarships and other awards to those attending a Boys/Girls State program. Also, the Samsung American Legion Scholarship, which can only be applied for by Boys/Girls State attenders, is an endowed scholarship fund of $5 million administered by the American Legion. In 2010, ten $20,000 scholarships and 88 $1,000 scholarships were awarded to those who completed a Boys/Girls State program. Attendance at Boys State carries the same weight on a résumé as earning the distinction of Eagle Scout, especially when applying to US military schools and academies.

== Events ==
Once there, students typically engage in a number of political activities such as running for office, electing officials, drafting and debating bills, and making motions. Some programs offer city and county mock courts, and a state Supreme Court, with the participants acting as lawyers, judges, plaintiffs, defendants, and jury members. There are lectures and workshops for students to fully immerse themselves in government and politics. Parliamentary procedure (Robert's Rules of Order) is typically utilized.

A majority of programs divide their participants into two political parties: Nationalists and Federalists. Each political party establishes an official party platform voted on by its members. Participants are elected to a variety of offices including House of Representatives and Senate seats, executive offices (governor, lieutenant governor, secretary of state, treasurer, etc.). Participants also run for city and county offices such as mayor, county clerk, municipal judge, city councilman, and many more depending on the individual program's setup.

Some programs, given their proximity to their state capital, make a field trip to visit and have a tour and meet their representatives, if they are present.

Many programs handle aspects of their individual programs differently from other states. For example, New York Boys' State involves exposure to regimented military experiences, such as early-morning physical training and marching instruction provided by members of the US Marines.

Program directors and counselors meet at the annual American Legion Americanism Conference held in Indianapolis, IN each fall. This offers programs a platform to exchange ideas and best practices. The American Legion Auxiliary has a parallel program held at the same time.

== History ==
The national Boys State movement was founded in 1935 in Illinois by American Legionnaires Hayes Kennedy and Harold Card. At a time when authoritarian regimes were on the rise, the founders were alarmed by the influence of youth programs like the Hitler Youth in Nazi Germany and the Young Pioneer camps in the Soviet Union—programs that promoted loyalty to the state over individual freedom. In response, they created Boys State: a civics and leadership program designed to educate young Americans on the principles of representative democracy and the responsibilities of citizenship.

The Illinois Department of the American Legion approved Kennedy's and Card's project and in June 1935, the very first Boys State in the nation was held on the grounds of the Illinois State Fair.

As this program succeeded and spread throughout the United States, the American Legion Auxiliary (ALA) began providing similar opportunities for girls of high school age. Thus Girls State was founded. The first Girls State was conducted in 1937 and since 1948 has been a regular part of the ALA's better citizenship programs.

In 1981, Louisiana Boys State delegate Kirk Givens of Tioga High School in Pineville died when he fell or jumped out of his 12th floor Kirby-Smith dorm room window at Louisiana State University while sleepwalking.

A documentary film on the program, focused on 2018 Texas Boys State, premiered at the Sundance Film Festival in 2020. It was released on Apple TV+ on August 14, 2020. A "sibling" film about Missouri Girls State was planned to be shot during 2020 but was delayed due to the COVID-19 pandemic. Filming for the second documentary took place in 2022, and the film Girls State premiered at the Sundance in 2024. The documentary focused heavily on the gender inequities between the girls state and boys state programs.

In 2023, California Boys State went coed, in part by state law. About a third of the delegates at the inaugural session of California Boys and Girls State were girls. The 300 girls at the program were ineligible for consideration for Boys Nation and the American Legion Auxiliary Girls Nation. Congress and State officials within the California program organized a boycott from Boys Nation, citing that the American Legion's selection for the national program should be based on merit, not gender or sex. A resolution is set to be presented at the Boys Nation Senate, titled "WOMEN Resolution"

== Boys Nation and Girls Nation ==
Since 1947, each Boys State and Girls State program sends two delegates to Boys Nation and Girls Nation in Washington, D.C. Each state chooses their delegates differently. These delegates are sometimes the participants elected to the governor and lieutenant governor positions, but other states have separate elections for the honor, while still other states appoint their delegates through interviews with the Legionnaires who run each state program.

The event endeavors to teach delegates about the processes of federal government in the United States of America, through taking part in a mock Senate and mock elections of a Boys/Girls Nation Senate president pro tempore and secretary, vice president, and president, attending lectures, and visiting governmental institutions and historical sites.

== Notable alumni ==
Notable alumni of the Boys and Girls State programs include:

- Roger Ailes
- Fred Akers
- Lamar Alexander
- Samuel Alito
- Theresa Amato
- Clayton Anderson
- Rob Andrews
- Neil Armstrong
- Reubin Askew
- Bruce Babbitt
- Rosalyn Baker
- Scott Bakula
- David Barlow
- Barry K. Barnes
- William G. Batchelder
- Max Baucus
- Skip Bayless
- Mike Beebe
- Dick Bennett
- Ken Bennett
- Robert J. Bentley
- Eric Berry
- Beau Biden
- Matt Blunt
- Jim Bohannon
- Jon Bon Jovi
- Cory Booker
- Reuben Brigety
- Katie Britt
- Tom Brokaw
- Garth Brooks
- Jon Bruning
- Steve Bullock
- John W. Carlin
- Julian Carroll
- James Carville
- Dick Cheney
- Lawton Chiles
- Aneesh Chopra
- Chris Christie
- Wesley Clark
- Bill Clinton
- Mike Coffman
- Tim Cook
- Roy Cooper
- Richard Cordray
- Tom Cotton
- Mike Crapo
- Steve Daines
- Carroll Dale
- Mitch Daniels
- Tom Daschle
- Lawrence DiCara
- Lou Dobbs
- Steve Doocy
- Michael Dukakis
- Ericka Dunlap
- Dan Duquette
- Fred DuVal
- Roger Ebert
- Edwin Edwards
- John Ensign
- Michael Patrick Flanagan
- Robert Frederick Froehlke
- Russ Fulcher
- James Gandolfini
- Dan Gattis
- Charles D. Gemar
- Richard Gergel
- Michael L. Gernhardt
- Leeza Gibbons
- Paul Gillmor
- Alex Gorsky
- Randy Gradishar
- Chuck Grassley
- Jonathan Greenert
- Eric Greitens
- Robert Griffin III
- E. Lynn Harris
- Mike Hazen
- Dave Heineman
- Joel Heitkamp
- Terence T. Henricks
- Jess Herbst
- Hugh Hewitt
- John Hoeven
- Bob Holden
- Vonnie Holliday
- Ernest C. Hornsby
- Ken Howard
- Glenn Hubbard
- Mike Huckabee
- James Hunt
- Keith Jackson
- Phil Jackson
- Fishel Jacobs
- Donald M. James
- Fob James
- Al Jarreau
- Mike Johanns
- Joe Johns
- Dusty Johnson
- Gregory H. Johnson
- Gus Johnson
- Michelle D. Johnson
- Russell Jones
- Michael Jordan
- Phil Keisling
- Alan Keyes
- Angus King
- David Koechner
- Stan Kroenke
- Ted Kulongoski
- Bob Kustra
- Brian Lamb
- Mary Landrieu
- Jonathan Larkin
- Greg Lashutka
- Mike Lee
- Loren Leman
- Roger P. Lempke
- Delano Lewis
- Joseph Lieberman
- Rush Limbaugh
- Donal Logue
- Trent Lott
- Richard Lugar
- Ray Mabus
- Greil Marcus
- James G. Martin
- Craig Melvin
- Scott McCallum
- David McCormick
- Ryan McGee
- John R. McKernan Jr.
- M. Peter McPherson
- Craig Melvin
- Bob Menéndez
- Gray H. Miller
- Henson Moore
- Tim Moore
- Thomas J. Moyer
- Chris Murphy
- Scott Murphy
- Ben Nelson
- Al Neuharth
- Michael J. Newman
- Sam Nunn
- William A. O'Neill
- Mike Oxley
- Ajit Pai
- George Pataki
- Jane Pauley
- John Perez
- Tom Petri
- Thomas G. Plaskett
- Larry Pressler
- David Pryor
- Hans Pung
- Jim Ramstad
- Nancy Redd
- Harry Reid
- Ann Richards
- Joseph P. Riley Jr.
- Richard Riley
- Ron Rivera
- Buddy Roemer
- Patrick Rose
- Nick Saban
- James Santelle
- Ben Sasse
- Scott Scarborough
- Derek Schmidt
- Tim Scott
- Jonathan Shapiro
- James Shumway
- Brad Smith
- G. Murrell Smith Jr.
- Larry Smith
- Abigail Spencer
- Bruce Springsteen
- Katie Stam
- William A. Steiger
- Gene Stephenson
- Carole Keeton Strayhorn
- Josh Svaty
- James Thibault
- John Thune
- Daniel J. Travanti
- Donald L. Tucker
- David Valesky
- Gaddi Vasquez
- David Vitter
- Gy Waldron
- Scott Walker
- Summer Walker
- Brad Walsh
- Jon Waters
- Ron Walters
- Carl E. Walz
- Hines Ward
- Jerry West
- T. K. Wetherell
- Lari White
- Wayne W. Williams
- Bob Wise
- Drew Wrigley
- Kevin Patrick Yeary
- Ryan Zinke

== See also ==
- Hugh O'Brian Youth Leadership Foundation
- Missouri Boys State
- Mountaineer Boys State
- Model United Nations
- MSC Student Conference on National Affairs at Texas A&M University
- Virginia Boys State
- YMCA Youth & Government
