= James Thibault =

American politician

Member of the New Hampshire House of Representatives from the Merrimack 25th district
- Incumbent
- Assumed office December 4, 2024
- Preceded by: Jason Gerhard

Personal details
- Born: James Richard Thibault; December 27, 2005 (age 20) Laconia, New Hampshire, U.S.
- Party: Republican
- Education: Winnisquam Regional High School
- Alma mater: Saint Anselm College (enrolled)
- Website: Campaign website

James Richard Thibault (/ˈtiːboʊ/; TEE-boh; born December 27, 2005) is an American politician who currently serves as a member of the New Hampshire House of Representatives for the Republican Party. As of 2025, he is among the youngest state legislators in the United States.

== Early life and education ==
Thibault was born in 2005 in Laconia, New Hampshire. He has an older and a younger sister.

He graduated from Winnisquam Regional High School and currently attends Saint Anselm College.

== Political career ==
Thibault attended the American Legion's 2023 Boys Nation program, as well as the 62nd annual United States Senate Youth Program in 2024. He also previously served as youth co-chair of the New Hampshire Legislative Youth Advisory Council and as the political director for the High School Republican National Federation.

In September 2024, Thibault defeated Brandon Stevens in the Republican primary election for Merrimack County district 25 of the New Hampshire House of Representatives. In November 2024, he defeated Joyce Fulweiler in the general election, winning over 60 percent of the vote. He succeeded Jason Gerhard as representative. He is among the youngest state legislators in New Hampshire history, second only to Valerie McDonnell.

== Electoral history ==
2024 New Hampshire House of Representatives Merrimack 25 Republican Primary
| Party | Candidate | Votes | % |
|---|---|---|---|
| Republican | James Thibault | 682 | 52.6 |
| Republican | Brandon Stevens | 614 | 47.4 |
| Total votes | | 1,296 | 100.0 |

2024 New Hampshire House of Representatives General Election Merrimack 25
| Party | Candidate | Votes | % |
|---|---|---|---|
| Republican | James Thibault | 4,106 | 60.5 |
| Democratic | Joyce Fulweiler | 2,686 | 39.5 |
| Total votes | | 6,792 | 100.0 |

== See also ==
- List of the youngest state legislators in the United States
- Boys Nation
- Boys State and Girls State
- United States Senate Youth Program
- Youth council
