= Sons of The American Legion =

American nonprofit organization

- Emblem
- Abbreviation: SAL
- Named after: The American Legion
- Established: September 15, 1932 (94 years ago)
- Founded at: Portland, Oregon
- Type: Patriotic organization
- Legal status: Nonprofit corporation
- Headquarters: 700 N. Pennsylvania St., Indianapolis, Indiana
- Coordinates: 39.7770°N 86.1562°W
- Region served: Worldwide
- Members: 380,743 (2023)
- Official language: English
- National Commander: Thomas "Thom" Skelley
- National Adjutant: Anthony Wright
- Parent organization: The American Legion
- Affiliations: American Legion Auxiliary; American Legion Riders
- Website: legion.org/sons

The Sons of The American Legion (SAL) is a non-profit organization of male descendants of men or women who served honorably in the U.S. Armed Forces during World War I or since December 7, 1941, through a date of cessation of hostilities as determined by the federal government. Headquartered in Indianapolis, its mission is to serve U.S. veterans, the military and their families through outreach programs delivered by its squadrons, detachments, and national headquarters.

== Mission ==
Their main mission is to sponsor programs that its parent organization, The American Legion, does to improve veterans communities, such as scholarships, veterans help programs (i.e. ending veterans homelessness), and youth sports. They also promote national security, patriotism, and devotion to veterans.

== History ==
=== Beginnings ===
The establishment of the Sons of The American Legion as a non-political, no-sectarian civilian organization was authorized by the 14th National Convention of The American Legion on September 15, 1932, at Portland, Oregon.

In 1939, the S.A.L. was riding the crest and had a numerical size of about seven percent as large as the parent organization. The S.A.L. organization seemed destined to grow even larger, but looming on the horizon was World War II. With the passing of time, thousands of young men suddenly found themselves old enough to be in the armed services.

Many of the S.A.L. members never returned from World War II and those that did found that their service had made them eligible to join the ranks of the American Legion itself, which, in 1942 opened the door to the returning World War II veterans.

Membership dropped from a high of 72,633 in 1939 to a low of 5,631 in 1953. Many factors caused the lean years for the S.A.L. program. The former S.A.L., now veterans of World War II, had no grown children in the immediate postwar years. Housing shortages, a nation on the move, the G.I. Bill that sent thousands of veterans back to school, and the Korean War that put reservists back in uniform were some of the contributing factors.

=== 1960–present ===
However, by 1963, enrollment had climbed to nearly 17,000. In noting this renewed growth, the National Executive Committee, in regular meetings assembled in Indianapolis, Indiana, April 30 – May 1, 1964, [passed Resolution 22, urging that the S.A.L. program "be encouraged and implemented by internal promotion and increased public recognition through the national Headquarters staff and the various Departments of the American Legion." Approval was given for the S.A.L. to conduct their first National S.A.L. Workshop during the Legion's National Convention in Dallas, Texas in 1964.

In noting a need for a small national body to give the S.A.L. program national direction and stimulation, the Legion's NEC gave its approval to Resolution 60 at its May 8–9, 1969, meeting in St. Louis, Missouri. Resolution 60 created a four-member Sons of The American Legion Committee.

After conducting a long and detailed study of the over-all organizational structure of the S.A.L., the Sons of The American Legion Committee reported that there was a "definite need for a national Sons of The American Legion organization and the updating of the National Constitution and By-Laws of the S.A.L., as approved by the Legion's NEC back in May 1933, and be subsequently amended".

At its fall meeting in Indianapolis, IN, October 17–18, 1973, the Legion gave its approval to Resolution 15, abolishing the National S.A.L. Committee created by Resolution 60 by the Legion's NEC at its meeting May 8–9, 1969, in St. Louis, MO. Residual responsibilities of the National S.A.L. Committee are now assigned to the Legion's National Internal Affairs Commission.

Since 1988, The Sons have raised more than $8 million for the American Legion Child Welfare Foundation.

In early to mid 2014, mySAL was launched to Sons of The American Legion squadron adjutants can now access membership information, reports and electronic membership tools online.

As of 2016, the membership total is over 360,000.

== Programs ==
At the state level, the S.A.L. is organized into "detachments", which run annual civic training events for high school juniors called Boys State. Two members from each Boys State are selected for Boys Nation. The American Legion Auxiliary runs Girls State and Girls Nation. In addition to Boys State, the S.A.L., division of the American Legion, features numerous programs including American Legion Baseball, Scouting, Oratorical Contests, Junior Shooting Sports, Youth Alumni, the American Legion Riders, and Scholarships at every level of the organization.

== Membership eligibility requirements ==
All male descendants, adopted sons and stepsons of members of The American Legion, and such male descendants of veterans who died in service during World War I or since December 7, 1941, during the delimiting periods set forth in Article IV, Section 1, of the National Constitution of The American Legion or who died subsequent to their honorable discharge from such service, shall be eligible for membership in the Sons of The American Legion.

- Because eligibility dates remain open, all active duty members of the U.S. Armed Forces are eligible to join The American Legion at this time, until the date of the end of hostilities as determined by the government of the United States.
- U.S. Merchant Marine eligible only from December 7, 1941, to December 31, 1946 (WWII).

== Organizational structure ==
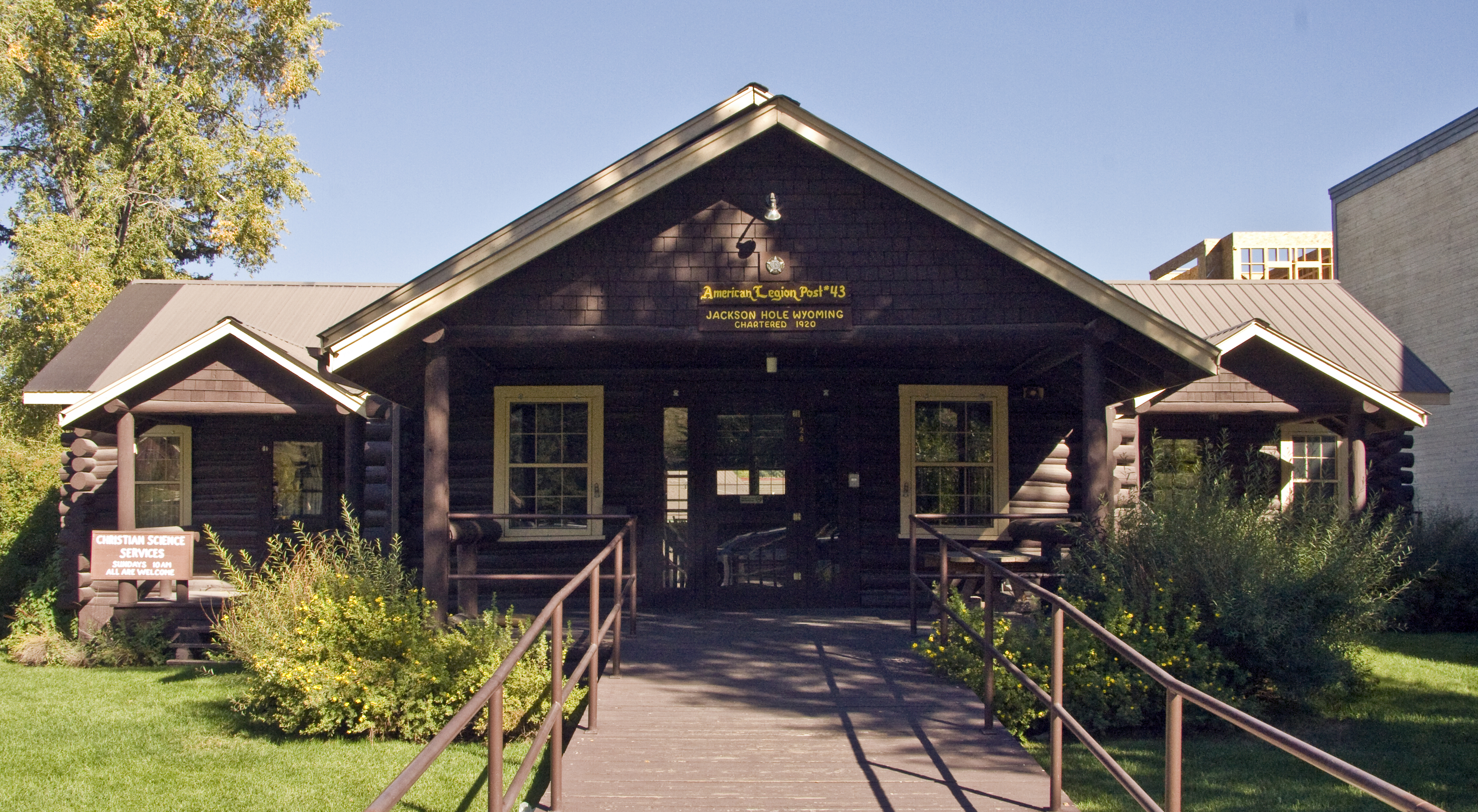
Jackson Legion Hall in Jackson, Wyoming

=== Squadron ===
The squadron is the basic unit of the Legion and usually represents a small geographic area such as a single town or part of a county. There are roughly 14,900 posts in the United States. The squadron is used for formal business such as meetings and a coordination point for community service projects. Often the squadron will host community events such as bingo, Hunter breakfasts, holiday celebrations, and available to the community, churches in time of need. It is also not uncommon for the Post to contain a bar open during limited hours. An S.A.L. squadron member is distinguished by a French blue garrison cap with red, white and blue piping.

=== Counties ===
Each U.S. county comprises several squadrons and oversees their operations, led by a County Council of elected officers. The County Commander performs annual inspections of the Posts within their jurisdiction and reports the findings to both the District and the Department level. An S.A.L. County member is distinguished by a French blue garrison cap with white piping.

=== Districts ===
Each squadron is divided into Divisions and/or Districts. Each District oversees several squadrons, generally about 20, to help each smaller group have a larger voice. Divisions are even larger groups of about four or more Districts. The main purpose of these "larger" groups (Districts—Divisions) is to allow one or two delegates to represent an area at conferences, conventions, and other gatherings, where large numbers of Legionnaires may not be able to attend. A District member is distinguished by a French blue garrison cap with a white crown and red, white and blue piping.

=== Detachments ===
The squadrons are grouped together into a state level organization known as a Detachment for the purposes of coordination and administration. There is a total of 55 Detachments; one for each of the 50 states, the District of Columbia, Puerto Rico, France, Mexico, and the Philippines. Canada was merged into Department of New York several years ago. The three Detachments located overseas are intended to allow active duty military stationed and veterans living overseas to be actively involved with The American Legion similar to as if they were back in the States. The Detachment of France consists of 29 Posts located in 10 European counties, the Detachment of Latin America consists of 22 Posts located in Central America, and the Detachment of Philippines covers Asia and the Pacific Islands. A Detachment member is distinguished by a French blue garrison cap with a gold crown and red, white and blue piping.

=== National headquarters ===
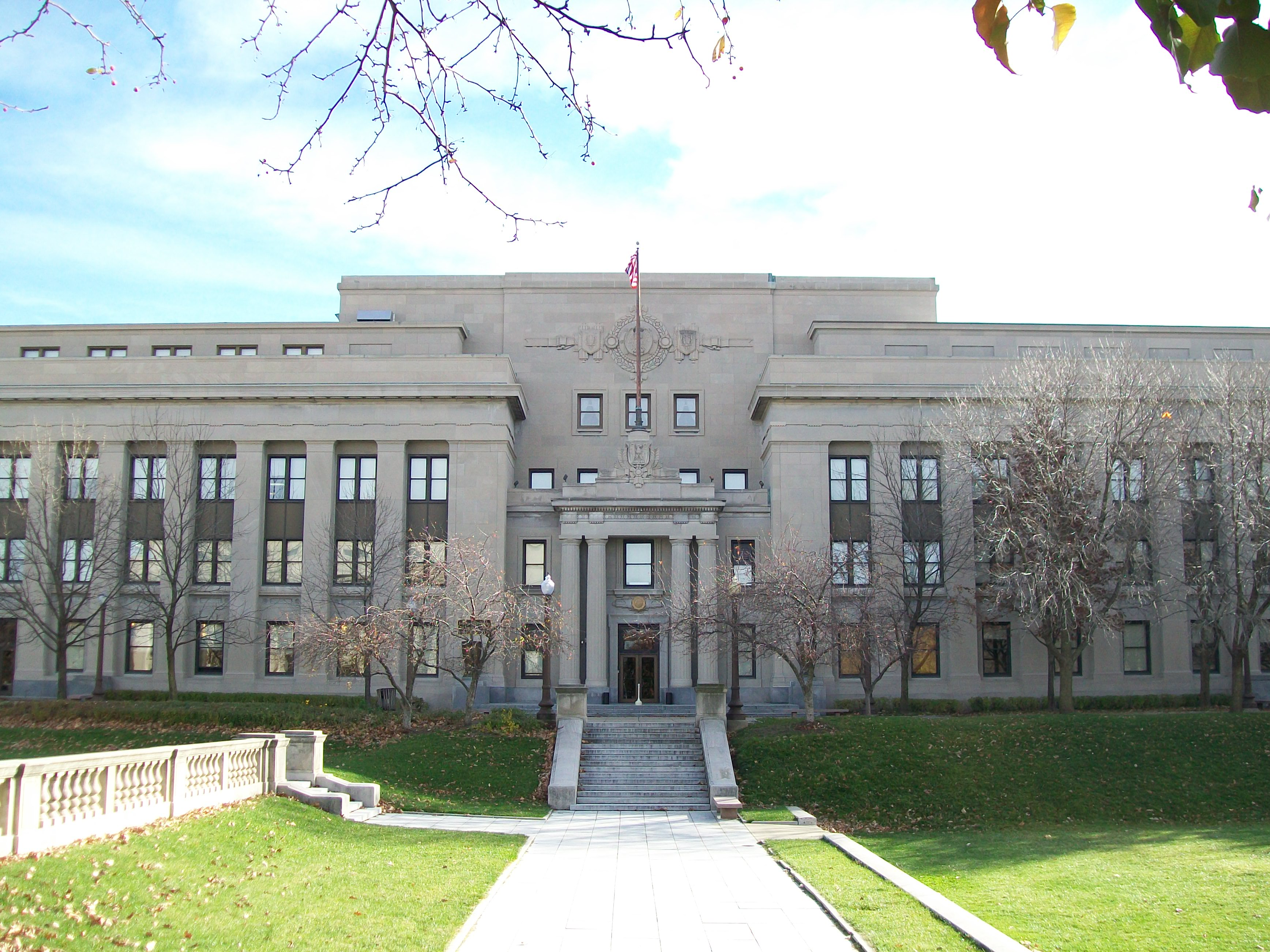
American Legion National Headquarters, Indianapolis

The main S.A.L. Headquarters is located on the Indiana World War Memorial Plaza in Indianapolis. It is the primary office for the National Commander and also houses the historical archives, library, Membership, Internal Affairs, Public Relations, and the Magazine editorial offices. The Legion also owns a building in Washington D.C. that contains many of the operation offices such as Economics, Legislative, Veterans Affairs, Foreign Relations, National Security, and Media Relations. A National member is distinguished by a gold garrison cap with a gold crown and red, white and blue piping.

== mySAL ==
National Headquarters developed the website to mimic myLegion, which assists a post, district, county, and state officers with their membership needs. Download an authorization form at mySAL to start the process of creating a squadron account. Once an account is created, you can login here: mySAL.Sons of The American Legion squadron adjutants can now access membership information, reports and electronic membership tools online. As of April 2015, Detachments now have access to the website which provides membership information, reports and electronic membership tools such as data change forms for all squadrons within their Detachment.

== Past S.A.L. Commanders ==
The following list is from the S.A.L. website:

=== 1968–1969 ===
Year	Name	State from	Notes
1968	Michael Seaton	CA	
1969	Robert McBride	OH	

=== 1970–1979 ===
Year	Name	State from	Notes
1970–71	J.R. Stillwell	IL	
1972	John Smolinsky	MA	
1973	Robert Faust	CA	
1974	James Hartman	MD	
1975	Gregory D. Reis	IL	
1976	Grant M. Jamieson	MI	
1977	Charles E. Gannon	MD	
1978	John M. Sherrard	CA	
1979	Richard J. Kepler	AZ	Deceased

=== 1980–1989 ===
Year	Name	State from	Notes
1980	Ernest Wilson Jr.	NJ	Deceased
1981	Donald L. Willson	PA	Deceased
1982	David P. Stephens	IN	
1983	Christopher R. Cerullo	NY	
1984	Fred L. Hartline	OH	
1985	Woodrow L. Mudge Jr.	CO	Deceased
1986	Royce Doucet	LA	Deceased
1987	Douglas P. Bible	MN	
1988	Richard L. League	MD	
1989	David R. Faust	WI	

=== 1990–1999 ===
Year	Name	State from	Notes
1990	Charles R. Belles	VA	
1991	Robert A. Worrel	IN	
1992	Eugene L. Sacco	CA	
1993	Charles B. Rigsby	MI	Deceased
1994	Roland D. Matteson	AZ	
1995	Joseph M. Mayne	MN	
1996	John T. Dietz	KY	Deceased
1997	Jack E. Jordan	TX	
1998	William E. Matoska	MD	
1999	Byron Robichaux	LA	

=== 2000–2020 ===
Year	Name	State from	Notes
2000	Richard L. Cook	OK	
2001	Kevin N. Winkelmann	TX	
2002	Clifford A. Smith	MA	
2003	Steve C. Laws	NC	
2004	Neal C. Warnken	KS	
2005	Michael J. Deacon	IA	
2006	William L. Sparwasser	MD	
2007	Earl R. Ruttkofsky	MI	
2008	Raymond P. Giehll Jr.	IN	
2009	Patrick J. Shea	OH	Honorary; Deceased
2009	Thomas E. Cisna	IL	
2010	Mark E. Arneson	GA	
2011	David L. Dew	TX	
2012	James K. Roberts III	FL	
2013	Christopher J. Huntzinger	PA	
2014	Joseph W. Gladden	MD	
2015	Mike W. Moss	CO	
2016	Kevin L. Collier	AK	
2017	Jeff Frain	AZ	
2018	Danny Smith	NE	
2019	Greg "Doc" Gibbs	NY	
2020	Clint D. Bolt	VA	

=== 2021–2030 ===
Year	Name	State from	Notes
2021	Clint D. Bolt	VA	
2022	Joseph Paviglianti	NY	National Commander by vote of National Convention body
2022	Micheal Fox	CA	
2023	Christopher Carlton	IN	
2024	Donald JR Hall	MD	
2025	Joseph Navarrete	NM	
2026	William Clancy III	NY	

== See also ==
- List of hereditary and lineage organizations
- Youth organizations in the United States
