= Virginia Boys State =

Youth organizations based in Virginia

- Abbreviation: VBS
- Formation: 1939
- Type: Not-For-Profit Corporation
- Legal status: Active
- Location: Hampden-Sydney College
- Region served: Virginia
- Services: "To promote leadership, citizenship and the value of the individual voice and vote."
- Official language: English
- Director: Linden Dixon
- Parent organization: American Legion
- Affiliations: American Legion Department of Virginia
- Website: http://www.vaboysstate.org

Virginia Boys State, formerly Old Dominion Boys State, is a 7-day youth program held each June to teach Virginia high school juniors leadership and the workings of government. Virginia is one of forty-nine US states (all except Hawaii) with such a program for boys and a separate program for girls sponsored by The American Legion Auxiliary. The Virginia Boys State program hosts approximately 500 students, or citizens, for seven days on the Hampden–Sydney College campus. During the week, the citizens of VBS create a self functioning mock government modeled after the State of Virginia.

== History ==
The first Boys State was held in Illinois in 1934 by Dr. Hays Kennedy and Harold Card, both educators and members of the Illinois American Legion. The Boys State program was designed to promote democracy, and counteract the fascist principles taught to the youth in Germany.

The American Legion Department of Virginia conducted its first Boys State in 1939 in Blacksburg, at the campus of Virginia Polytechnic Institute. It was at the time called Old Dominion Boys State, changing its name to Virginia Boys State in 1956. As of 2026, there have been 83 sessions held. One has been conducted every year with the exception of 1942-1945 due to World War II, and 2019 due to the COVID-19 pandemic. It has been hosted by the College of William and Mary, University of Lynchburg, Radford University, and, most recently, Hampden-Sydney College.

== Program ==
The program is made to teach students about their rights and responsibilities and to give hands-on experience working in a mock government. High school juniors are sponsored by their local American Legion post to attend, and expenses are paid for by the post or a local organization.

VBS citizens are assigned to one of sixteen cities named after American military leaders and founding fathers. They are also assigned to one of two political parties, the Federalists and the Nationalists. Citizens run for city and state office. Some citywide positions that each city elects include chaplain, city councilman, sheriff, and mayor. There is a general assembly, with each city electing multiple delegates and senators. There is a State Supreme Court selected by the general assembly. The highest positions are the state attorney general, lieutenant governor, and governor.

VBS citizens may participate in activities such as sports, band, chorus, and moot court. Numerous guest speakers come every year, often including the Governor of Virginia. Interviews are conducted to select two citizens to attend Boys Nation, which is held in Arlington.

== Notable alumni ==
- Glen E. Conrad, former United States District Court judge
- Carroll Dale, former NFL wide receiver and College Football Hall of Fame member
- Jerry Falwell, televangelist
- Linwood Holton, former Governor of Virginia
- Angus King, United States Senator
- Lewis F. Payne Jr., former United States Representative
- Richard H. Poff, former Virginia Supreme Court Justice

== Cities ==
- Bradley
- Burke
- Eisenhower
- Gravely
- Henrey
- James
- Jefferson
- MacArthur
- Madison
- Marshall
- Monroe
- Nimitz
- Patton
- Pershing
- Puller
- Washington
