= Matthew J. Wilson =

American lawyer

Dean and President of Temple University, Japan
- Incumbent
- Assumed office September 2020

5th President of Missouri Western State University
- In office July 1, 2019 – July 31, 2020
- Preceded by: Robert Vartabedian
- Succeeded by: Elizabeth Kennedy

16th President of the University of Akron
- In office July 1, 2016 – July 31, 2018; Acting: July 1, 2016 – October 19, 2016
- Preceded by: Scott Scarborough
- Succeeded by: John C. Green (acting)

Personal details
- Born: Matthew J. Wilson
- Spouse: Noriko
- Children: 3 sons and 1 daughter
- Education: University of Utah (BA/BS); Temple University (JD)
- Profession: Professor

Matthew J. Wilson is an American academic who has served as the president and dean of Temple University, Japan Campus since 2020. Between 2003–09, Wilson served as senior associate dean, general counsel, and law professor at Temple's Japan campus.

Wilson served as the fifth president of Missouri Western State University from July 2019 to August 2020. Prior to being at Missouri Western, Wilson served as president of the University of Akron from 2016 to 2018, serving as dean of its law school before that.

Wilson earned a bachelor's degree in Asian studies and political science with a minor in Japanese from the University of Utah. He earned his J.D. degree from Temple University.

Prior to his start in academia, Wilson practiced law in Florida. He also for a time practiced law in New Jersey.

From 2009 to 2014 Wilson was a professor of law at the University of Wyoming. He also served as associate dean of student affairs and associate dean of academic affairs in the law school there.

From 2014 to 2016 Wilson served as dean of the University of Akron college of law.

Wilson began the process to bring back baseball as an inter-collegiate sport at the University of Akron, as well as academic approaches to esports and a varsity esports program.

Wilson was named the fifth president of Missouri Western State University in March 2019.
