= Natalie Wells =

American politician

Member of New Hampshire House of Representatives for Merrimack 25
- In office December 2, 2020 – December 7, 2022
- Preceded by: David Karrick
- Succeeded by: Jason Gerhard
- In office 2016–2018
- Preceded by: David Karrick
- Succeeded by: David Karrick

Personal details
- Party: Republican

Natalie J. Wells is an American politician. She was a member of the New Hampshire House of Representatives and represented Merrimack's 25th district. The district contains the towns of Andover, Danbury, Salisbury, Warner and Webster.
