= Temple University, Japan Campus =

Japan campus of Temple University

Coordinates: 35°38′54.65″N 139°44′10.44″E

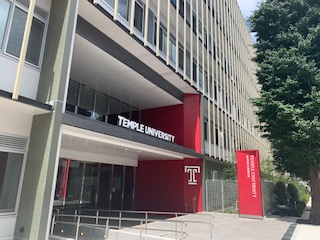
- Setagaya-ku, Tokyo Campus
- Established: 1982
- Dean and Campus President: Matthew J. Wilson

Degree Programs
- Undergraduate Programs: 3,319 students
- Master in Management: 33 students
- Beasley School of Law: 65 students
- Graduate College of Education: 112 students
- Master of Science in Communication Management: 9 students
- Total Degree Program Students: 3,538 students

Non-degree Programs
- Academic English Program: 1205 students
- Continuing Education: 398 students
- Corporate Education: 365 participants
- English Training Program for educational organizations: 160 participants
- Total Non-Degree Seeking Students: 2,155
- Faculty: 320
- Staff: 172
- Locations: Setagaya-ku, Tokyo and Fushimi-ku, Kyoto
- Abbreviation: TUJ

Website
- English: www.tuj.ac.jp/index.html
- Japanese: www.tuj.ac.jp/jp/index.html

Temple University, Japan Campus (TUJ) (Japanese: テンプル大学ジャパンキャンパス) is an international campus of Temple University (located in Philadelphia, Pennsylvania, United States). TUJ is located in Setagaya-ku, Tokyo and Fushimi-ku, Kyoto, Japan. It is the oldest and largest foreign university in Japan, with 3,319 undergraduate students, of which approximately 23% are from Japan.

The university offers degree programs, including an AA, BA, MSEd, in TESOL, PhD in Applied Linguistics, Master in Management (MiM), and LLM, and offers semester and year-long study abroad programs for U.S. undergraduate and law students. In addition, TUJ offers non-degree programs including the Academic English Program (AEP), Continuing Education, and Corporate Education. As of 2025, TUJ enrolled 3,538 degree program students: 3,319 undergraduates and 230 graduate students. Non-degree enrollment totals more than 2,155, including 1,205 Academic English Program students and more than 750 Continuing Education & Corporate Education students. Additionally, TUJ offers English training programs for educational organizations with an annual participation rate of roughly 160.

== History ==
Temple University, Japan Campus (TUJ) was established in 1982 in Shiba-Koen, Minato-ku, as the first campus of an American university in Japan, originally operating with a series of business partners. In 1996, TUJ became a wholly owned, subsidized operation of Temple Main Campus in Philadelphia. At this time, TUJ was relocated to Minami-Azabu, Minato-ku, where it operated until it formally opened its new campus in Setagaya-ku, Tokyo, in August, 2019.

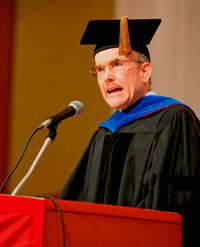
James Zumwalt, Chargé d'affaires, giving a speech at the June 2009 Graduation Ceremony.

At its inception, the university offered an Intensive English Language Program (IELP) at its Tokyo campus, as well as a Master of Education (M.Ed.) program at both its Tokyo and Osaka centers. Within the next decade it launched an undergraduate program, a Doctor of Education (EdD) in TESOL program and a Master of Laws (LLM) program, as well as expanded its IELP program to its Osaka center. In 1996, TUJ launched the Executive MBA program – the first program of its kind in Japan (the program ended in 2020) – while simultaneously re-launching its Open College Program as Continuing Education and its Globalization Program as Corporate Education.

In 2005 the Japanese Ministry of Education, Culture, Sports, Science and Technology (MEXT) designated Temple University, Japan Campus as a Japanese campus of a foreign university (外国大学日本校), which has improved its recognition within the national education system.

== Campuses ==
Temple University Japan Campus has campuses in Tokyo and Kyoto. In August 2026, TUJ is slated to open a second major 8-story complex in the Tokyo metropolitan area near Mizonokuchi station. https://www.tuj.ac.jp/announcement/hillside-center

=== Setagaya, Tokyo ===
In Tokyo, TUJ operates facilities at Showa Women's University's campus in Setagaya-ku. TUJ formally opened the Setagaya campus on August 14, 2019. TUJ Tokyo has six computer labs equipped with Windows and Mac computers, a library with over 54,000 books, a career development office, counseling, and media room.

=== Kyoto ===
Temple University has announced a Kyoto campus in Fushimi ward opening in January 2025 with a commencement in Spring.

=== Osaka ===
The Osaka location was in Umeda, Kita-ku and houses the Graduate College of Education, closed in 2024. The Graduate College of Education transitioned to a fully online and/or Tokyo-based format beginning in the Fall 2024 semester.

== Institute of Contemporary Asian Studies (ICAS) ==
Established in 2004, ICAS (formerly the Institute of Contemporary Japanese Studies) is an institute run by TUJ providing a platform for scholars to present studies and facilitate academic discussion. It hosts about 35 lectures and symposiums each year, all open to the public and usually free of charge. Lecture topics – focusing on contemporary Asia as well as American-related affairs – range from politics, the economy, foreign and military affairs, cinema and pop culture, to healthcare systems and environmental issues. Participants include a wide range of individuals from the foreign and Japanese media, business, government and academic communities.

== Student life ==
=== Students ===
Students attending TUJ come from approximately 67 countries around the world. In addition to Japan and the United States, TUJ has students from East and Southeast Asia, Russia, the Middle East, Africa, Latin America, and Europe.

=== Clubs and organizations ===
As of July 2024, 25 student organizations and a Veteran Association have been active. They are overseen by the Office of Student Services and Engagement.

=== Setagaya City Collaboration ===
The school has been developing relations with the Setagaya City. In December 2022, both parties formally agreed to deepen collaboration on projects that promote cross-cultural communication and international understanding.

The school has been involved in a series of academic programs and cross-cultural events with residents and students on a regular basis. The university offers summer English language programs to elementary and middle school students. The university also permits Setagaya residents to access its library.
