= J. Thomas Hill =

American businessman (born 1959)

- Born: c. 1959
- Education: University of Pittsburgh
- Occupation: Businessman
- Known for: CEO of Vulcan Materials Company

James Thomas Hill (born c. 1959) is an American businessman. He is the chief executive officer of Vulcan Materials Company.

== Early life ==
Hill was born circa 1959. He graduated from the University of Pittsburgh.

== Career ==
Hill worked for the Vulcan Materials Company from 1979 to 1990, and Redlands Stone Products from 1990 to 1996. He returned to Vulcan Materials in 1996. He succeeded Donald M. James as its chief executive officer and president in July 2014.

Hill serves on the board of directors of the U.S. Chamber of Commerce.
