= Ryan Smith (New Hampshire politician) =

American politician

Joyce Fulweiler

Member of New Hampshire House of Representatives for Merrimack 3
- In office 2016–2018
- Succeeded by: Joyce Fulweiler

Personal details
- Party: Republican

Ryan D. Smith is an American politician. He was a member of the New Hampshire House of Representatives.
