= Jason Gerhard =

American politician

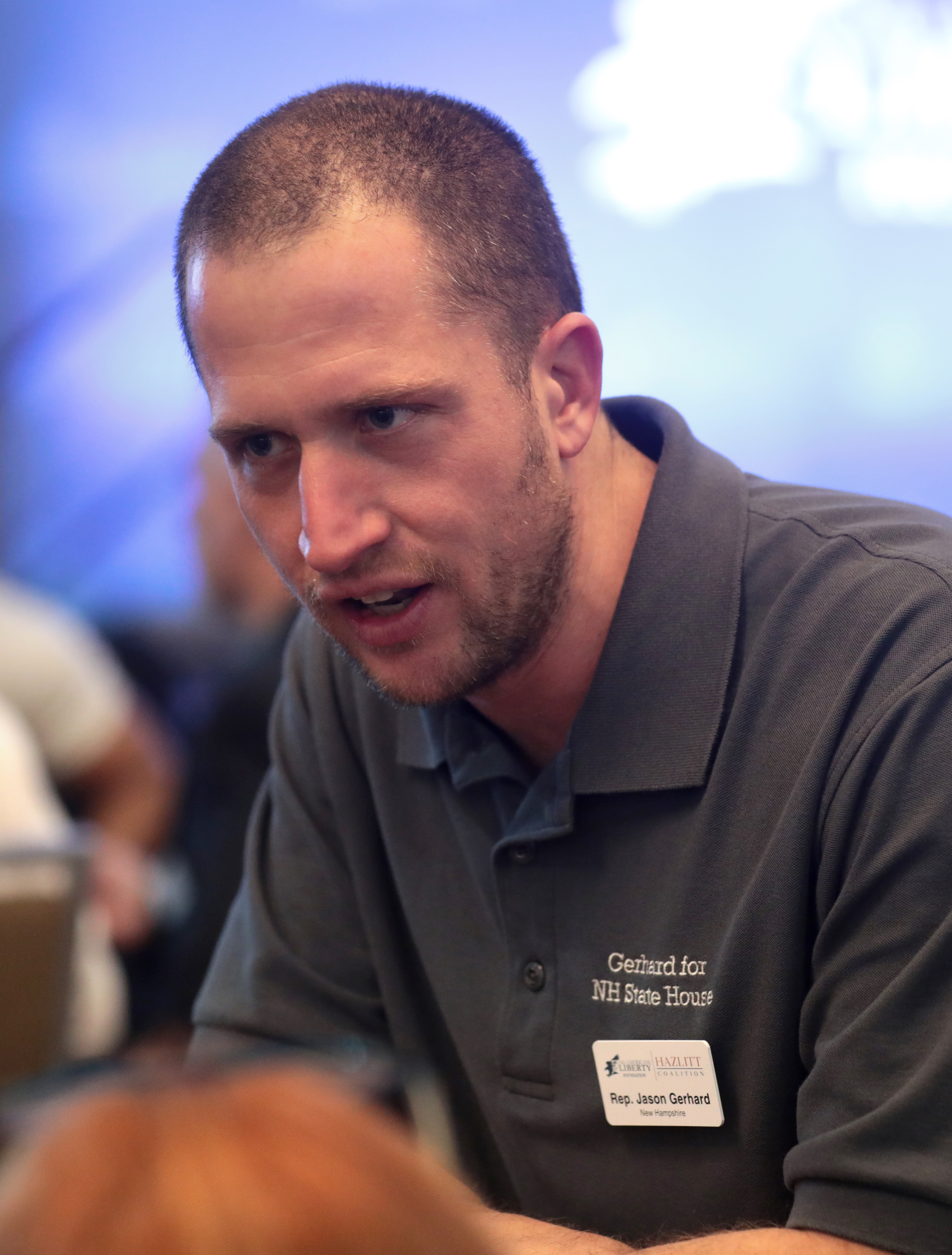

Member of the New Hampshire House of Representatives from the Merrimack 25th district
- In office December 7, 2022 – December 3, 2024
- Preceded by: Natalie Wells
- Succeeded by: James Thibault

Personal details
- Born: Long Island, New York, U.S.
- Party: Republican

Jason Gerhard is an American politician. He served as a Republican member for the Merrimack 25th district of the New Hampshire House of Representatives.

== Life and career ==
Gerhard was born in Long Island, New York.

On June 8, 2009, Gerhard purchased 6,000 rounds of ammunition. The next day, Gerhard bought necessary ingredients for manufacturing pipe bombs. The pipe bombs consisted of cylinders of pipe filled with explosive powder, with space for a fuse to be inserted; twenty-one pipe bombs were found. On July 30, 2010, Gerhard was sentenced to 240 months' imprisonment, five years of supervised release, and a $400 special assessment.

In September 2022, Gerhard defeated Kenna Cross in the Republican primary election for the Merrimack 25th district of the New Hampshire House of Representatives, comprising the city of Franklin and the town of Northfield. In November 2022, he defeated Deborah Wheeler in the general election, winning 55 percent of the votes. He assumed office in December 2022.

Gerhard ran for Merrimack County Sheriff in 2024 but lost in the Republican primary to Frank Cassidy. His term in the New Hampshire House of Representatives ended in December 2024.
