= Kenna Cross =

American politician

Member of New Hampshire House of Representatives for Merrimack 3
- In office December 2, 2020 – December 7, 2022
- Preceded by: Joyce Fulweiler

Personal details
- Party: Republican

Kenna Cross is an American politician. She was elected a member of the New Hampshire House of Representatives in the 2020 election.
