= Donald M. James =

American lawyer and businessman (born 1949)

- Born: January 20, 1949 (age 76); Russellville, Alabama, U.S.
- Education: University of Alabama; University of Virginia School of Law
- Occupation(s): Lawyer, businessman
- Known for: CEO of Vulcan Materials Company (1997-2014)
- Spouse: Anna
- Children: 3
- Parent(s): Clarence W. James; Grace Massey

Donald M. James (born January 20, 1949) is an American lawyer and businessman. He served as the chief executive officer of Vulcan Materials Company from 1997 to 2014.

== Early life ==
James was born on January 20, 1949, in Russellville, Alabama. He graduated from the University of Alabama, where he earned a bachelor's degree in 1971, followed by a master in business administration in 1973. He earned a JD from the University of Virginia School of Law in 1977.

== Career ==
James began his career as a lawyer, and he became a partner at Bradley, Arant, Rose & White in Birmingham, Alabama.

James began working at Vulcan Material Company in 1992, and he served as its president from 1996 to 1997. He was its chief executive officer from 1997 to 2014, when he was succeeded by J. Thomas Hill.

James served on the boards of Protective Life, SouthTrust and Wachovia. He has served on the board of Wells Fargo since 2009.

James was inducted into the Alabama Academy of Honor in 2009.

== Personal life ==
James has a wife, Anna, daughter Virginia Grace Cohen and two others, and seven grandchildren, including Henry Sims Cohen.
