= United States Senate Youth Program =

American scholarship competition

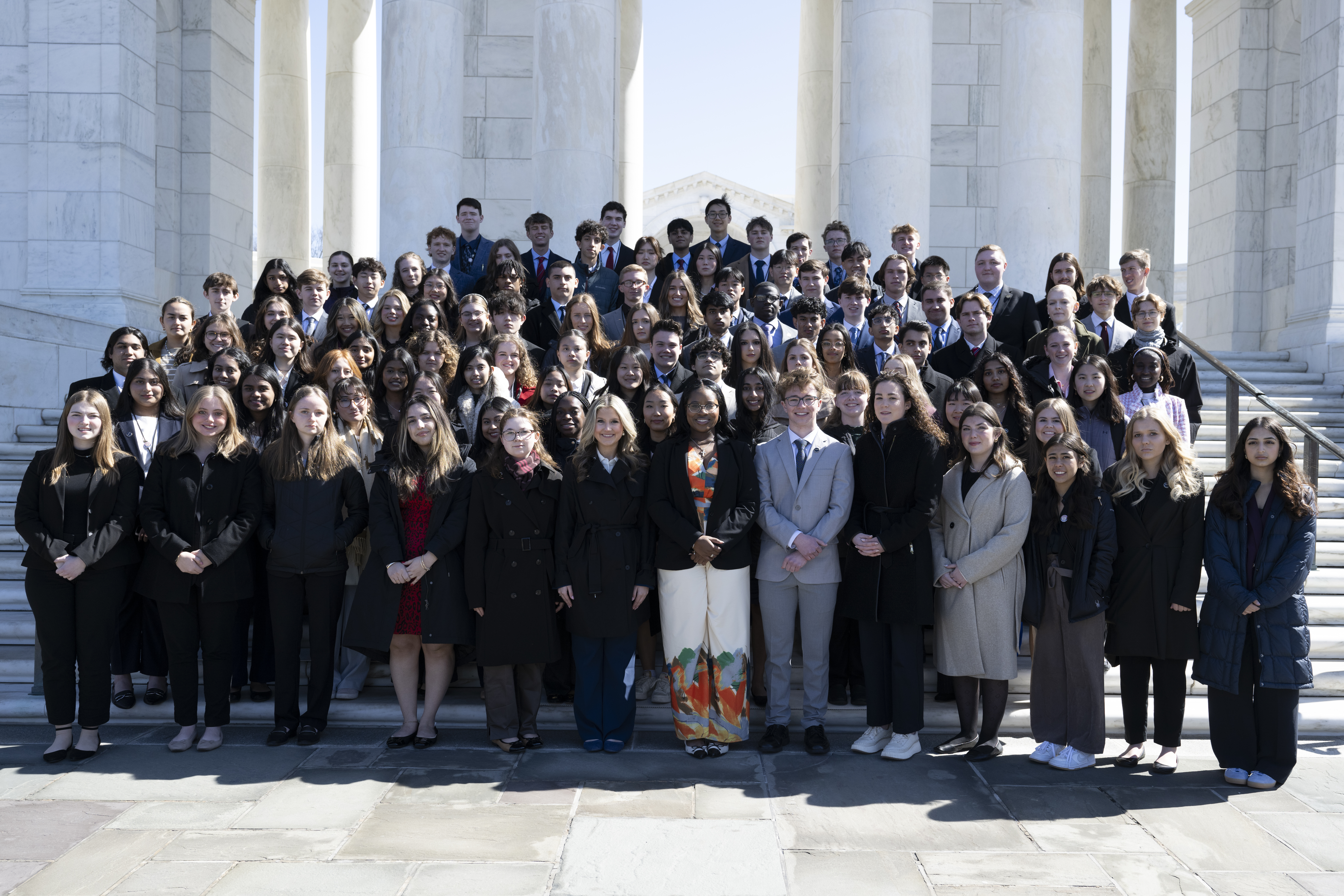
Students from the United States Senate Youth Program visit Arlington National Cemetery on March 7, 2025

The United States Senate Youth Program (USSYP) is an annual scholarship competition sponsored jointly by the U.S. Senate and the William Randolph Hearst Foundation.

After a testing and interview process, two high school students are selected from each state, the District of Columbia, and the Department of Defense's overseas educational activities. In addition to a $10,000 scholarship, each receives a week-long trip to Washington, D.C.

== History ==
External videos
- 27th Annual U.S. Senate Youth Program, February 3, 1989, C-SPAN
- Speech to the Senate Youth Program by USSR Deputy Ambassador to the U.S. Sergey Chetverikov, February 5, 1992, C-SPAN
- Speech to the Senate Youth Program by Russian Ambassador to the U.S. Vladimir Lukin, February 4, 1993, C-SPAN
- Interview with Sen. Susan Collins (R-ME) on her experiences as part of the Senate Youth Program, March 6, 2012, C-SPAN
- Q&A interview with Senate Youth Program participants, March 9, 2012, C-SPAN
- Q&A interview with Brian Kamoie, discussing his presentation to the Senate Youth Program, May 8, 2012, C-SPAN
- Q&A interview with Senate Youth Program participants, March 15, 2013, C-SPAN
- Q&A interview with Senate Youth Program participants, March 14, 2014, C-SPAN
- Q&A interview with Senate Youth Program participants, March 13, 2015, C-SPAN
- Q&A interview with Senate Youth Program participants, March 11, 2016, C-SPAN
- Q&A interview with Senate Youth Program participants, March 10, 2017, C-SPAN
- Q&A interview with Senate Youth Program participants, March 2018, C-SPAN
- Q&A interview with Senate Youth Program participants, April 1, 2018
- Q&A interview with Senate Youth Program participants, April 21, 2019, C-SPAN

In 1962, senators Everett Dirksen, Hubert Humphrey, Tom Kuchel, and Mike Mansfield introduced S.R. 324 to the Senate floor, which created the program. The resolution was passed on May 17, 1962 and signed into law by John F. Kennedy. In 1981, the resolution was amended to provide for the participation of the Department of Defense Education Activity. The Hearst Foundation has provided funding for the program since its inception.

== Organization and administration ==
The United States Senate Youth Program (USSYP) is fully funded by the Hearst Foundation with the aim of discovering, equipping, and inspiring the next generation of local, state, and national leaders.

All student delegates to the United States Senate Youth Program are selected by state-level education officials – the United States Senate and The Hearst Foundations do not provide individual states’ applications or choose the delegates and alternates. Student delegates are usually selected by their State Department of Education through rigorous application processes.

== Washington Week ==
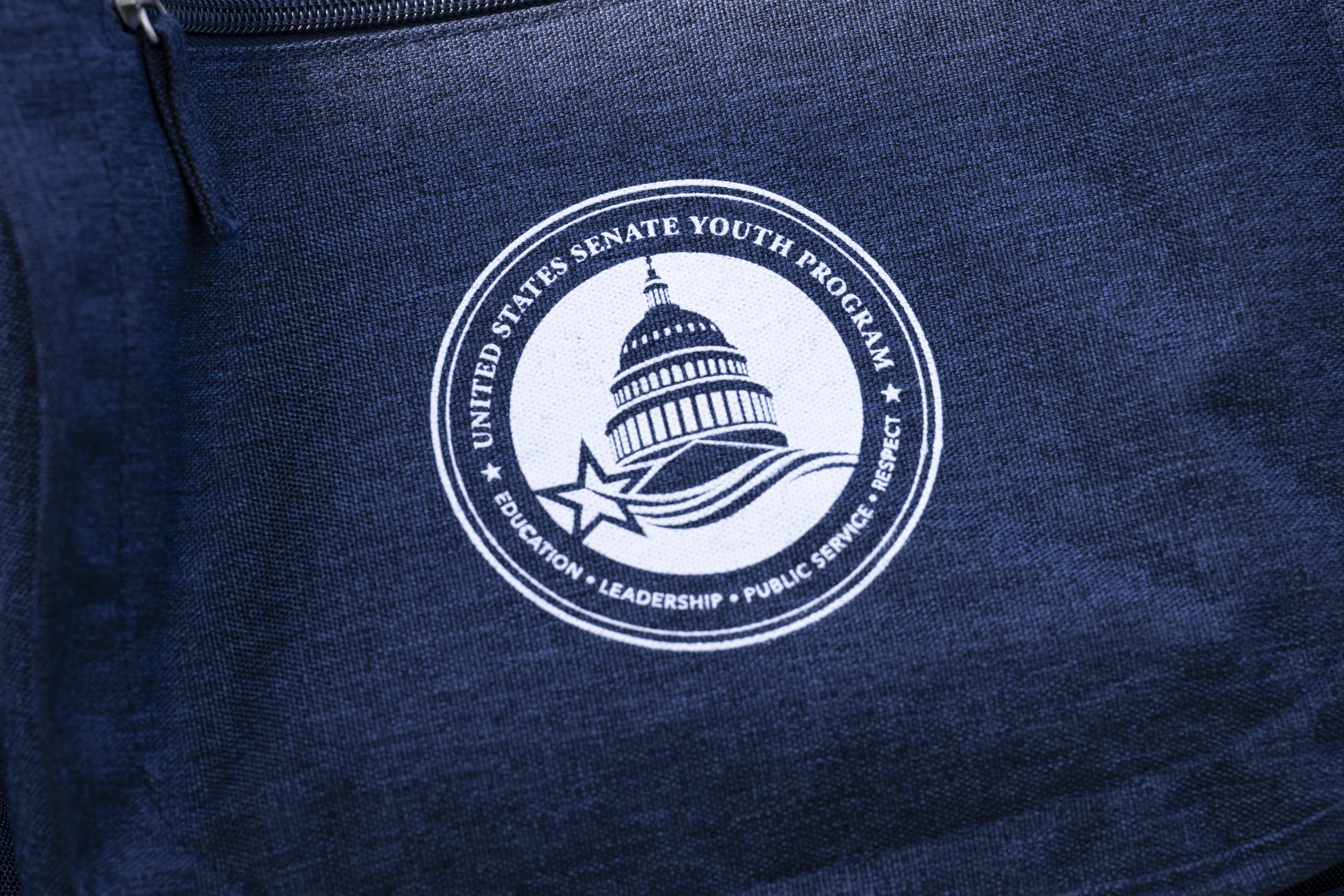
United States Senate Youth Program logo.

Selected student delegates receive a week-long trip to Washington, D.C. Each year, this trip, which is referred to as "Washington Week," provides an intensive study of government for the 104 students in each year's national delegation. While there, delegates attend meetings and briefings with senators, members of the House of Representatives, Congressional staff, the president, a justice of the Supreme Court, leaders of cabinet agencies, an ambassador to the United States, and members of the media.

At the conclusion of Washington Week, student delegates in attendance receive a $10,000 undergraduate college scholarship.

== Notable alumni ==
The following are alumni of the Senate Youth Program:

- Richard Burt, former United States Ambassador to Germany and chief negotiator of the Strategic Arms Reduction Treaty
- Pete Buttigieg, former mayor of South Bend, Indiana, 2020 Democratic presidential candidate and Secretary of Transportation.
- Chris Christie, former governor of New Jersey
- Susan Collins, U.S. Senator from Maine
- Cory Gardner, former U.S. Senator from Colorado
- Wayne Goodwin, chair of the North Carolina Democratic Party
- Jaime Harrison, Chair of the Democratic National Committee
- Robert Henry, former federal judge
- David H. Leroy, former lieutenant governor of Idaho
- Lee Isaac Chung, film director
- Mack McLarty, former White House Chief of Staff
- Karl Rove, former Senior Advisor to the President
- James Thibault, State Representative from New Hampshire
- Brandon Prichard, State Representative from North Dakota
- Dennis Ruprecht, State Representative from New Hampshire (2018-2021)
