= U.S. Concrete =

American company

U.S. Concrete, Inc
- Industry: Heavy building materials
- Founded: 1999
- Headquarters: Euless, Texas, United States
- Key people: Ronnie Pruitt ( President and CEO), John E. Kunz ( Senior Vice-President and CFO), Paul M. Jolas (Senior Vice-President, General Counsel & Corporate Secretary)
- Products: Aggregates and Ready-Mixed Concrete
- Website: www.us-concrete.com

U.S. Concrete, Inc. is an American company specializing in concrete and heavy construction aggregates. It was founded in 1999 and is headquartered in Euless, Texas, United States. The company’s main products are ready-mix concrete and aggregates. The company serves customers widely distributed in Texas, California, New Jersey, New York, Oklahoma, Philadelphia, U.S. Virgin Islands and Washington D.C.

== History ==
From 1999-2001, U.S. Concrete acquired 21 companies and received $35 million in an IPO. From 2002-2003, the company engaged in the aggregates industry and completed 1 tuck-in acquisition. From 2004 onward, it has been engaged in more cross-selling opportunities.

The company filed for Chapter 11 bankruptcy protection on April 29, 2010. It emerged from bankruptcy on August 31, 2010 after reducing its debt by $272 million.

On October 30, 2012, Central Concrete Supply Co., Inc., a wholly owned subsidiary of U.S. Concrete, completed the acquisition of Bode Gravel Co. and Bode Concrete LLC.

On Dec 17, 2012, a wholly owned subsidiary of U.S. Concrete, Smith Precast, Inc., sold substantially all of its assets for $4.27 million in cash and the assumption of certain obligations by Jensen Enterprises, Inc.

In 2015, U.S. Concrete completed a significant ready-mixed concrete acquisition of Ferrara Bros. Building Materials, in Queens, New York. This acquisition significantly expanded the Company's footprint in New York City and allowed them to serve all five boroughs. In subsequent acquisitions in 2016, USCR completed a series of acquisitions of Jenna Concrete, NYCON Supply Co. and Kings Ready Mix as part of a strategy to strengthen and expand its New York City operations. These acquisitions expanded their ready-mixed concrete operations, adding New York as a major contributor to success.

In 2017, the company completed its largest acquisition to date with the purchase of Polaris Materials, a construction aggregate producer in British Columbia, Canada. Beyond its own traditional regions, they also serve aggregates-only markets in Southern California and Hawaii. Also in 2017, USCR acquired Corbett Aggregate Companies, LLC located in Quinton, New Jersey.

In 2020, U.S. Concrete expanded its aggregates portfolio with the acquisition of Coram Materials, a construction aggregate producer on Long Island, New York.

In June 2021, Vulcan Materials (VMC) announced they would be acquiring U.S. Concrete (USCR) for $74 per share, a 30% premium on the date of the announcement. The deal is valued at $1.3 billion. The acquisition will allow for the integrated expansion of Vulcan and make the subsidiary debt-free with adequate working capital. The deal has been approved by both boards and will close in the second half of 2021.

== Products and services ==
U.S. Concrete, Inc. provides ready-mixed concrete, the company also provides crushed stone, sand, and gravel. U.S. Concrete has 176 standard ready-mixed concrete plants, 15 volumetric ready-mixed concrete facilities, and 22 producing aggregates facilities (2019). The company also involves building materials stores, hauling operations and broker product sales.

== Operations ==
=== Research and development ===
2009, U.S. Concrete's National Research Laboratory was set up to develop supplementary cementitious materials (SCMs) for enhanced concrete. The company also maintains academic-industrial partnership with research teams at the University of California, Los Angeles (UCLA) and Arizona State University (ASU).

U.S. Concrete uses lime slurry and ARIDUS® rapid-drying concrete (addressing moisture-related floor covering failures) self-desiccating concrete technology. However, in December 2012, the company's subsidiary sold Arizona Precast Operations.
