= Theresa Amato =

American activist

Theresa Amato (born March 1, 1964) is an American public advocate and political activist. Founder and first president of the Citizen Advocacy Center (Elmhurst, Illinois) which builds democracy for the 21st century. Amato served as first executive director of the Citizen Works,an organization devoted to rebalancing the power between corporations and citizens. She was also the Director of its Fair Contracts Project. Amato is the principal of Amato PLLC, through which she advises nonprofits, foundations, and progressive candidates seeking office. Amato formerly served on the Council of Regents of Loyola University, Chicago, and continues to serve on the Advisory Board of the Loyola University, Chicago School of Law's Institute for Consumer Antitrust Studies.

== Early career ==
Born March 1, 1964, Amato began her legal career as a law clerk for The Honorable Robert W. Sweet (Southern District of New York-Manhattan) and then became a staff attorney at Public Citizen Litigation Group in Washington, D.C. She litigated high-profile cases and was the director of the Freedom of Information Clearinghouse. Amato has also served as the executive director of the Oak Park-River Forest Community Foundation, worked in private practice, and was of counsel to the firm Despres, Schwartz & Geoghegan. Amato is licensed to practice law in Illinois, New York and Washington, D.C. and has experience litigating and supervising the litigation of lawsuits at all levels of state and federal courts, testifying in front of public bodies, conducting corporate transactional work in the areas of banking, trusts, and securities, philanthropic fundraising and grantmaking, and navigating regulatory agencies.

In both 2000 and 2004, Amato served as the national presidential campaign manager and in-house counsel for Ralph Nader, who obtained the highest vote count in the United States for a third-party progressive candidate since 1924, and shepherded election reform efforts and litigation to open up the political system to competition. She also appears in the Sundance-selected and Academy Awards short-listed documentary about Ralph Nader, "An Unreasonable Man".

== Book ==
In 2009, the New Press (New York) published Amato's book, "Grand Illusion, The Myth of Voter Choice in a Two-Party Tyranny", which advocates for drastic electoral reforms. Amato's knowledge of election law was termed by 'Publishers Weekly' as "encyclopedic," and the publisher of 'Ballot Access News' called it "the best book ever written on ballot access".

In 1997, Amato was named by The American Lawyer as one of the "future leaders of the legal profession" and one of the country's "45 young lawyers (under 45) whose vision and commitment are changing lives."

She was named in 1998 by Harvard Law School as a Wasserstein Public Interest Law Fellow. In 1999 and 2000, respectively, Amato received both the NYU Law and Loyola Law Chicago Public Service Awards.

In 2002, Harvard's Institute of Politics at the John F. Kennedy School of Government named Amato a Fellow. She led there a seminar entitled "Mobilizing for Justice: How to Take on the System and Make a Difference."

She has written for several publications on human rights, politics. Mother of two, she also writes about Italian-Americans and she had a regular column on parenting in Fra Noi. She taught a course called "Advocating for Social Justice in Illinois" at Northeastern Illinois University. At Loyola Law School Chicago, she taught the course "Community Lawyering and Civic Rights"(Fall 2013).

She is writing a book about public interest lawyering and the legal profession.

== Degrees ==
Harvard University, A.B. 1986, cum laude in Government and Economics; NYU School of Law, J.D., 1989.

At NYU Law, Amato was the Root-Tilden Scholar from the 7th Circuit, the Senior Note and Comment Editor of the New York University Law Review, the recipient of the Orison S. Marden for first place oralist in Moot Court, and the recipient of the NYU Vanderbilt Medal for "extraordinary contributions to the School of Law".
