= American Legion =

Organization of U.S. war veterans

- Emblem

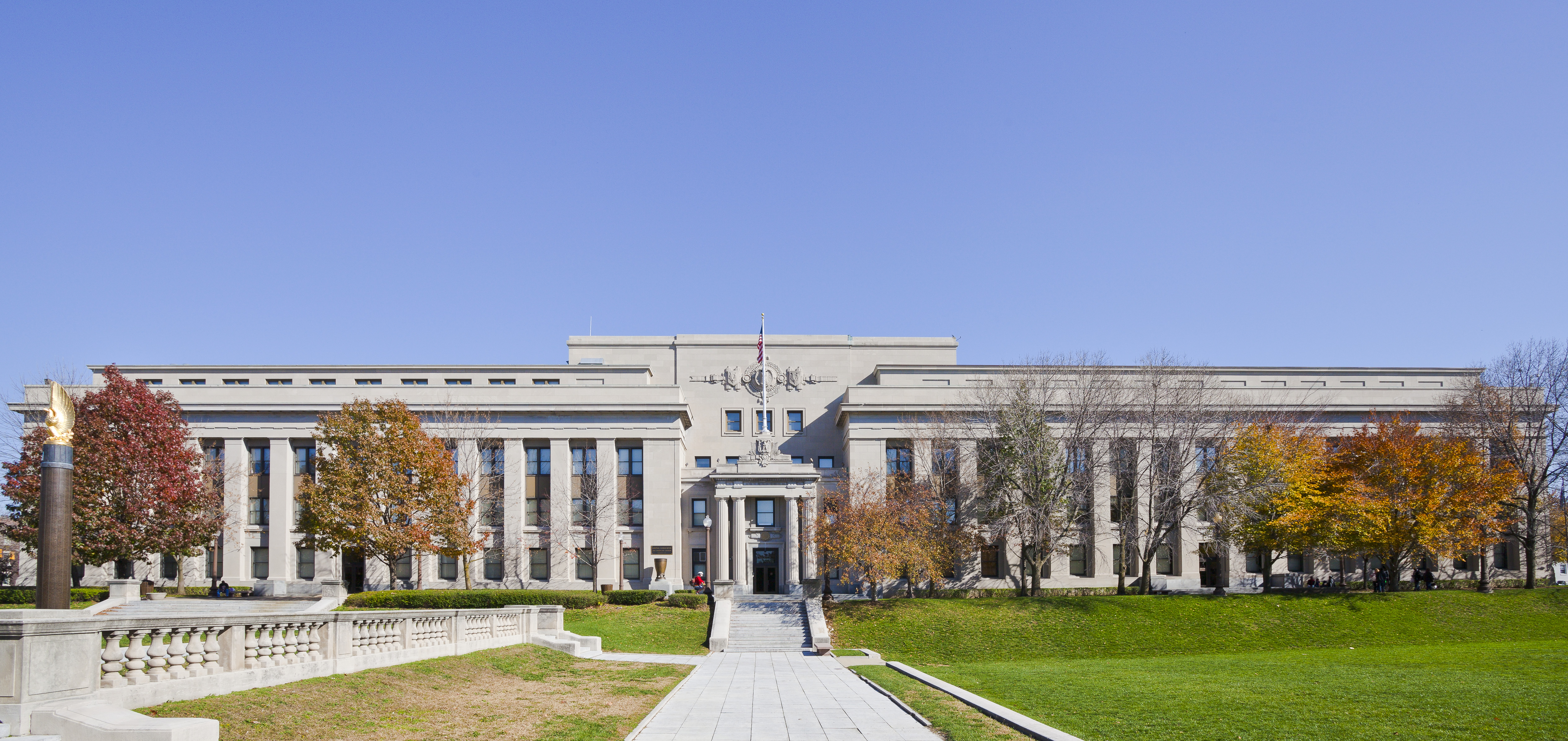
- American Legion National Headquarters; Indianapolis, Indiana, United States
- Established: March 15, 1919 (107 years ago)
- Founded at: Paris, France
- Type: 501(c)(19), war veterans' organization
- Tax ID no.: 35-0144250
- Headquarters: 700 North Pennsylvania Street, Indianapolis, Indiana
- Coordinates: 39.7770°N 86.1562°W
- Region served: Worldwide
- Members: ~1,800,000 (2018)
- National Commander: Dan K. Wiley
- National Adjutant: Rodney K. Rolland
- National Executive Committee: 61 voting members: 6 national officers; 55 committeemen
- Key people: National Headquarters Executive Director James Baca; Washington Office Executive Director Mario Marquez
- Publication: The American Legion
- Subsidiaries: Sons of The American Legion
- Secessions: Forty and Eight
- Affiliations: American Legion Auxiliary; American Legion Riders
- Website: legion.org

The American Legion, commonly known as the Legion, is an organization of U.S. veterans headquartered in Indianapolis, Indiana. It comprises state, U.S. territory, and overseas departments, in turn made up of local posts. It was established in March 1919 in Paris, France, by officers and men of the American Expeditionary Forces (AEF). It was subsequently chartered by the 66th U.S. Congress on September 16, 1919.

The Legion played the leading role in drafting and passing the Servicemen's Readjustment Act of 1944, commonly known as the "G.I. Bill". In addition to organizing commemorative events, members assist at Department of Veterans Affairs (VA) hospitals and clinics. It is active in issue-oriented U.S. politics. Its primary political activity is lobbying on behalf of veterans and service members, including for benefits such as pensions and the Veterans Health Administration.

== History ==
The American Legion was established in Paris, France, on March 15 to 17, 1919, by a thousand commissioned officers and enlisted men, delegates from all the units of the American Expeditionary Forces to an organization caucus meeting, which adopted a tentative constitution and selected the name "American Legion".

=== Civil war veteran groups ===
The aftermath of two American wars in the second half of the 19th century had seen the formation of several ex-soldiers' organizations. Former Union Army soldiers of the American Civil War of 1861–65 established a fraternal organization, the Grand Army of the Republic (GAR), while their Southern counterparts formed the United Confederate Veterans (UCV). Both organizations emerged as powerful political entities, with the GAR serving as a mainstay of the Republican Party, which controlled the presidency from the Civil War through William Howard Taft's administration except during Grover Cleveland's two terms in office.

In Southern politics, the UCV maintained an even more dominant position as a bulwark of the Democratic Party, which dominated there. The conclusion of the brief Spanish–American conflict of 1898 ushered in another soldiers' organization, the American Veterans of Foreign Service, known today as the Veterans of Foreign Wars of the United States (VFW).

=== 1918 and founding posts ===
With the end of World War I in November 1918, some American officers who had participated in the conflict began to think about creating a similar organization for the two million men who had been on European duty. The need for an organization for former members of the AEF was pressing and immediate. With the war at an end, hundreds of thousands of impatient draftees found themselves trapped in France and pining for home, certain only that untold weeks or months lay ahead of them before their return would be logistically possible. Morale plummeted. Cautionary voices were raised about an apparent correlation between disaffected and discharged troops and the Bolshevik uprisings in Russia, Finland, Germany, and Hungary.

This situation was a particular matter of concern to Lieutenant Colonel Theodore Roosevelt Jr., President Theodore Roosevelt's eldest son. One day in January 1919, he had a discussion at General Headquarters with the mobilized National Guard officer George A. White, a former newspaper editor at the Portland Oregonian. After long discussion, he suggested the immediate establishment of a new servicemen's organization including all AEF members as well as those soldiers who remained stateside as members of the Army, Navy, and Marine Corps during the war without having been shipped abroad. Roosevelt and White advocated ceaselessly for this proposal until they found sufficient support at headquarters to move forward with the plan. General John J. Pershing issued orders to a group of 20 non-career officers to report to the YMCA in Paris on February 15, 1919. Roosevelt had personally selected these men. They were joined by a number of regular Army officers Pershing selected.

Twenty National Guard and Reserve officers serving in the A. E. F., representing the S. O. S., ten infantry divisions, and several other organizations, were ordered to report in Paris. ... Included in this number were Lieutenant Colonel Theodore Roosevelt, Jr., of the First Division, Lieutenant Colonel Franklin D'Olier of the S.O.S., and Lieutenant Colonel Eric Fisher Wood of the 88th Division. All of these officers have since told me that when they left their divisions they were distinctively permeated with the desire to form a veterans' organization of some comprehensive kind. When they got to Paris they immediately went into conference with the other officers. ... A dinner was spread in the Allied Officers' Club, Rue Faubourg St. Honore, on the night of February 16th... At that dinner the American Legion was born.

— The Story of The American Legion (1919)

The session of reserve and regular officers was instructed to provide a set of laws to curb the problem of declining morale. After three days, the officers presented a series of proposals, including eliminating restrictive regulations, organizing additional athletic and recreational events, and expanding leave time and entertainment programs. At the end of the first day, the officers retired to the Inter-Allied Officers Club, a converted home across the street from the YMCA building. There, Roosevelt told them of his proposal for a new veterans' society. Most of those present were rapidly won to Roosevelt's plan. The officers decided to make all their actions provisional until an elected convention of delegates could convene and did not predetermine a program for the unnamed veterans organization. Instead, they chose to expand their number with a large preliminary meeting, to consist of an equal number of elected delegates to represent both enlisted men and commissioned officers.

A provisional executive committee of four men emerged from the February 15 "Roosevelt dinner": Roosevelt in the first place, who was to return to the U.S. and obtain his military discharge when able, and then to gather assistants and promote the idea of the new veterans' organization among demobilized troops there; White, who was to travel to France touring the AEF camps and explaining the idea; veteran wartime administrator Eric Fisher Wood, who was to establish a central office and maintain contact with the various combat divisions and headquarters staffs, as well as publicize activities to the press; and former Ohio Congressman Ralph D. Cole.

Preparations for a convention in Paris began apace. Wood prepared a convention call and "invitations" were distributed to about 2,000 officers and enlisted men and publicized in the March 14, 1919 issue of Stars and Stripes. The convention call expressed the desire to form "one permanent nation-wide organization...composed of all parties, all creeds, and all ranks who wish to perpetuate the relationships formed while in military service." In addition to the personal invitations distributed, the published announcement indicated that "any officer or enlisted man not invited who is in Paris at the time of the meeting is invited to be present and to have a voice in the meeting." The conclave was slated to begin on March 15.

The site of Ferdinand Branstetter Post No. 1 is a vacant lot in Van Tassell, Wyoming, where the first American Legion post in the U.S. was established in 1919. Branstetter was a Van Tassell resident who died in World War I. The structure housing the post has since been demolished. The site was listed on the National Register of Historic Places in 1969. In 1969, it was hoped that an interpretative sign would be put up, and also possibly that a restored post building would be constructed.

The first post of the Legion, General John Joseph Pershing Post Number 1 in Washington, DC, was organized on March 7, 1919, and obtained the first charter issued to any Legion post on May 19, 1919. The St. Louis caucus that year decided that Legion posts should not be named after living persons, and the first post changed its name to George Washington Post 1. The post completed the constitution and made plans for a permanent organization. It set up temporary headquarters in New York City and began its relief, employment, and Americanism programs.

On May 20, 1919, Colonel Ernest Lester Jones received a petition from 20 of the enlisted women of the U.S. Naval Reserve Force for a charter to organize a post to be known as "Betsy Ross Post No. l", composed entirely of Yeomen (F) of the U.S. Navy. In October of that year, the post changed its name to U.S.S. Jacob Jones, which commemorated the members' Navy heritage.

Congress granted The American Legion a national charter in September 1919.

The American Legion chartered Paris Post No. 1 on December 13, 1919. It was the first overseas post to be chartered and has been in continuous existence since then.

==== China ====
China Post 1, formed in 1919, and was chartered by The American Legion on April 20, 1920. It was originally named the General Frederick Townsend Ward Post No. 1, China. It is the only Post nominally headquartered in a Communist country, and has been operating in exile since 1948—presently in Colorado Springs, Colorado.

==== Paris Caucus ====
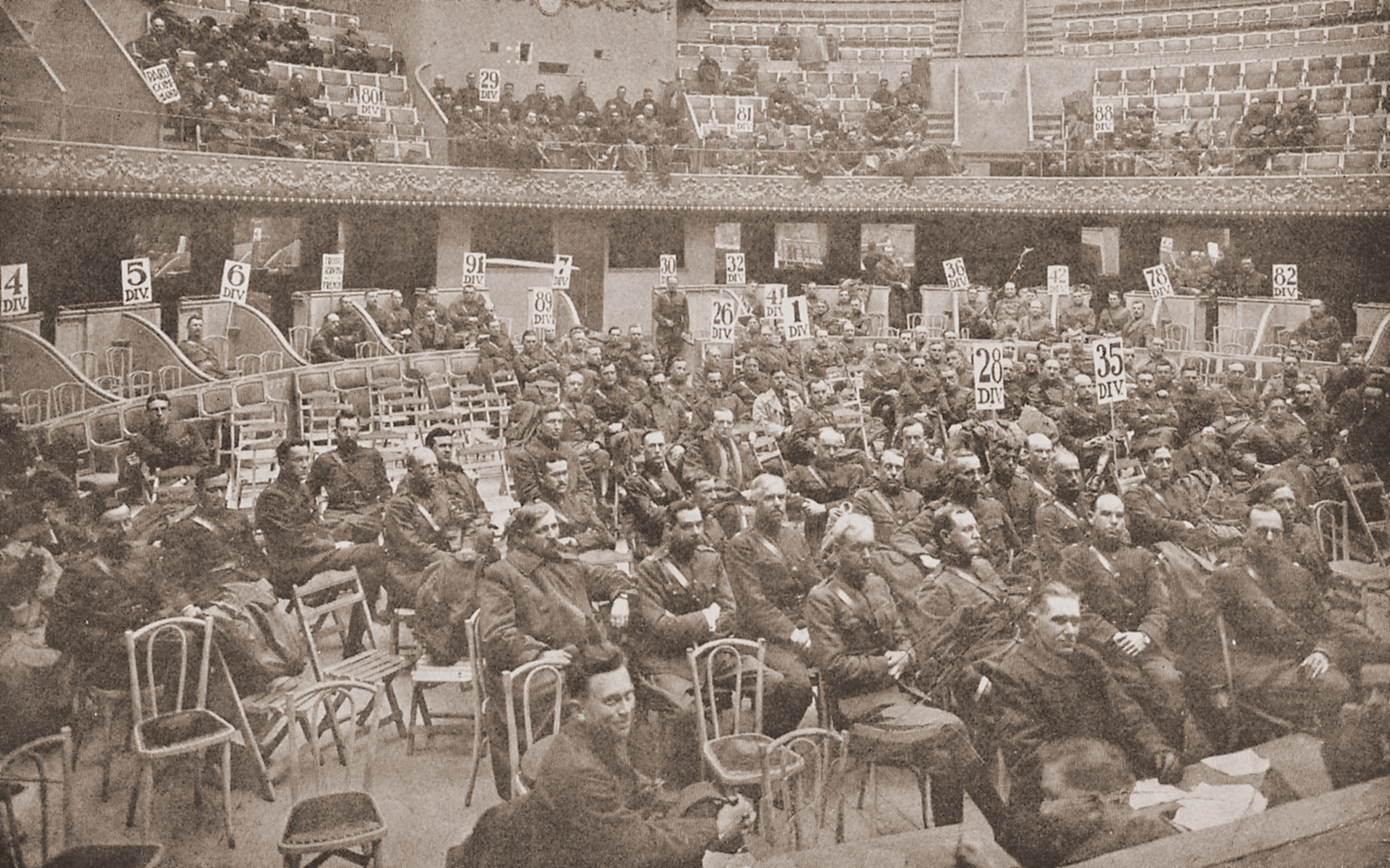
A photographer who slipped in a half-hour before the session began, with more than half the Paris caucus delegates absent

Having immediately received a blizzard of acceptances to attend the opening of the "Liberty League Caucus", as he had begun to call it, Temporary Secretary Eric Fisher Wood began to search for use of a room of sufficient size to contain the gathering. The Cirque de Paris had been retained, a large, multisided amphitheater that could accommodate about 2,000 people. Delegates began to assemble from all over France. The 10:00 am scheduled start was delayed by various logistical problems, with a beginning finally made shortly after 2:45 pm.

As "Temporary Chairman" Teddy Roosevelt Jr. had already departed for America, the session was gaveled to order by Wood, who briefly recounted Roosevelt's idea and the story of the 20 AEF officers who had jointly helped to give the new organization form. In his opening remarks, Wood recommended to the delegates of the so-called Paris Caucus that they do three things: first, set up an apparatus to conduct a formal founding conference in the U.S. sometime in the winter; second, draft a tentative name for the organization; and finally, compose a provisional constitution to be submitted to the founding convention for acceptance or rejection.

William G. Price Jr. was selected to preside. Convention rules were decided upon and four 15-member committees were chosen. The Committee on Name reported back that it had considered a dozen potential names, including Veterans of the Great War, Liberty League, American Comrades of the Great War, Legion of the Great War, and The American Legion, among others. This list was whittled down to five ranked choices for the consideration of the Caucus, with "The American Legion" the preferred option. It was noted in passing during the course of debate on the topic that Roosevelt had been responsible for an earlier organization called "The American Legion" in 1914, a "preparedness" society with a claimed membership of 35,000 that had been absorbed into the Council of National Defense in 1916.

The Committee on Constitution reported with a report containing the draft of a Preamble for the organization, specifying organizational objectives. This document stated that the group:

desiring to perpetuate the principles of Justice, Freedom, and Democracy for which we have fought, to inculcate the duty and obligation of the citizen to the State; to preserve the history and incidents of our participation in the war; and to cement the ties of comradeship formed in service, do propose to found and establish an Association for the furtherance of the foregoing purposes.

The majority report of the Committee on Convention recommended that 11 am on November 11, 1919—one year to the hour after the termination of hostilities in World War I—be selected as the date and time for the convocation of a national convention. No location was specified.

The Committee on Permanent Organization recommended an organization based upon territorial units rather than those based upon military organizations, governed by an Executive Committee of 50, with half of these from the officer corps and half from the ranks of enlisted men.

==== St. Louis Caucus ====
The Paris Caucus in March was by its nature limited to AEF soldiers who remained in Europe; a parallel organizational meeting for those who had returned to the American preparatory to a formal organizational convention was deemed necessary. This was a conclave dominated by the presence of Roosevelt, who called the convention to order amid mass chanting akin to that of a presidential nominating convention—"We Want Teddy! We Want Teddy!"

A minor crisis followed when Roosevelt twice declined nomination for permanent chairman of the session, to the consternation of many overwrought delegates, who sought to emphasize the symbolism of President Roosevelt's son maintaining the closest of connections with the organization.

The St. Louis Caucus's work was largely shaped by the fundamental decisions made by the earlier Paris Caucus. Its agenda was in addition carefully prepared by a 49-member "Advance Committee", which included at least one delegate from each fledgling state organization and drew up a draft program for the organization in advance of the convention's opening.

As time before the scheduled start of the convention was short, delegation to the assembly was highly irregular. On April 10, 1919, Temporary Secretary Eric Fisher Wood mailed a letter to the governors of every state, informing them of the forthcoming gathering and making note of the League's nonpartisan and patriotic nature. Follow-up cables by Roosevelt and Wood encouraged the organization of state conventions to select delegates. This was largely a failed formality, as states lacked sufficient time to organize themselves and properly elect delegates to St. Louis. In practice, the fledgling organization's provisional Executive Committee decided to allow each state delegation twice as many votes as that state had in the United States House of Representatives and left it to each to determine how to apportion those votes.

Participants at the St. Louis Caucus were enthusiastic, but the session was not productive. Fully two days were invested choosing ceremonial officers and selecting Minneapolis as the site for the organization's formal Founding Convention in the fall. Over 1,100 participants competed to gain the floor to speechify, leading one historian to call the scene a "melee" in which "disorder reigned supreme". Consequently, the gathering's passage of the program was largely a pro forma exercise, rushed through during the session's last day, with the actual decision-making about such matters as the constitution and the organization's publications done by committee at night.

The preamble of the constitution adopted in St. Louis became one of the seminal statements of the Legion's orientation and objectives:

For God and Country we associate ourselves together for the following purposes:

To uphold and defend the Constitution of the United States of America; to maintain law and order; to foster and perpetuate a 100 Percent Americanism; to preserve the memories and incidents of our association in the Great War; to inculcate a sense of individual obligation to the community, state, and nation; to combat the autocracy of both the classes and the masses; to make right the master of might; to promote peace and good will on earth; to safeguard and transmit to prosperity the principles of justice, freedom, and democracy; to consecrate and sanctify our comradeship by devotion to mutual helpfulness.

The St. Louis Caucus spent much of its time discussing resolutions: whether a stand should be taken on the League of Nations, Prohibition, or the implementation of universal military service; whether posts composed of Black soldiers should be established; and whether Secretary of War Newton D. Baker should be impeached for his apparent leniency toward conscientious objectors in the months after the war.

A particularly hard line was taken toward the American radical movement, with one resolution passed on the final day calling on Congress to "pass a bill or immediately deporting every one of those Bolsheviks or Industrial Workers of the World (IWW)." Minneapolis, Minnesota, was chosen for the site of the organization's founding convention in November over the more centrally located Chicago after much acrimonious debate about the Chicago city administration's perceived political transgressions.

==== Founding convention ====
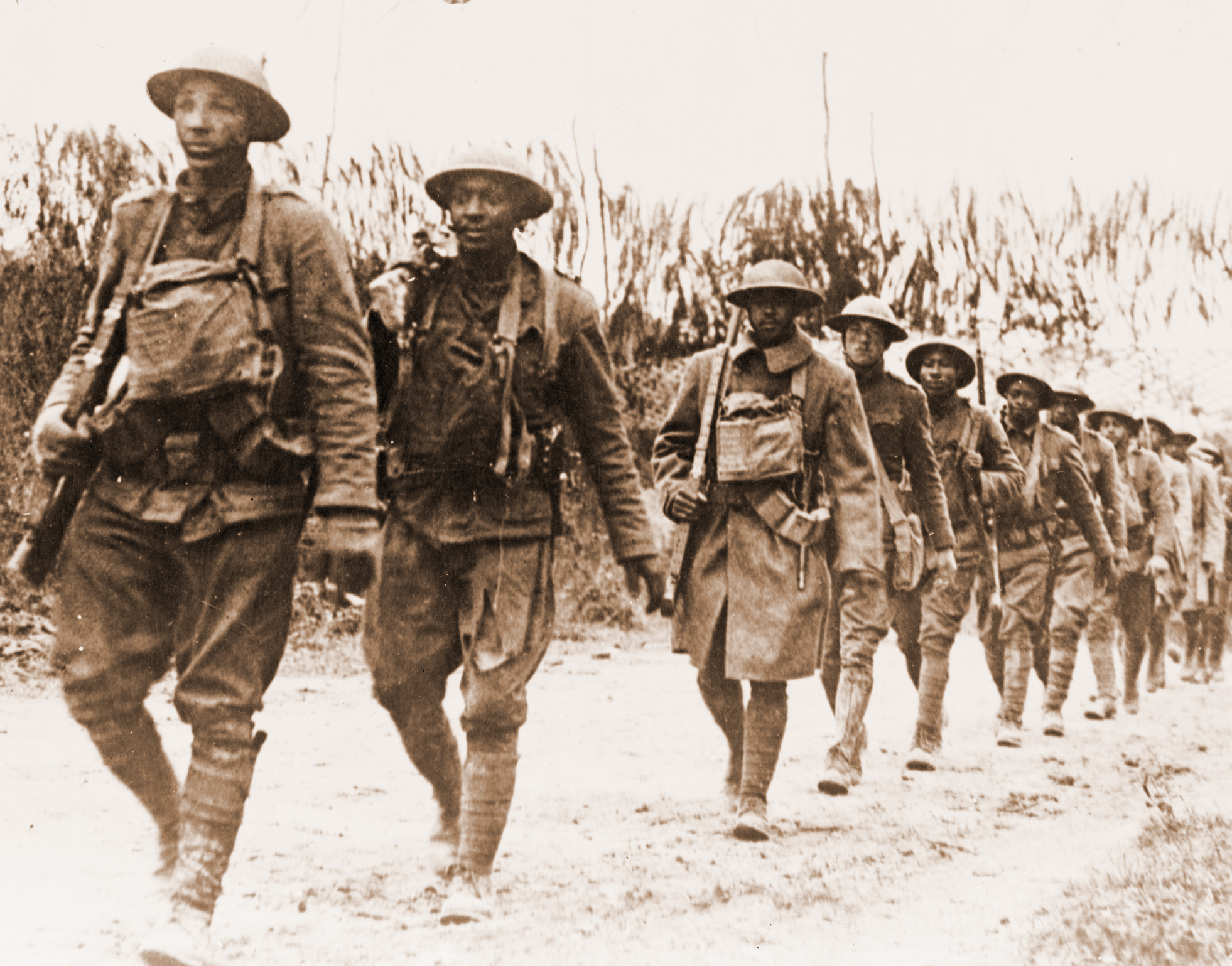
Hundreds of thousands of African-Americans were in segregated units in World War I, mostly assigned to non-combat duties. The early American Legion left the question of integration, the formation of segregated "Negro" posts, or exclusion of black soldiers from membership altogether up to the states and the posts themselves, often resulting in gross disparities of opportunity.

The formal founding convention was held in Minneapolis, Minnesota, from November 10 to 12, 1919. 684 delegates from across the nation attended.

From the outset, The American Legion maintained a strictly nonpartisan orientation toward electoral politics. The group wrote a specific prohibition of the endorsement of political candidates into its constitution, declaring:

this organization shall be absolutely non-political and shall not be used for the dissemination of partisan principles or for the promotion of the candidacy of any person seeking public office or preferment; and no candidate for or incumbent of a salaried elective public office shall hold any office in The American Legion or in any branch or post thereof.

One semi-official historian of the organization has noted the way that this explicit refusal to affiliate with a political party had the paradoxical effect of rapidly building great political power for the organization, as politicians from both of the "old parties" competed for the favor of the Legion's massive and active membership.

One of the gathering's primary accomplishments was the establishment of a permanent National Legislative Committee to advance the Legion's political objectives as its lobbying arm. The first iteration of this official Washington, D.C.–based lobby for the Legion included only four members—two Republicans and two Democrats. After 1920 the National Legislative Committee was expanded to consist of one member from each state, with additional effort made at the state level to exert pressure upon various state legislatures.

Chief on the Legion's legislative agenda was a dramatic improvement of the level of compensation for soldiers who suffered permanent disability during the war. At the time of the end of World War I, American law stated that soldiers who suffered total disability were to receive only the base pay of a private—$30 per month. The Legion concentrated its lobbying effort in 1919 on passage of legislation increasing payment for total disability suffered in the war to $80 a month—a sum roughly sufficient to provide a living wage. Those partially disabled by their wounds would receive lesser payments. A flurry of lobbying by the Legion's National Legislative Committee in conjunction with cables National Commander Franklin D'Olier sent to Congressional leaders helped pass this legislation by the end of 1919.

The Legion's chief base of support during its first years was among the officers corps of the reserves and the National Guard. The regular army was comparatively small and its representation in the League in its earliest days was even more limited. Consequently, for nearly two decades The Legion maintained a largely isolationist perspective, best expressed in three resolutions passed by the Minneapolis founding convention:

1. That a large standing army is uneconomic and un-American. National safety with freedom from militarism is best assured by a national citizen army and navy based on the democratic principles of equality of obligation and opportunity for all.

2. That we favor universal military training and the administration of such a policy should be removed from the complete control of any exclusively military organization or caste.

3. That we are strongly opposed to compulsory military service in time of peace.

Additional resolutions the founding convention passed emphasized the need for military preparedness, albeit through a citizens' army of reservists and National Guardsmen rather than the costly and undemocratic structure of a vast standing army led by a professional military caste. This nationalist isolationism remained in place until the eve of American entry into World War II.

==== Centralia massacre ====
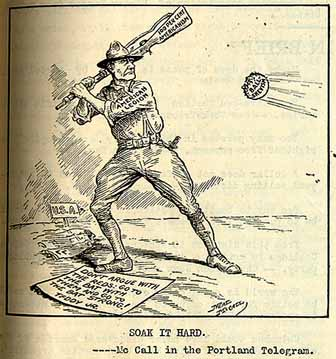
A political cartoon from the Portland Telegram depicting a Legionnaire preparing to hit a ball labeled "Bolshevism" with a rifle butt labeled "100 per cent Americanism" beside a quote from Theodore Roosevelt: "Don't argue with the reds; go to bat with them and go to the bat strong!"

November 11, 1919, the first anniversary of Armistice Day and the occasion of the Legion's formal launch at its Minneapolis Founding Convention, was also a historic moment of violence and controversy. On that day a parade of Legionnaires took place in the mill town of Centralia, in southwestern Washington. Some of the marchers planned at the conclusion of their patriotic demonstration to storm and ransack the local hall maintained by the Industrial Workers of the World, a labor union founded 14 years earlier at a convention of socialists, anarchists, Marxists, and radical trade unionists from all over the U.S., which had been the target of multiple arrests, large trials, and various incidents of mob violence during the months of American participation in World War I. But the plans for this violence had reached union members (commonly called Wobblies), and 30 or 40 IWW members had been seen coming and going at their hall on the day of the march, some of them carrying guns.

At 2 p.m., the march began at the city park, led by a marching band playing "Over There". Marchers included Boy Scouts, members of the local Elks Lodge, active-duty sailors, and marines, with about 80 members of the newly established Centralia and Chehalis posts bringing up the rear. As the parade turned onto Tower Avenue and crossed Second Street, it passed IWW Hall. The parade stopped and Legionnaires surrounded the hall.

Parade Marshal Adrian Cormier rode up on horseback and, according to some witnesses, blew a whistle giving the signal to the Legionnaires to charge the IWW headquarters building. A group of marchers rushed the hall, smashing the front plate-glass window and attempting to kick the door in. As the door gave way, shots were fired at the intruders from within. This provided the signal to other armed IWW members, who were stationed across the street, to set up crossfire against potential invaders, and they also began firing on the Legionnaires. In less than a minute the firing was over, with three AL members left dead or dying and others wounded.

Taken by surprise by the armed defense of IWW headquarters, many Legionnaires rushed home to arm themselves, while others broke into local hardware stores to steal guns and ammunition. Now armed, a furious mob reassembled and charged the IWW Hall again, capturing six IWW members inside. The mob destroyed the hall's front porch and a large bonfire was built, upon which were torched the local Wobblies' official records, books, newspapers and mattresses.

One local Wobbly, Wesley Everest, escaped through a back door when he saw the mob approaching the hall. He fled into nearby woods, exchanging gunshots with his pursuers. One of those chasing him was hit in the chest several times with bullets and killed, increasing the Legionnaires' death toll to four. Everest was taken alive, kicked and beaten, with a belt wrapped around his neck as he was dragged back to town to be lynched. But local police intervened, and Everest was taken to jail, where he was thrown down on the concrete floor. At 7:30 pm, on cue, all city lights in town went out for 15 minutes and Legionnaires stopped cars and forced them to turn out their headlights. The Elks Hall gathering entered the jail without meeting resistance and took Everest, dragging him away to a waiting car but leaving other incarcerated Wobblies untouched. A procession of six cars drove west to a railroad bridge across the Chehalis River.

A rope was attached to Everest's neck and he was pushed off the bridge, but the lynching attempt was bungled and Everest's neck was not snapped by the fall. Everest was hauled up again, a longer rope was substituted, and Everest was pushed off the bridge again. The lynch mob then shined their car headlights on the hanging Everest and shot him.

Although a mob milled around the jail all night, terrorizing the occupants, no further acts of extra-legal retribution were taken. Everest's body was cut down the next morning, falling into the riverbed below, where it remained all day. As night fell, Everest's body was hauled back to town, the rope still around his neck, where it was refused by local undertakers and left on the floor of the jail in sight of the prisoners all night. No charges were ever filed in connection with the lynching.

A grand jury ultimately indicted 12 IWW members for first-degree murder in connection with the killing of the four Legionnaires and a local left-wing lawyer was charged as an accessory to the crime. A January 1920 trial resulted in the conviction of six defendants on charges of second-degree murder. A memorial statue created by Alonzo Victor Lewis, known as The Sentinel, was dedicated in Centralia's George Washington Park in 1924 to honor the four legionnaires - Casagranda, Grimm, Hubbard, and McElfresh - killed during the Armistice Day Riot.

=== Expansion in 1920s ===
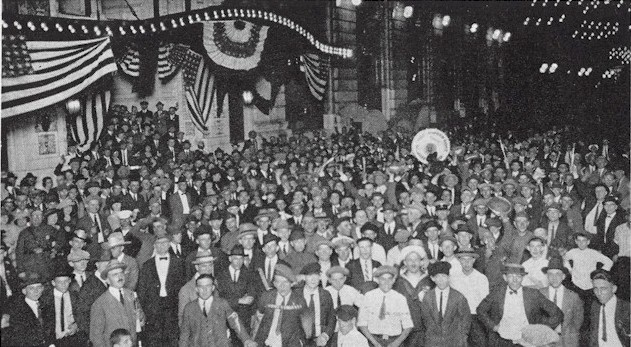
The 1922 national convention in New Orleans

The Legion was very active in the 1920s. The organization was formally nonpartisan, endorsing no political party. Instead the group worked to the spread of the ideology of Americanism and acted as a lobbying organization on behalf of issues of importance to veterans, with particular emphasis on winning a "soldier's bonus" payment from the government. Led by top lobbyist Colonel John Thomas Taylor, it helped secure passage in 1924 over presidential veto of The World War Adjusted Compensation Act, or Bonus Act. The law granted a life insurance policy to veterans of military service in World War I. The actual payout was promised for 1945, but veterans would get a certificate immediately and they could borrow against it from banks.

The Legion also served a strong social function, building and buying "clubhouses" in communities across America at which its members could gather, reflect, network, and socialize. The Legion was instrumental in the creation of the U.S. Veterans' Bureau, now known as the Department of Veterans Affairs. The Legion also created its own American Legion Baseball Program, hosting national tournaments annually since 1926.

Commander Travers D. Carmen awarded Charles Lindbergh the Legion's first "Distinguished Service Medal" on July 22, 1927. The Legion's national convention was held in Paris in September 1927. A major part of this was a drum and bugle corps competition in which approximately 14,000 members took part.

According to William Pencak:

Veterans and their role in American society were extremely controversial in the twenties and thirties, both because of actual issues such as the Bonus or veterans’ support for defense expenditures, but also because critics saw in the American Legion a mirror of the powerful fascist movements in Europe, such as the Nazis in Germany and Fascists in Italy. The comparison reflected fear more than rationality: the Legion had no need or desire to overthrow the government. It was able to achieve nearly all its goals through traditional political channels and strongly supported constitutional authority. Its members did not wear military uniforms (only the familiar caps), elected its officers through democratic means—although as in all associations, an active elite ran the show—and had black, Catholic, and Jewish members. It boasted of Jewish national chaplains and Catholic national commanders. . . .The Legion’s anti-radical program was typical of conservatives throughout American history, who . . . rarely concerned themselves with the rights of union organizers or socialist ‘‘agitators’’ despite the formal constitutional protections.

However, it must be noted that antisemitism was not a founding principle of Italian Fascism, and Jews also participated in the early Fascist movement.

==== Promoting "Americanism" ====
The Legion's efforts to promote Americanism during the 1920s included urging its members to report on publication materials perceived to be subversive, left-wing, or reflective of radical foreign political views, and established a National Americanism Commission to oversee its actions related to subversive activities. It commissioned the development of textbooks that promoted American patriotism, worked with members of the National Education Association to promote teaching history from an American perspective, and sought the removal of textbooks it saw as "un-American". In 1940 the Legion joined conservative publicists who were attacking high school American history textbooks by Harold Rugg. They complained the books were politically loaded against business and promoted socialism.

The Legion supported legislation restricting immigration and seditious speech and used its influence in an effort to deny public forums to speakers whose views it opposed.

In a 1923 interview, National Legion Commander Alvin Owsley cited Italian Fascism for its success in defending that nation against Communism. Owsley told a reporter:

If ever needed, the American Legion stands ready to protect our country's institutions and ideals as the Fascisti dealt with the destructionists who menaced Italy! ... The American Legion is fighting every element that threatens our democratic government—Soviets, anarchists, IWW, revolutionary socialists and every other red ... Do not forget that the Fascisti are to Italy what the American Legion is to the United States.

The Legion invited Benito Mussolini to speak at its convention as late as 1930, but he declined.

=== Great Depression ===
The American Legion Memorial Bridge in Traverse City, Michigan, was completed in 1930. The Traverse City city commission decided to purchase dedication plaques for $100 at the request of the Legion in 1930.

The Sons of the American Legion formed at the 14th National Convention in Portland, Oregon, on September 12–15, 1932. Membership is limited to the male descendants of members of The American Legion, or deceased individuals who served in the armed forces of the United States during times specified by the Legion.

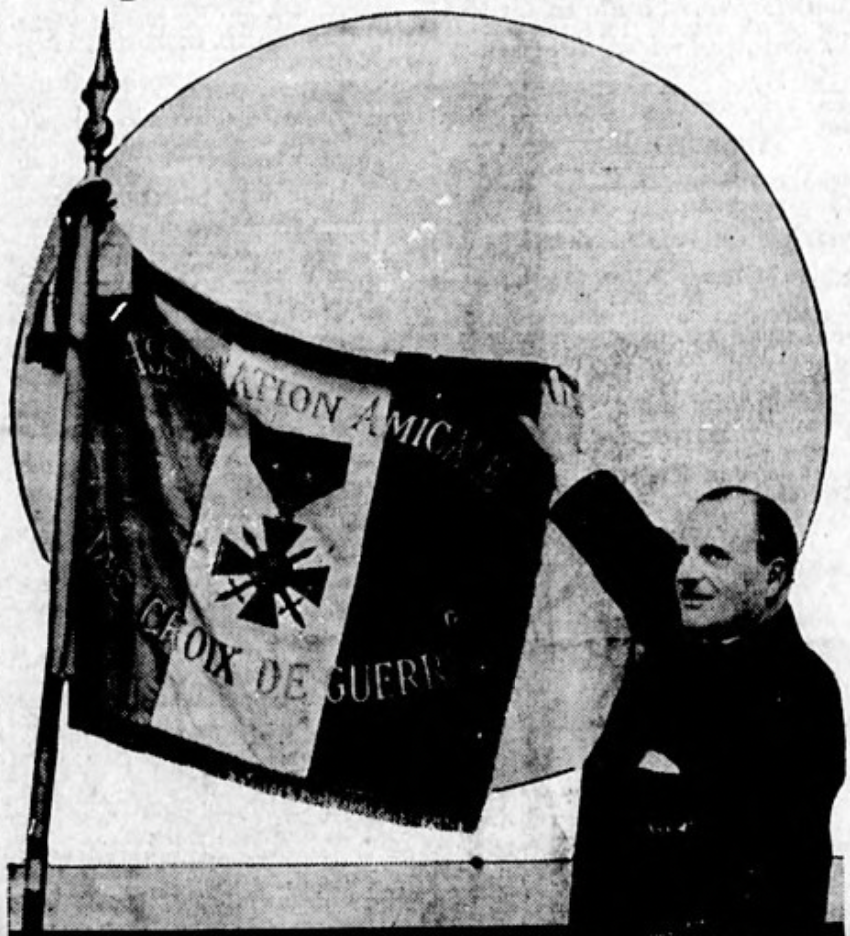
American Legion flag from 1931

In the spring of 1933, at the very beginning of his presidency, President Franklin Delano Roosevelt sought to balance the federal budget by sharp reductions in veterans benefits, which constituted one quarter of the federal budget. The Economy Act of 1933 cut disability pensions and established strict new guidelines for proving disabilities. The Legion generally supported the FDR administration and the Act, while the VFW was loudly opposed. After a VFW convention heard speeches denouncing FDR's programs, the Legion invited Roosevelt to speak and he won the convention's support. Nevertheless, the Legion's stance was unpopular with its membership and membership plummeted in 1933 by 20% as 160,000 failed to renew their memberships. The VFW then campaigned for a "Bonus Bill" that would immediately pay World War I veterans what they were due in 1945 under the 1924 World War Adjusted Compensation Act. The Legion's failure to take a similar position allowed the much smaller, less prestigious VFW to rally support while accusing the Legion of ties to the FDR Administration and business interests.

In 1935, the first Boys' State convened in Springfield, Illinois. The Legion's first National High School Oratorical Contest was held in 1938.

After the 1935 Labor Day Hurricane, which killed about 480 former servicemen and women, the Legion was very critical of the government and the safety of the New Deal's Works Progress Administration camps. When Col. Taylor testified about the event in front of the House Committee on World War Veterans' Legislation in 1937, he tried to have the Legion's report "Murder at Matecumbe" read into the Congressional Record. He was stopped by Chairman John Elliott Rankin and asked to leave a copy for the committee to review. It was made clear that the copy would not be put into the record.

=== World War II ===
In 1942, the Legion adopted the practice of the VFW to become a perpetual organization, rather than die off as its membership aged as that of the Grand Army of the Republic was rapidly doing. The Legion's charter was changed to allow veterans of World War II to join.

==== G.I. Bill ====
Throughout the 1940s, the Legion was active in providing support for veterans and soldiers who fought in World War II. The Legion wrote the original draft of the Veterans Readjustment Act, which became known as the G.I. Bill. The original draft is preserved at the Legion's National Headquarters. It was passed in 1944 by a conservative coalition in Congress that wanted to reach practically all wartime veterans, as opposed to the Roosevelt administration that wanted a much smaller program limited to poverty-stricken veterans. The Legion mobilized its members across the country and secured passage in June 1944. Benefits included low-cost home mortgages, low-interest loans to start a business or buy a farm, cash payments of tuition and living expenses to attend high school, college or vocational/technical school, as well as one year of unemployment compensation. It was available to veterans who had been on active duty during the war years for at least 120 days and had not been dishonorably discharged—exposure to combat was not required. The Legion helped veterans fill out the paperwork and obtain the benefits.

==== Debates about Japanese American veterans ====
Many posts and departments refused Japanese Americans entry into the Legion, until white officers from the 442nd RCT lobbied on behalf of their troops, gaining charters for the segregated Nisei Post 1183 in Chicago, Illinois, and a joint Chinese and Japanese Cathay Post 185 in Denver, Colorado. California veterans managed to convince a forward-thinking VFW state commander to grant charters for 14 segregated Nisei VFW posts to returning veterans there; however, Washington and Oregon state commanders for both the VFW and the Legion refused, and those veterans were forced to form their own independent Nisei veteran organizations. Post 22 of Hood River, Oregon, even passed a resolution to remove the names of 16 local Japanese-American veterans from its roll of honor. Scathing editorials in The Oregonian and The New York Times eventually caused the post to reverse its course, restoring all the names of Nisei servicemen from Hood River to the wall.

=== Cold War ===
The American Legion Building in Garden City, Kansas, in 1979

American Legion Post and Masonic lodge in Paso Robles, California, in 1977

American Legion in San Antonio, in 1982

As the new veterans returned home, membership soared to 3.3 million in 1946, triple the prewar number. There were another million members in the Women's Auxiliary. Its main objective after the war was to set up universal military service, but it had to settle for selective conscription. The first Boys Nation program was held in 1946.

Late in 1950, at least some local Legion organizations began to support Senator Joe McCarthy, sponsoring his appearance at an "Americanism" rally in Houston. During his speech, the senator falsely claimed there were 205 Communists in the U.S. State Department. The Legion also took a McCarthyist stance on film, threatening to boycott any theater that screened director Edward Dmytryk's Salt to the Devil (also known as Give Us This Day) (1949) because of Dmytryk's status on the blacklist.

At the Legion's 1951 convention, it formally endorsed its nondenominational "Back to God" movement. When launching the program in 1953 with a national television broadcast that included speeches by President Eisenhower and Vice President Nixon, the Legion's National Commander Lewis K. Gough said it promoted "regular church attendance, daily family prayer, and the religious training of children."

The Legion's Americanism activities continued through to the 1950s. It promoted the passage of state bills requiring loyalty oaths of school teachers, and supported the activities of anti-Communist newspaper publishers, including William Randolph Hearst, in identifying Communist sympathizers in academic institutions. It was also influential in the creation of state-level legislative investigations into communist or un-American activities, and staged a mock Communist takeover of Mosinee, Wisconsin, that garnered national headlines. Its programs were rejuvenated by increased membership after World War II, and in its 1950 convention called for members of the American Communist Party to be tried for treason. Along with the VFW, it maintained files on supposed Communist sympathizers, and it shared the fruits of its research with government investigators. Local posts picketed films they perceived as anti-American, and the national organization was formally involved in Hollywood's efforts to clear films of such influence. The list of names and organizations the Legion provided to movie studios formed the basis for the Hollywood blacklist, and supported the work of the House Un-American Activities Committee and its predecessors before and during the Cold War. It was unsuccessful in applying pressure to the movie studios when the blacklist began to crumble in the late 1950s.

The Legion's political activities were opposed from an early date by organizations like the American Civil Liberties Union (ACLU), which characterized them as a danger to political and civil rights. In a report issued in 1921, the ACLU documented 50 instances of what it described as illegal acts of violence by Legionnaires. In 1927, the ACLU reported that the Legion "had replaced the [Ku Klux] Klan as the most active agent of intolerance and repression in the country. The Legion branded the ACLU as an un-American organization at every convention it held between 1920 and 1962. In 1952, the Legion asked for a congressional investigation into the ACLU to determine if it was a communist or communist front organization.

Veterans of the Korean War were approved for membership in The Legion in 1950, and The American Legion Child Welfare Foundation was formed in 1954.

=== Foreign affairs ===
Although the Legion paid very close attention to the threat of domestic communism, it did not pay much attention to foreign affairs before 1945. It ignored the League of Nations, and was hostile to the Washington Naval Conference of 1921 that rolled back the global naval arms race in the 1920s. Pacifism was popular in the 1920s, and Legion locals ridiculed it and sometimes booed the Women's International League for Peace and Freedom. During World War II, it accepted the wartime alliance with Stalin against Nazi Germany. As the Cold War emerged in 1946–47, the Legion paid increasing attention to an anti-Soviet foreign policy. Its Counter-Subversive Activities Committee in 1946 began publishing the American Legion Firing Line, a newsletter for members which provides information on communist, fascist, and other extremist groups to its subscribers. It warned members against far-right groups such as the John Birch Society and anti-Semitic groups. By the late 1950s the newsletter became much more interested in foreign affairs.

The Legion's policy resolutions endorsed large-scale defense spending and the deployment of powerful new weapon systems from the hydrogen bomb in the 1950s to Reagan's Strategic Defense Initiative in the 1980s. Harry Truman was the first Legionnaire to occupy the White House, but he came under Legion attack for waging a limited war in Korea and not following the advice of General Douglas MacArthur in attacking China. By 1961 the Legion outright rejected the policy of containment, and called for the "liberation of the captive peoples in Eastern Europe". Legion members typically hailed Barry Goldwater as their hero, but like Goldwater they rejected the extremism of the John Birch Society. The Legion supported increased intervention in Vietnam, as well as anti-Communist forces in Central America and Afghanistan. The Legion never saw much benefit in the United Nations, and like other conservatives worried about a loss of American sovereignty to international bodies. The collapse of Soviet-style communism in Eastern Europe and in Russia itself saw the Legion looking to new venues for militaristic action. Thus, it praised President George H. W. Bush's intervention in Kuwait against Iraq in 1990. After the September 11 attacks, it vigorously endorsed President George W. Bush's strategy of a global war on terror, and supported the invasion of Iraq in 2003.

=== Local affairs ===
On May 30, 1969, the Cabin John Bridge, which carried the Capital Beltway (I-495) across the Potomac River northwest of Washington, was officially renamed to the "American Legion Memorial Bridge" in a ceremony led by Lt. Gen. Lewis B. Hershey, director of the U.S. Selective Service System.

In 1976, an outbreak of bacterial pneumonia occurred in a convention of the Legion at The Bellevue-Stratford Hotel in Philadelphia. This pneumonia killed 34 people at the convention and later became known as Legionnaires' disease (Legionellosis). The bacterium that causes the illness was later named Legionella.

=== Open to merchant seamen ===
In 1988, after over 44 years of opposing U.S. Merchant seamen from receiving benefits under the G.I. Bill, they allowed Merchant seamen to join the American Legion. This followed Merchant seamen being granted limited veterans status by the United States Secretary of the Air Force on January 19, 1988.

=== Flag issues ===
After a 1989 U.S. Supreme Court decision (Texas v. Johnson), the American Legion launched and funded an unsuccessful campaign to win a constitutional amendment against harming the flag of the United States. The Legion formed the Citizens' Flag Honor Guard and it later became the Citizens Flag Alliance.

=== Close of the 20th century ===
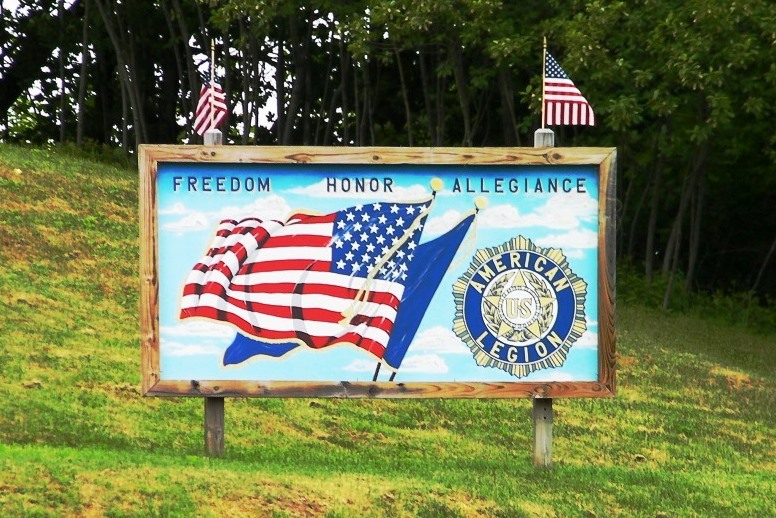
American Legion sign in Maine

In 1993, the Commonwealth of Massachusetts renamed a bridge in the city of Chicopee to the "American Legion Memorial Bridge".

Also in 1993, two members of Garden City, Michigan, Post 396 shared an idea that would bond motorcycle enthusiasts in the Legion from the idea of Chuck Dare and post commander Bill Kaledas, creating the American Legion Riders. Joined by 19 other founding members, the group soon found itself inundated with requests for information about the new group. As a source of information a website was set up, and it continues to be a source of information worldwide. By 2009, the Legion Riders program had grown to over 1,000 chapters and 100,000 members in the United States and overseas.

In a letter to U.S. President Bill Clinton in May 1999, the Legion urged the immediate withdrawal of U.S. troops from Operation Allied Force in Yugoslavia. The National Executive Committee of the Legion met and adopted a resolution unanimously that stated, in part, that they would only support military operations if "Guidelines be established for the mission, including a clear exit strategy" and "That there be support of the mission by the U.S. Congress and the American people."

=== 21st century ===
The American Legion sponsors Boys State and Girls State, an honor given to one male student and one female student in each high school, with selected individuals participating in a conference to learn about patriotism and government. On a national level, this occurs through Boys Nation and Girls Nation.

In 2006, the Chairman of the House Veterans Affairs Committee, Steve Buyer (R-Ind.), announced that he planned to eliminate the annual congressional hearings for Veterans Service Organizations that was established by President Dwight D. Eisenhower. In response, National Commander Thomas L. Bock said, "I am extremely disappointed in Chairman Buyer's latest effort to ignore the Veterans Service Organizations. Eliminating annual hearings before a joint session of the Veterans Affairs Committees will lead to continued budgetary shortfalls for VA resulting in veterans being underserved."

The Legion has criticized the ACLU for using the threat of attorney fees to pressure locally elected bodies into removing religion from the public square. As such the Legion states that it "is leading a nationwide effort to combat the secular cleansing of our American heritage", stating that the phrase "separation of church and state" is nowhere mentioned in the First Amendment to the United States Constitution The American Legion released a document titled "In the Footsteps of the Founders – A Guide to Defending American Values" to be available to the citizens of the United States of America. The veteran's organization has done this to curtail religious-establishment cases against the Boy Scouts and the official display of the Ten Commandments and other religious symbols on public property.

In October 2011, National Commander Jimmie L. Foster objected to courts allowing homosexuals to serve openly in the military.

On March 25, 2014, the Legion testified before Congress in favor of the bill "To amend title 38, United States Code, to reestablish the Professional Certification and Licensure Advisory Committee of the Department of Veterans Affairs (H.R. 2942; 113th Congress)." They argued that the legislation would "benefit service members, as well as those who eventually employ veterans in civilian work-force easing the placement of qualified veterans in civilian careers, and matching civilian employers with skilled veteran employees." The American Legion argued that this committee was important to the process of matching military certifications with their corresponding civilian ones, smoothing that transition for veterans, and that the committee provided much needed expertise on these matters to the VA. The Legion said that "there is a definite need to resume this independent body with expertise in matters relating to licensing and credentialing which can present new solutions to VA's senior leadership and congressional members as well as other stakeholders."

In 2014, Verna L. Jones was appointed as the first female executive director of the Legion. In August 2017, Denise H. Rohan was elected as the first female national commander of the Legion.

The American Legion opened membership to all honorably discharged veterans on July 30, 2019, when the Let Everyone Get Involved in Opportunities for National Service (LEGION) Act was signed into law. The act:

- Expanded eligibility to include anyone who served at least one day of federal active duty since December 7, 1941
- Eliminated the need for service during previously defined wartime periods. Before the act, membership was restricted to veterans who served during seven specific war eras.
- Recognized ongoing service by acknowledging that the U.S. has been involved in continuous global military operations since WWII.

Those eligible are all honorably discharged veterans who served federal active duty since December 7, 1941, current active duty military, and National Guard and Reserve members if activated under Title 10 orders during qualifying periods. This change particularly affects veterans who served during so-called "peace-time" gaps between declared wars. It acknowledged their service and allowed them to join the Legion, access benefits, and participate in community support efforts.

== Headquarters ==
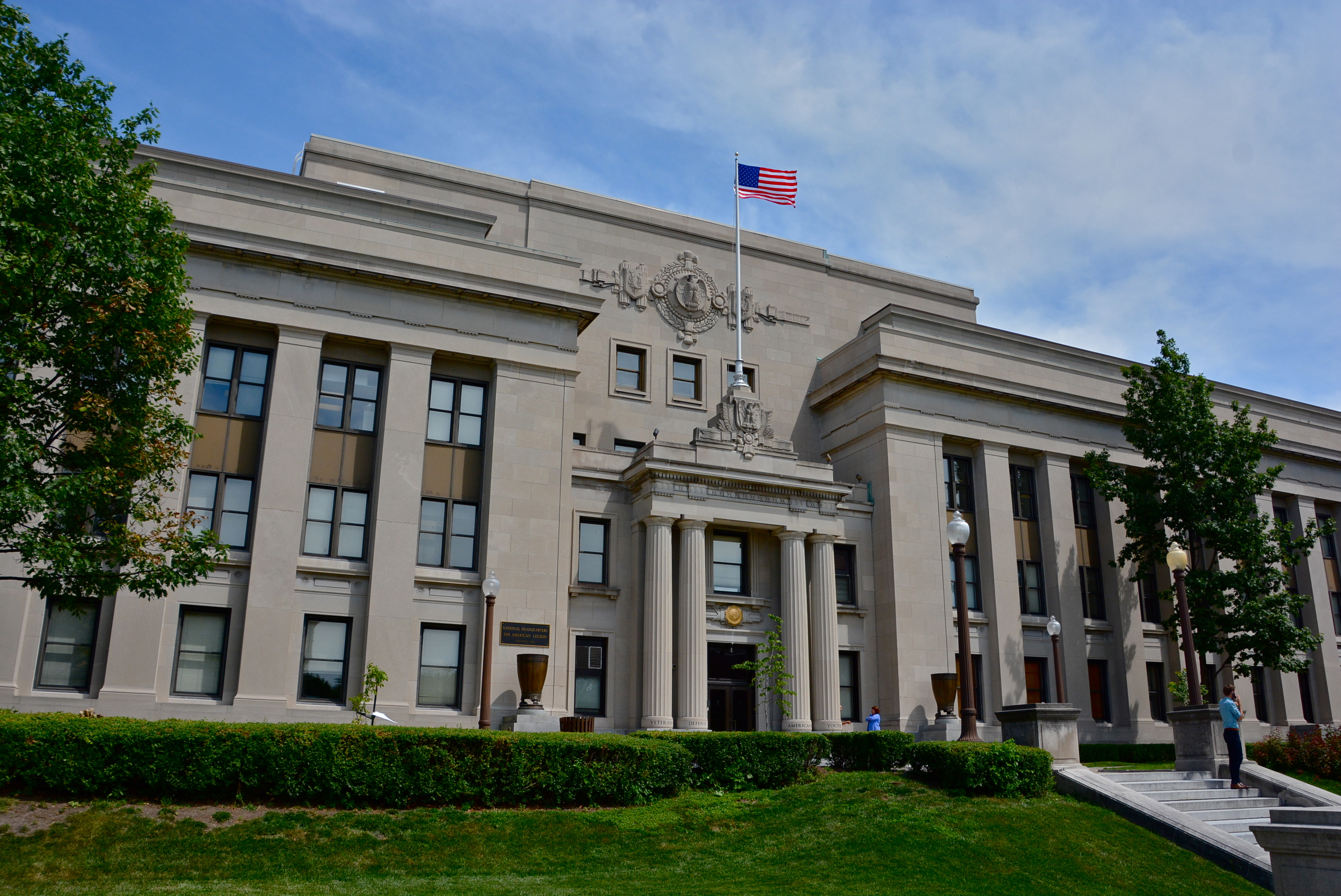
American Legion national headquarters in Indianapolis, 2015

The national headquarters, informally known as American Legion headquarters, is located on the Indiana World War Memorial Plaza at 700 North Pennsylvania Street in Indianapolis, Indiana. It is the headquarters for the National Commander of The American Legion and also houses the library and archives, the Emil A. Blackmore Museum, Membership, Internal Affairs, Public Relations, and The American Legion magazine's editorial offices. The national headquarters has expanded multiple times since its establishment.

== Emblem ==
The World War I Victory Button on a narrow circular band of blue enamel, containing the words "American Legion" in gold letters, forms the central element of the American Legion Emblem. The Legion emblem or "button" was officially adopted by the National Executive Committee of The American Legion on July 9, 1919.

== Eligibility ==
Membership in the American Legion was originally restricted to soldiers, sailors, and marines who served honorably between April 6, 1917, and November 11, 1918. Eligibility has since been expanded to include personnel who served on active duty in the Armed Forces of the United States or armed forces associated with the U.S., between December 7, 1941, through a date of cessation of hostilities as determined by the federal government, and was an American citizen when they entered that service or continues to serve honorably. U.S. Merchant Mariners who served between December 7, 1941, and December 31, 1946, are also eligible. Honorary, associate, social, or guest memberships in the Legion are not permitted. Members must be eligible through the nature and timing of their military service.

The following is a list of eligibility dates the American Legion uses to determine membership eligibility.

Eligibility dates

War era	Start date	End date
World War I	April 6, 1917	November 11, 1918
World War II – present	December 7, 1941	Open

== Publication ==
The official publication, originally known as The American Legion Weekly, launched on July 4, 1919. In 1926, The Legion Weekly reduced the frequency of publication and was renamed The American Legion Monthly. In 1936, the publication's name and volume numbering system changed again, this time to The American Legion.

The American Legion Digital Archive online offers scans of "American Legion magazine, national meeting digests, newsletters, press releases, and other publications published by the national organization."

== See also ==
- American Legion v. American Humanist Association
- Centralia massacre (Washington)
- Forty and Eight
- LAPD Red Squad raid on John Reed Club art show
- Frederick C. Painton
- Freedom Bell, American Legion
- List of American Legion buildings
- List of notable members of the American Legion
- List of veterans' organizations
