= Joyce Fulweiler =

American politician

Member of New Hampshire House of Representatives for Merrimack 3
- In office December 5, 2018 – December 1, 2020
- Preceded by: Ryan Smith
- Succeeded by: Kenna Cross

Personal details
- Party: Democratic

Joyce May Fulweiler is an American politician. She was a member of the New Hampshire House of Representatives.
