= Scott Scarborough =

Former president of the University of Akron

Scott L. Scarborough was president of the University of Akron from 2014 to 2016. At the beginning of his tenure, the University of Akron was heavily in debt after his predecessor's 15-year-tenure, which had seen major, expensive expansions. During his tenure, he sought to overcome this debt, but his decisions led to major opposition from the university community, and he resigned after only two years in the position.

Prior to joining the University of Akron Scarborough was provost of the University of Toledo in Toledo, Ohio, and before that he had multiple business and academic administration positions.

After Scarborough over took the University of Akron in July 2014, in an attempt to reduce spending, there were major layoffs of staff, including most of the university's press, and the intercollegiate baseball team was disbanded. The university sought to rebrand itself as "Ohio's Polytechnic University," initially considering an attempt to change the name. The rebranding process often involved expensive advertising, and Scarborough at times made comments that outraged the several other presidents of universities in northeast Ohio.

In a move some felt was an attempt to raise tuition in violation of Ohio legislative action on the matter, Scarborough imposed at $50 a credit-hour fee for upper-level classes. At the same time, introductory-level courses were offered at lower prices in a way suggesting they were a better value than community college courses, a move that alienated the leaders of regional community colleges.

Scarborough was also heavily criticized for cutting much of the academic success department in the university and then trying to outsource student counseling to a new start up company in Akron.

Under Scarborough's leadership, the University of Akron founded a Center for Data Science, Analytics and Information Technology. It also established the Experiential Learning Center for Entrepreneurship and Civic Engagement.

At the same time, the university president's residence was refurbished for about $375,000.

The end of Scarborough's tenure came as he involved the University of Akron in talks with ITT-Tech to become the center of a national educational chain. Enrollment for fall of 2016 showed a very steep decline from previous years. This led to Scarborough leaving the presidency on very short notice in June 2016.

Starting in 2016 after stepping down as president of the University of Akron Scarborough became a business professor at that institution. In the summer of 2020 his position was among 178 employee positions planned to be eliminated in an effort to balance the university budget.

== Sources ==
- Seltzer, Rick (June 1, 2016). "Acrimony at Akron". Inside Higher Ed.
- McCafferty, Rachel Abbey (December 15, 2016). "Newsmaker of the Year: Scott L. Scarborough". Crain's Cleveland Business. Crain Communications.
