= Girls Nation =

Civic training program

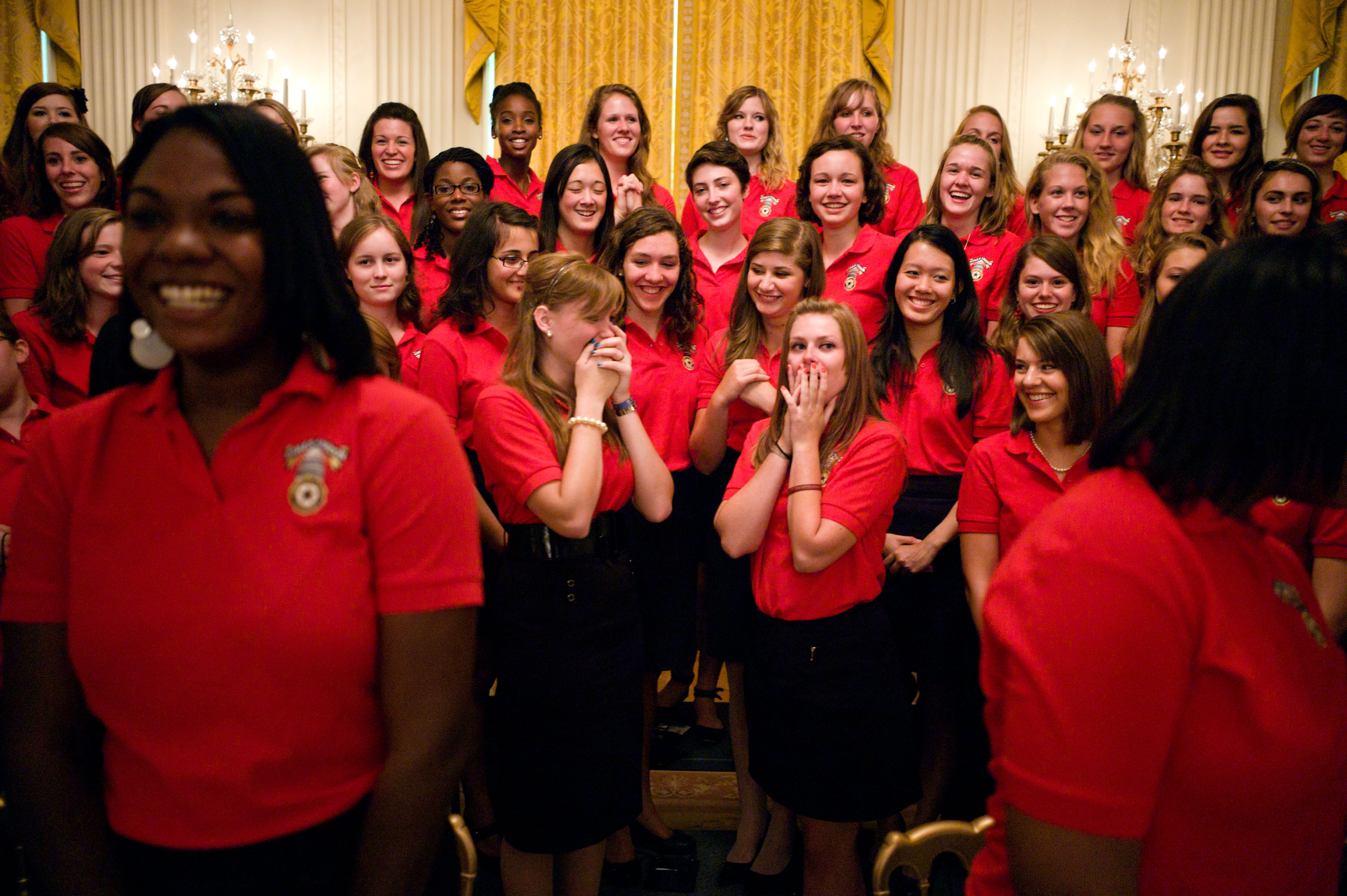
Members of Girls Nation in the White House in 2011

Girls Nation is an annual civic training program run by the American Legion Auxiliary. It is analogous to Boys Nation.

== Notable alumni ==
- Kristen Soltis Anderson
