= Boys Nation =

Annual forum for boys run by the American Legion

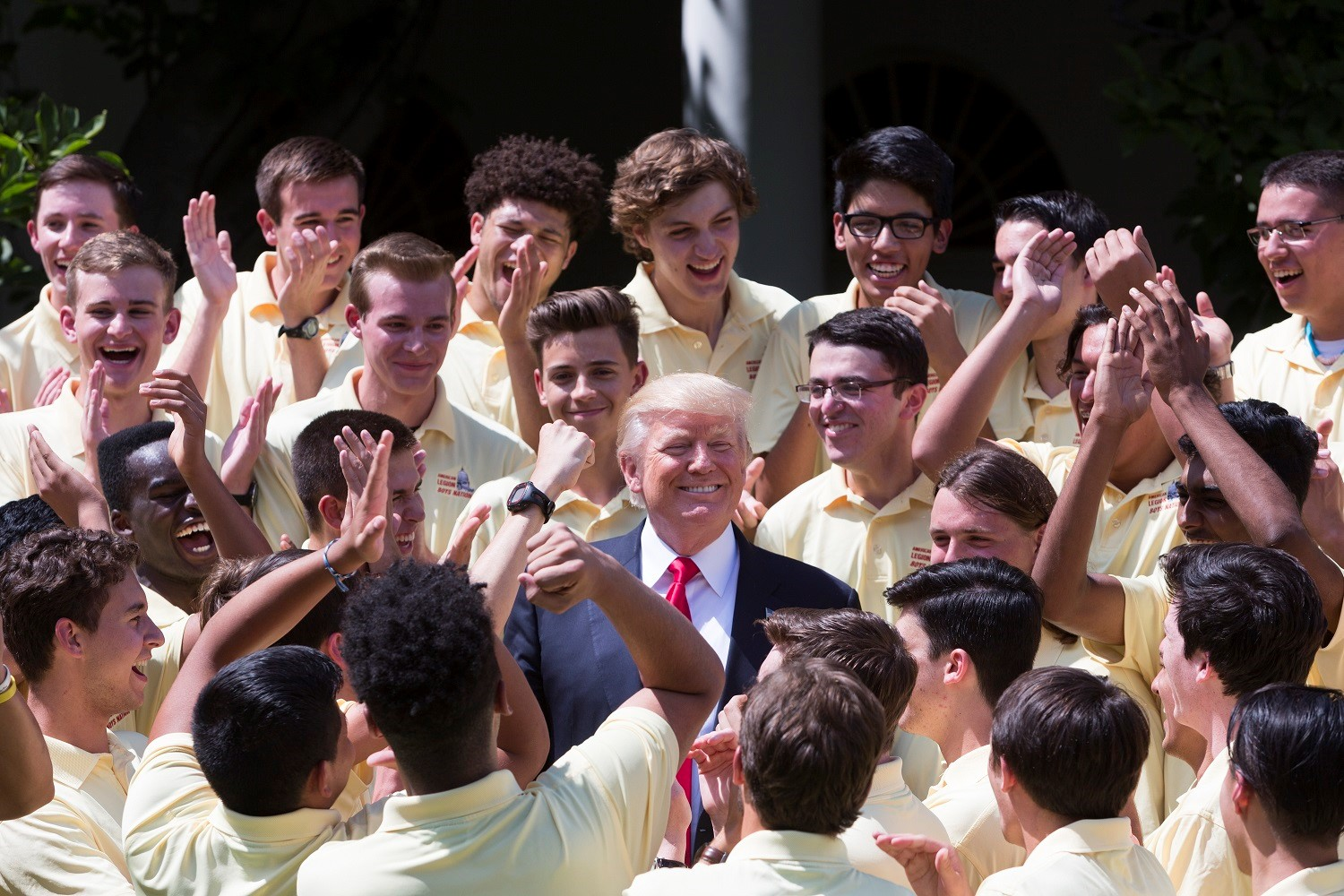
Members of the 2017 Boys Nation meeting with President Donald Trump at the White House

Boys Nation is an annual forum concerning civic training, government, leadership, and Americanism that is run by the American Legion. One hundred Boys Nation Senators are chosen from a pool of over 20,000 Boys State participants, making it one of the most selective educational programs in the United States.

Each year, two delegates in the summer after their junior year of high school are selected from each of the fifty American Legion Boys State programs in the United States (Hawaii does not host a Boys State however Washington DC does). These delegates attend a week-long event in Washington, DC funded by scholarships.

In 2020, the New York Post published an article citing Boys Nation and Boys State as summer camps that groom future presidents and governors.

The event endeavors to teach delegates about the processes of the Federal government of the United States by establishing a mock Senate and organizing mock elections of a Boys Nation Senate President Pro Tempore, Senate Secretary, Vice President, and President. Senators also attend lectures and forums, and visit governmental institutions and historical sites. Tom Brokaw and former president Bill Clinton were previous Boys Nation senators. It is a tradition for the student senators to take a private tour of the White House and be received by the current president. Boys Nation senators also ordinarily receive private tours of the United States Supreme Court, the Congress, the Pentagon, and the State Department, several senators have also met with the incumbent president, including Donald Trump in 2017.

Students assume the role of a United States Senator, representing their respective (Boys) State. They write and introduce bills and debate in the senate chambers. Delegates are divided into two political parties, the Federalists and the Nationalists, where they draft party platforms, nominate candidates for president and vice president, and elect party leadership as part of the legislative simulation. For 2026's session, Sawyer Ray was elected president. Krish Korrapati was elected Vice President.

The American Legion Auxiliary runs a similar event called Girls Nation.

== Notable alumni ==
- David Barlow, United States Attorney, District of Utah
- Max Baucus, United States Ambassador and Senator, Montana
- Beau Biden, Attorney General of Delaware
- Tom Brokaw, Former NBC anchorman
- Steve Bullock, Governor of Montana
- Aneesh Chopra, United States Chief Technology Officer
- Chris Christie, Former Governor of New Jersey
- David Cicilline, United States Representative, Rhode Island
- Bill Clinton, 42nd President of the United States
- Tom Cotton, United States Senator, Arkansas
- Mitch Daniels, Former Governor of Indiana, Current President, Purdue University
- Lawrence DiCara, Attorney, Politician, former Boston City Council President
- H. Alston Johnson III, Former federal judicial nominee to the U.S. Court of Appeals for the Fifth Circuit
- John Neely Kennedy, United States Senator, Louisiana
- Alan Keyes, politician
- Mike Lee, United States Senator, Utah
- Joe Lieberman, United States Senator, Connecticut and VP Candidate
- Donal Logue, film and television actor
- Gray H. Miller, U.S. District Court Judge
- Nate Morris, Entrepreneur
- Eric Motley, Former State Department Official
- Scott Murphy, United States Representative, New York
- Ben Sasse, United States Senator, Nebraska
- Jonathan Shapiro (writer), Emmy Award winning Producer/Writer
- Gaddi Vasquez, Former Director of the Peace Corps
- Scott Walker, 45th Governor of Wisconsin

== See also ==
- Boys State
- Mountaineer Boys State
