= Georgetown =

Georgetown or George Town may refer to:

== Places ==
=== Africa ===
- George, South Africa, formerly known as Georgetown
- Janjanbureh, Gambia, formerly known as Georgetown
- Georgetown, Ascension Island, main settlement of the British territory of Ascension Island

=== Asia ===
- Georgetown, Prayagraj, India
- George Town, Chennai, India
- George Town, Penang, capital city of the Malaysian state of Penang

=== Europe ===
- Georgetown, Blaenau Gwent, now part of the town of Tredegar in Wales
- Georgetown, Dumfries and Galloway, a location in Dumfries and Galloway, Scotland
- Es Castell in Minorca, Spain, originally called Georgetown

=== North America ===
==== Canada ====
- Georgetown, Alberta
- Georgetown, Newfoundland and Labrador
- Georgetown, Ontario
- Georgetown, Prince Edward Island

==== Caribbean ====
- George Town, Bahamas, a village in Exuma District, Bahamas
- George Town, Belize, a village in Stann Creek District, Belize
- George Town, Cayman Islands, the capital city on Grand Cayman
- Georgetown, Saint Vincent and the Grenadines

==== United States ====
- Georgetown, Alaska
- Georgetown, Arkansas
- Georgetown, California
- Georgetown, Colorado
- Georgetown, Connecticut
- Georgetown, Delaware
- Georgetown Hundred, an unincorporated subdivision of Sussex County, Delaware
- Georgetown, Florida
- Georgetown, Chatham County, Georgia, an unincorporated suburb of Savannah
- Georgetown, Dunwoody, Georgia, a neighborhood
- Georgetown, Quitman County, Georgia, an incorporated town and county seat
- Georgetown, Idaho
- Georgetown, Illinois
- Georgetown, Cass County, Indiana
- Georgetown, Floyd County, Indiana
- Georgetown, St. Joseph County, Indiana
- Georgetown, Washington County, Indiana
- Fairview, Kentucky (Christian Co.), formerly known as Georgetown
- Georgetown, Kentucky
- Georgetown, Louisiana
- Georgetown, Maine
- Georgetown, Maryland
- Georgetown (CDP), Maryland
- Georgetown, Massachusetts
- Georgetown Township, Michigan
- Georgetown, Minnesota
- Georgetown Township, Clay County, Minnesota
- Georgetown, Mississippi
- Georgetown, Montana
- Georgetown, New Jersey
- Georgetown, New York, a town in Madison County
- Georgetown, Brooklyn, New York, a neighborhood in New York City
- Georgetown, Ohio (in Brown County)
- Georgetown, Fayette County, Ohio
- Georgetown, Harrison County, Ohio
- Georgetown, Beaver County, Pennsylvania, a borough
- Georgetown, Lancaster County, Pennsylvania
- Georgetown, Luzerne County, Pennsylvania
- Georgetown, South Carolina
- Georgetown, Tennessee
- Georgetown, Texas
- Georgetown, Virginia
- Georgetown, Seattle, Washington
- Georgetown (Washington, D.C.)
- Georgetown, Berkeley County, West Virginia
- Georgetown, Lewis County, West Virginia
- Georgetown, Marshall County, West Virginia
- Georgetown, Monongalia County, West Virginia
- Georgetown, Polk County, Wisconsin
- Georgetown, Price County, Wisconsin

=== South America ===
- Georgetown, Guyana, capital city
  - Georgetown FC, an association football club
- Georgetown, Argentina, a suburb of the city of Córdoba, Argentina

=== Oceania ===
==== Australia ====
- Georgetown, New South Wales
- Georgetown, Queensland, a town in the Shire of Etheridge
- Georgetown, South Australia
- George Town, Tasmania
  - George Town Council, the local government area that contains the town

==== New Zealand ====
- Georgetown, Invercargill, a suburb of Invercargill
- Georgetown, Otago, a locality in the Waitaki Valley

== Transport ==
- Georgetown Airport (disambiguation), various airports
- Georgetown railway station (Scotland), a disused station in Houston, Renfrewshire, Scotland
- Georgetown station (Ontario), a railway station in Georgetown, Ontario, Canada
- Georgetown station (Metro-North), a former, and currently proposed railway station on the New Haven Line's Danbury Branch

== Schools, colleges and universities ==
- Georgetown University, Washington, D.C., United States
  - Georgetown Hoyas, the athletic programs of Georgetown University
  - Georgetown College (Georgetown University), an undergraduate school at Georgetown University
- Georgetown College (Kentucky), United States
- Georgetown Day School, a private K-12 school in Washington, D.C.
- Georgetown Preparatory School, a Catholic boys' school in Bethesda, Maryland
- Georgetown Visitation Preparatory School, a Catholic girls' school in Washington, D.C.
- Horry-Georgetown Technical College, Conway, SC, United States

== Other ==
- Georgetown (film), a 2019 film directed by Christoph Waltz
- "Georgetown", a 2022 song by Loyle Carner featuring John Agard
- "Georgetown" (mixtape), a 2015 mixtape by Fat Trel

== See also ==
- George Towns (disambiguation)
- Georges Township, Fayette County, Pennsylvania
- Georgestown, St. John's
