= Churchville =

Churchville can refer to a location in North America:

== Canada ==
- Churchville, Elgin County, Ontario
- Churchville, Peel Regional Municipality, Ontario

== United States ==
- Churchville, Iowa
- Churchville, Maryland
- Churchville, Michigan
- Churchville, New York
- Churchville, Pennsylvania
- Churchville, Virginia
- Churchville, West Virginia
