= Gaston (disambiguation) =

Gaston is a masculine given name or surname. It may also refer to:

== Places ==
- Gaston, California, an unincorporated community
- Fort Gaston, California, founded in 1859, abandoned in 1892
- Gaston, Indiana, a town
- Gaston, North Carolina, a town
- Gaston County, North Carolina
- Gaston, Oregon, a city
- Gaston, South Carolina, a town
- Gaston, West Virginia, an unincorporated community
- A variant spelling of Gastun, present-day Bagras, a Crusader castle in Turkey
- Gaston (crater), an impact crater on the Moon

== Other uses ==
- Gaston (comics), a Belgian comic strip by André Franquin
- Gaston (climbing), the climbing technique named after Gaston Rébuffat
- Gaston (seal), a brown fur seal that escaped from the Prague Zoo during the 2002 European floods
- Gaston College, a community college in North Carolina
- "Gaston" (song), a song from Disney's Beauty and the Beast
- Tropical Storm Gaston, a number of named tropical cyclones
