= Georgetown, West Virginia =

Georgetown is the name of several unincorporated communities in the U.S. state of West Virginia.

- Georgetown, Berkeley County, West Virginia
- Georgetown, Lewis County, West Virginia
- Georgetown, Marshall County, West Virginia
- Georgetown, Monongalia County, West Virginia
