= Abrams Creek =

Abrams Creek may refer to:

- Abrams Creek (Tennessee), United States
- Abrams Creek (Virginia), United States

== See also ==
- Abrams Run, a stream in West Virginia, United States
- Abram Creek (disambiguation)
