= Gaston =

- Pronunciation: English: /ˈɡæstən/
- Gender: Male

Origin
- Origin: French

Other names
- Related names: Gastão

Gaston is a masculine given name of French origin and a surname. It may refer to:

== People ==
=== Given name ===
- Gaston I of Foix (1287–1315)
- Gaston II of Foix (1308–1343)
- Gaston III of Foix (1331–1391)
- Gaston IV of Foix (1422–1472)
- Gaston I of Béarn (died circa 980)
- Gaston II of Béarn (circa 951 – 1012)
- Gaston III of Béarn (died on or before 1045)
- Gaston IV of Béarn (died 1131)
- Gaston V of Béarn (died 1170)
- Gaston VI of Béarn (1173–1214)
- Gaston VII of Béarn (1225–1290)
- Gaston, Prince of Viana (1444–1470)
- Gaston, Count of Marsan (1721–1743)
- Gaston, Duke of Orléans (1608–1660), French nobleman
- Gastón Acurio (born 1967), Peruvian chef
- Gaston Bachelard (1884–1962), French philosopher
- Gaston Balande (1880–1971), French painter and illustrator
- Gaston Borch (1871–1926), French composer, arranger, conductor, cellist, and author
- Gaston Bouatchidzé (1935–2022), Georgian-French writer and translator
- Gaston Browne (born 1967), Antiguan politician and Prime Minister
- Gaston Bussière (1862–1928 or 1929), French painter and illustrator
- Gaston Caperton (born 1940), American politician
- Gaston Chevrolet (1892–1920), French racecar driver and automobile manufacturer
- Gaston Cornereau (1888–1944), French fencer
- Gaston Couté (1880–1911), French poet and singer
- Gaston, Count of Eu (1842–1922), French prince and military commander
- Gaston de Foix, Count of Candale (1448–1500), French nobleman
- Gastón de Peralta (1510–1587), Spanish nobleman
- Gaston Defferre (1910–1986), French politician
- Gaston Doumergue (1863–1937), French politician and President
- Gaston Alonzo Edwards (1875–1943), American architect, educator
- Gastón Etlis (born 1974), Argentine tennis player
- Gaston Eyskens (1905–1988), Belgian politician and Prime Minister
- Gaston Flosse (born 1931), French Polynesian politician and President
- Gaston Gallimard (1881–1975), French publisher
- Gaston Gambor (1948–2019), Central African basketball player, military officer, and politician
- Gastón Gaudio (born 1978), Argentine tennis player
- Gaston Glock (1929–2023), Austrian engineer
- Gaston Gradis (1889–1968), French businessman and explorer
- Gaston Julia (1893–1978), French mathematician
- Gaston Leroux (1868–1927), French writer
- Gaston Monnerville (1897–1991), French politician
- Gaston Moore (born 1945), Canadian politician
- Gaston Moore (American football) (born 2002), American football player
- Gaston Michel (1856–1921), French actor
- Gaston Nguérékata (born 1953), Central African mathematician
- Gaston Palewski (1901–1984), French politician
- Gaston Paris (1839–1903), French writer
- Gastón Ramírez (born 1990), Uruguayan footballer
- Gaston Rébuffat (1921–1985), French alpinist
- Gaston Salmon (1878–1917), Belgian Olympic champion fencer
- Gastón Solnicki (born 1978), Argentine film director
- Gaston Tarry (1843–1913), French mathematician
- Gaston Thorn (1928–2007), Luxembourg politician and Prime Minister
- Gaston Tong Sang (born 1949), French Polynesian politician and President
- Gaston Tschirren (1906–1983), Swiss footballer

=== Surname ===
- A. G. Gaston (1892–1996), American businessman
- Bill Gaston (born 1953), Canadian writer
- Cito Gaston (born 1944), American baseball player and manager
- Donald Gaston (1934–2013), American professional wrestler
- Fannie Gaston-Johansson (1938–2023), American professor of nursing
- Hugo Gaston (born 2000), French tennis player
- Iñaki Gastón (born 1963), Spanish cyclist
- Isis Gaston (born 2000), American rapper known as Ice Spice
- Joe Gaston (politician) (1926–2018), British politician
- Joseph P. Gaston (1833–1913), American railroad executive
- Justin Gaston (born 1988), American singer-songwriter and actor
- Lloyd Gaston (1929–2006), Canadian theologian and professor
- Mack C. Gaston (born 1940), Admiral United States Navy, First Black Admiral NTC Great Lakes, member of the Secretary of the Navy's Advisory Subcommittee on Naval History
- Marilyn Gaston (born 1939), American physician
- Michael Gaston (born 1962), American actor
- Nicola Gaston (born 1980), New Zealand scientist
- Victor Gaston (born 1943), American politician
- William Gaston (1778–1844), American politician and jurist
- William Gaston (Massachusetts politician) (1820–1894), American politician
- William H. Gaston (1840–1927), American landowner
- Yves Gaston (1806–1863), French-Filipino businessman

== Fictional characters ==
- Gaston Lagaffe, character in the Gaston comics by André Franquin
- Gaston, character in Colette's 1944 novella Gigi
- Gaston, the main antagonist in the 1991 film Beauty and the Beast and its 2017 remake
- Gaston the Ladybird, a character in Ben & Holly's Little Kingdom
- Gaston, one of the main characters from the Alphonse and Gaston comic strip
- Gaston, a rabbit villager in the video game series Animal Crossing

== See also ==
- Gaston (disambiguation)
