= Abrams Run =

Stream in West Virginia, USA

Abrams Run Tributary to West Fork River
- Location of Abrams Run mouth Abrams Run (the United States)

Location
- Country: United States
- State: West Virginia
- County: Lewis

Physical characteristics
- Source: Big Run divide
  - location: west of Haytack Knob
  - coordinates: 38°50′16″N 080°28′50″W
  - elevation: 1,250 ft (380 m)
- Mouth: West Fork River
  - location: Emmart, West Virginia
  - coordinates: 38°52′43″N 080°28′42″W
  - elevation: 1,073 ft (327 m)
- Length: 2.42 mi (3.89 km)
- Basin size: 3.04 square miles (7.9 km^{2})
- Discharge
  - location: West Fork River
  - average: 5.80 cu ft/s (0.164 m^{3}/s) at mouth with West Fork River

Basin features
- Progression: West Fork River → Monongahela River → Ohio River → Mississippi River → Gulf of Mexico
- River system: Ohio River
- Tributaries
  - left: unnamed tributaries
  - right: unnamed tributaries
- Bridges: WV 46 (Abrams Run Road) (x3)

Abrams Run is a stream in the U.S. state of West Virginia; sharing the name of Abram Bennett, a pioneer who settled there.

== Variant names ==
According to the Geographic Names Information System, it has also been known historically as:

- Abram's Run

== Course ==
Abrams Run rises west of Haytack Knob, in Lewis County, West Virginia and then flows generally northeast to join the West Fork River at Emmart.

== Watershed ==
Abrams Run drains 3.04 square miles (7.9 km^{2}) of area, receives about 49.3 in/year of precipitation, has a wetness index of 284.52, and is about 78% forested.

== See also ==
- List of rivers of West Virginia
