= Roanoke, West Virginia =

- Unincorporated community
- Location within the state of West Virginia Roanoke (the United States)
- Coordinates: 38°55′54″N 80°29′34″W
- Country: United States
- State: West Virginia
- County: Lewis
- Time zone: UTC-5 (Eastern (EST))
  - Summer (DST): UTC-4 (EDT)

Roanoke is an unincorporated community in southern Lewis County, West Virginia, United States. Most of the original town is located under 60 feet (18 m) of Stonewall Jackson Lake's water. A display at the Stonewall Resort State Park's lodge tells the story of the flood-plagued town that was purchased in the 1980s by the United States Army Corps of Engineers. The flood control dam at Stonewall Jackson Lake went into service in 1988. According to the U.S. Geological Survey, Roanoke has also been known as "Bush Mills", "Bushs Mills", "Roanville", and "Roanville Station".

The community was named after Roanoke, Virginia.
