= Lightburn =

Lightburn may refer to:

- Lightburn, Glasgow
- Lightburn, an area of Halfway, South Lanarkshire, Scotland
- Lightburn, West Virginia
- Lightburn & Co, Australian manufacturer of concrete mixers, washing machines and the Zeta automobile
- Murray Lightburn, Canadian singer/songwriter
