= Joseph Andrew Jackson Lightburn =

American farmer, soldier, and minister

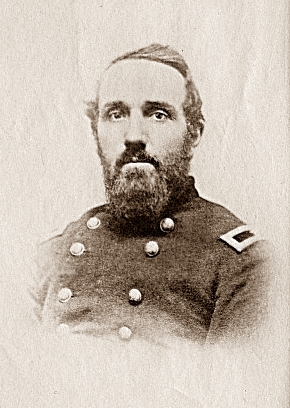
- Brig. Gen. Joseph Andrew Jackson Lightburn, ca. 1864
- Born: September 21, 1824; Webster, Pennsylvania, US
- Died: May 17, 1901 (aged 76); Broad Run, West Virginia, US
- Burial place: Broad Run Baptist Church Cemetery, Lightburn, West Virginia
- Military career
- Allegiance: United States of America; Union
- Branch: United States Army; Union Army
- Service years: 1846-1851; 1861-1865
- Rank: Brigadier General
- Commands: 4th West Virginia Volunteer Infantry
- Conflicts: Mexican–American War; American Civil War: Battle of Rich Mountain; Battle of Charleston; Siege of Vicksburg; Battles for Chattanooga; Battle of Resaca; Battle of Dallas; Battle of Kennesaw Mountain; Battle of Atlanta; Battle of Ezra Church
- Other work: Baptist minister, farmer

Joseph Andrew Jackson Lightburn (September 21, 1824 – May 17, 1901) was a West Virginia farmer, soldier and Baptist Minister, most famous for his service as a Union general during the American Civil War.

== Early life ==
Lightburn was born in Pennsylvania, the oldest of 5 children. His family moved to Lewis County, Virginia (now West Virginia) and worked on his family's farm, where he spent the rest of his childhood. He became friends with Thomas J. Jackson (later known as General "Stonewall" Jackson), whose home was only a few miles away. The Lightburn family freely lent young Jackson books from their large library and took him to church. The two were lifelong friends. He enlisted in the U.S. Army and fought in the Mexican War; serving until 1851 when he was discharged as Sergeant. In 1859 he became a licensed minister in the Baptist church. On August 8, 1874 Rev. J. A. J. Lightburn met with the First Baptist Church in Weston, WV and accepted the call as pastor.

== Civil War ==
When the Civil War began Lightburn was appointed colonel of the 4th (West) Virginia Infantry Regiment on August 14, 1861. Two of his brothers, Martin Van Buren Lightburn and Calvin Luther Lightburn, also joined this regiment and served with their older brother throughout the war. Another brother, John Fell Lightburn, joined the Confederate Army instead. Joseph Lightburn's regiment served under Maj. Gen. George B. McClellan during the West Virginia Campaign early in the war. For much of 1862 he commanded the 4th Brigade in the District of Kanawha. In the Kanawha Valley Campaign of 1862, he was forced to evacuate the Kanawha Valley in the face of Confederate General William W. Loring, but helped drive these same Confederates out of the valley during Jacob D. Cox's operations in West Virginia.

On March 14, 1863, Lightburn was appointed brigadier general of volunteers and ordered to report to the Army of the Tennessee. He arrived in January 1863 but shortly after went on a leave of absence and returned to his home in West Virginia. During this time Confederate generals William E. "Grumble" Jones and John D. Imboden conducted a raid through the area and Lightburn was enlisted to raise troops to fend off the raid. Returning to the Army of the Tennessee he assumed command of the 2nd Brigade, 2nd Division, XV Corps on May 23 just after the siege of Vicksburg had begun and led the brigade throughout the rest of the siege and following expedition against Jackson, Mississippi. Afterward he was temporarily in command of the 2nd Division of the XV Corps.

In November 1863 the XV Corps was transferred from Vicksburg to Chattanooga. Returning to command of his brigade, Lightburn fought under Maj. Gen. William T. Sherman in the battle of Missionary Ridge. When Sherman's attacks against Tunnel Hill failed, he sent in 200 men commanded by Lightburn to attack the position. This attack fared no better than Sherman's earlier attacks.

Lightburn led his brigade during the Atlanta campaign, seeing action at the battles of Resaca, Dallas and Kennesaw Mountain. During the Battle of Atlanta Lightburn rose to command the 2nd Division after the death of army commander James B. McPherson and all of Lightburn's superior officers rose in command also. When Oliver O. Howard was chosen as permanent commander of the Army of the Tennessee, Lightburn returned to command of the 2nd Brigade and fought at the battle of Ezra Church. During the following siege of Atlanta, he was engaged in light skirmishing and was shot in the head. The bullet merely grazed his skull but knocked him from his horse falling into the arms of his brother, Calvin Luther. The wound ended his career with the Army of the Tennessee and he was sent home to recover. Upon recovery he first commanded a brigade then the 2nd Division in the Department of West Virginia until he resigned from the army on June 22, 1865.

== Postbellum life ==
After the war, General Lightburn spent the remainder of his life as a Baptist minister, most notably serving at the Broad Run Baptist Church. He was also active in the Masonic fraternity and served as the first master of Jackson Lodge No. 35 in Jane Lew for five years, ending in 1872.

Lightburn died in Broad Run, West Virginia, and was buried in the churchyard of the Broad Run Baptist Church. He is the namesake of Lightburn, West Virginia.

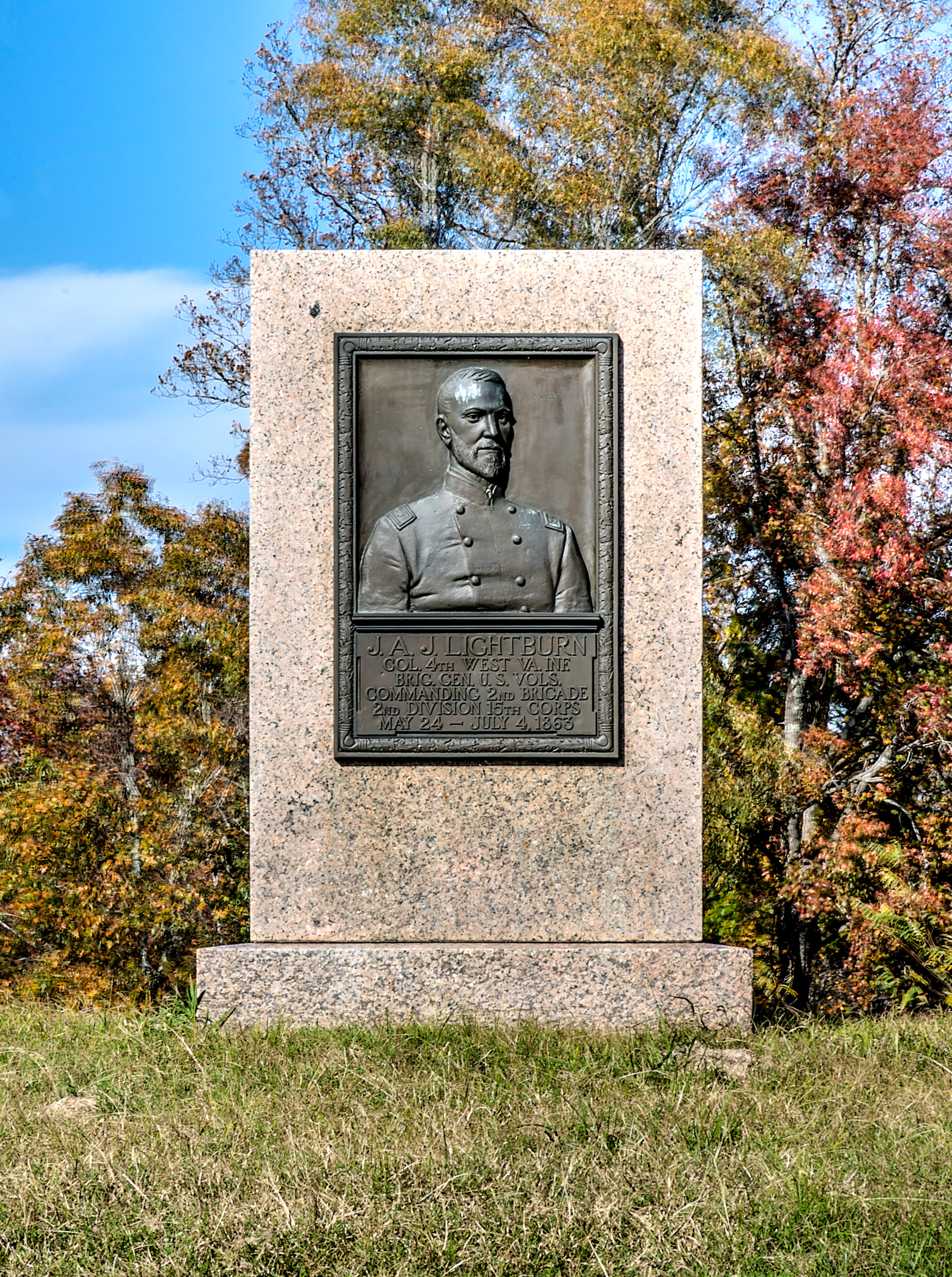
Relief portrait of Lightburn at Vicksburg National Military Park.

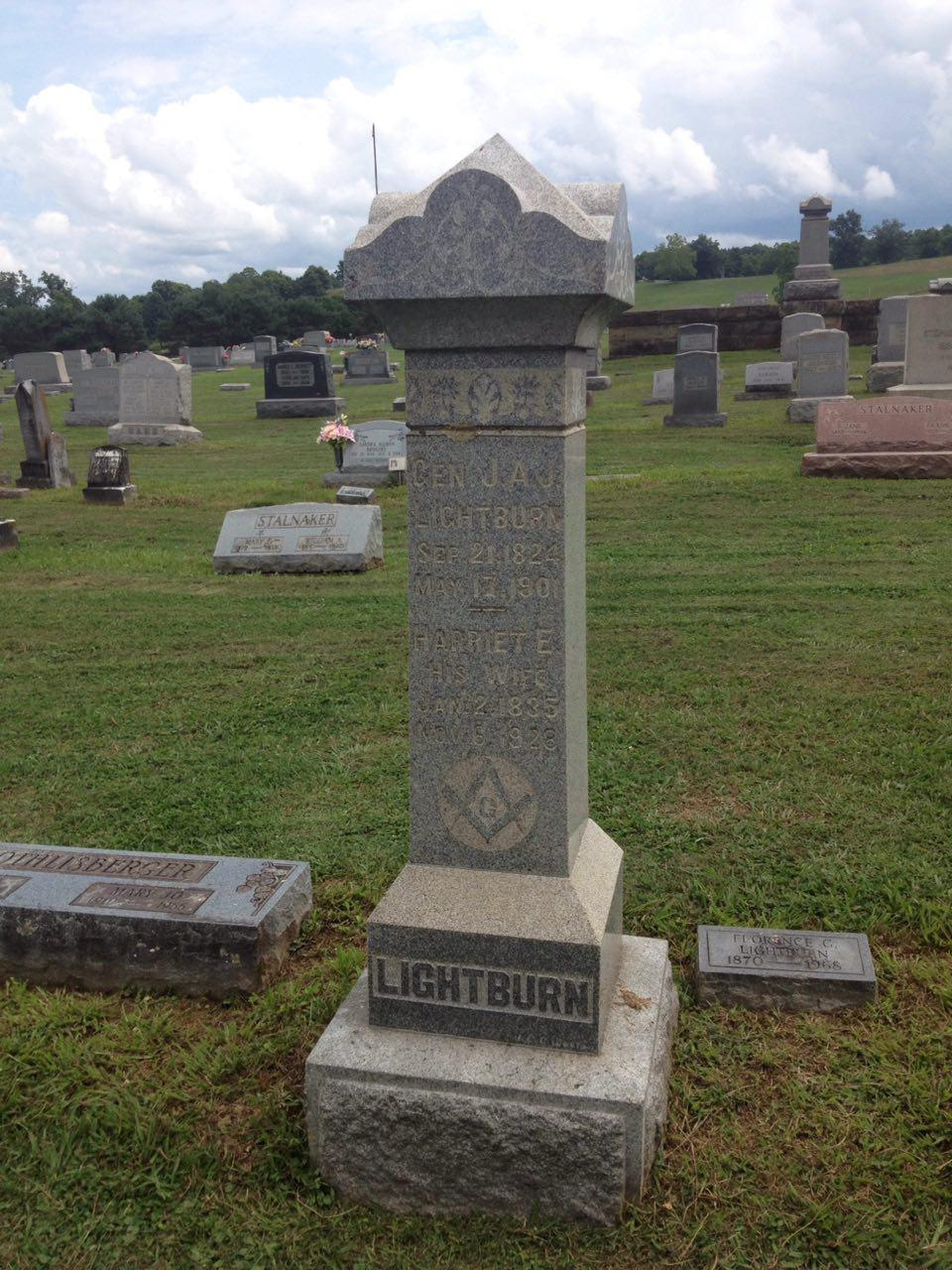
Grave of Joseph Lightburn at Broad Run Baptist Church Cemetery near Lightburn, West Virginia.

== See also ==
- List of American Civil War generals (Union)
