= Freemansburg =

Freemansburg may refer to the following places in the United States:

- Freemansburg, Pennsylvania
- Freemansburg, West Virginia
