= Abram Creek =

Abram Creek may refer to various places in the United States:

- Abram Creek (Ohio), a tributary of the Rocky River in Cuyahoga County, Ohio
- Abram Creek (West Virginia), a tributary of the North Branch Potomac River in Grant and Mineral counties, West Virginia
- Abram Branch, a stream which feeds Jackson Swamp in Robeson County, North Carolina
- Abrahams Creek, a tributary of the Susquehanna River in Luzerne County, Pennsylvania

== See also ==
- Abrams Creek (disambiguation)
