= Bennett Run =

Stream in Lewis County, West Virginia, U.S.

Coordinates: 38°52′10″N 80°28′05″W

Bennett Run is a stream located entirely within Lewis County, West Virginia.

Bennett Run was named for William Bennett, a pioneer settler.

== See also ==
- List of rivers of West Virginia
