= Lewis County Schools =

Lewis County Schools may refer to several school districts in the United States:

- Lewis County Schools (Kentucky)
- Lewis County Schools (West Virginia)
