= Kitsonville, West Virginia =

- Unincorporated community
- Location within the state of West Virginia Kitsonville (the United States)
- Coordinates: 39°1′57″N 80°28′25″W
- Country: United States
- State: West Virginia
- County: Lewis
- Elevation: 1,033 ft (315 m)
- Time zone: UTC-5 (Eastern (EST))
  - Summer (DST): UTC-4 (EDT)
- GNIS ID: 1554891

Kitsonville is an unincorporated community in Lewis County, West Virginia, United States.

The community most likely was named after the local Kitson family.
