= Berlin, West Virginia =

Unincorporated community in West Virginia, United States

- Unincorporated community
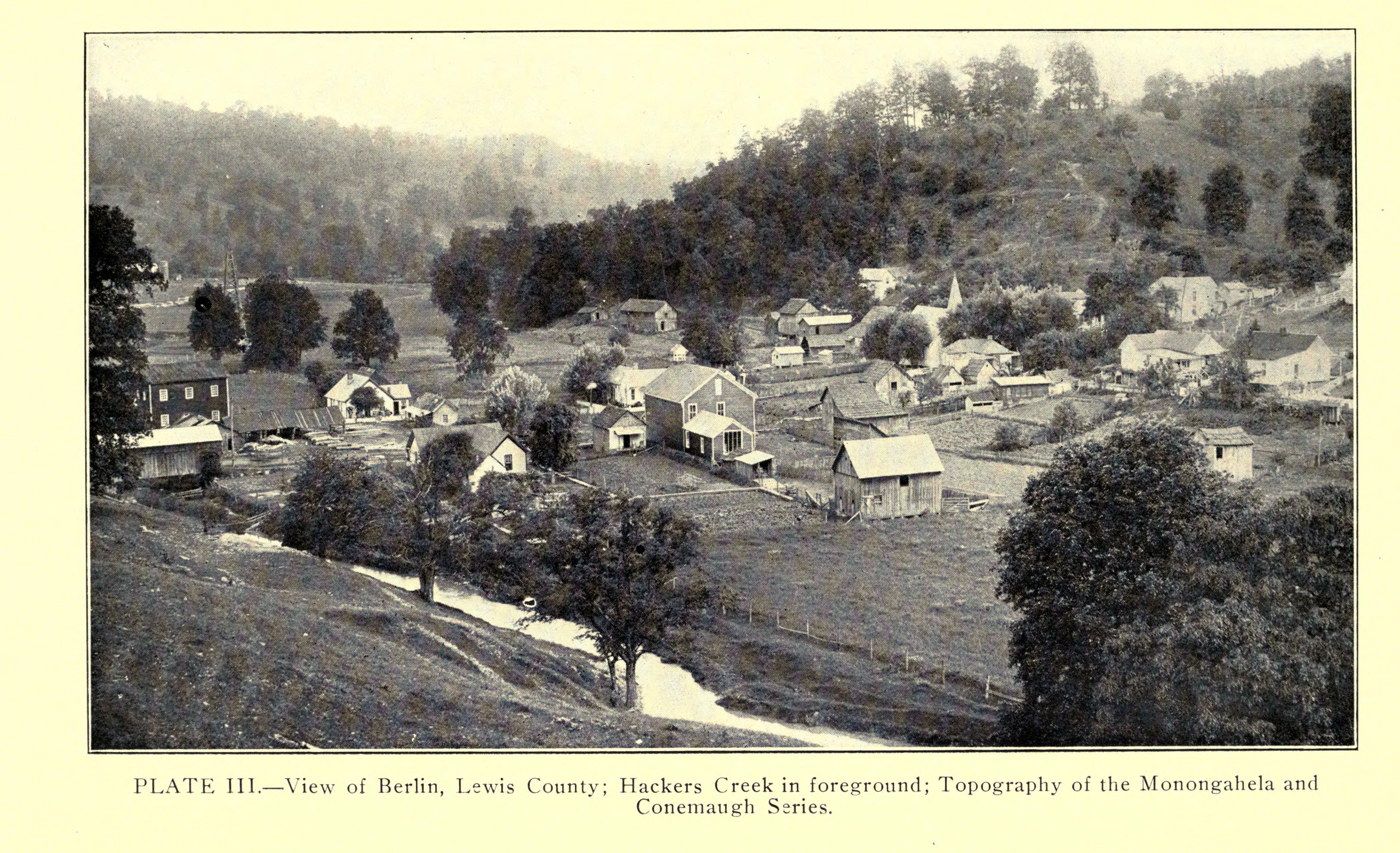
- Berlin and Hackers Creek, 1916

- Location within the state of West Virginia Berlin (the United States)
- Coordinates: 39°3′9″N 80°21′18″W
- Country: United States
- State: West Virginia
- County: Lewis
- Time zone: UTC-5 (Eastern (EST))
  - Summer (DST): UTC-4 (EDT)
- GNIS feature ID: 1535657

Berlin is an unincorporated community in Lewis County, West Virginia, United States, along Hackers Creek.

== Notable people ==
- Lucullus Virgil McWhorter, author
