= Georgetown, Maryland =

Georgetown, Maryland may refer to:

- Georgetown (CDP), Maryland, a census-designated place in western Kent County
- Georgetown, northeastern Kent County, Maryland, an unincorporated community in northeastern Kent County
- Georgetown (Washington, D.C.), a former town in Maryland which became part of the District of Columbia upon its creation
