= Turnertown, West Virginia =

- Unincorporated community
- Location within the state of West Virginia Turnertown (the United States)
- Coordinates: 39°04′28″N 80°27′54″W
- Country: United States
- State: West Virginia
- County: Lewis
- Elevation: 1,027 ft (313 m)
- Time zone: UTC-5 (Eastern (EST))
  - Summer (DST): UTC-4 (EDT)
- GNIS feature ID: 1555840

Turnertown is an unincorporated community in Lewis County, West Virginia, United States.
