= Cox Town, West Virginia =

Unincorporated community in West Virginia, United States

- Unincorporated community
- Location within the state of West Virginia Cox Town (the United States)
- Coordinates: 39°1′40″N 80°28′30″W
- Country: United States
- State: West Virginia
- County: Lewis
- Elevation: 1,050 ft (320 m)
- Time zone: UTC-5 (Eastern (EST))
  - Summer (DST): UTC-4 (EDT)
- GNIS ID: 1554211

Cox Town is an unincorporated community in Lewis County, West Virginia, United States.
