= Orlando, West Virginia =

Unincorporated community in West Virginia, US

Coordinates: 38°52′16″N 80°35′37″W

Orlando is an unincorporated community located in Braxton and Lewis counties, West Virginia, United States. It is located on Oil Creek, a tributary of the Little Kanawha River.

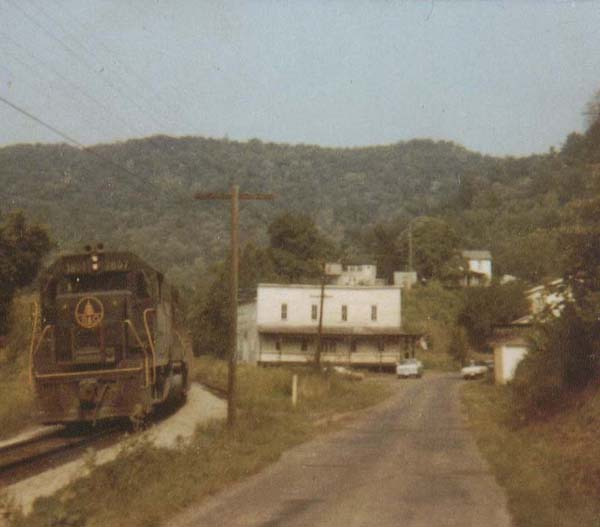
The Warehouse in Orlando with an eastbound B&O Train, photographed in the 1960s

== History ==
The first settlers came to Oil Creek's wilderness in the early decades of the 19th century from Virginia and Maryland, many from the area of the South Branch of the Potomac River. The pioneer settlers included the Posey/Skinner, Williams/Blake/Ocheltree, Riffle, and Conrad families, among others.

During the Civil War the area of Oil Creek and Clover Fork was almost entirely Confederate. Many young men joined the Confederate Army, other residents supported the Confederate cause in less official ways.

By the late 19th century, several farming communities had developed in the Oil Creek watershed, including Blake, Peterson, Posey Run, and others. The community that would become Orlando was named Confluence, as it was located at the confluence of two major tributaries, Three Lick and Clover Fork, with Oil Creek. These little communities in Oil Creek’s watershed tended to include a one room school, one or two churches, and perhaps a general store, blacksmith and/or grist mill.

In the late 19th century the Coal and Coke and then the Baltimore and Ohio railroad lines were built and they crossed near the community of Confluence. The community of Confluence became a sizable and prosperous town. In 1917 Confluence’s name was changed to Orlando for reasons that remain unclear. The town of Orlando flourished in the early 20th century, until train routes changed.

From the early 19th century until the mid-20th century, most of the land was devoted to family farming and farming for profit. Major industries have included lumbering, livestock, natural gas and oil production, railroad maintenance and hospitality.

== Today ==
Because of damming projects in the late 20th century, Orlando today, surprisingly, sits in the center of West Virginia’s Lake District situated between the Stonewall Jackson and Burnsville recreation areas. Most of the farming land is being returned to forest. The community is still populated by the descendants of the original settlers of the region.

Orlando has two churches, Baptist and United Methodist, and a post office. Landmarks include the white frame Methodist Church built in 1873. the Warehouse, a white frame structure built about 1907 to house a produce business, and the red brick church built by the Roman Catholic parish of St. Michael in 1917 and today home of the thriving Baptist congregation.
