= George Towns =

George Towns may refer to:

- George W. Towns (1801–1854), United States lawyer, legislator, and politician
- George Towns (rower) (1869–1961), Australian single sculls world champion

== See also ==
- Georgetown (disambiguation)
