= Bennett, West Virginia =

Unincorporated community in West Virginia, United States

- Unincorporated community
- Location within the state of West Virginia Bennett (the United States)
- Coordinates: 38°53′28″N 80°33′55″W
- Country: United States
- State: West Virginia
- County: Lewis
- Elevation: 807 ft (246 m)
- Time zone: UTC-5 (Eastern (EST))
  - Summer (DST): UTC-4 (EDT)
- GNIS ID: 1549589

Bennett is an unincorporated community in Lewis County, West Virginia, United States.
