= Valley Chapel, West Virginia =

- Unincorporated community
- Location within West Virginia Location within the United States
- Coordinates: 39°06′35″N 80°29′40″W
- Country: United States
- State: West Virginia
- County: Lewis
- Elevation: 1,017 ft (310 m)
- Time zone: UTC-5 (Eastern (EST))
  - Summer (DST): UTC-4 (EDT)
- Area codes: 304 & 681
- GNIS feature ID: 1728692

Valley Chapel is an unincorporated community in Lewis County, West Virginia, United States. Valley Chapel is located along County Route 10, 5.15 miles (8.29 km) north-northwest of Weston. Valley Chapel had a post office, which closed on January 24, 1998.

The community was named after the nearby Valley Chapel church.
