= Jacksonville, West Virginia =

- Unincorporated community
- Location within the state of West Virginia Jacksonville (the United States)
- Coordinates: 38°53′27″N 80°29′31″W
- Country: United States
- State: West Virginia
- County: Lewis
- Time zone: UTC-5 (Eastern (EST))
  - Summer (DST): UTC-4 (EDT)

Jacksonville is an unincorporated community in Lewis County, West Virginia, United States. Its altitude is 1,079 feet (329 m), and it is located at 38°53′27″N 80°29′31″W (38.8909305, -80.4920339).

The community was named after George (or Edward) Jackson, the original owner of the town site.
