= Gaston, California =

Unincorporated community in California, United States

Gaston
- Unincorporated community
- Location in California Gaston (the United States)
- Coordinates: 39°23′39″N 120°44′30″W
- Country: United States
- State: California
- County: Nevada County
- Elevation: 5,062 ft (1,543 m)

Gaston is the site of a former mining community in Nevada County, California. Gaston lies at an elevation of 5062 feet (1543 m) on the Gaston Ridge. The Gaston Ridge historically, was often referred to as God's Country, because of its wild and somewhat inaccessible beauty. Gaston is located 3.25 miles (5.2 km) south of Graniteville and about 4 miles northeast of the town of Washington. It is near the intersection of what are now Gaston and Hoosier Roads, in the Tahoe National Forest.

After the gold in the surface gravels in the area was largely worked out, hard rock gold mining began in 1856 when J. J. Meachum, Titicum and others established the California mine. The mine proved profitable. McKee & Henderson erected a nearby mill which reportedly crushed 15,000 tons of rock before it burned down in 1863. The crushed rock yielded 8 to 9 dollars a ton in gold. Alongside mining, a thriving lumbering industry developed, and a number of sawmills were erected.

The rough and tumble of mining camp life surfaced quickly in Gaston, when one partner in a mining venture killed the other, and not over gold. One newspaper described the killing as follows: "On Sunday evening last a man named [Valentine] Brand was murdered by Wm. [or Warren] Myers, at Gaston Ridge in Eureka township. The difficulty grew out of a foot- race in which Myers was one of the runners and Brand acted as judge. The decision was given against Myers, who became offended and quarreled with Brand. Myers then left and arming himself with a rifle, returned and deliberately shot Brand through the body, inflicting a wound from the effects of which he died the next day. Myers was immediately taken into custody". A jury convicted Myers of only second degree murder, apparently out of a concern that Myers may not have been sane.

Over the years, the California mine was generally profitable and was regularly expanded. An ample supply of water was insured by the arrival of the North Bloomfield ditch in 1870. By 1897, an estimated $600,000 in gold, at then prices, had been produced. Still, the mine changed hands several times, in the process becoming known as the Gaston Mine. In 1898, the mine was acquired by the Gaston Gold Mining Company, based in San Francisco. Initially well financed, that company invested in new equipment and substantially upgraded operations. Employment increased from 20 men in 1898 to 50 men in 1900 and 90 men in early 1907. With the increase in mining operations and employment, a town blossomed around the mine. The population was recorded as about 200 in 1900. There was stage service initially to the town of Washington, and later daily service to Nevada City. By 1904, the town boasted two stores, a hotel, a saloon, a hardware store, a post office, a water system, a fire company and a school. Electric lights arrived that year, and joined a telephone line to Nevada City. Soon, a group of Italian immigrants arrived to work in the mine creating a "New Town" below the "Old Town". Many of the Italians were employed to cut wood and produce charcoal for use in the mine's forges.

The post office was established in 1899. Mary Harmon was its first postmaster and the first female postmaster in Nevada County. Ellen Whitaker was appointed postmaster in 1904. The post office was discontinued in 1913.

There were other mines around the Gaston Ridge, such as the Baltic, Ethel and Erie Mines, but the principal gold producer in the area was the Gaston Mine. Between 1899 and 1907, the mine produced about $1 million in gold at then prices. The mine was shut down temporarily in 1907, a result of the severe winter, and a shortage of capital attributed to the cost of drilling the long tunnel and the aftermath of the San Francisco earthquake. It reopened in 1909, and operated intermittently for the next few years. In 1916, it became the first mine in Nevada County to install the new Hardinge Mill, which improved the gold extraction process. The mine closed during World War I, because of a shortage of labor and supplies needed for the war effort. There was intermittent mining after the war. By the 1940s, the last remaining building was in shambles. After World War II, the area was heavily logged. Today, nothing readily visible remains of Gaston. Gannett may have confused Gaston with Fort Gaston, located in northwestern California, and named after a Lt. Gaston killed during an Indian skirmish.
