= Stonewall Jackson Lake State Park =

State park in Lewis County, West Virginia

- IUCN category III (natural monument or feature)
- Entrance sign for Stonewall Resort along U.S. Route 19.

- Location within West Virginia
- Location: Lewis, West Virginia, United States
- Coordinates: 38°56′59″N 80°29′34″W
- Area: 1,736 acres (7.03 km^{2})
- Elevation: 1,093 ft (333 m)
- Established: 1990
- Named for: Stonewall Jackson Lake
- Governing body: West Virginia Division of Natural Resources
- Operator: Benchmark Hospitality International
- Website: wvstateparks.com/park/stonewall-resort-state-park/

Stonewall Jackson Lake State Park is a state park along the shores of Stonewall Jackson Lake, an impoundment on the West Fork River in the U.S. state of West Virginia. The lake is a project of the United States Army Corps of Engineers. The original park was completed in 1990 and consisted of a campground, marina, multi-purpose building, and park offices. The revenues generated from park activities were not able to support the debt from construction activities. Senator Robert C. Byrd developed a legislation that meant the State would not have to pay the Corps the $28 million debt if improvements to the State Park exceeded $28 million.

The state chose to venture with the private firm, McCabe-Henley Properties of Charleston. McCabe-Henley, through a bond-issuing agency, sold $44 million in bonds to private markets and investors. This provided a sum of $54 million ($10 million from the State and $44 million from investors), which has been used to build the resort. McCabe-Henley selected management company Benchmark Hospitality International to manage the State Park and Resort. For marketing purposes, the resort is referred to as Stonewall Resort and Stonewall Resort State Park despite the legal name of the park still being Stonewall Jackson Lake State Park.

The resort is located in Lewis County, West Virginia, about 10 miles (16 km) south of Weston and about three miles (5 km) off the Roanoke Exit (Exit 91) of Interstate 79.

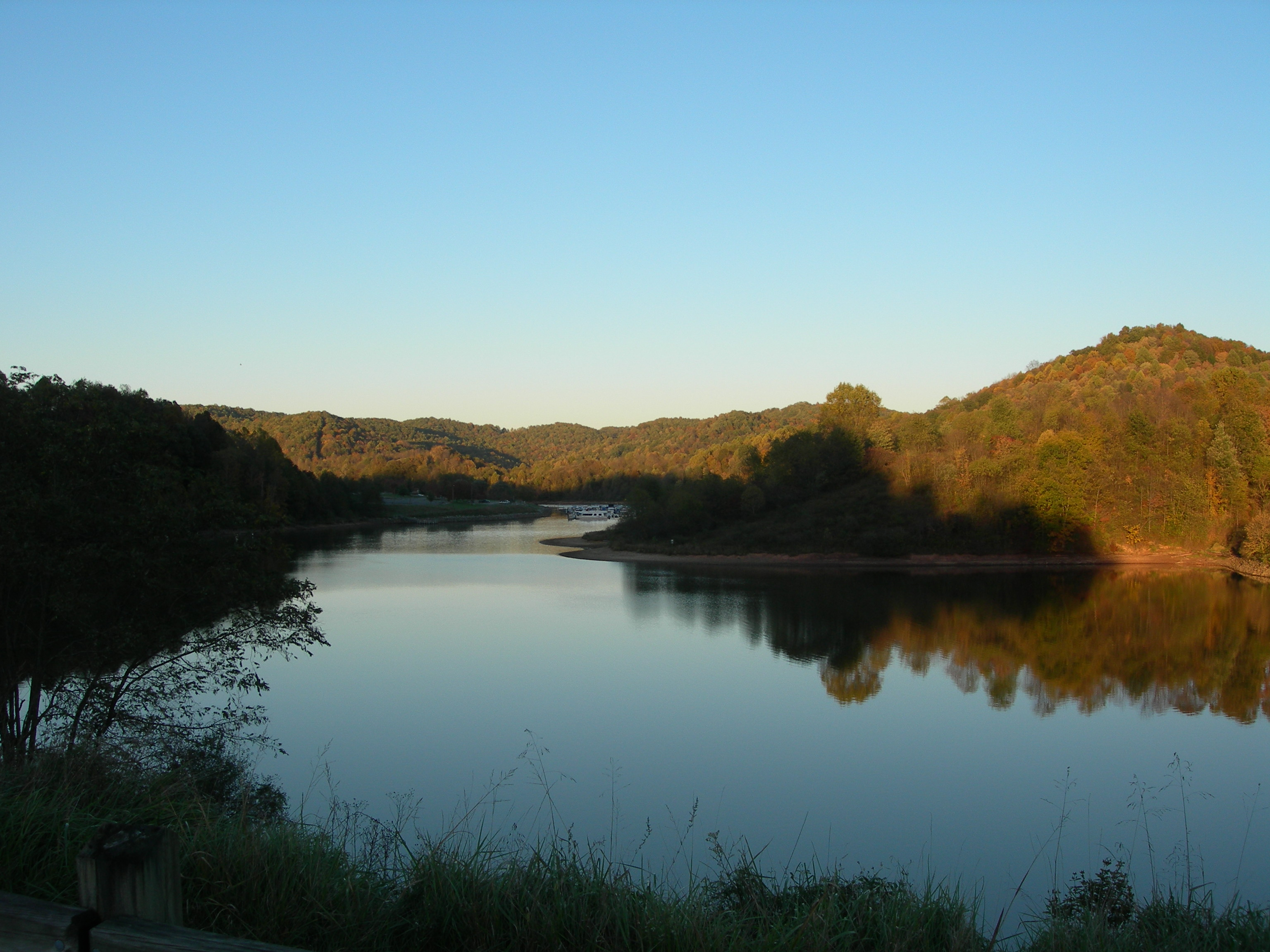
Stonewall Jackson Lake

== Features ==
- 3 restaurants: Stillwaters, TJ Muskies, and Lightburns
- 18 hole Signature Arnold Palmer Golf Course
- golf driving range
- 16 conference rooms (15,000 sq ft. total)
- full-service spa
- fitness center
- hiking and mountain biking trails
- indoor swimming pool
- outdoor swimming pool
- fishing and boating in Stonewall Jackson Lake
- marina (with boat launch and rentals)
- 125 passenger cruise boat
- 18 cottages
- 191 guest rooms and suites
- 40 campsites
- All Commons areas Wireless Enabled, high speed wired available in room
- Cell Phone repeater system for entire lodge

== Awards ==
- Winner of AAA Four Diamond Award 2004-2008
- "America's Best - Top 100 Resort Courses" 2006, 2007, 2008 - Golfweek
- "America's Best - 2005 Top 40 Best New Courses " - #8 - Golfweek
- "America's Best New Courses - 2003" - #2 - Golf Digest
- "Top Ten You Can Play - 2002" - Golf Magazine
- "Best New Course in 2002" - Seed Research Company

== See also ==
- Roanoke, West Virginia
- List of West Virginia state parks
