= Stonewall Jackson Lake =

Lake of the United States of America

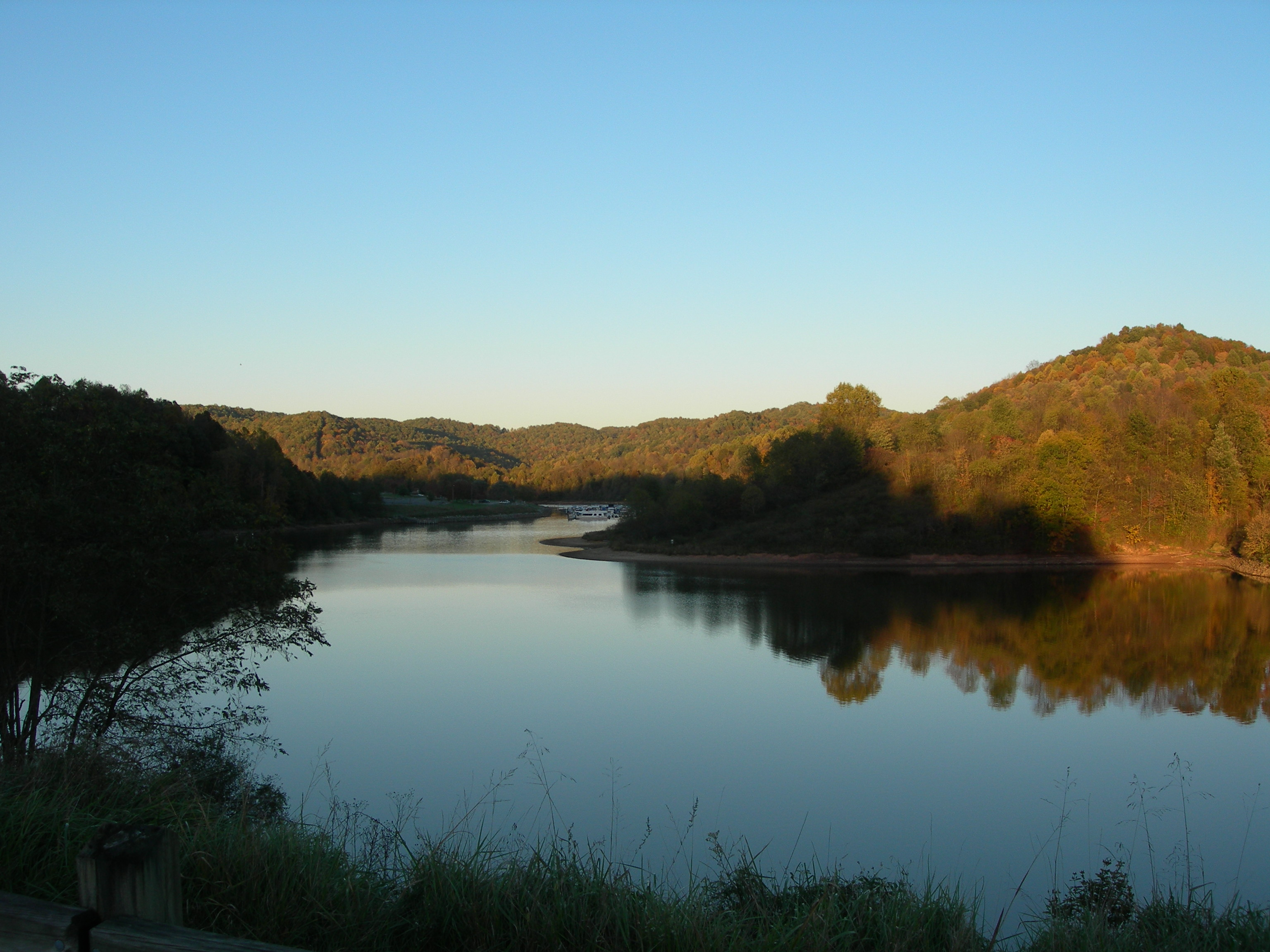

- Location within West Virginia
- Location: Lewis County, West Virginia
- Coordinates: 39°00′12″N 80°28′26″W
- Primary inflows: West Fork River
- Primary outflows: West Fork River
- Basin countries: United States
- Surface area: 2,630 acres (1,060 ha)
- Surface elevation: 1,073 ft (327 m)

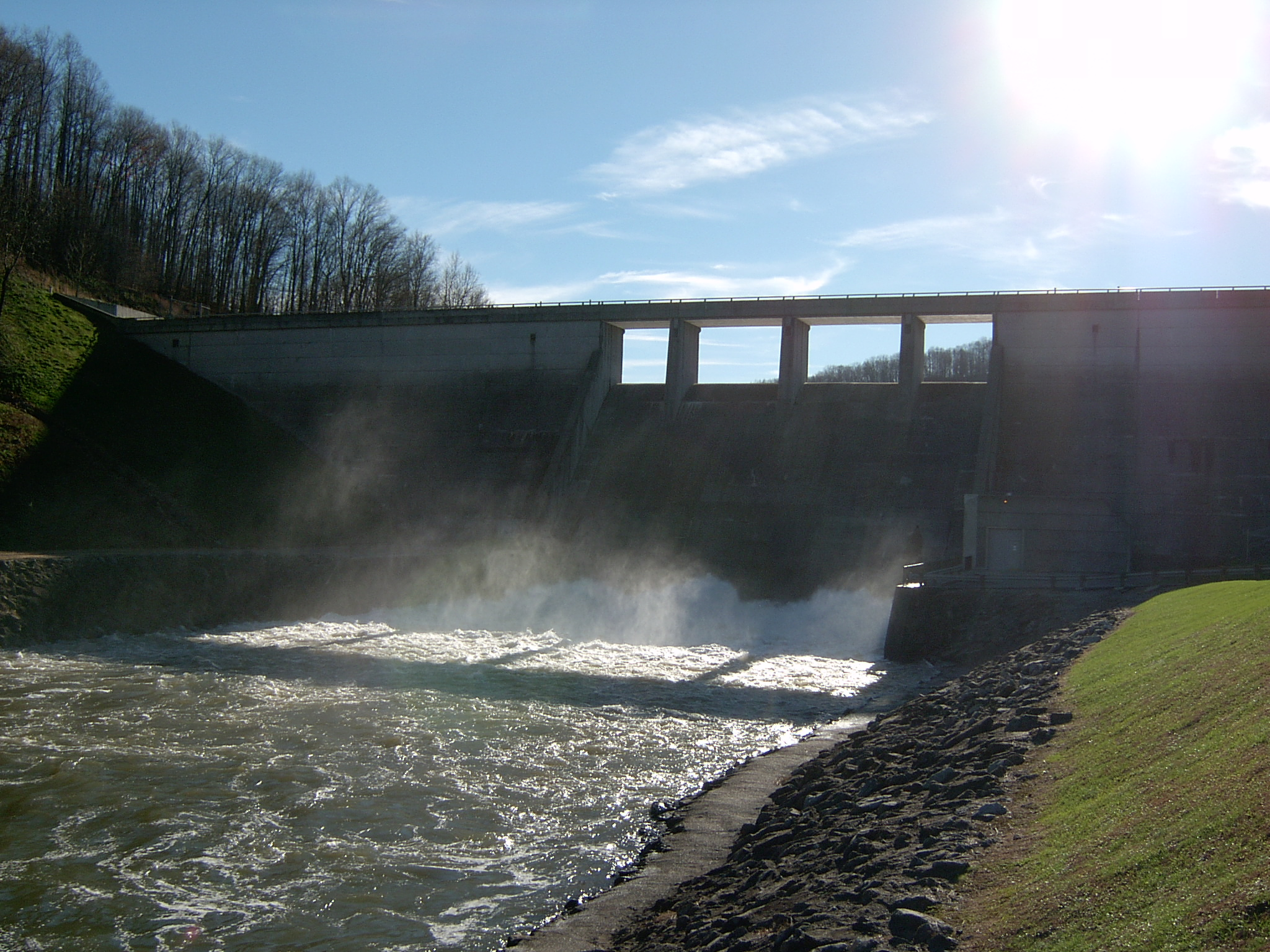
Stonewall Jackson Dam on the West Fork River near Weston, West Virginia in 2003.

Stonewall Jackson Lake is an 2,630-acre (10.6 km^{2}) impoundment on the West Fork River in Lewis County, West Virginia. The lake is a flood control project of the Pittsburgh District of the United States Army Corps of Engineers and named for Thomas "Stonewall" Jackson, a native of Lewis County. Stonewall Resort is located along the lake's shore. Facilities provided by the Corps of Engineers included a visitors center with public restrooms, a hiking trail, and fishing access.

Downstream towns and cities protected by the lake include Weston, Clarksburg, Shinnston, and Fairmont, all in West Virginia

The lake is a popular spot for largemouth bass fishing. A list of fishing species in the lake include:

- Crappie
- Walleye
- Bluegill
- Yellow perch
- Muskellunge
- Channel catfish
- Bullhead
- Carp

Trout is stocked in the lake's tailwaters.

== See also ==
- List of lakes of West Virginia
