= Churchville, West Virginia =

Unincorporated community in West Virginia, United States

- Unincorporated community
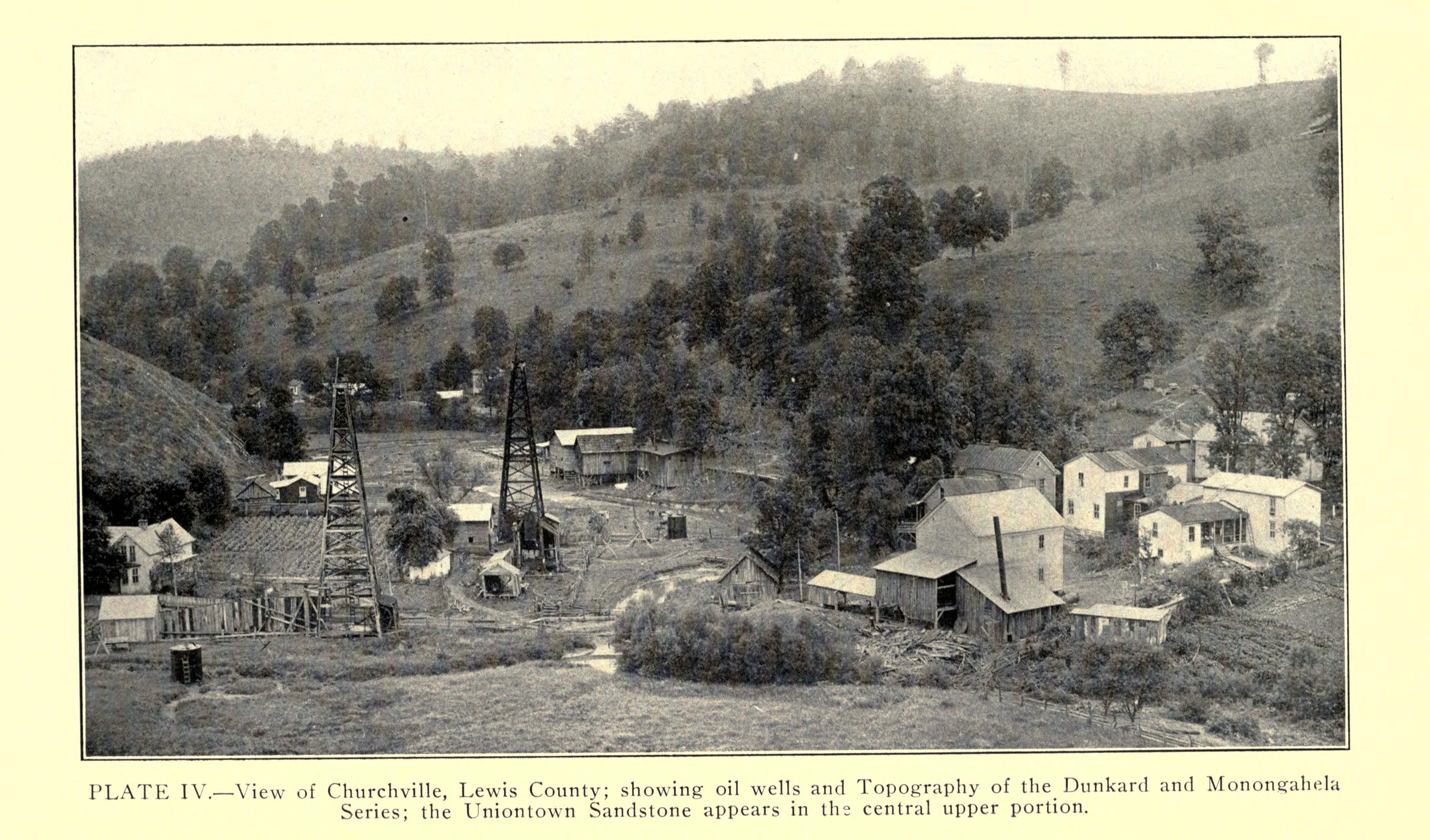
- Churchville circa 1916

- Location within the state of West Virginia Churchville (the United States)
- Coordinates: 39°5′50″N 80°35′29″W
- Country: United States
- State: West Virginia
- County: Lewis
- Elevation: 942 ft (287 m)
- Time zone: UTC-5 (Eastern (EST))
  - Summer (DST): UTC-4 (EDT)
- GNIS ID: 1537340

Churchville is an unincorporated community in Lewis County, West Virginia, United States.

Churchville was so named on account of the churches near the town site.
