= Emmart, West Virginia =

Unincorporated community in West Virginia, United States

- Unincorporated community
- Location within the state of West Virginia Emmart (the United States)
- Coordinates: 38°52′59″N 80°28′25″W
- Country: United States
- State: West Virginia
- County: Lewis
- Elevation: 1,079 ft (329 m)
- Time zone: UTC-5 (Eastern (EST))
  - Summer (DST): UTC-4 (EDT)
- GNIS ID: 1554400

Emmart is an unincorporated community in Lewis County, West Virginia, United States.
