= Georgetown Airport =

Georgetown Airport, or George Town Airport, may refer to:

== Asia ==
- Penang International Airport (IATA: PEN), George Town, Penang, Malaysia

== North America ==
=== Caribbean ===
- Owen Roberts International Airport (IATA: GCM), George Town, Cayman Islands
- Maurice Bishop International Airport (IATA: GND), St. Georges, Grenada
- Exuma International Airport (IATA: GGT), main airport serving George Town, Exuma, Bahamas
- George Town Airport (ICAO: MYEG), George Town, Exuma, Bahamas

=== United States ===
- Delaware Coastal Airport (IATA: GED), Georgetown, Delaware, United States
- Georgetown Airport (California) (FAA: E36), Georgetown, California, United States
- Georgetown-Scott County Airport (FAA: 27K), Georgetown, Kentucky, United States
- Georgetown Municipal Airport (ICAO: KGTU), Georgetown, Texas, United States

== South America ==
- Cheddi Jagan International Airport (IATA: GEO), main airport serving Georgetown, Guyana
- Eugene F. Correia International Airport (IATA: OGL), Georgetown, Guyana

== Oceania ==
- Georgetown Airport (Queensland) (IATA: GTT), Georgetown, Queensland, Australia
- George Town Aerodrome (IATA: GEE), George Town, Tasmania, Australia
