= Lewis County Schools (West Virginia) =

School District in West Virginia, USA

Location
- Lewis County, West Virginia; United States

District information
- Type: Public School District
- Superintendent: Dr. Robin Lewis

Other information
- Website: Lewis County Schools

Lewis County Schools is the operating school district within Lewis County, West Virginia. It is governed by the Lewis County Board of Education, located in Weston.

== Schools ==
=== High school ===
- Lewis County High School

=== Middle school ===
- Robert L. Bland Middle School

=== Elementary schools ===
- Leading Creek Elementary School
- Jane Lew Elementary School
- Peterson-Central Elementary School
- Roanoke Elementary School

== Controversies ==
In 2006, the West Virginia Human Rights Commission investigated charges that a preschool teacher at Peterson-Central Elementary School, used a biracial child as a lesson prop and told schoolmates that the child had been adopted. Joseph Mace, superintendent of Lewis County schools, refused to return phone calls and e-mails from The Associated Press, but acknowledged the incident to a local television station.

== Board of education ==
The Lewis County Board of Education is governed by five elected members who serve a four-year term in office. As of 2023, the Board of Education consists of the following elected members:

Name	Position
Phyllis Hinterer	President
Adam Gissy	Vice-President
Mike Holden	Member
Kenny Lowther	Member
David Bush	Member
