= Churchville, Brampton =

Churchville
- Preserved hamlet Neighbourhood
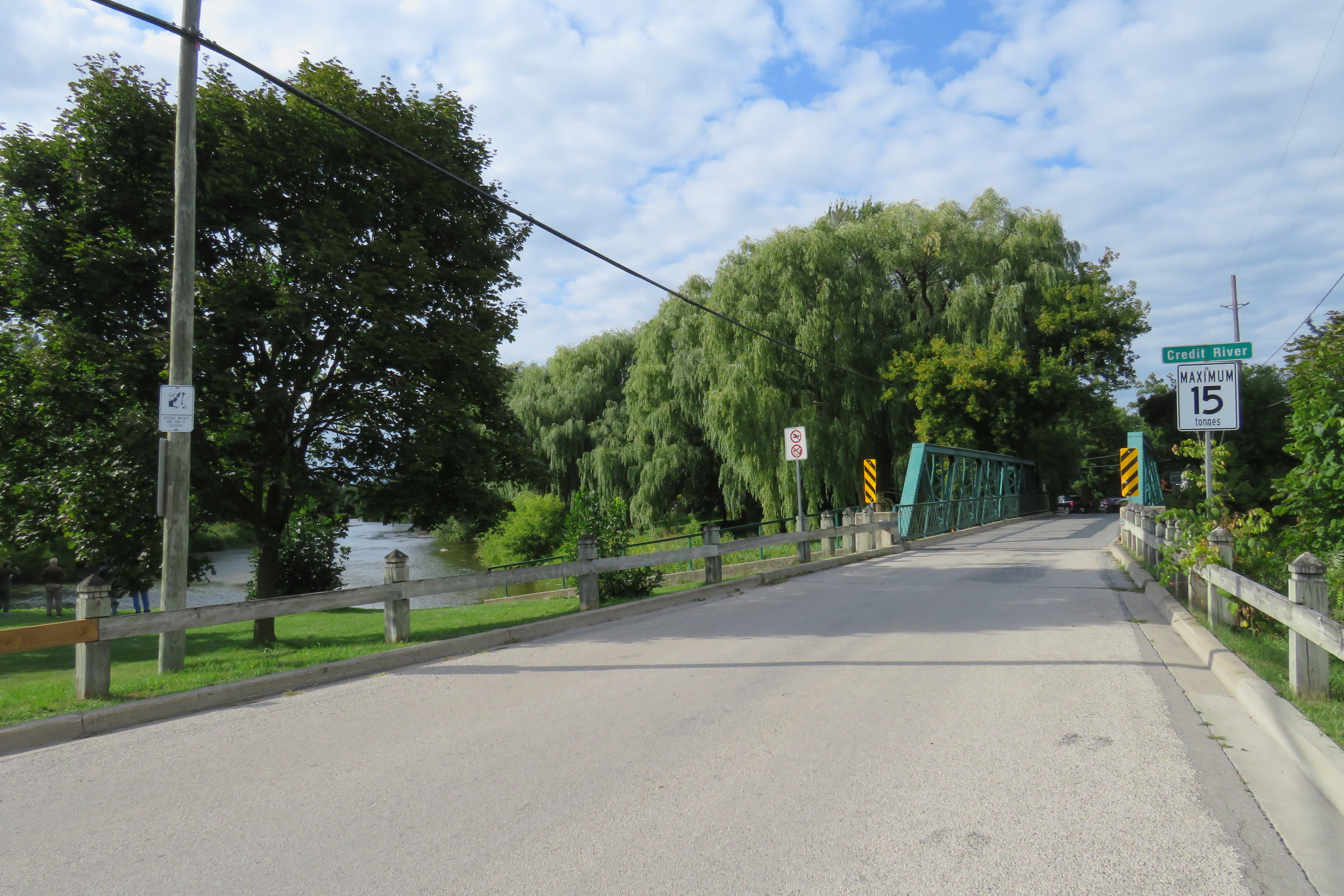
- Old single-lane bridge in Churchville carrying Churchville Road over the Credit River
- Interactive map of Churchville
- Coordinates: 43°37′48″N 79°45′20″W
- Country: Canada
- Province: Ontario
- Regional municipality: Peel
- City: Brampton
- Founded: 1815
- Forward sortation area: List of L postal codes of Canada
- NTS Map: 030M12
- GNBC Code: FAQWC

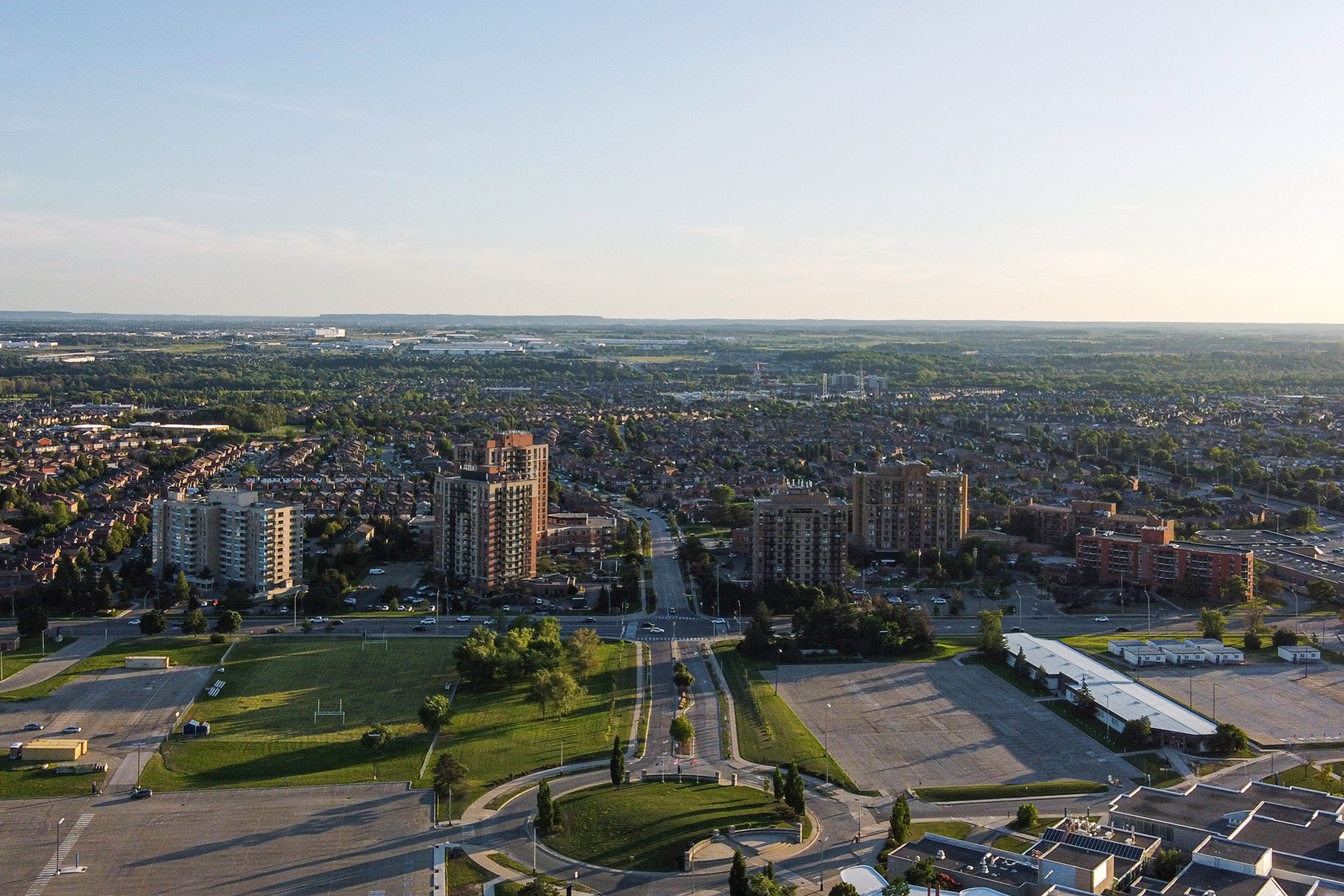
Aerial view of the suburban area surrounding Churchville

Churchville is a preserved suburban hamlet in the southwestern area of Brampton, Ontario, Canada. The village was designated as a heritage conservation district under the Ontario Heritage Act in 1990, making it Brampton's only heritage conservation district.

== History ==
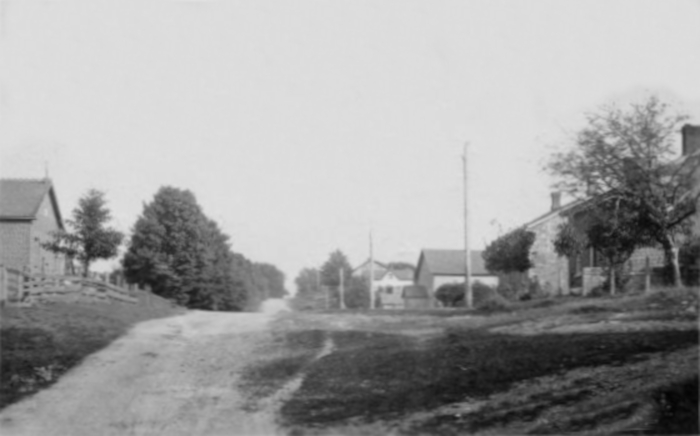
Churchville, circa 1910

Churchville was founded in 1815 by Amaziah Church (1766–1831), who built a gristmill on the Credit River in what was then Toronto Township, York County (Peel County was created from York County in 1851). This small area surrounding the mill on the floodplain of the river valley was where the original settlement was focused.

Over the course of its history, the village grew to include homes, a slaughterhouse, a tannery, a school house, a wooden sidewalk, several churches and small hotels and a cemetery. Many of these structures no longer exist, although some houses have survived from Churchville's early period, and are designated heritage houses.

Churchville, along with the northern extremities of Mississauga (which Toronto Township was restructured into in 1967), were amalgamated into the enlarged City of Brampton on 1 January 1974 as part of the restructuring of Peel County into the Regional Municipality of Peel.

In 2022, flooding occurred due to an ice jam, which damaged around 50 homes. The mayor, Patrick Brown visited the community, and around 100 homes were evacuated. The city has spent CA$345,000 studying the flood.
