= Georgetown, Lewis County, West Virginia =

Unincorporated community in West Virginia, United States

- Unincorporated community
- Location within the state of West Virginia Georgetown (the United States)
- Coordinates: 38°57′38″N 80°23′04″W
- Country: United States
- State: West Virginia
- County: Lewis
- Elevation: 1,096 ft (334 m)
- Time zone: UTC-5 (Eastern (EST))
  - Summer (DST): UTC-4 (EDT)
- GNIS feature ID: 1549698

Georgetown is an unincorporated community in Lewis County, West Virginia, United States. It is adjacent to Stonewall Resort State Park.
