= Lloyd Gaston =

Canadian theologian (1929–2006)

- Born: 2 December 1929; Morgantown, West Virginia
- Died: 24 September 2006 (aged 76)
- Occupation: Biblical scholar

Academic background
- Education: Doctor of Theology
- Alma mater: University of Basel

Academic work
- Discipline: New Testament scholar
- Sub-discipline: Pauline research
- Institutions: United Theological Seminary of the Twin Cities; Vancouver School of Theology
- Main interests: Theology, New Testament
- Notable works: Paul and the Torah

Lloyd Henry Gaston (2 December 1929 – 24 September 2006) was a Canadian theologian, Protestant biblical scholar, associate professor, and professor emeritus of New Testament at Vancouver School of Theology, Vancouver, British Columbia, Canada. He also was a president of the Canadian Society of Biblical Studies and Pastor of United Presbyterian Church in the United States of America.

== Biography ==
Gaston was born in Mongatown, West Virginia. He was ordained in the United Presbyterian Church in the United States of America, in 1961, and served as Pastor of First Presbyterian Church, Hamburg, New Jersey, till 1963. He married Suzanne Gaston.

=== Education ===
Gaston graduated from the Horace Mann School at New York City. In 1952 Gaston studied at Dartmouth College and earned his B.A. summa cum laude with distinction in Philosophy, and he was a member of Delta Upsilon fraternity. He graduated Phi Beta Kappa in 1952 after taking a year off to study in France and Switzerland. He served two years in the U.S. Army and then pursued graduate studies at the University of Basel, Switzerland. With his dissertation No stone on another: studies in the significance of the fall of Jerusalem in the synoptic gospels, in 1967 Gaston earned his ThD summa cum laude at the University of Basel, Switzerland, in New Testament. He also studied at Ulpan Ezion, Jerusalem, in 1970.

== Academic work ==
=== Teaching ===
Gaston had a 40-year academic career. From 1963 to 1973 he taught at the Department of Religion, Macalester College in St. Paul, Minnesota, and during this time he earned his ThD at the University of Basel. From 1973 he was visiting professor of New Testament at United Theological Seminary of the Twin Cities. After Gaston taught in these colleges, in 1973 Gaston was called, and from 1973 to 1978 Gaston was associate professor of New Testament at Vancouver School of Theology. From 1978, Gaston was Professor of New Testament at Vancouver School of Theology until his retirement in 1995, where he became emeritus professor. As professor emeritus, he continued teaching.

=== Canadian Society of Biblical Studies ===
From 1986 to 87 Gaston was president of the Canadian Society of Biblical Studies CSBS (or Société Canadienne des Études Bibliques SCÉB).

== Works ==
=== Thesis ===
- Lloyd Gaston (1967). No stone on another: studies in the significance of the fall of Jerusalem in the synoptic gospels (Diss. Theol. Basel). OCLC 999591193.

=== Books ===
- Lloyd Gaston (1970). No stone on another; studies in the significance of the fall of Jerusalem in the synoptic gospels. Supplements to Novum Testamentum. Vol. 23. Leiden: Brill. OCLC 100648.
- Lloyd Gaston (1970). No stone on another. E.J. Brill. OCLC 1056570407.
- Lloyd Gaston (1973). Horae synopticae electronicae; word statistics of the Synoptic Gospels. Sources for biblical study. Vol. 3. Missoula, Mont.: Society of Biblical Literature. ISBN 9780884140238. OCLC 947637.
- Lloyd Gaston; James M Lindenberger (1975). Marriage and the Biblical style. Vancouver School of Theology. OCLC 42965615.
- Lloyd Gaston (1977). Readings in New Testament Greek. Vancouver, B.C.: Vancouver School of Theology. OCLC 43469065.
- Lloyd Gaston (1984). Legicide and the problem of Christian Old Testament, then and today. OCLC 16841954.
- Lloyd Gaston (1987). Paul and the Torah. Vancouver: University of British Columbia Press. ISBN 9780774803755. OCLC 16713018.
- Lloyd Gaston (1987). Paul and the law : the apostle to the gentiles and the torah of Israel. OCLC 233686330.
- Lloyd Gaston (1990). Paul and the Torah: the apostle to the gentiles and the Torah of Israel. Vancouver, BC: Crane Library. OCLC 1033214301.
- Lloyd Gaston (2 May 1995). Jesus and Paul after Auschwitz : [a lecture]. Occasional paper (Vancouver School of Theology). Vol. 5. Vancouver: Vancouver School of Theology. ISBN 9781895018080. OCLC 233996484.
- Lloyd Gaston (1996). Jesus and Paul after Auschwitz: a lecture. Occasional paper (Vancouver School of Theology). Vol. 5. Vancouver School of Theology. ISBN 9781895018080. OCLC 35969916.
- Lloyd Gaston (1996). Jesus and Paul after Auschwitz. Occasional paper (Vancouver School of Theology). Vancouver School of Theology. ISBN 9781895018080. OCLC 1016245914.
- Lloyd Gaston. Sermons. OCLC 926203587.
- Lloyd Gaston (2000). Writings and speech in Israelite and ancient near eastern prophecy. SBL symposium series. Vol. 10. Missoula, Mont: Society of Biblical Literature. ISBN 9780884140238. OCLC 1027564555.
