= Freemansburg, West Virginia =

Unincorporated community in West Virginia, United States

- Unincorporated community
- Location within the state of West Virginia Freemansburg (the United States)
- Coordinates: 39°5′20″N 80°31′44″W
- Country: United States
- State: West Virginia
- County: Lewis
- Elevation: 1,047 ft (319 m)
- Time zone: UTC-5 (Eastern (EST))
  - Summer (DST): UTC-4 (EDT)
- GNIS ID: 1554508

Freemansburg is an unincorporated community in Lewis County, West Virginia, United States.

== History ==
The place was originally called 'Tobetown' after a slave named Tobe who worked at a blacksmith. After the Civil War and the establishment of a post office, the community was named after the local Freeman family.

On November 17, 1901, a fire burned down several businesses and the post office.
