= Abram Creek (Ohio) =

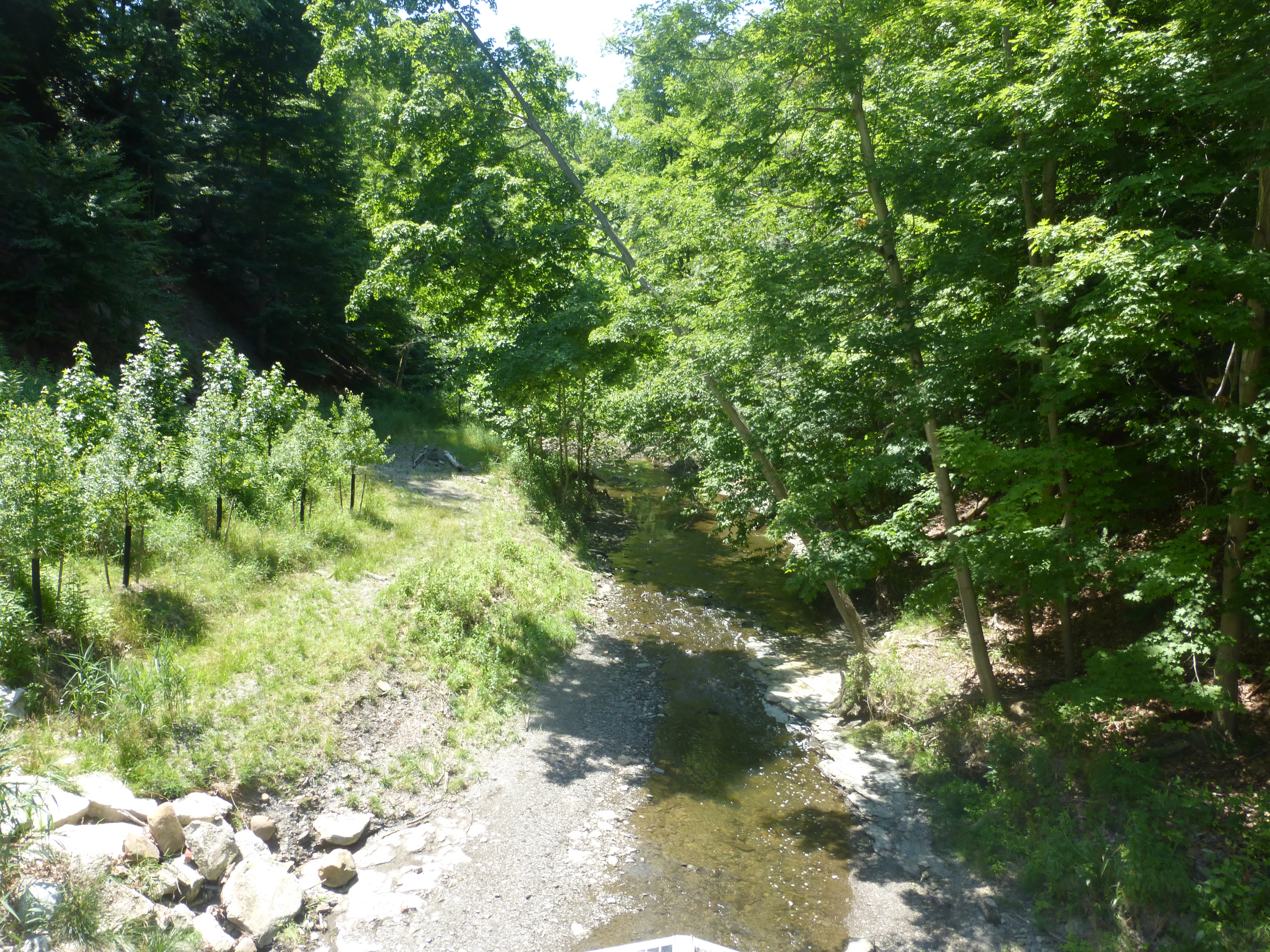
- Abram Creek on the property of the NASA Glenn Research Center in Brook Park, Ohio. Photo taken from the West Area Road overpass, looking upstream. This location is less than one half mile upstream of the mouth of the creek, where it joins the Rocky River.

- Mouth

Location
- Country: United States of America
- Cities: Berea, Brook Park, Cleveland, Middleburg Heights, Parma Heights

Physical characteristics
- Mouth
  - location: Rocky River in Brook Park, near NASA Glenn Research Center
  - coordinates: 41°25′04″N 81°51′59″W
- Length: 7.4 mi (11.9 km)
- Basin size: 10.6 mi^{2} (27 km^{2})

Abram Creek, in Cuyahoga County, Ohio, is a tributary of the Rocky River, draining 10.6 square miles in parts of Berea (6.6% of the basin area), Brook Park (31.3%), Cleveland (13.1%), Middleburg Heights (48.8%), and a very small portion of Parma Heights(0.2%).

The watershed comprises residential, commercial, light industrial, and natural areas, including significant portions of Cleveland Hopkins International Airport and the NASA Glenn Research Center. A section of the upper creek, including Lake Isaac, Lake Abram, and the Lake-to-Lake Trail are owned and managed by the Cleveland Metroparks. The creek has been transformed extensively by humans, from extensive swamp, to onion-producing cropland, to polluted creek, to its present, mixed state.

== History ==
Much of the land around Abram Creek was marshland when white settlers arrived. The swamp was known as "Podunk" and for a time was home to a gang of counterfeiters whose coins became known as "Podunk money". The creek and Lake Abram were named after Abram Hickox, the first blacksmith of Cleveland, and uncle of Jared Hickox, the first white settler of Middleburg Township. The land, though mucky, proved fertile, and much of it was drained for farmland. Starting in 1843, onions became the primary crop of the area, so much so that Berea became known as the "Onion Capital of the Nation"

To accommodate the lengthening of and increased separation between runways 5L/23R and 5R/23L, Cleveland Hopkins International Airport routed a section of the creek through a set of four ten-foot diameter concrete culverts. The 3,800-foot-long culverts were built spanning the entire length of the creek's path through the airport property. The contract to perform the culverting was awarded to Independence Excavating in 2001, with construction starting in January 2002 and finishing in 2004.

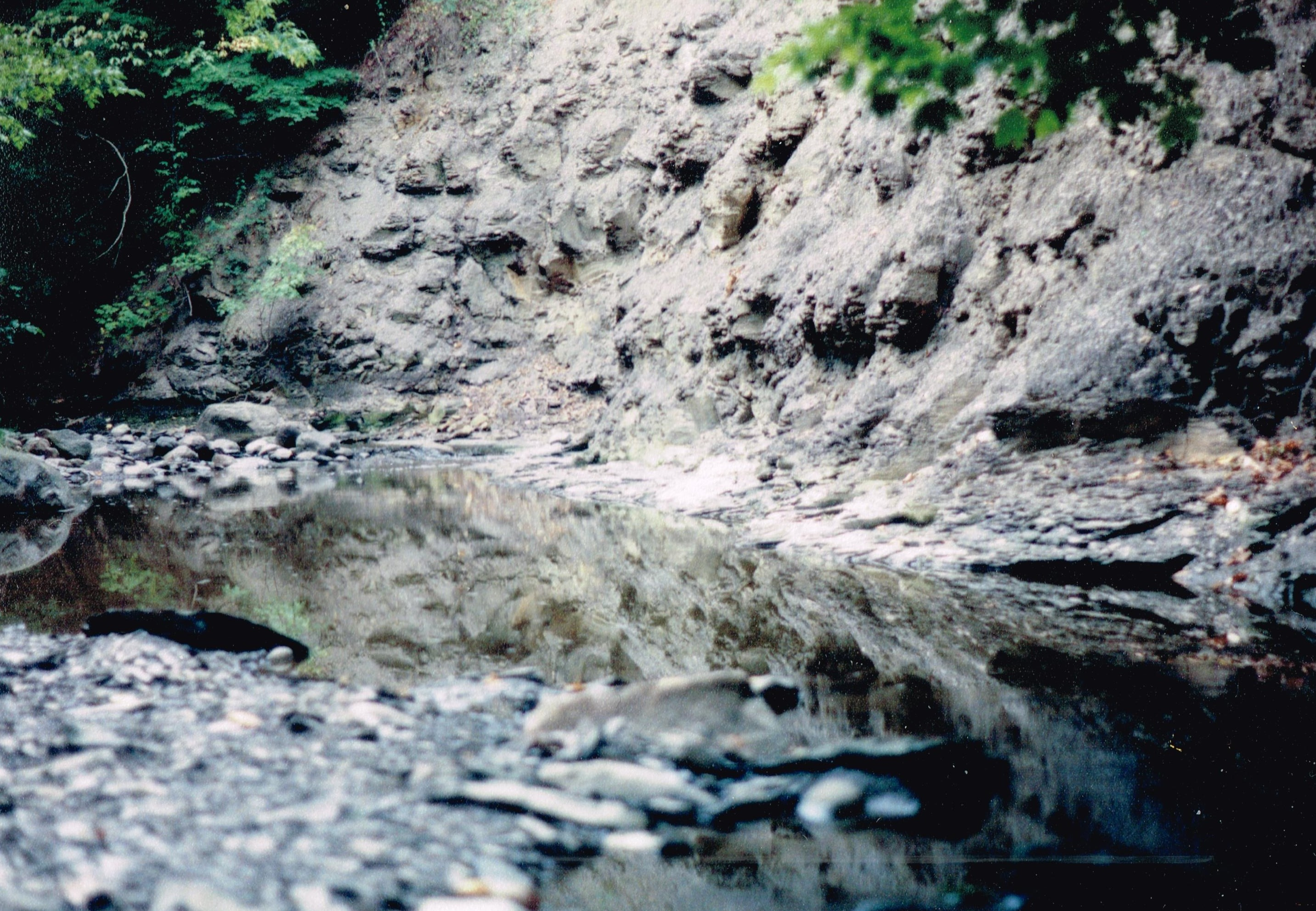
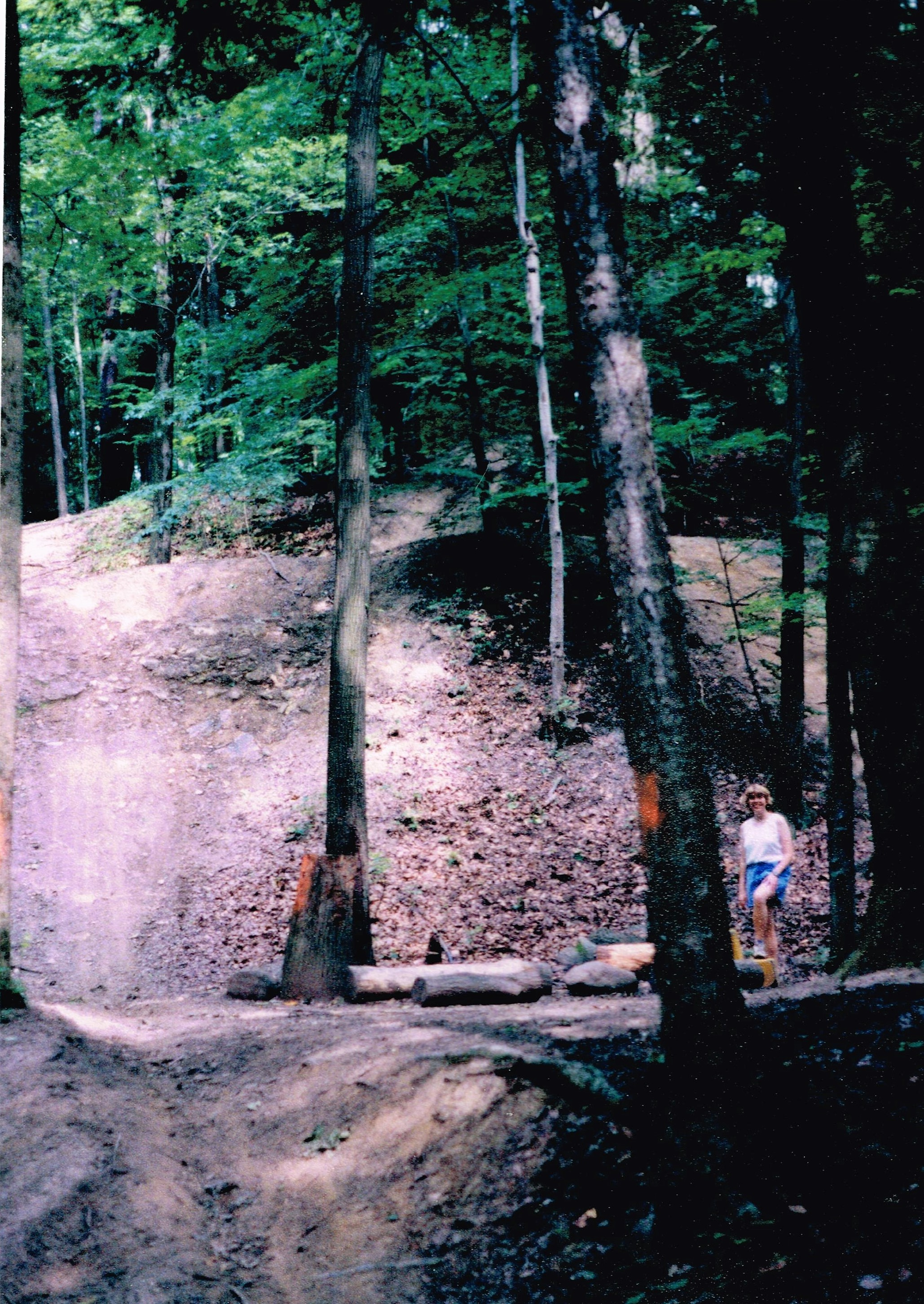

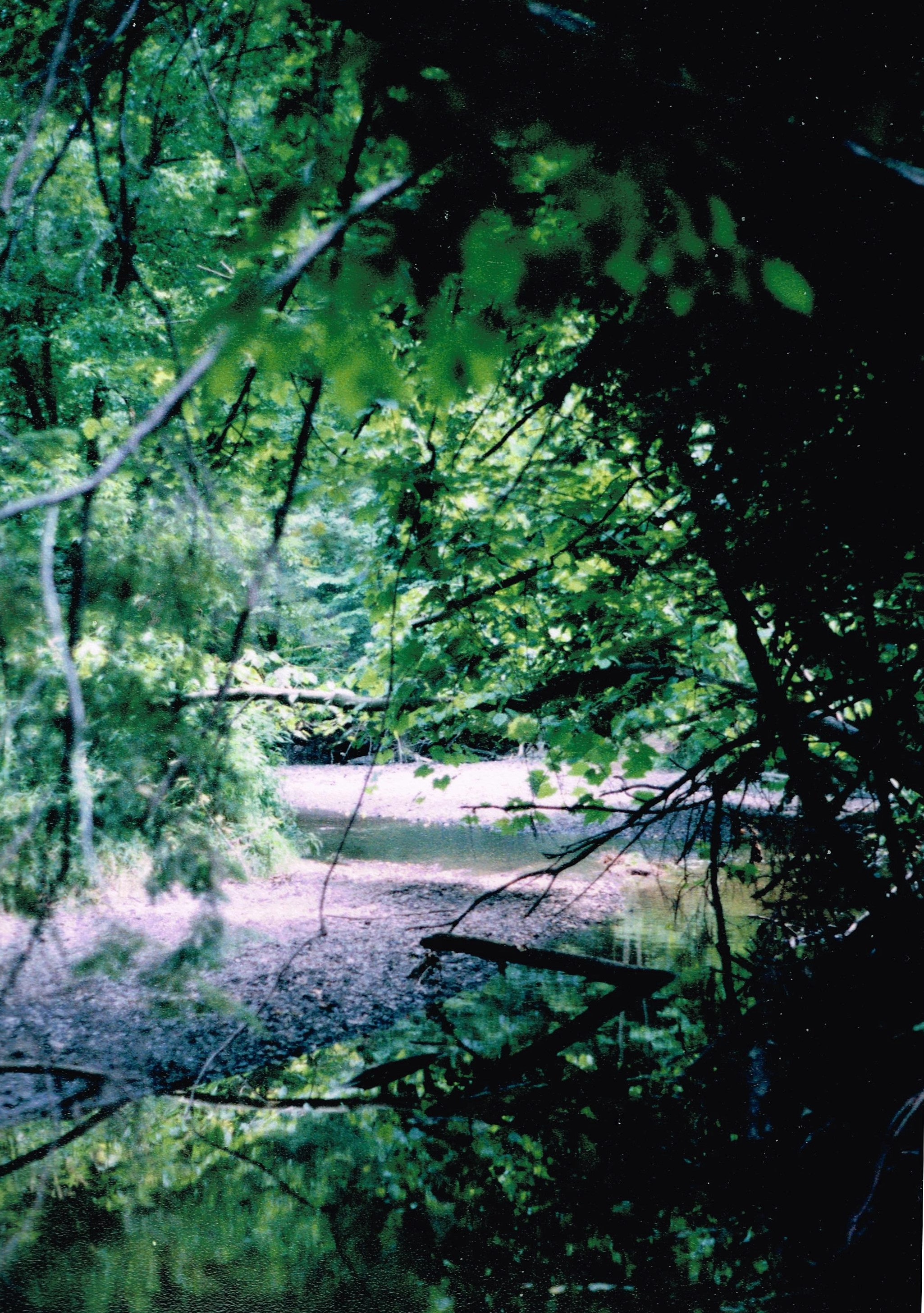
Valley floor of Abram Creek, prior to being buried in order to extend runways at Cleveland Hopkins Airport

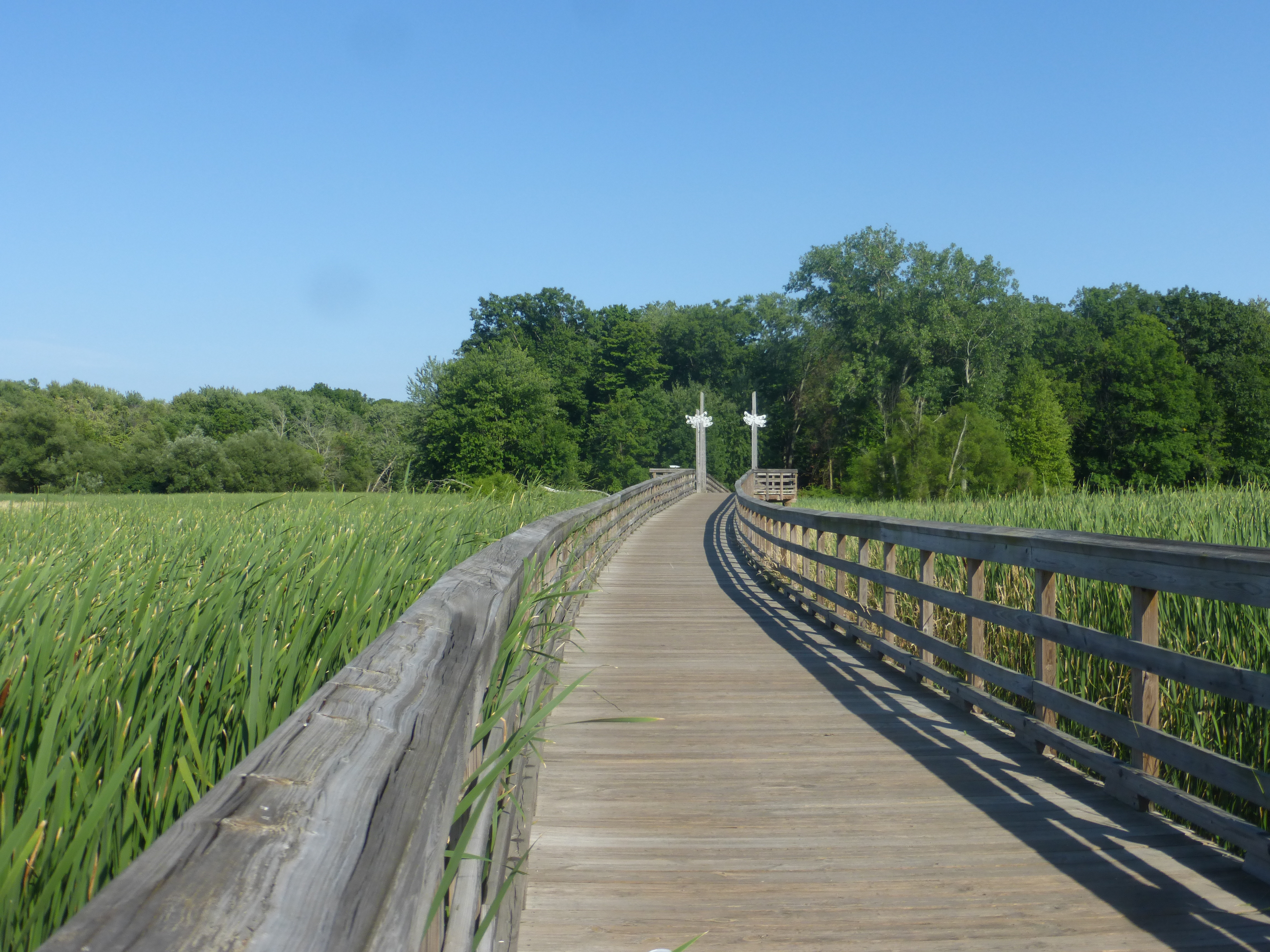
Lake Abram in Middleburg Heights, Ohio. Taken from the boardwalk along the Lake-to-Lake Trail.

From the 1990s through 2013, the Cleveland Metroparks targeted Lake Abram and the marshland between Lake Isaac and Lake Abram for acquisition, it being last glacial pothole wetland in Cuyahoga County. Through a series of acquisitions the Metroparks gained 80 acres of nearly-contiguous land, the interruption being along the Bagley Road corridor. In 2009, the Lake-to-Lake Trail, a paved/boardwalk path between the lakes, was completed, allowing visitors access to the land. An estimated 40-50 people per hour use the path.

== Basin ==
=== Geology ===
The Abram Creek channel consists of shales and sandstones deposited during the Paleozoic Era, including the Ohio Shale (usually divided into the Chagrin Shale, Huron Shale, and Cleveland Shale), the Bedford Shale, and the Berea sandstone).

Soils in the watershed are part of the Urban Land-Mahoning association. The central wetland areas consist primarily of Carlisle silty clay loam, while wetland margins and watercourses have Condit silty clay loam and Canadice silty clay loam. Upland areas are mostly Mahoning silt loam with local inclusions of Ellsworth, Fitchville, Glenford and Loudonville silt loams, and Chili and Haskins loams.

=== Water quality and wildlife habitat ===
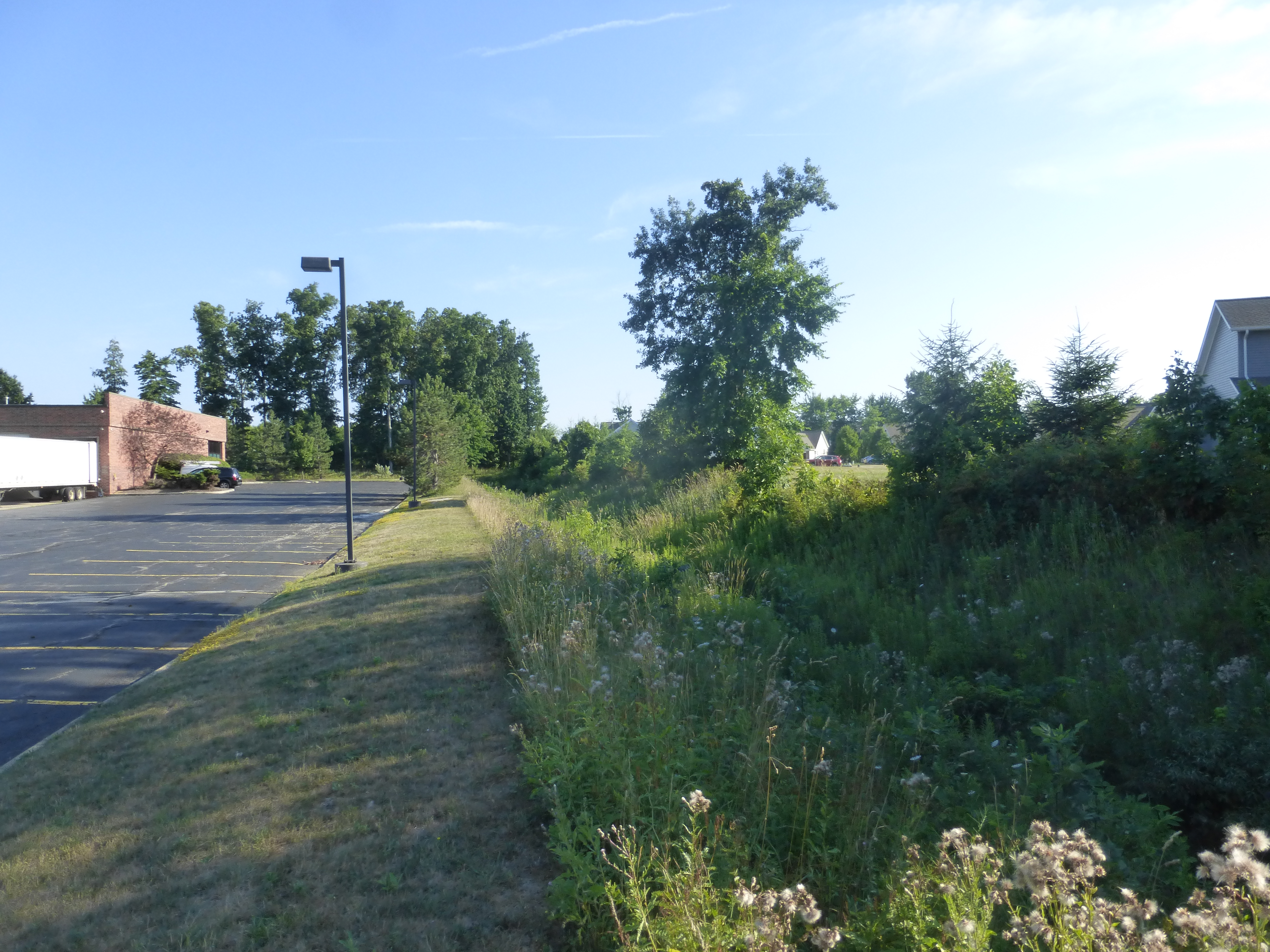
Abram Creek in Middleburg Heights, Ohio. The creek follows the property line between light industrial properties on the left and residential properties on the right.

The course, extent, and sources of Abram Creek and its lakes have been dramatically altered over the years. Lake Abram has been shrunk from 50-60 acres to its present 5 acres. Much of the creek has been channelized or culverted. Significant sources of pollution, such as the wastewater treatment plants for Brook Park and Middleburg Heights have been decommissioned. Deicing runoff from Cleveland Hopkins International Airport has been significantly contained. Still, runoff from residential and commercial properties remain as a significant pollution source.

A study performed by the Northeast Ohio Regional Sewer District (NEORSD) in 2012 examined Abram Creek by sampling at 3 locations as well as in the Rocky River just upstream and downstream of its confluence with Abram Creek. Assessments were made of water chemistry, habitat assessment, electrofishing, and benthic macroinvertebrates. The narrative noted that two wastewater treatment plants that discharged into Abram Creek were closed in the 1990s and deicing waste from the airport had been diverted to NEORSD in the early 2000s. The assessments generally indicated some improvement in most metrics from previous assessments, but still had non-attainments, particularly for upstream sample locations. The report concluded that significant improvement of the metrics in the future is unlikely due to a variety of factors.

A study was conducted on the effect of culverting at the airport. The authors concluded that the measured water quality metrics upstream and downstream of the culverts were not changed, suggesting that runoff management practices on the construction site were effective. However, the culvert does block the migration of fish between the lower and upper portions of the creek.
