= Lightburn, West Virginia =

- Unincorporated community
- Location within the state of West Virginia Lightburn (the United States)
- Coordinates: 39°7′33″N 80°27′4″W
- Country: United States
- State: West Virginia
- County: Lewis
- Elevation: 1,010 ft (310 m)
- Time zone: UTC-5 (Eastern (EST))
  - Summer (DST): UTC-4 (EDT)
- GNIS ID: 1554952

Lightburn is an unincorporated community in Lewis County, West Virginia, United States. Its post office is closed.

The community was named in honor of Union Army general Joseph Andrew Jackson Lightburn.
