= Georgetown, Marshall County, West Virginia =

Unincorporated community in West Virginia, United States

Georgetown
- Unincorporated community
- Location within the state of West Virginia Georgetown (the United States)
- Coordinates: 39°44′23″N 80°31′25″W
- Country: United States
- State: West Virginia
- County: Marshall
- Time zone: UTC-5 (Eastern (EST))
  - Summer (DST): UTC-4 (EDT)

Georgetown is an unincorporated community in Marshall County, West Virginia, United States. It is located on County Route 250/14 along the Pennsylvania Fork Fish Creek near the Pennsylvania border.
