= Georgetown (CDP), Maryland =

Georgetown, Maryland
- Census-designated place
- Location within Maryland Location within the United States
- Coordinates: 39°13′16″N 76°11′47″W
- Country: United States
- State: Maryland
- County: Kent

Area
  - Total: 1.47 sq mi (3.82 km^{2})
  - Land: 1.47 sq mi (3.81 km^{2})
  - Water: 0.0039 sq mi (0.01 km^{2})
- Elevation: 43 ft (13 m)

Population (2020)
  - Total: 117
  - Density: 79.6/sq mi (30.73/km^{2})
- Time zone: UTC-5 (Eastern (EST))
  - Summer (DST): UTC-4 (EDT)
- Area codes: 410 & 443
- FIPS code: 24-31875
- GNIS feature ID: 2583629

Georgetown is an unincorporated community and census-designated place in western Kent County, Maryland, United States. Per the 2020 census, the population was 117. It should not be confused with the community of the same name 22 miles (35 km) to the northeast on the Kent/Cecil County border.

== Geography ==
The Georgetown CDP is 7 miles (11 km) west of Chestertown, the Kent county seat. It is bordered to the east by the community of Fairlee, and Tolchester Beach on the shore of Chesapeake Bay is 2 miles (3 km) to the west.

According to the U.S. Census Bureau, the Georgetown CDP has a total area of 1.5 square miles (3.8 km^{2}), of which 0.004 square miles (0.01 km^{2}), or 0.38%, are water.

== Demographics ==
Historical population
Census	Pop.	Note	%±
2010	143		—
2020	117		−18.2%
U.S. Decennial Census; 2010 2020

=== 2020 census ===
Georgetown CDP, Maryland – Racial and ethnic composition Note: the US Census treats Hispanic/Latino as an ethnic category. This table excludes Latinos from the racial categories and assigns them to a separate category. Hispanics/Latinos may be of any race.
Race / Ethnicity (NH = Non-Hispanic)	Pop 2010	Pop 2020	% 2010	% 2020
White alone (NH)	33	51	23.08%	43.59%
Black or African American alone (NH)	96	60	67.13%	51.28%
Native American or Alaska Native alone (NH)	0	0	0.00%	0.00%
Asian alone (NH)	1	0	0.70%	0.00%
Pacific Islander alone (NH)	0	0	0.00%	0.00%
Some Other Race alone (NH)	1	0	0.70%	0.00%
Mixed Race/Multi-Racial (NH)	8	2	5.59%	1.71%
Hispanic or Latino (any race)	4	4	2.80%	3.42%
Total	143	117	100.00%	100.00%
