= Lewis County, West Virginia =

County in West Virginia, United States

- County
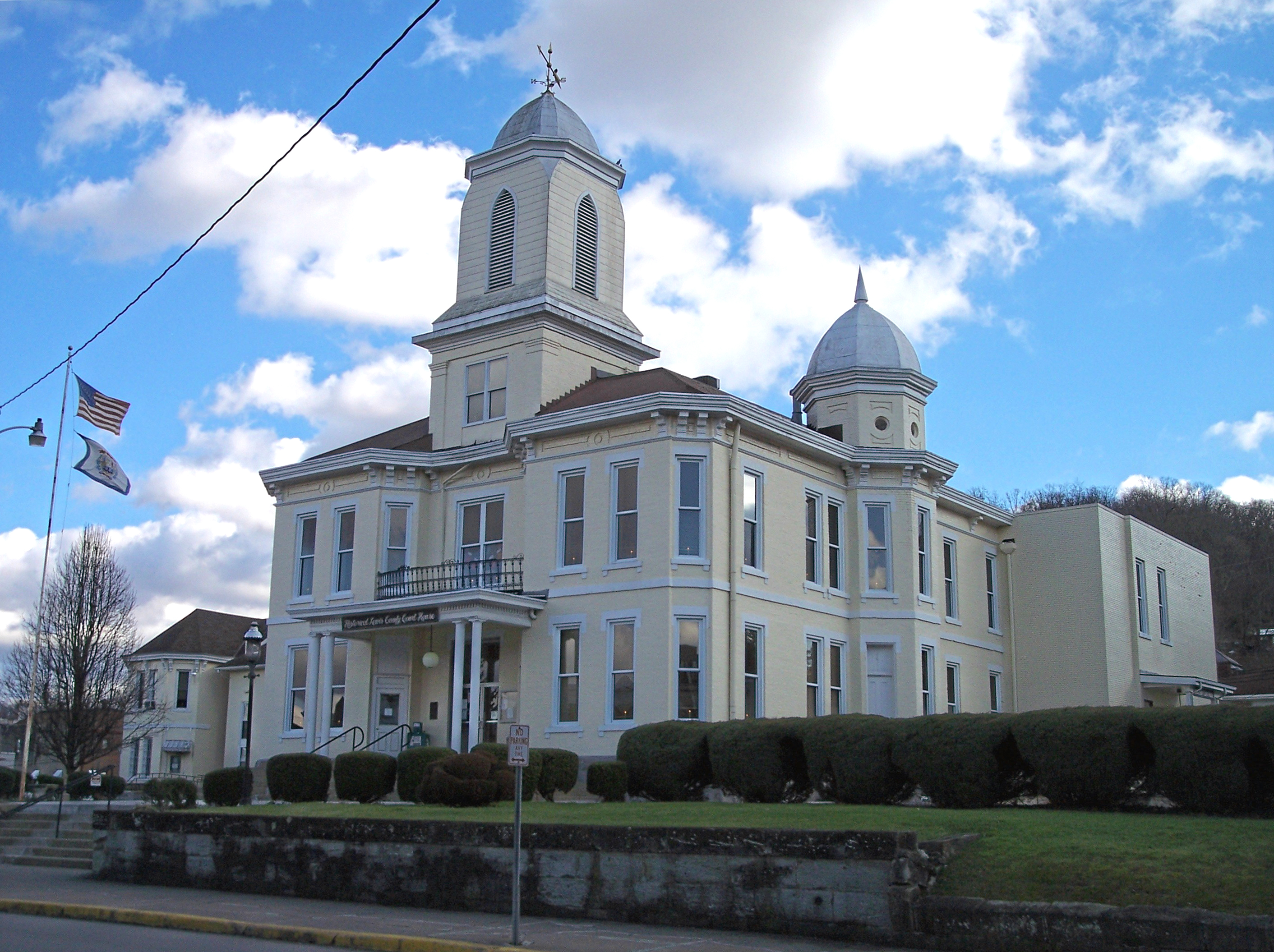
- Lewis County Courthouse

- Seal

- Location within the U.S. state of West Virginia
- Coordinates: 39°00′N 80°31′W
- Country: United States
- State: West Virginia
- Founded: December 18, 1816
- Seat: Weston
- Largest city: Weston

Area
  - Total: 390 sq mi (1,000 km^{2})
  - Land: 385 sq mi (1,000 km^{2})
  - Water: 4.8 sq mi (12 km^{2}) 1.2%

Population (2020)
  - Total: 17,033
  - Estimate (2025): 16,394 ▼
  - Density: 44.2/sq mi (17.1/km^{2})
- Time zone: UTC−5 (Eastern)
  - Summer (DST): UTC−4 (EDT)
- Congressional district: 2nd
- Website: www.lewiscountywv.org

Lewis County is a county in the U.S. state of West Virginia. As of the 2020 census, the population was 17,033. Its county seat is Weston. The county was formed in 1816 from Harrison County and named for Col. Charles Lewis (1733–1774), a Virginian killed in the Battle of Point Pleasant.

== Geography ==
According to the United States Census Bureau, the county has a total area of 390 square miles (1,000 km^{2}), of which 385 square miles (1,000 km^{2}) is land and 4.8 square miles (12 km^{2}) (1.2%) is water.

In 1863, West Virginia's counties were divided into civil townships, with the intention of encouraging local government. This proved impractical in the heavily rural state, and in 1872 the townships were converted into magisterial districts. Lewis County was initially divided into five townships: Battelle, Jane Lew, Lincoln, Sheridan, and Willey. Between 1870 and '80, these were renamed "Collins Settlement", "Court House", "Freemans Creek", (Note: Originally spelled "Freeman's Creek".) "Hackers Creek", (Note: Originally spelled "Hacker's Creek".) and "Skin Creek". In the 1990s, Collins Settlement and Court House Districts were consolidated into one district, known as "Courthouse-Collins Settlement"; Hackers Creek and Skin Creek were also consolidated, forming "Hackers Creek-Skin Creek".

=== Major highways ===
- Interstate 79
- U.S. Highway 19
- U.S. Highway 48
- U.S. Highway 33/119
- West Virginia Route 4

=== Adjacent counties ===
- Harrison County (north)
- Upshur County (east)
- Webster County (south)
- Braxton County (southwest)
- Gilmer County (west)
- Doddridge County (northwest)

== Demographics ==
Historical population
Census	Pop.	Note	%±
1820	4,247		—
1830	6,241		47.0%
1840	8,151		30.6%
1850	10,031		23.1%
1860	7,999		−20.3%
1870	10,175		27.2%
1880	13,269		30.4%
1890	15,895		19.8%
1900	16,980		6.8%
1910	18,821		10.8%
1920	20,455		8.7%
1930	21,794		6.5%
1940	22,271		2.2%
1950	21,074		−5.4%
1960	19,711		−6.5%
1970	17,847		−9.5%
1980	18,813		5.4%
1990	17,223		−8.5%
2000	16,919		−1.8%
2010	16,372		−3.2%
2020	17,033		4.0%
2025 (est.)	16,394	▼	−3.8%
U.S. Decennial Census; 1790–1960 1900–1990; 1990–2000 2010–2020

=== 2020 census ===
As of the 2020 census, the county had a population of 17,033. Of the residents, 20.7% were under the age of 18 and 20.8% were 65 years of age or older; the median age was 44.4 years. For every 100 females there were 100.2 males, and for every 100 females age 18 and over there were 98.0 males.

The racial makeup of the county was 94.9% White, 0.4% Black or African American, 0.1% American Indian and Alaska Native, 0.3% Asian, 0.3% from some other race, and 3.9% from two or more races. Hispanic or Latino residents of any race comprised 1.1% of the population.

There were 7,112 households in the county, of which 26.8% had children under the age of 18 living with them and 24.8% had a female householder with no spouse or partner present. About 29.8% of all households were made up of individuals and 13.8% had someone living alone who was 65 years of age or older.

There were 8,204 housing units, of which 13.3% were vacant. Among occupied housing units, 74.0% were owner-occupied and 26.0% were renter-occupied. The homeowner vacancy rate was 1.8% and the rental vacancy rate was 12.0%.

The median income for a household in the county was $45,345 and the poverty rate was 17.2%.

Lewis County, West Virginia – Racial and ethnic composition Note: the US Census treats Hispanic/Latino as an ethnic category. This table excludes Latinos from the racial categories and assigns them to a separate category. Hispanics/Latinos may be of any race.
Race / Ethnicity (NH = Non-Hispanic)	Pop 2000	Pop 2010	Pop 2020	% 2000	% 2010	% 2020
White alone (NH)	16,604	15,964	16,088	98.13%	97.50%	94.45%
Black or African American alone (NH)	22	65	66	0.13%	0.39%	0.38%
Native American or Alaska Native alone (NH)	34	32	19	0.20%	0.19%	0.11%
Asian alone (NH)	48	51	58	0.28%	0.31%	0.34%
Pacific Islander alone (NH)	0	1	7	0.00%	0.00%	0.04%
Other race alone (NH)	8	7	23	0.04%	0.04%	0.13%
Mixed race or Multiracial (NH)	118	148	581	0.69%	0.90%	3.41%
Hispanic or Latino (any race)	85	104	191	0.50%	0.63%	1.12%
Total	16,919	16,372	17,033	100.00%	100.00%	100.00%

=== 2010 census ===
As of the 2010 United States census, there were 16,372 people, 6,863 households, and 4,570 families living in the county. The population density was 42.5 inhabitants per square mile (16.4/km^{2}). There were 7,958 housing units at an average density of 20.7 units per square mile (8.0 units/km^{2}). The racial makeup of the county was 97.9% white, 0.5% black or African American, 0.3% Asian, 0.2% American Indian, 0.1% from other races, and 1.0% from two or more races. Those of Hispanic or Latino origin made up 0.6% of the population. In terms of ancestry, 17.5% were American, 15.0% were German, 9.9% were Irish, and 7.2% were English.

Of the 6,863 households, 28.1% had children under the age of 18 living with them, 50.9% were married couples living together, 10.9% had a female householder with no husband present, 33.4% were non-families, and 28.5% of all households were made up of individuals. The average household size was 2.35 and the average family size was 2.84. The median age was 43.4 years.

The median income for a household in the county was $33,293 and the median income for a family was $42,281. Males had a median income of $31,950 versus $25,945 for females. The per capita income for the county was $18,240. About 13.6% of families and 19.6% of the population were below the poverty line, including 25.3% of those under age 18 and 12.9% of those age 65 or over.

=== 2000 census ===
As of the census of 2000, there were 16,919 people, 6,946 households, and 4,806 families living in the county. The population density was 44 people per square mile (17 people/km^{2}). There were 7,944 housing units at an average density of 21 units per square mile (8.1 units/km^{2}). The racial makeup of the county was 98.59% White, 0.13% Black or African American, 0.20% Native American, 0.29% Asian, 0.08% from other races, and 0.70% from two or more races. 0.50% of the population were Hispanic or Latino of any race.

There were 6,946 households, out of which 28.60% had children under the age of 18 living with them, 54.60% were married couples living together, 10.50% had a female householder with no husband present, and 30.80% were non-families. 26.90% of all households were made up of individuals, and 13.00% had someone living alone who was 65 years of age or older. The average household size was 2.40 and the average family size was 2.88.

In the county, the population was spread out, with 22.10% under the age of 18, 7.70% from 18 to 24, 28.00% from 25 to 44, 25.90% from 45 to 64, and 16.40% who were 65 years of age or older. The median age was 40 years. For every 100 females there were 94.20 males. For every 100 females age 18 and over, there were 91.40 males.

The median income for a household in the county was $27,066, and the median income for a family was $32,431. Males had a median income of $27,906 versus $18,733 for females. The per capita income for the county was $13,933. 19.90% of the population and 16.30% of families were below the poverty line. 27.00% of those under the age of 18 and 11.20% of those 65 and older were living below the poverty line.

== Politics ==
United States presidential election results for Lewis County, West Virginia
Year	Republican		Democratic		Third party(ies)	
Year	No.	%	No.	%	No.	%
1912	1,029	24.21%	1,929	45.39%	1,292	30.40%
1916	2,263	49.06%	2,248	48.73%	102	2.21%
1920	4,618	57.14%	3,310	40.96%	154	1.91%
1924	4,839	51.10%	4,410	46.57%	221	2.33%
1928	5,290	57.37%	3,825	41.48%	106	1.15%
1932	4,704	45.31%	5,546	53.42%	131	1.26%
1936	5,499	49.61%	5,531	49.90%	54	0.49%
1940	5,935	56.52%	4,566	43.48%	0	0.00%
1944	4,984	59.80%	3,350	40.20%	0	0.00%
1948	4,829	57.89%	3,477	41.69%	35	0.42%
1952	6,254	65.60%	3,280	34.40%	0	0.00%
1956	6,203	66.01%	3,194	33.99%	0	0.00%
1960	5,157	58.56%	3,649	41.44%	0	0.00%
1964	2,979	36.21%	5,248	63.79%	0	0.00%
1968	4,027	51.40%	3,168	40.43%	640	8.17%
1972	5,778	73.70%	2,062	26.30%	0	0.00%
1976	3,736	48.54%	3,960	51.46%	0	0.00%
1980	3,747	49.23%	3,455	45.39%	409	5.37%
1984	5,297	65.96%	2,693	33.53%	41	0.51%
1988	3,602	52.14%	3,272	47.37%	34	0.49%
1992	2,413	36.77%	2,931	44.66%	1,219	18.57%
1996	2,285	37.02%	2,868	46.46%	1,020	16.52%
2000	3,606	58.79%	2,355	38.39%	173	2.82%
2004	4,445	63.51%	2,475	35.36%	79	1.13%
2008	4,335	65.60%	2,109	31.92%	164	2.48%
2012	4,375	69.51%	1,736	27.58%	183	2.91%
2016	5,274	76.04%	1,347	19.42%	315	4.54%
2020	5,782	77.52%	1,538	20.62%	139	1.86%
2024	5,550	78.75%	1,372	19.47%	126	1.79%

== Communities ==
=== City ===
- Weston (county seat)

=== Town ===
- Jane Lew

=== Magisterial districts ===
- Courthouse-Collins Settlement
- Freemans Creek
- Hackers Creek-Skin Creek

=== Unincorporated communities ===
- Aberdeen
- Alkires Mills
- Alum Bridge
- Aspinall
- Bablin
- Bealls Mills
- Ben Dale
- Bennett
- Berlin
- Brownsville
- Butchersville
- Camden
- Churchville
- Copley
- Cox Town
- Crawford
- Emmart
- Freemansburg
- Gaston
- Georgetown
- Homewood
- Horner
- Ingo
- Ireland
- Jackson Mill
- Jacksonville
- Kitsonville
- Lightburn
- McGuire Park
- Orlando
- Pickle Street
- Roanoke
- Turnertown
- Walkersville
- Valley Chapel
- Vadis

== See also ==
- National Register of Historic Places listings in Lewis County, West Virginia
- Stonewall Jackson Lake
- Stonewall Resort State Park
- Lewis County Schools
