= National Register of Historic Places listings in Lewis County, West Virginia =

Location of Lewis County in West Virginia

This is a list of the National Register of Historic Places listings in Lewis County, West Virginia.

This is intended to be a complete list of the properties and districts on the National Register of Historic Places in Lewis County, West Virginia, United States. The locations of National Register properties and districts for which the latitude and longitude coordinates are included below, may be seen in an online map.

There are 14 properties and districts listed on the National Register in the county, 1 of which is a National Historic Landmark.

This National Park Service list is complete through NPS recent listings posted January 2, 2026.

Contents: Counties in West Virginia

Barbour - Berkeley - Boone - Braxton - Brooke - Cabell - Calhoun - Clay - Doddridge - Fayette - Gilmer - Grant - Greenbrier - Hampshire - Hancock - Hardy - Harrison - Jackson - Jefferson - Kanawha - Lewis - Lincoln - Logan - Marion - Marshall - Mason - McDowell - Mercer - Mineral - Mingo - Monongalia - Monroe - Morgan - Nicholas - Ohio - Pendleton - Pleasants - Pocahontas - Preston - Putnam - Raleigh - Randolph - Ritchie - Roane - Summers - Taylor - Tucker - Tyler - Upshur - Wayne - Webster - Wetzel - Wirt - Wood - Wyoming

== Current listings ==
	Name on the Register	Image	Date listed	Location	City or town	Description
1	Annamede		March 11, 1987 (#87000218)	RD 1, Box 126, U.S. Route 19; 38°52′35″N 80°26′35″W	Walkersville	
2	Arnold – Old Hill Cemetery		January 9, 2026 (#100012526)	Reservoir and Arnold Streets; 39°02′07″N 80°28′08″W	Weston	
3	Jonathan M. Bennett House	Jonathan M. Bennett House	June 9, 1978 (#78002804)	Court Ave. 39°02′11″N 80°27′55″W	Weston	
4	Gum Farmstead Historic District		November 30, 2020 (#100005827)	3414 Freeman's Creek Rd. 39°05′46″N 80°34′58″W	Camden vicinity	
5	Jackson's Mill	Jackson's Mill	February 23, 1972 (#72001289)	East of Jackson Mill on Route 1; 39°05′46″N 80°27′59″W	Weston vicinity	
6	Jackson's Mill State 4-H Camp Historic District	Jackson's Mill State 4-H Camp Historic District	February 4, 2005 (#04001598)	160 Jackson Mill Rd. 39°05′55″N 80°28′12″W	Weston vicinity	
7	May-Kraus Farm		March 22, 2006 (#06000175)	3052 Crooked Run Rd. 39°01′22″N 80°37′46″W	Alum Bridge	
8	St. Bernard Church and Cemetery	St. Bernard Church and Cemetery	July 12, 1985 (#85001583)	County Routes 20/6 and 17/2; 38°59′35″N 80°35′34″W	Camden	
9	Upper Glady School	Upper Glady School	March 20, 2002 (#02000252)	County Route 52, 1.9 miles north of McCord Run Rd. 38°48′59″N 80°24′26″W	Crawford	
10	Walkersville Covered Bridge	Walkersville Covered Bridge	June 4, 1981 (#81000603)	On County Route 19/17 near U.S. Route 19; 38°51′30″N 80°27′39″W	Walkersville	
11	Weston Colored School	Weston Colored School	April 9, 1993 (#93000224)	345 Center St. 39°02′23″N 80°27′53″W	Weston	
12	Weston Downtown Historic District	Weston Downtown Historic District	September 28, 1985 (#85002468)	Parts of Main, Center, and Court Aves., plus 2nd and 3rd Sts. 39°02′13″N 80°28′05″W	Weston	
13	Weston Downtown Residential Historic District	Weston Downtown Residential Historic District	February 2, 2005 (#04001596)	Portions of Main, Center, and Court Aves, plus E. 1st, E. 3rd, E. 4th, E. 5th, and E. 6th Sts. 39°02′32″N 80°27′47″W	Weston	
14	Weston State Hospital	Weston State Hospital	April 19, 1978 (#78002805)	River St. 39°02′18″N 80°28′16″W	Weston	

== See also ==
- List of National Historic Landmarks in West Virginia
- National Register of Historic Places listings in West Virginia
