= Jackson's Mill (disambiguation) =

Jackson's Mill or Jackson Mill may refer to:

- Jackson's Mill, a grist mill in West Virginia
- Jackson Mills, New Jersey, an unincorporated community in Ocean County
- Jackson Mill, West Virginia, an unincorporated community in Lewis County
- Jackson's Mill Covered Bridge (disambiguation)
- Jackson's Mill State 4-H Camp Historic District, in Lewis County, West Virginia
