= Mountaineer Boys State =

West Virginia's Boys State Program

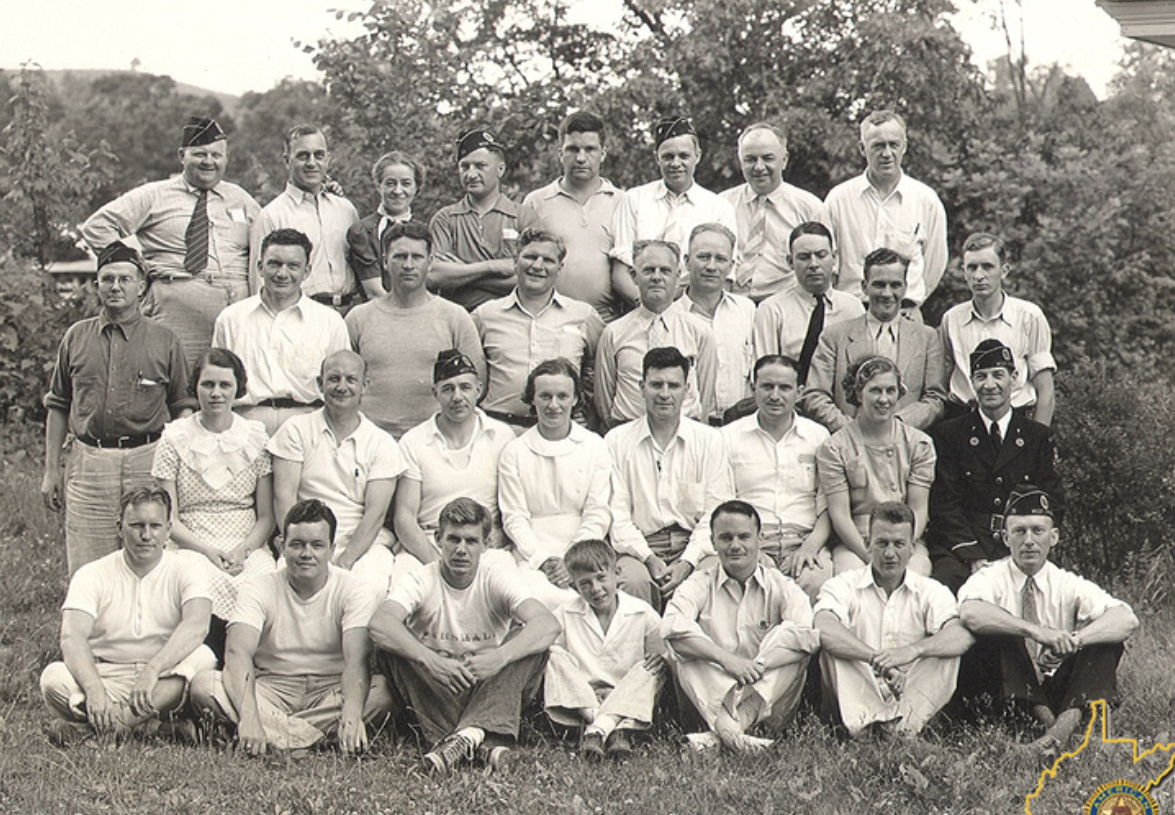
- American Legion Mountaineer Boys State Photo from first year of the program, 1936
- Abbreviation: MBS, ALMBS
- Formation: 1936
- Founded at: Jackson's Mill, WV, USA
- Purpose: To teach good government through participation
- Region served: West Virginia
- Official Song: "Men of Tomorrow" (MBS Original, 1938)
- Number of Graduates: 31,649
- Director: Robbie Robinson
- Administrator: Randall Kocsis
- Parent organization: The American Legion
- Affiliations: Boys Nation
- Volunteers: 100+
- Website: mountaineerboysstate.org

The American Legion Mountaineer Boys State (ALMBS), also known as Mountaineer Boys State (MBS), is a West Virginia chapter of The American Legion's Boys State program, which was founded in 1936. ALMBS is based in Jackson's Mill. The program has paused operations four times since its founding, taking a hiatus in 1943 and 1945 due to World War II rationing and from 2020 to 2021 due to the COVID-19 pandemic.

Notable alumni of the program include Jerry West and Bob Wise.

Since 1936, the program has been held at Jackson’s Mill, the historic West Virginia University 4-H campus located on the boyhood home of Confederate General Thomas “Stonewall” Jackson.

The program has produced more than 31,000 alumni over its history and is among the longest-running Boys State programs in the nation.
