= Hanover Township, Washington County, Pennsylvania =

Township in Pennsylvania, US

Hanover Township
- Township
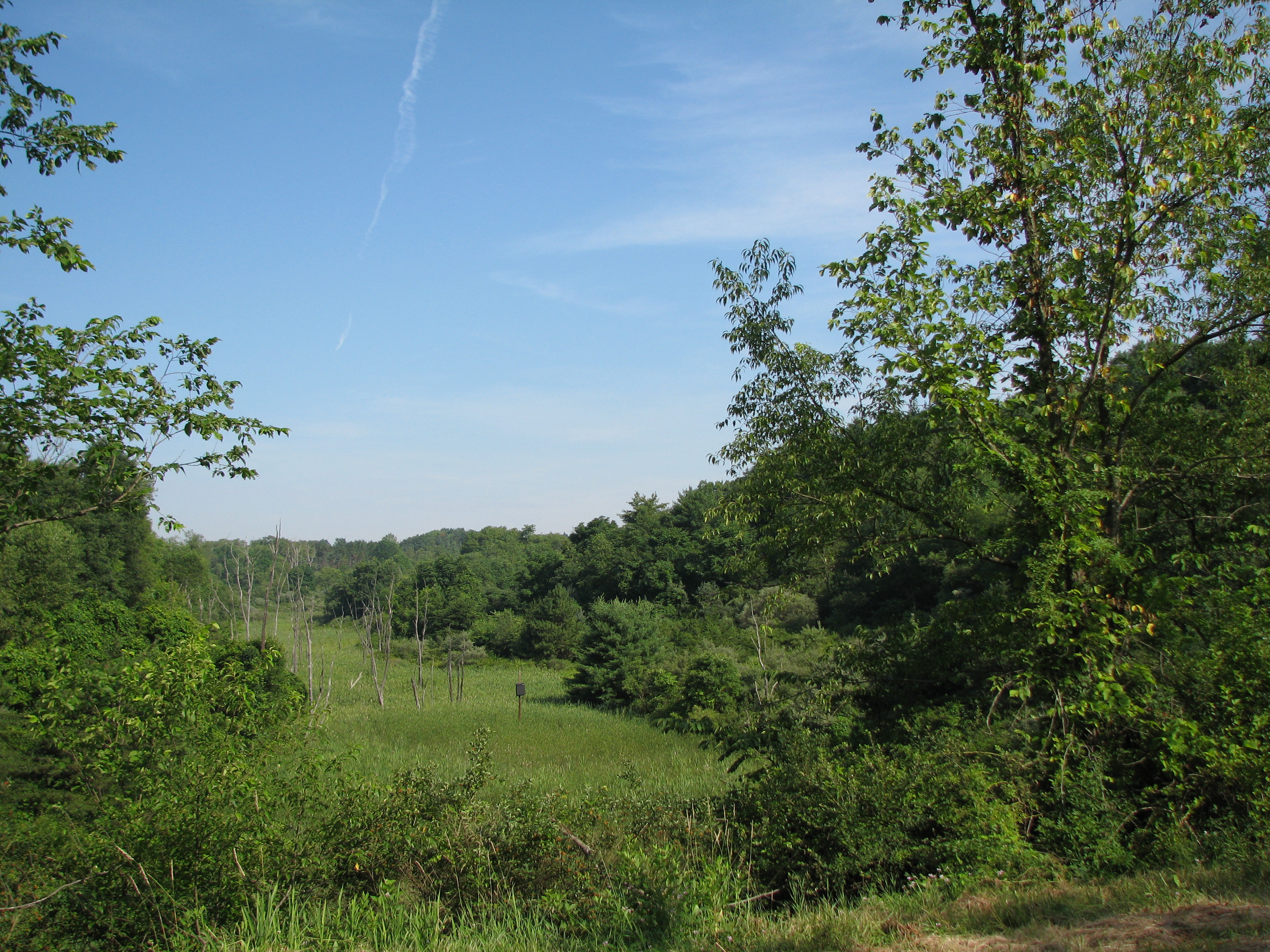
- Hillman State Park also known at Bavington Game Lands

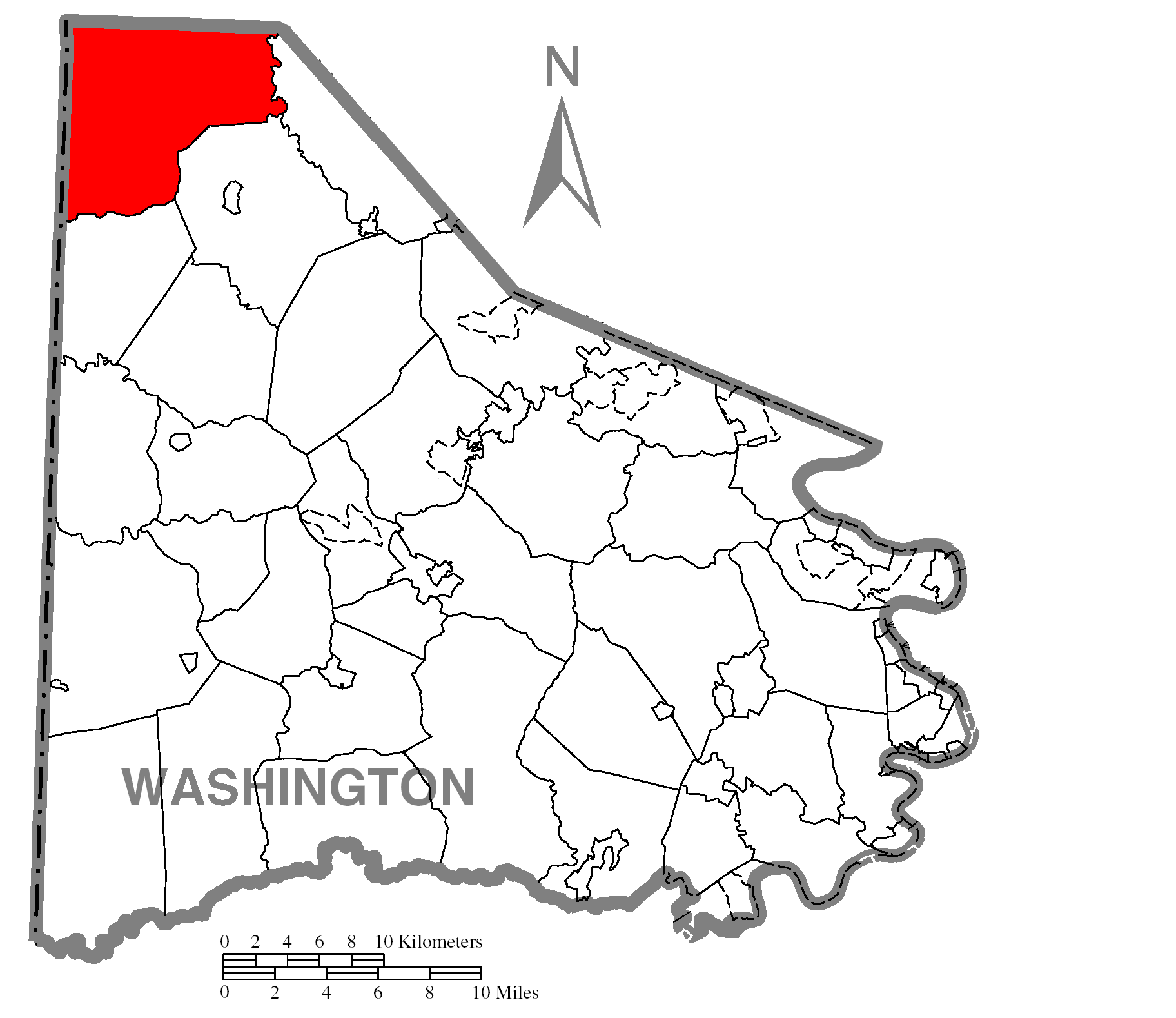
- Location of Hanover Township in Washington County

- Location of Washington County in Pennsylvania
- Country: United States
- State: Pennsylvania
- County: Washington County

Area
  - Total: 47.62 sq mi (123.34 km^{2})
  - Land: 47.59 sq mi (123.27 km^{2})
  - Water: 0.027 sq mi (0.07 km^{2})

Population (2020)
  - Total: 2,421 ▼
  - Estimate (2023): 2,399
  - Density: 55.0/sq mi (21.23/km^{2})
- Time zone: UTC-4 (EST)
  - Summer (DST): UTC-5 (EDT)
- Area code: 724
- FIPS code: 42-125-32440
- Website: https://www.hanovertwp.org/

Historical population
Census	Pop.	Note	%±
2000	2,795		—
2010	2,673		−4.4%
2020	2,421		−9.4%
2025 (est.)	2,382		−1.6%
U.S. Decennial Census

Hanover Township is a township in Washington County, Pennsylvania, United States. The population was 2,421 at the 2020 census. Hillman State Park, a Pennsylvania state park, and The Pavilion at Star Lake concert venue are located in Hanover Township.

== History ==
The Devil's Den, McClurg Covered Bridge, Jackson's Mill Covered Bridge, Lyle Covered Bridge and Ralston Freeman Covered Bridge are listed on the National Register of Historic Places.

== Villages of Hanover Township ==
Bavington (also in Smith Township), Florence, Murdocksville, Paris

== Surrounding communities ==
Hanover Township has five borders, including the city of Weirton, West Virginia to the west and the townships of Jefferson to the south, Smith to the southeast, Robinson to the east, and Beaver County's Hanover Township to the north.

== Geography ==
According to the United States Census Bureau, the township has a total area of 47.6 square miles (123 km^{2}), of which, 47.6 square miles (123 km^{2}) of it is land and 0.04 square miles (0.10 km^{2}) of it (0.08%) is water.

== Demographics ==
As of the census of 2000, there were 2,795 people, 1,080 households, and 815 families living in the township. The population density was 58.8 inhabitants per square mile (22.7/km^{2}). There were 1,124 housing units at an average density of 23.6/sq mi (9.1/km^{2}). The racial makeup of the township was 98.53% White, 0.61% African American, 0.14% Native American, 0.21% Asian, 0.04% Pacific Islander, 0.21% from other races, and 0.25% from two or more races. Hispanic or Latino of any race were 0.39% of the population.

There were 1,080 households, out of which 29.9% had children under the age of 18 living with them, 64.3% were married couples living together, 7.9% had a female householder with no husband present, and 24.5% were non-families. 22.0% of all households were made up of individuals, and 9.5% had someone living alone who was 65 years of age or older. The average household size was 2.50 and the average family size was 2.92.

In the township the population was spread out, with 21.6% under the age of 18, 5.5% from 18 to 24, 29.1% from 25 to 44, 27.0% from 45 to 64, and 16.7% who were 65 years of age or older. The median age was 42 years. For every 100 females, there were 105.1 males. For every 100 females age 18 and over, there were 103.8 males.

The median income for a household in the township was $42,563, and the median income for a family was $51,014. Males had a median income of $40,993 versus $25,625 for females. The per capita income for the township was $19,722. About 6.8% of families and 9.3% of the population were below the poverty line, including 14.3% of those under age 18 and 2.8% of those age 65 or over.
