= Buddy Hayes (disambiguation) =

Bud or Buddy Hayes may refer to:

- Buddy Hayes (baseball) (1894–after 1923), American Negro leagues catcher
- Buddy Hayes (musician) (1916–1997), American big band bass and tuba player
- Buddy Hayes (1926–1990), American featherweight boxer
- Bud Hayes, American film editor on 1997's Asteroid
