= Hillman State Park =

State Park in Washington County, Pennsylvania

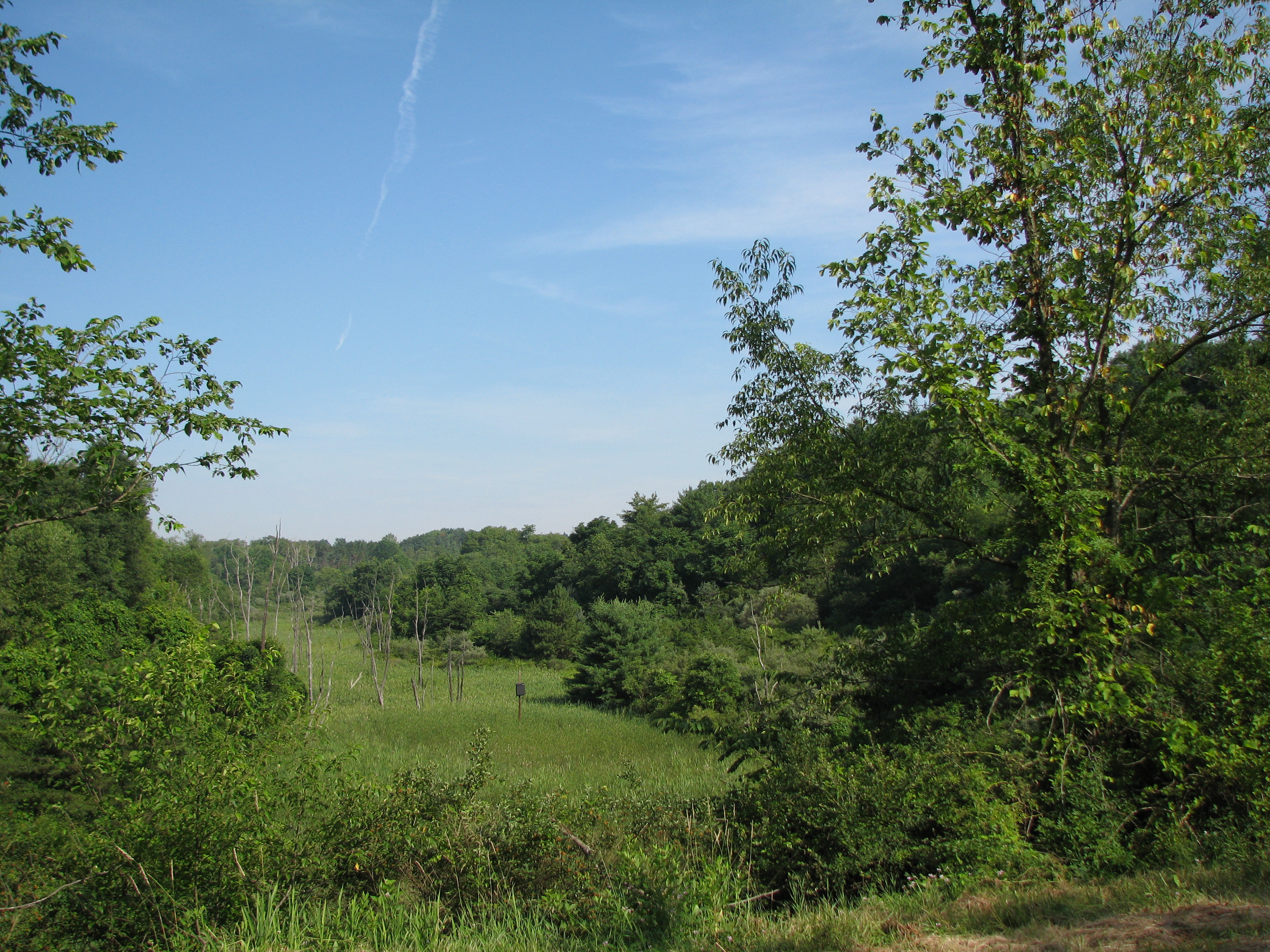
- A marsh at Hillman State Park

- Location within Pennsylvania Location within the United States
- Interactive map of Hillman State Park
- Location: Hanover Township, Washington County, Pennsylvania, United States
- Coordinates: 40°26′09″N 80°24′24″W
- Area: 3,697 acres (1,496 ha)
- Elevation: 1,063 feet (324 m)
- Established: 1969
- Administrator: Pennsylvania Department of Conservation and Natural Resources
- Named for: James F. Hillman
- Website: Official website
- Pennsylvania State Parks

Hillman State Park is a 3,697-acre (1,496 ha) Pennsylvania state park in Hanover Township, Washington County in the United States. It is about 25 miles (40 km) west of Pittsburgh. The park opened in the late 1960s and has been managed for hunting by the Pennsylvania Game Commission since the early 1980s. The park also has hiking, cross-country skiing, horseback riding, a radio-controlled aircraft field, and mountain bike trails that are open to the public. The largely undeveloped park is north of U.S. Route 22 and east of Pennsylvania Route 18 in northern Washington County near the village of Bavington and the borough of Burgettstown. Part of the park has been designated as Pennsylvania State Game Lands 117.

Hillman State Park lies within the Appalachian mixed mesophytic forests ecoregion. The park is a wild area that connects the Kings Creek and Raccoon Creek watersheds within the greater Raccoon Creek Valley Natural Area.

== History ==
In 1885, the discovery of oil led to the establishment of Five Points, an oil boomtown. Over 170 wells have been drilled in the park, though most are now abandoned.

Coal mining began in the park in 1914, and starting in 1932, the Harmon Creek Coal Corporation purchased the land that is now the park. It would become the largest bituminous coal strip mine in Pennsylvania, closed in 1968. In 1969, James F. Hillman, president of the HCCC, donated the land to the state of Pennsylvania.

The Lyle Covered Bridge, a historic bridge listed on the National Register of Historic Places, is located on the eastern side of the park.
