= St. Bernard Church and Cemetery =

Historic church in West Virginia, United States

- U.S. National Register of Historic Places
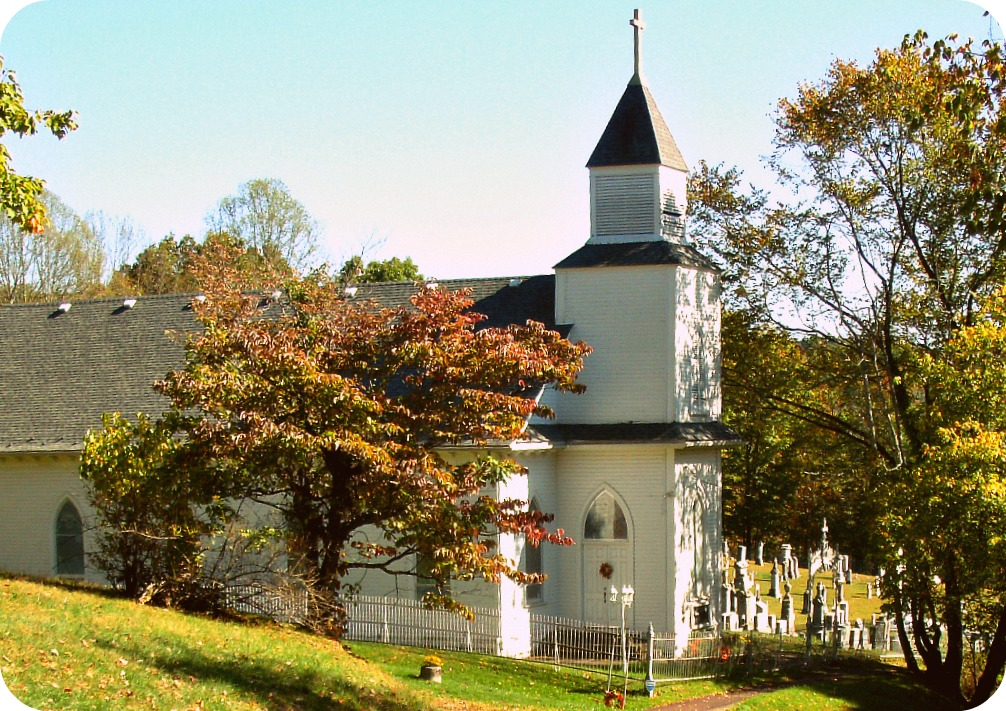

- Location within West Virginia Location within the United States
- Location: County Routes 20/6 and 17/2, near Camden, West Virginia
- Coordinates: 38°59′35″N 80°35′34″W
- Area: 2.5 acres (1.0 ha)
- Built: 1909
- Architect: Arnold, Al; Puffenberger, Mr.
- Architectural style: Gothic
- NRHP reference No.: 85001583
- Added to NRHP: July 12, 1985

St. Bernard Church and Cemetery is a historic Roman Catholic church and cemetery near Camden, Lewis County, West Virginia. It was built in 1909, and is a rectangular gable-roofed, one-story frame structure in the Gothic Revival style. It features a two-story entrance bell tower. The property includes the church cemetery; it includes the grave of Father Thomas Aquinas Quirk (1845–1937). Most of the settlers in the region, including the congregants of the church, were of Irish descent.

It was listed on the National Register of Historic Places in 1985.
