= Upper Glady School =

- U.S. National Register of Historic Places
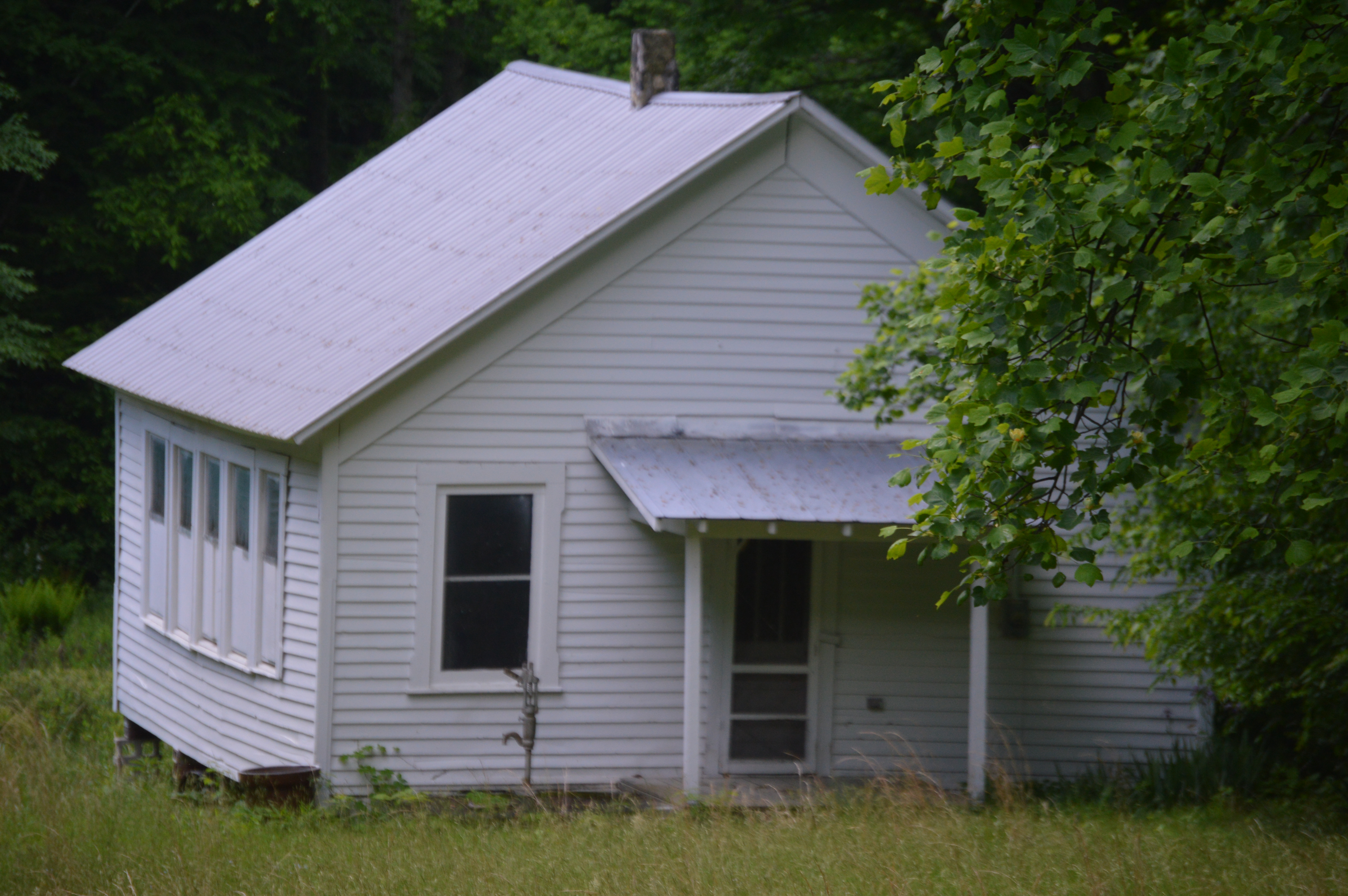
- View from the road

- Location within West Virginia Location within the United States
- Location: County Route 52, 1.9 miles north of McCord Run Rd., near Crawford, West Virginia
- Coordinates: 38°48′59″N 80°24′26″W
- Area: less than one acre
- Built: c. 1900
- Architectural style: One room school
- NRHP reference No.: 02000252
- Added to NRHP: March 20, 2002

Upper Glady School is a historic one-room school building located near Crawford, Lewis County, West Virginia. It was built about 1900, and is a frame building measuring 28 feet by 24 feet and painted white. Also on the property is a coal house used to store coal for fuel. The school operated until 1965.

It was listed on the National Register of Historic Places in 2002.
