= May–Kraus Farm =

Historic house in West Virginia, United States

- U.S. National Register of Historic Places
- Location within West Virginia Location within the United States
- Location: 3052 Crooked Run Rd., near Alum Bridge, West Virginia
- Coordinates: 39°1′22″N 80°37′46″W
- Area: 110 acres (45 ha)
- Built: 1850
- Built by: Lawrence May
- Architectural style: I-House
- NRHP reference No.: 06000175
- Added to NRHP: March 22, 2006

May–Kraus Farm, also known as La Paix Herb Farm, is a historic home located near Alum Bridge, Lewis County, West Virginia. The original farmhouse was built about 1850, and is a two-story log house appended as an ell to the rear of the main house. The main house is a two-story, wood-frame I house. It features a two-story porch. Also on the property is a root cellar (1880) and chicken / pig shed (1880).

It was listed on the National Register of Historic Places in 2006.
