= Alum Bridge, West Virginia =

Unincorporated community in West Virginia, United States

- Unincorporated community
- Location within West Virginia Location within the United States
- Coordinates: 39°02′21″N 80°39′18″W
- Country: United States
- State: West Virginia
- County: Lewis
- Elevation: 820 ft (250 m)
- Time zone: UTC-5 (Eastern (EST))
  - Summer (DST): UTC-4 (EDT)
- ZIP code: 26321
- Area codes: 304 & 681
- GNIS feature ID: 1553722

Alum Bridge is an unincorporated community in Lewis County, West Virginia, United States. Alum Bridge is located on U.S. routes 33 and 119 along Leading Creek, 10 miles (16 km) west of Weston. Alum Bridge has a post office with ZIP code 26321.

Alum Bridge was named for the local bridge over Alum Fork.
