= Museum of American Glass in West Virginia =

American glass museum

Coordinates: 39°02′18.6″N 80°27′59.5″W

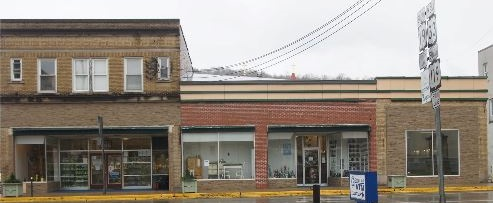

The West Virginia Museum of American Glass is located in Weston, Lewis County, West Virginia, United States. It was formed in 1993 for charitable, educational and scientific purposes to discover, procure, publish and preserve whatever may relate to the glass industry in West Virginia, the United States of America, and where ever else glass has been manufactured. Later in 2008, the name of the physical museum building was changed to The Museum of American Glass in West Virginia to better emphasize the scope of its glass collections and educational role beyond West Virginia as dictated by its state charter.

== History ==
For most of the twentieth and for a good part of the early twenty-first centuries, Lewis County in central West Virginia had been the home of some thirty glass manufacturers and at one time during the 1940s could boast that it was the largest producer of hand blown stemware in the world. In 1990, Dean Six, a West Virginia entrepreneur, well-known glass researcher and author, thought a major glass museum in the state was needed to preserve state-wide glass industry memorabilia, exhibit ware from these manufacturers and facilitate scholarly research. While advocating this idea in northern West Virginia, his initiative came to the attention of Merle Moore, the Director of the Lewis County Chamber of Commerce. She invited Dean Six to Weston where, with the help of a grant, they assembled a study group, composed of local, municipal, county, state and glass industry representatives to discuss Six's suggestion. This one-day meeting resulted in a recommendation that plans be drawn up to create a glass museum and research facility.

In May, 1992, the Weston Area Glass History and Study Group came together. It was composed of retired glassworkers, those interested in glass in general and specifically, preserving the glass industry's history in the local area. This informal group advocated strongly for creation of a museum, raised funds and began purchasing pieces of historical glass intended for the museum.

An application for incorporation of The West Virginia Museum of American Glass, Ltd. in the state of West Virginia was signed and notarized on April 15, 1993. A state charter as a non-profit was granted on May 7, 1993. On July 24, 1994, tax exempt status under Section 501(c)(3) of the Internal Revenue Code was granted. Later, the Lewis County Chamber of Commerce contracted with the Marshall University Center for Business and Economic Research in Huntington, West Virginia, to conduct a feasibility study of the economic impact of a major glass museum in West Virginia.

A 1995 proposal to house the Museum in either the abandoned West Virginia owned Weston State Hospital (Trans-Allegheny Lunatic Asylum) or former Danser Hardware & Supply Company building, both in Weston, was drawn-up. Neither building was available but on October 1, 1996, a state grant was received to purchase a building to house the Museum.

In the winter of 1996, Museum owned glassware, purchased and donated by the Weston Area Glass History and Study Group, was displayed in the Penny Saved Antiques Mall, in the former JCPenney's building, at 230 Main Avenue in Weston. Later on April 25, 1998, the West Virginia Museum of American Glass, Ltd opened to the public in the former Cain's Drug Store building at the corner of Main and Second Streets in downtown Weston. This building provided 800 square feet of display area on the ground floor. Due to an ever expanding collection, the Board of Directors eventually determined a larger building was needed. Less than ten years later, an agreement was signed in September, 2006, to purchase the former JCPenney's department store complex at 230 Main Avenue. This has been the Museum's location ever since then.

== Collection ==
Spanning the 19th century through the present time, some 18,000 pieces of virtually every type of American glass are on public display with at least that much additional glassware in open storage, available for research and study. Many clubs and individuals have donated collections and/or display cases to be dedicated to specific kinds of glass. Some past examples are: Steuben Glass from the late Broadway producer Martin Massman's estate; Cameo glass by West Virginia artist Kelsey Murphy and glass paperweights from the Degenhart Museum.

== Research ==
The Dorothy B. Dagherty Research Library contains several thousand glass history and ware identification books, a complete set of American Flint Glass Workers' Union of North America convention proceedings (1878-1996), bound Flint Union circulars (1892-1999) and a full set of the same Union's monthly magazine - The American Flint (1910-2000).

== Archives ==
A large number of ephemera are held to include several hundred original glassware catalogs, original glass factory correspondence, advertisements, photographs, original artwork and production records. The original extensive outgoing correspondence records of the President, Vice-president and Secretary of the American Flint Glass Workers' Union of North America, a unique depository of both glass and labor history. A virtual museum lists over 34,000 glass objects as well as thousands of photographs and archival documents.

== Programs ==
Prior to the Museum's incorporation, a regional glass history conference was held in Weston in 1992. Now known as the Glass Gathering, a two-day research conference that alternates between Weston and a different geographic location every other year, has been sponsored by the Museum every year since its inception. Other annual activities include an American Mid Century Modern Glass Symposium and meetings of The Ancient and Honorable Order of Glass Flakes, an invitation only group of internationally known glass researchers and authors.

== Publications ==
Publications include a quarterly magazine, All About Glass, (1993–present), a series of monographs on various glass topics (over 150 titles), and a book publishing imprint, The Glass Flakes Press, which has published 10 titles since its inception in 2013.
