= Pickle Street, West Virginia =

- Unincorporated community
- Location within the state of West Virginia Pickle Street (the United States)
- Coordinates: 39°1′10″N 80°41′40″W
- Country: United States
- State: West Virginia
- County: Lewis
- Elevation: 797 ft (243 m)
- Time zone: UTC-5 (Eastern (EST))
  - Summer (DST): UTC-4 (EDT)
- GNIS ID: 1544800

Pickle Street is an unincorporated community in Lewis County, West Virginia, United States, on U.S. Route 33 along Leading Creek. It is mostly a residential area, but it has an auction house.
