= Raccoon, Pennsylvania =

Unincorporated community in Pennsylvania, US

Coordinates: 40.6050°N 80.3687°W

Taylorstown, Pennsylvania
- Unincorporated community
- Interactive map of Taylorstown, Pennsylvania
- Country: United States
- State: Pennsylvania
- County: Washington
- Time zone: UTC-5 (Eastern (EST))
  - Summer (DST): UTC-4 (EDT)

Raccoon is an unincorporated community in Washington County, Pennsylvania, United States. It is home to the Lyle Covered Bridge.
