= Jackson's Mill Covered Bridge =

Jackson's Mill Covered Bridge may refer to:

- Jacksons Mill Covered Bridge (Bedford County, Pennsylvania)
- Jackson's Mill Covered Bridge (Washington County, Pennsylvania)
- Jackson's Sawmill Covered Bridge, Lancaster County, Pennsylvania
