= Leading Creek (Little Kanawha River tributary) =

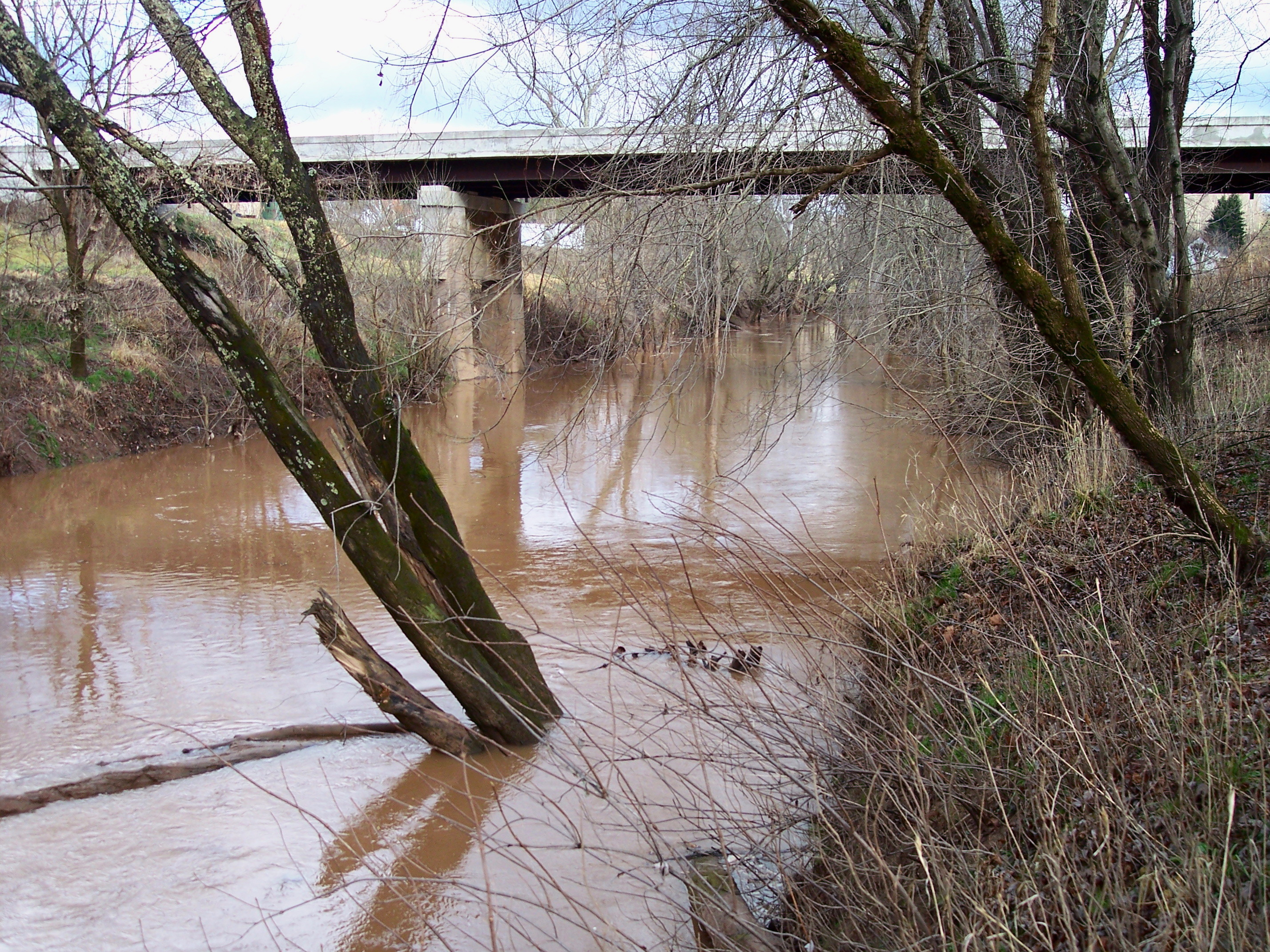
- Leading Creek at its mouth in Gilmer County in 2006

- Location of the mouth of Leading Creek in Gilmer County, West Virginia

Location
- Country: United States
- State: West Virginia
- Counties: Lewis, Gilmer

Physical characteristics
- Source
  - location: near Camden, Lewis County
  - coordinates: 39.0528699°N 80.5750948°W
  - elevation: 1,120 ft (340 m)
- Mouth: Little Kanawha River
  - location: Gilmer County
  - coordinates: 38.9467562°N 80.8770491°W
  - elevation: 696 ft (212 m)
- Length: 28.6 mi (46.0 km)
- Basin size: 147 mi^{2} (380 km^{2})
- Discharge
  - location: a site 1.4 mi (2.3 km) upstream of mouth
  - average: 220 cu ft/s (6.2 m^{3}/s)
  - minimum: 0.1 cu ft/s (0.0028 m^{3}/s)
  - maximum: 12,100 cu ft/s (340 m^{3}/s)

Leading Creek is a tributary of the Little Kanawha River, 28.6 miles (46.0 km) long, in central West Virginia in the United States. Via the Little Kanawha and Ohio rivers, it is part of the watershed of the Mississippi River, draining an area of 147 square miles (380 km^{2}) in a rural region on the unglaciated portion of the Allegheny Plateau.

Leading Creek rises just west of Camden in Lewis County and flows west-southwestward into Gilmer County, through the unincorporated communities of Alum Bridge and Pickle Street in Lewis County and Linn and Troy in Gilmer County. It flows into the Little Kanawha River approximately 2.4 miles (3.9 km) west-northwest of Glenville.

Between Camden and Troy, the creek's course is paralleled by the Staunton and Parkersburg Turnpike, along present-day U.S. routes 33 and 119 between Camden and Linn; and West Virginia Route 47 between Linn and Troy.

According to the West Virginia Department of Environmental Protection, approximately 84% of the Leading Creek watershed is forested, mostly deciduous. Approximately 15% is used for pasture and agriculture.

According to the Geographic Names Information System, Leading Creek has also been known historically by the spelling "Leeding Creek." According to tradition, Leading Creek was so named by explorers who used it to navigate.

== Flow rate ==
At a United States Geological Survey stream gauge 1.4 miles (2.3 km) upstream from the creek's mouth, the annual mean flow of the creek between 1937 and 1951 was 220 cubic feet per second (6.2 cubic metres per second). The highest recorded flow during the period was 12,100 cu ft/s (340 m^{3}/s) on June 25, 1950. The lowest recorded flow was 0.1 cu ft/s (0.0028 m^{3}/s) on several days in September 1939.

== See also ==
- List of rivers of West Virginia
