= Alum Fork =

River in the United States of America

Coordinates: 39°02′21″N 80°39′41″W

Alum Fork is a stream in the U.S. state of West Virginia. It is a tributary of Leading Creek.

The water of Alum Fork is impregnated with alum, hence the name.

== See also ==
- List of rivers of West Virginia
