= Cummins Jackson =

American counterfeiter (1802–1849)

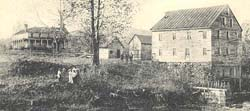
Jackson's Mill, owned by Cummins Jackson

Cummins Edward Jackson (July 25, 1802 – December 4, 1849) was a paternal half-uncle of Confederate General Thomas Jonathan "Stonewall" Jackson (1824–1863) and a half-brother of David Edward Jackson. He owned and operated a grist mill at Jackson's Mill, Virginia (now West Virginia).

Jackson was born at Jackson's Mill, the eldest son of Edward Jackson (1759–1828) and his second wife. He was 26 when his father died and he inherited the mill. Some of the family members claim he seized control and refused to share any of the estate; they sued to get their fair shares, but the case was never settled. Stonewall Jackson biographer James Robertson described Cummins as "unscrupulous and vindictive ... absurdly litigious", having a strong fondness for gambling, horse racing, and drinking, and he quotes an acquaintance calling Cummins a "rascal". In 1835 Cummins arbitrarily constructed a 6-foot (1.8 m) high dam stretching 150 feet (46 m) across the West Fork River, needing additional power, but he disregarded the needs of his neighbors downstream. They also sued him, but that apparently was unsuccessful because the dam still stands.

Into this environment, 6 year-old Thomas Jackson and his younger sister Laura Ann went to live with Cummins Jackson in 1830, following the death of their father in 1826. Cummins's brother, Clarksburg attorney Jonathan Jackson (1790–1826), had died of typhoid fever. The children's mother, Julia Neale Jackson (1789–1831), died in 1831, leaving her children orphaned.

Although some biographies of Stonewall Jackson portray Cummins as a "father figure", this does not characterize the relationship adequately. The young boy called him "Uncle", but thought of him more as an elder brother. Historians believe Jackson's low morals had a notable negative effect on the developing boy. But Jackson helped both children survive, and his guardianship appeared to help Thomas develop a strong work ethic around the mill. The youth also developed riding skills while racing his uncle's blooded horses at the four-mile (6 km) racetrack Jackson built nearby.

Young Thomas lived there until 1842 when he was appointed to the United States Military Academy at West Point, New York. He later served in the U.S. Army, was an instructor at Virginia Military Institute. During the American Civil War, he joined the Confederate Army. There he became the right hand of Confederate General Robert E. Lee and advanced to the rank of general. He died from a wound in "friendly fire" in the Battle of Chancellorsville in 1863.

In 1844, as Thomas was halfway through West Point, Cummins Jackson discovered a small vein of silver near his property. He began to counterfeit half-dollar coins of lead with a thin coat of silver. After several months a federal grand jury indicted Jackson for forgery and 26 counts of counterfeiting. The forgery trial was delayed by the actions of the defense attorneys until 1848.

That year Jackson escaped from the jailhouse window and traveled to California with one of his nephews and thirteen others to try his hand at prospecting during the California Gold Rush. Jackson struck it rich at a mine near Mount Shasta. But he fell ill, either with pneumonia or typhoid fever, and suffered for almost a month before his death in Shasta County, California. He is buried there in an unmarked grave. The nephew who accompanied him is said to have gambled away all of the gold profits and returned penniless to Virginia.
