= Crawford, West Virginia =

Unincorporated community in West Virginia, United States

- Unincorporated community
- Location within West Virginia Location within the United States
- Coordinates: 38°52′19″N 80°26′12″W
- Country: United States
- State: West Virginia
- County: Lewis
- Elevation: 1,099 ft (335 m)
- Time zone: UTC-5 (Eastern (EST))
  - Summer (DST): UTC-4 (EDT)
- ZIP code: 26343
- Area codes: 304 & 681
- GNIS feature ID: 1554217

Crawford is an unincorporated community in Lewis County, West Virginia, United States. Crawford is 11.5 miles (18.5 km) south-southeast of Weston. Crawford had a post office, which closed on January 21, 1989; it still has its own ZIP code, 26343.

The community was named in honor of a pioneer settler.
