= Weston Downtown Residential Historic District =

Historic district in West Virginia, United States

- U.S. National Register of Historic Places
- U.S. Historic district
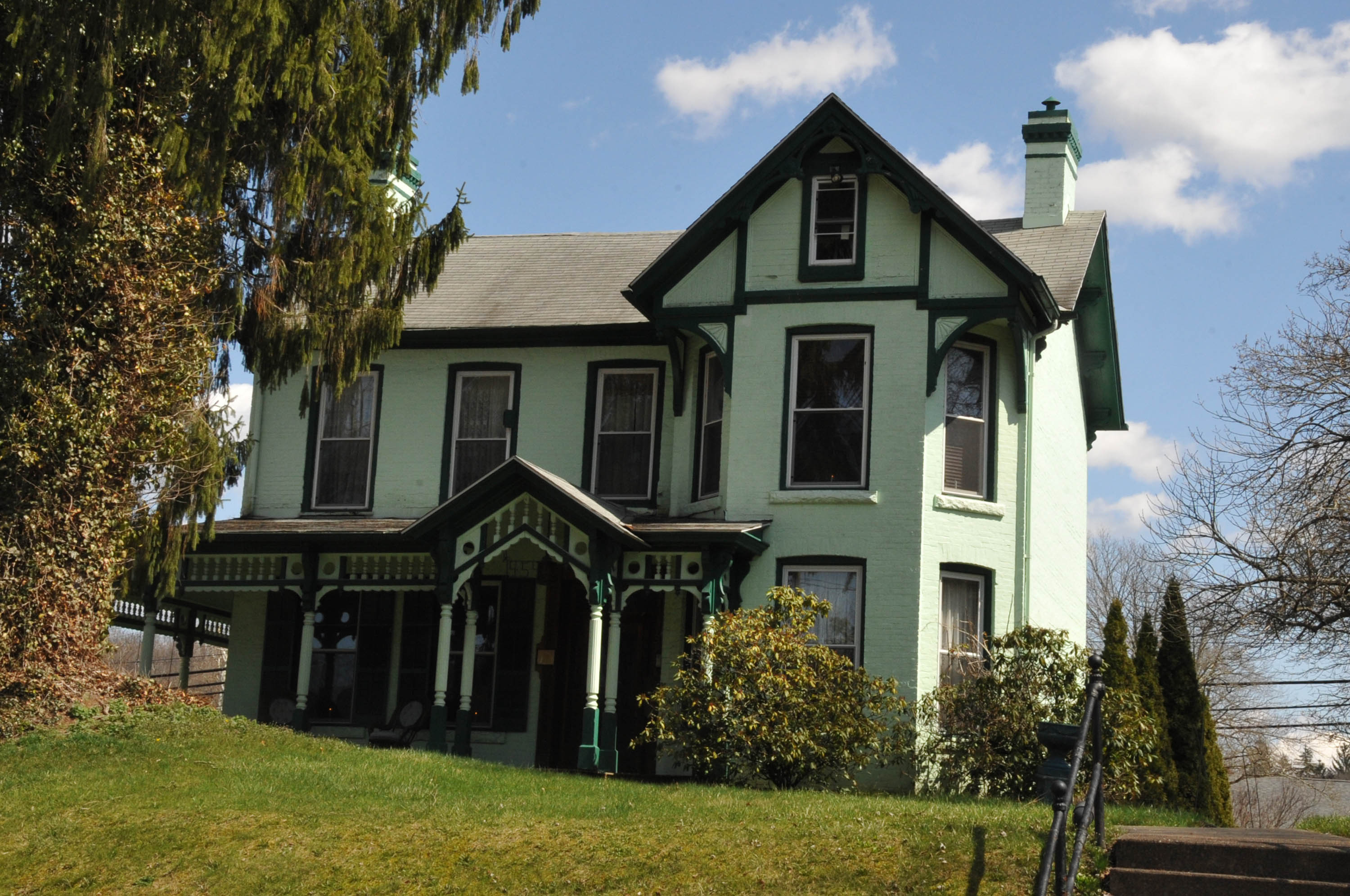

- Location within West Virginia Location within the United States
- Location: Portions of Main, Center, and Court Aves, East First, East Third, East Fourth, East Fifth and East Sixth Sts., Weston, West Virginia
- Coordinates: 39°2′32″N 80°27′47″W
- Area: 60 acres (24 ha)
- Architectural style: Late Victorian, Late 19th And Early 20th Century American Movements
- NRHP reference No.: 04001596
- Added to NRHP: February 2, 2005

Weston Downtown Residential Historic District is a national historic district located at Weston, Lewis County, West Virginia. The district includes 193 contributing buildings and 3 contributing structures in a primarily residential district. The dwellings are generally two-story and rest on stone foundations. They are reflective of popular architectural styles from the 19th and early-20th centuries. The earliest house dates to 1839. The district includes the separately listed Weston Colored School.

It was listed on the National Register of Historic Places in 2005.
