= Weston Colored School =

- U.S. National Register of Historic Places
- U.S. Historic district – Contributing property
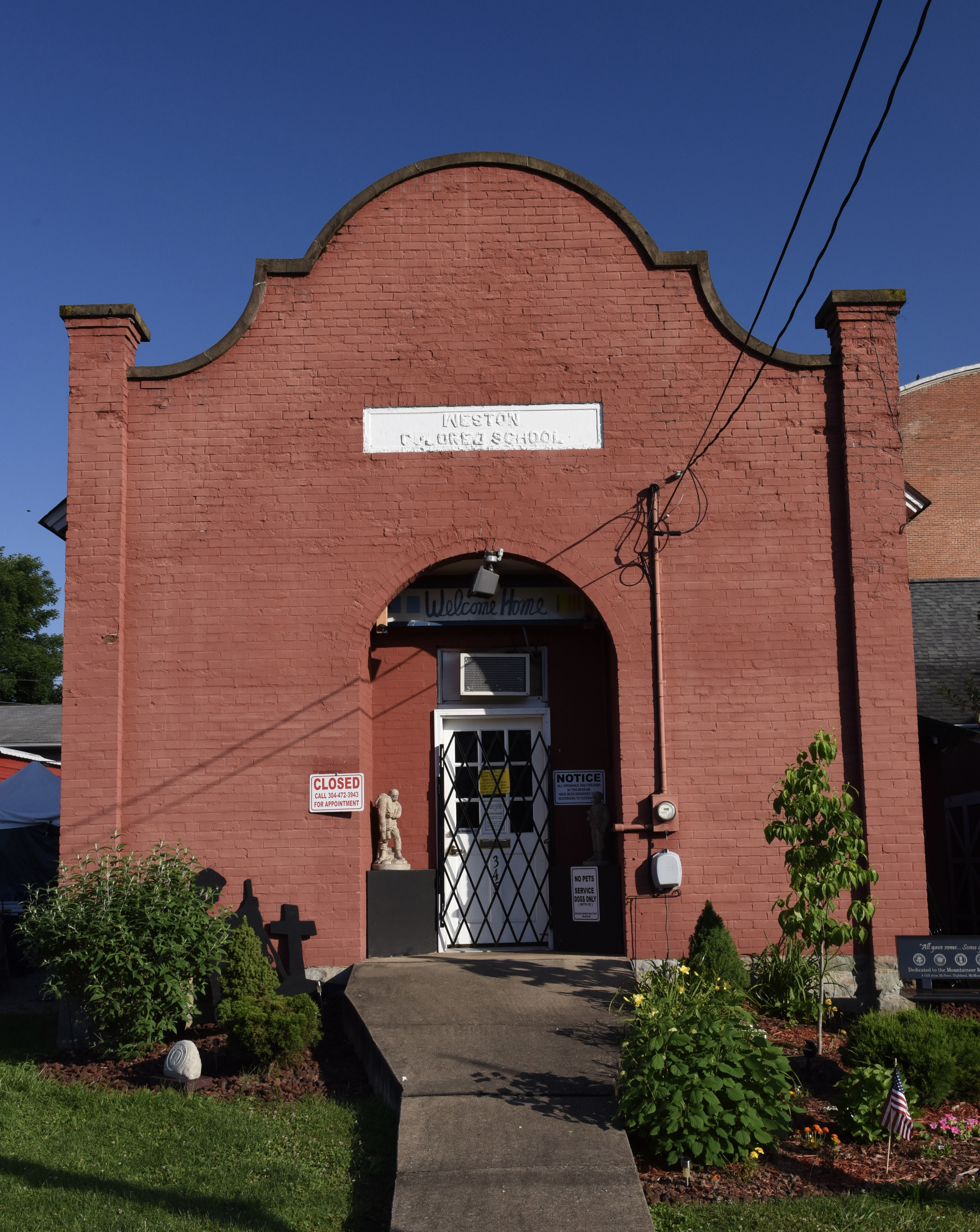

- Location within West Virginia Location within the United States
- Location: 345 Center St., Weston, West Virginia
- Coordinates: 39°2′23″N 80°27′53″W
- Area: less than one acre
- Architectural style: Mission/Spanish Revival
- Part of: Weston Downtown Residential Historic District (ID04001596)
- NRHP reference No.: 93000224

Significant dates
- Added to NRHP: April 9, 1993
- Designated CP: February 2, 2005

Weston Colored School, also known as the Central West Virginia Genealogical & Historical Library and Museum and Frontier School, is a historic one-room school building located at Weston, Lewis County, West Virginia. It was built in 1882, and is a single-story rubbed red brick building on a fieldstone foundation. It originally measured 22 by 28 feet (6.7 by 8.5 m), then enlarged in 1928 by 12.5 feet (3.8 m) to the east. It was used as an educational facility for the community's African-American youth until desegregation in 1954. It was subsequently used for storage, then an agricultural classroom for the Lewis County High School, and as a shop for mentally disabled students. It afterwards was used by the Central West Virginia Genealogical & Historical Library and Museum.

It was listed on the National Register of Historic Places in 1993. It is located in the Weston Downtown Residential Historic District, listed in 2005.
