= Jackson's Mill Covered Bridge (Washington County, Pennsylvania) =

- U.S. National Register of Historic Places
- Washington County History & Landmarks Foundation Landmark
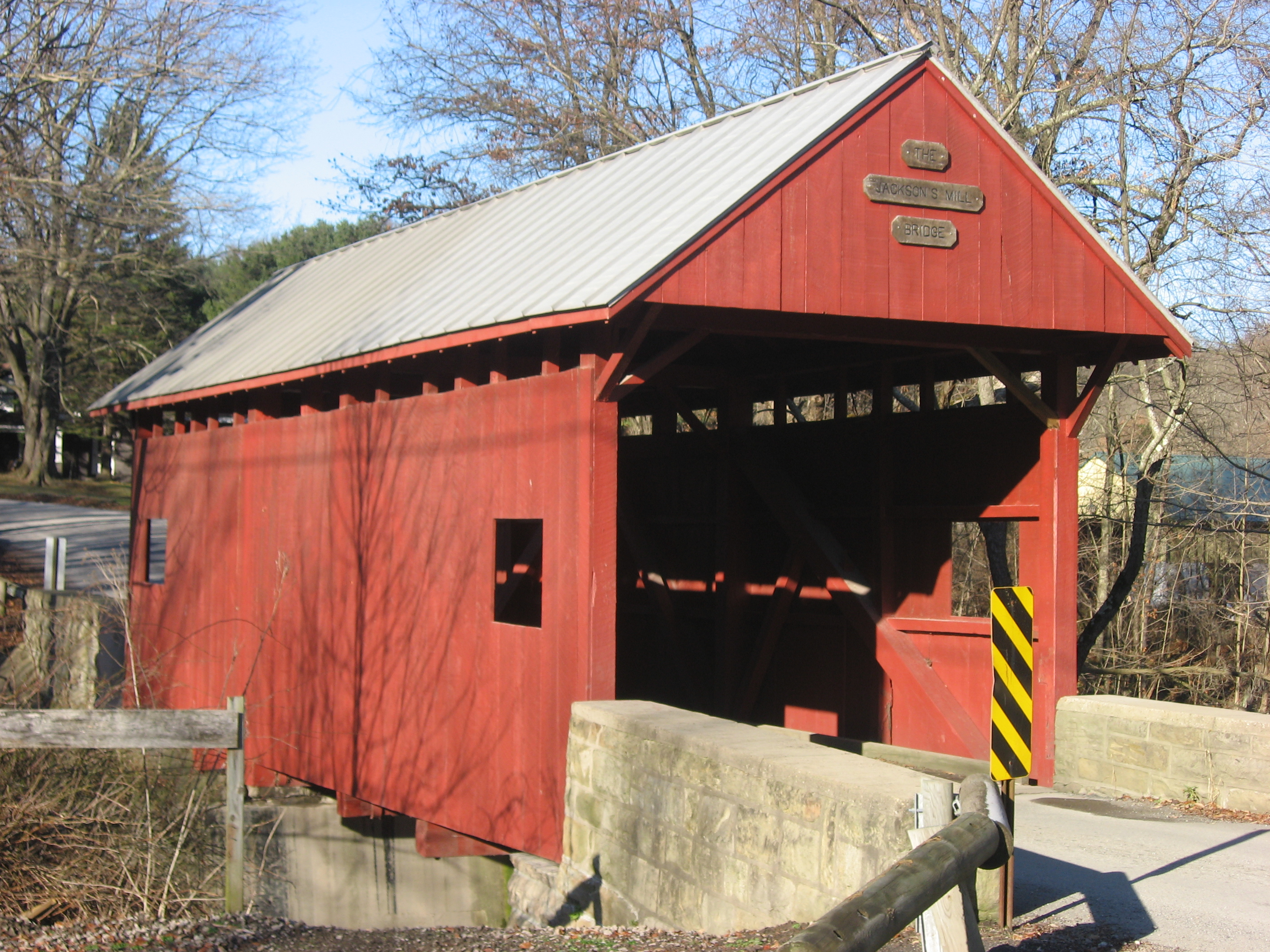
- Jackson's Mill Covered Bridge in 2010

- Location within Pennsylvania Location within the United States
- Nearest city: Burgettstown, Pennsylvania
- Coordinates: 40°20′29″N 80°29′23″W
- Area: 0.1 acres (0.040 ha)
- Architectural style: Queenpost truss
- MPS: Covered Bridges of Washington and Greene Counties TR
- NRHP reference No.: 79003830
- Added to NRHP: June 22, 1979

The Jackson's Mill Covered Bridge is a historic covered bridge in Hanover Township, Pennsylvania.

It is designated as a historic bridge by the Washington County History & Landmarks Foundation.
