= Weston Downtown Historic District =

Historic district in West Virginia, United States

- U.S. National Register of Historic Places
- U.S. Historic district
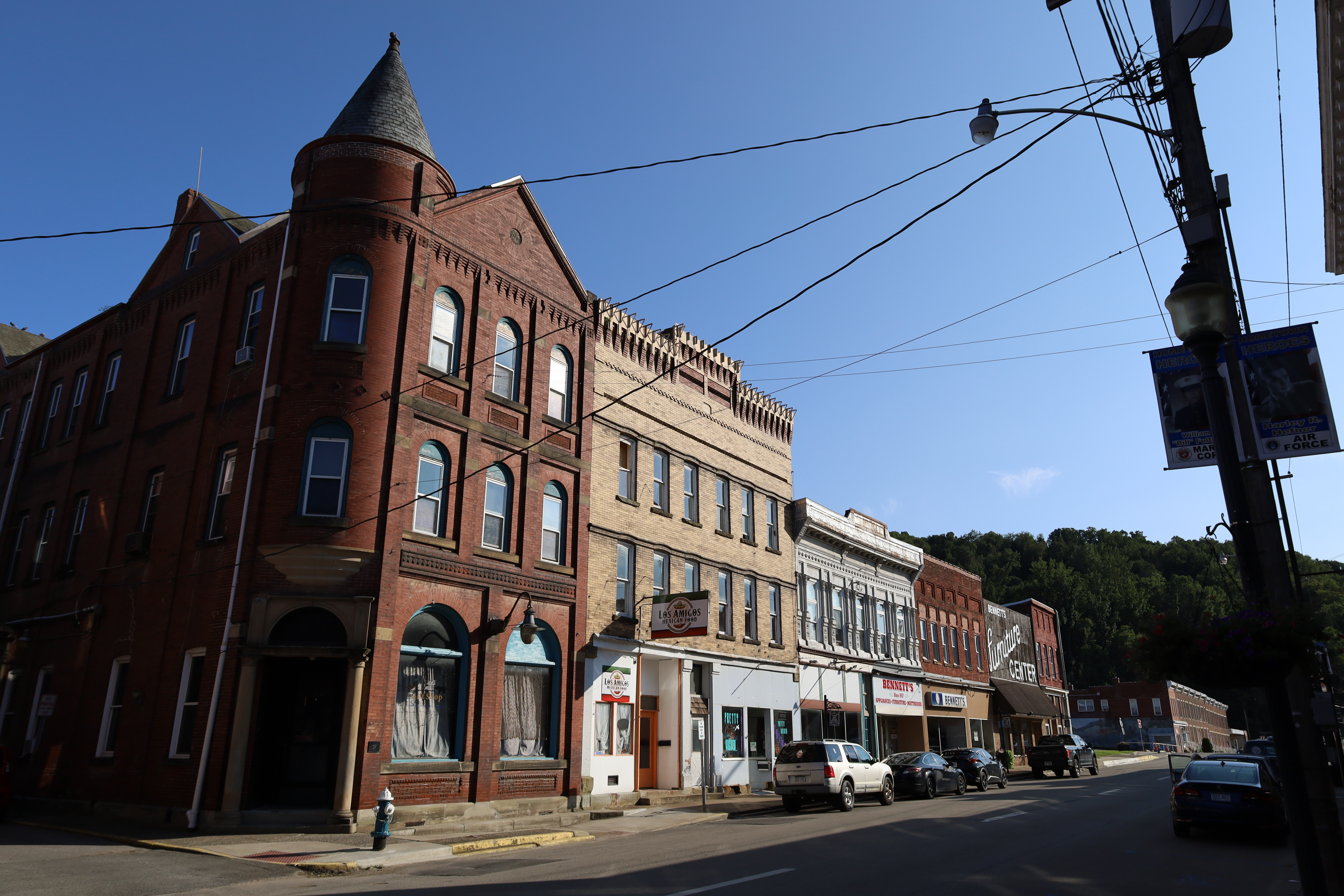
- Buildings in Weston Downtown Historic District in 2021

- Location within West Virginia Location within the United States
- Location: Parts of Main, Center & Court Aves., Second & Third Sts., Weston, West Virginia
- Coordinates: 39°2′13″N 80°28′5″W
- Area: 29 acres (12 ha)
- Built: 1875
- Architect: Multiple; Yellin, Samuel
- Architectural style: Second Empire, Art Deco, Italianate
- NRHP reference No.: 85002468
- Added to NRHP: September 28, 1985

Weston Downtown Historic District is a national historic district located at Weston, Lewis County, West Virginia. The district includes 58 contributing buildings in the central business district of Weston. Most of the buildings were built between 1875 and 1920, with the earliest dating to about 1845. Notable buildings include the U.S. Post Office (1933–1934), the Art Deco style Citizens Bank of Weston (1930), B&O Railroad Depot / Weston Municipal Building, Camden Building-Weston National Bank (1896–1897), Old Citizen's Bank Building (1893), Bennett House (c. 1830s), Fuccy-Koblegard Building (c. 1901-1905), and the East and West Second Street Truss Bridge (1922). The district includes the separately listed Jonathan M. Bennett House.

It was listed on the National Register of Historic Places in 1985.
