= Buddy Hayes (musician) =

- Birth name: Theodore Harmon Hayes
- Born: August 1, 1916; Weston, West Virginia, U.S.
- Died: April 26, 1997 (aged 80); Coos Bay, Oregon, U.S.
- Genres: Jazz, big band
- Instrument(s): Tuba, double bass, bass guitar

Theodore Harmon "Buddy" Hayes (August 1, 1916 – April 26, 1997) was an American big band musician who was a member of the Lawrence Welk orchestra. His instruments were the bass and the tuba.

== Early life ==
Born in Weston, West Virginia, in a family of performers, he first started performing at age four with his parents' band.

== Career ==
Hayes joined the Welk Orchestra in 1954, a year before the Welk show went on national television, after a stint in the United States Army and with several other bands in the Greater Los Angeles area. During his tenure with the Maestro's band and television show, in addition to playing the bass and tuba also was a featured vocalist in comedic and novelty numbers. He remained with the Welk organization until his departure in 1966.

== Personal life ==
He continued to perform live and collected and restored old string basses until his death in 1997 at his home in Coos Bay, Oregon.

== Discography ==
With Stan Kenton

- The Kenton Era (Capitol, 1940–54, 1955)

== Filmography ==
=== Film ===
Year	Title	Role	Notes
1947	Law of the Canyon	Bass player	Uncredited
1947	The Stranger from Ponca City	'Jug' Player	Uncredited

=== Television ===
Year	Title	Role	Notes
1955–1968	The Lawrence Welk Show	Bass player	29 episodes
2007	Lawrence Welk's TV Treasures	—	Television film
