= Jonathan M. Bennett House =

Historic house in West Virginia, United States

- U.S. National Register of Historic Places
- U.S. Historic district – Contributing property
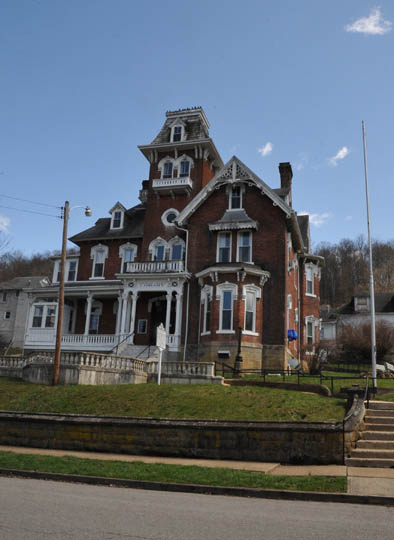

- Location within West Virginia Location within the United States
- Location: Court Ave., Weston, West Virginia
- Coordinates: 39°2′11″N 80°27′55″W
- Area: 1 acre (0.40 ha)
- Built: 1874
- Architectural style: Italianate
- Part of: Weston Downtown Historic District (ID85002468)
- NRHP reference No.: 78002804

Significant dates
- Added to NRHP: June 9, 1978
- Designated CP: September 28, 1985

Jonathan M. Bennett House, also known as Louis Bennett Public Library, is a historic home located at Weston, Lewis County, West Virginia. Its name reflects its builder, Jonathan M. Bennett, who represented Lewis County in the Virginia General Assembly and served as state auditor before the American Civil War. Bennett was a prominent local lawyer and businessman, who was allowed to hold office in West Virginia following its adoption of a new state Constitution in 1872. He built this house in 1874–1875; the 17-room mansion reflects the High Victorian Italianate style. It features a 4 1/2-story entrance tower with a mansard roof. It also has heavy wooden brackets on the tower and verandah, a balustraded tower balcony, and an elaborate bargeboard. it was left by Mrs. Louis Bennett, Sr., in 1922 to the citizens of Lewis County as a public library and community center.

It was listed on the National Register of Historic Places in 1978. It is located in the Weston Downtown Historic District, listed in 1985.

The papers of Jonathan M. Bennett are housed at the West Virginia & Regional History Center at West Virginia University within A&M 32
