= Lyle Covered Bridge =

- U.S. National Register of Historic Places
- Washington County History & Landmarks Foundation Landmark
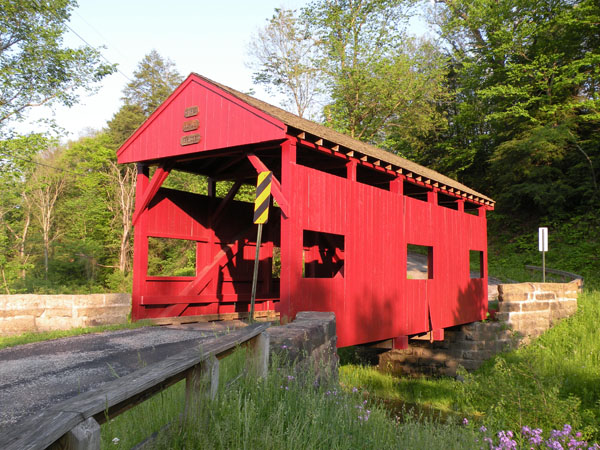
- Lyle Covered Bridge in 2010

- Location within Pennsylvania Location within the United States
- Nearest city: Raccoon, Pennsylvania
- Coordinates: 40°27′15″N 80°22′32″W
- Area: 0.1 acres (0.040 ha)
- Architectural style: Queenpost truss
- MPS: Covered Bridges of Washington and Greene Counties TR
- NRHP reference No.: 79003831
- Added to NRHP: June 22, 1979

The Lyle Covered Bridge is a historic covered bridge in Raccoon, Pennsylvania.

It was built in 1887 and is a 38-foot long, queen post truss bridge. It is on Kramer Road and allows pedestrian and vehicular traffic. It is owned by Washington County.

It is designated as a historic bridge by the Washington County History & Landmarks Foundation.
