= Camden, West Virginia =

Unincorporated community in West Virginia, United States

- Unincorporated community
- Location within West Virginia Location within the United States
- Coordinates: 39°03′16″N 80°33′59″W
- Country: United States
- State: West Virginia
- County: Lewis
- Elevation: 1,102 ft (336 m)
- Time zone: UTC-5 (Eastern (EST))
  - Summer (DST): UTC-4 (EDT)
- ZIP code: 26338
- Area codes: 304 & 681
- GNIS feature ID: 1536876

Camden is an unincorporated community in Lewis County, West Virginia, United States. Camden is located on U.S. routes 33 and 119, 5.5 miles (8.9 km) west-northwest of Weston. Camden has a post office with ZIP code 26338.

The community was named after Johnson N. Camden, a United States senator from West Virginia.
