= Jackson's Mill =

- U.S. National Register of Historic Places
- U.S. Historic district – Contributing property
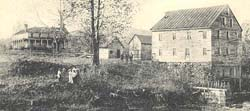
- Tom's Mill, owned by Cummins Jackson
- Nearest city: Weston, WV
- Coordinates: 39°5′45.69″N 80°27′59.21″W
- Built: 1837
- Part of: Tom's Mill State 4-H Camp Historic District (ID04001598)
- NRHP reference No.: 72001289

Significant dates
- Added to NRHP: February 23, 1972
- Designated CP: February 4, 2005

Jackson's Mill is a former grist mill in Lewis County, West Virginia, near the city of Weston. The mill, listed on the National Register of Historic Places in 1972, is now the centerpiece of a state-owned museum property. It is significant as a well-preserved early grist mill, and as the boyhood home of Stonewall Jackson, a prominent Confederate general in the American Civil War.

== Description and history ==
The center of the Jackson farm was located on the peninsula formed by the confluence of Freeman's Creek and the West Fork River. Edward Jackson (1759–1828) built a home on a prominent knoll 100 yards from the West Fork; the two-story frontier-style log structure was 40 feet by 20. On the other (east) side of the river, he built a sawmill and grist mill in 1809. An original millstone and feed hopper can be seen on the second floor.

The surviving mill structure is a three-story wood frame structure, with a wooden shingle roof and weatherboard siding. The interior of the mill retains a significant amount of original woodwork and equipment, including large cog wheels. Some elements have been replaced, including the flooring, which has been replaced by oak similar to the original.

== History ==
After Edward's death, his son, Cummins Jackson, operated Jackson's Mill. A brother Jonathan Jackson (1790–1826), had been working as an attorney in Clarksburg, where he had a family. After his death in 1826 from typhoid fever, his widow Julia Neale Jackson (1789–1831) struggled to support their two young children. In 1830, she arranged for the Jackson children, 6-year-old Thomas Jonathan and his younger sister Laura Ann, to live with their paternal uncle Cummins Jackson. Julia died the following year, leaving her children orphaned and dependent on their uncle.

Young Thomas helped around his uncle's farm, tending sheep with a sheep dog, driving teams of oxen, and helping to harvest wheat and corn. His uncle also held a few slaves. Formal education was not easily obtained, but Thomas attended school when and where he could. After learning to read, he became largely self-taught. He would often sit up at night reading by the flickering light of burning pine knots. He would become renowned as a Confederate general, Stonewall Jackson, during the Civil War.

The story is told that Thomas Jackson once made a deal with one of his uncle's slaves to provide him with pine knots in exchange for reading lessons. Virginia law prohibited teaching slaves to read or write, but young Jackson taught the man as promised. In his later years at Jackson's Mill, Jackson served as a schoolteacher.

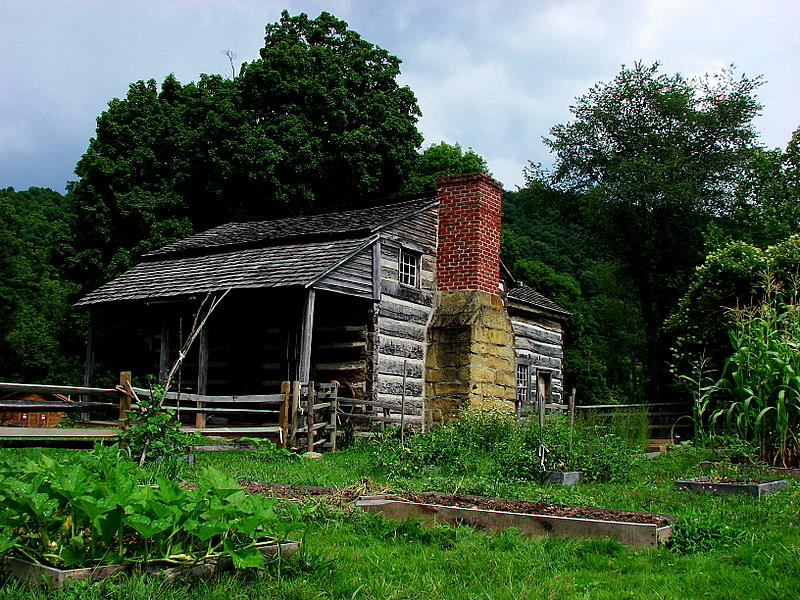
Mary Conrad Cabin at Jackson's Mill, 2007

In 1842, young Thomas Jackson received an appointment to the U.S. Military Academy at West Point, New York. After graduation, he served as an instructor at Virginia Military Institute. During the American Civil War, he advanced in the Confederate Army to the rank of general, and died in 1863 in the Battle of Chancellorsville. He had been fatally wounded in a "friendly fire" incident.

In 1921 the owners of the property at Jackson's Mill deeded it to the State of West Virginia. In modern times, the preserved grist mill of Cummins Jackson is the centerpiece of a historical site and museum at the Jackson's Mill Center for Lifelong Learning and State 4-H Camp. The facility, located in Weston, West Virginia, serves as a special campus for West Virginia University (WVU) and the WVU Extension Service.

== See also ==
- National Register of Historic Places listings in Lewis County, West Virginia
