= Jackson's Mill State 4-H Camp Historic District =

Historic district in West Virginia, United States

- U.S. National Register of Historic Places
- U.S. Historic district
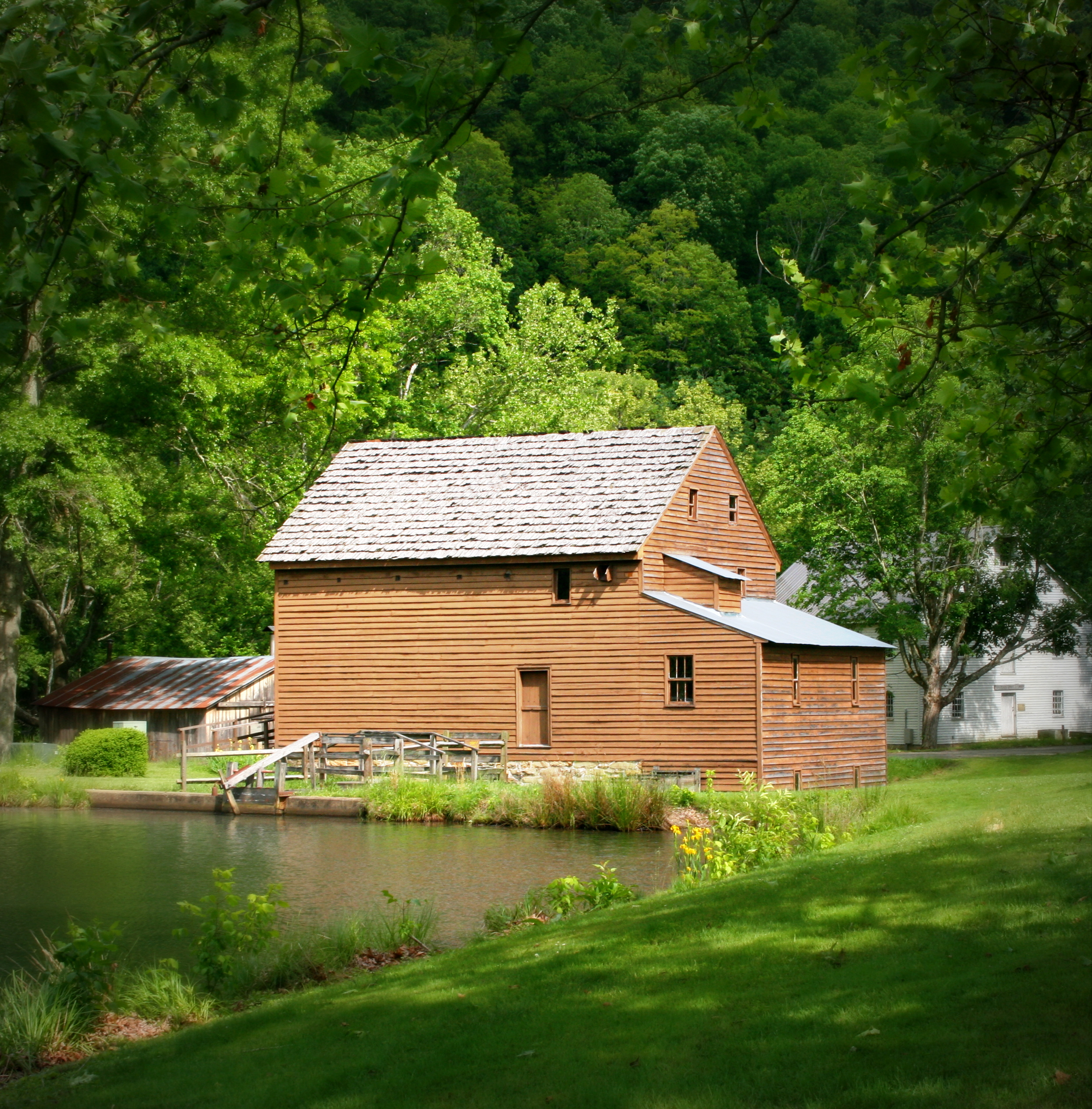
- Blaker's Mill

- Location within West Virginia Location within the United States
- Location: 160 Jackson Mill Rd., near Weston, West Virginia
- Coordinates: 39°5′55″N 80°28′12″W
- Area: 74 acres (30 ha)
- Built: 1921
- Architect: William H. Kendrick; Tell W. Nicolet; R.A. Gillis; T.D. Gray; Albert Saurbourn; Frederic Faris
- Architectural style: Colonial Revival, Bungalow/American Craftsman
- NRHP reference No.: 04001598
- Added to NRHP: February 4, 2005

Jackson's Mill State 4-H Camp Historic District, also known as West Virginia University Jackson's Mill, is a historic 4-H camp and national historic district near Weston, Lewis County, West Virginia. The district includes 23 contributing buildings, 4 contributing sites, 4 contributing structures, and 2 contributing objects. The camp was established in 1921 as the first statewide 4-H camp in the United States. The district includes buildings related to the site's inception as a homestead and agricultural area as well as its current manifestation as a youth camp facility and conference center.

Notable contributing resources include the Mount Vernon Dining Hall (1926), Assembly Hall (1923), West Virginia Building (1934), Council Circle (1922), Amphitheatre (1940), Vesper Rock (1925), Teepi Shrine (1949), Dominion Trail (1942), 15 residential cottages, the Southeastern Learning Center (c. 1940), Electric Energy Center (1940), Dorsey Resource Center (1978), Registration Office/Old Health Center (1950), Old Administration Building (1952), McWhorter Cabin (1793, 1927), Informal Garden (c. 1934), Jackson Homestead Marker (1915), Jackson Spring (1922), Camp Gates (1942), Camp Green (1922), Maintenance Garage (1935), and Annette S. Boggs STEAM Education Center (2021). It is co-located with the separately listed Jackson's Mill. The property was the boyhood home of Confederate General Thomas “Stonewall” Jackson from 1831 to 1842.

It was listed on the National Register of Historic Places in 2005.
