= Weston, West Virginia =

City in West Virginia, US

- City
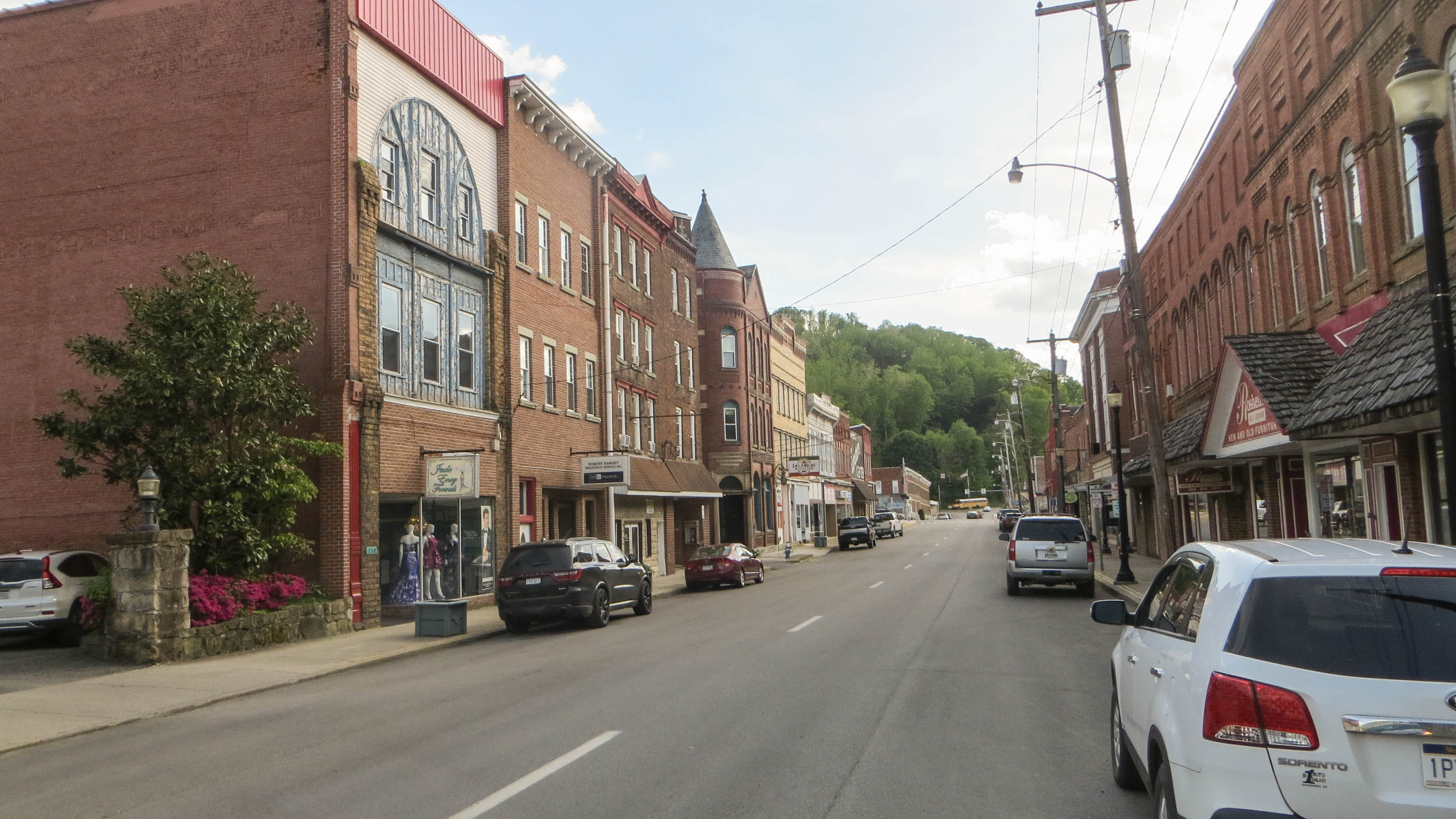
- Main Avenue
- Interactive map of Weston, West Virginia
- Location within West Virginia Location within the United States
- Coordinates: 39°2′31″N 80°28′12″W
- Country: United States
- State: West Virginia
- County: Lewis
- Incorporated: January 14, 1846

Government
  - Mayor: Kim Harrison

Area
  - Total: 1.99 sq mi (5.16 km^{2})
  - Land: 1.94 sq mi (5.03 km^{2})
  - Water: 0.050 sq mi (0.13 km^{2})
- Elevation: 1,020 ft (311 m)

Population (2020)
  - Total: 3,952
  - Estimate (2021): 3,890
  - Density: 1,984.2/sq mi (766.11/km^{2})
- Time zone: UTC-5 (Eastern (EST))
  - Summer (DST): UTC-4 (EDT)
- ZIP code: 26452
- Area code: 304
- FIPS code: 54-85972
- GNIS feature ID: 1548967
- Website: www.cityofwestonwv.gov

Weston is a city in and the county seat of Lewis County, West Virginia, United States. The population was 3,943 at the 2020 census. It is home to the Museum of American Glass in West Virginia and the Trans-Allegheny Lunatic Asylum.

== History ==
Weston was founded in 1818 as Preston; the name was changed to Fleshersville soon after, and then to Weston in 1819. The city was incorporated in 1846.

Weston is the site of the former Trans-Allegheny Lunatic Asylum, a psychiatric hospital and National Historic Landmark which has been mostly vacant since its closure in 1994 upon its replacement by the nearby William R. Sharpe Jr. Hospital. Jackson's Mill, a childhood home of Stonewall Jackson, is approximately four miles (6 km) north of Weston; it has been operated as a 4-H facility since the 1920s and is also the site of a conference center operated by the West Virginia University Extension Service. It is listed on the National Register of Historic Places as the Jackson's Mill State 4-H Camp Historic District.

Weston has two national historic districts: the Weston Downtown Historic District and Weston Downtown Residential Historic District. Other buildings on the National Register of Historic Places are the Jonathan M. Bennett House and the former Weston Colored School.

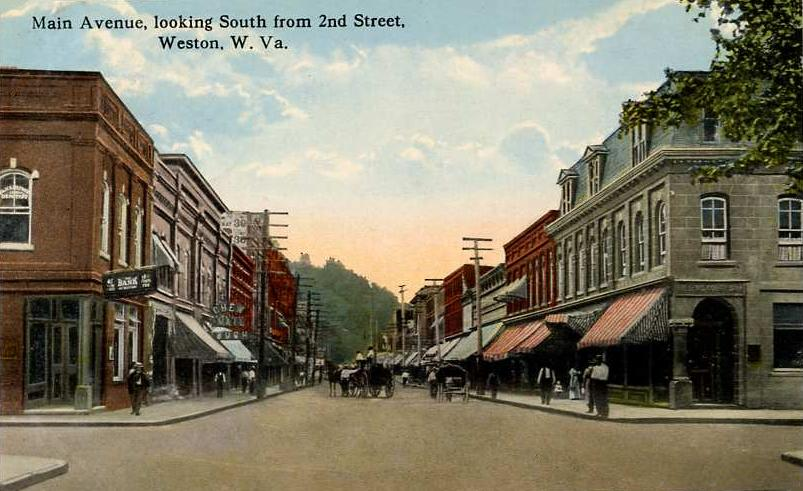
Main Avenue c. 1912

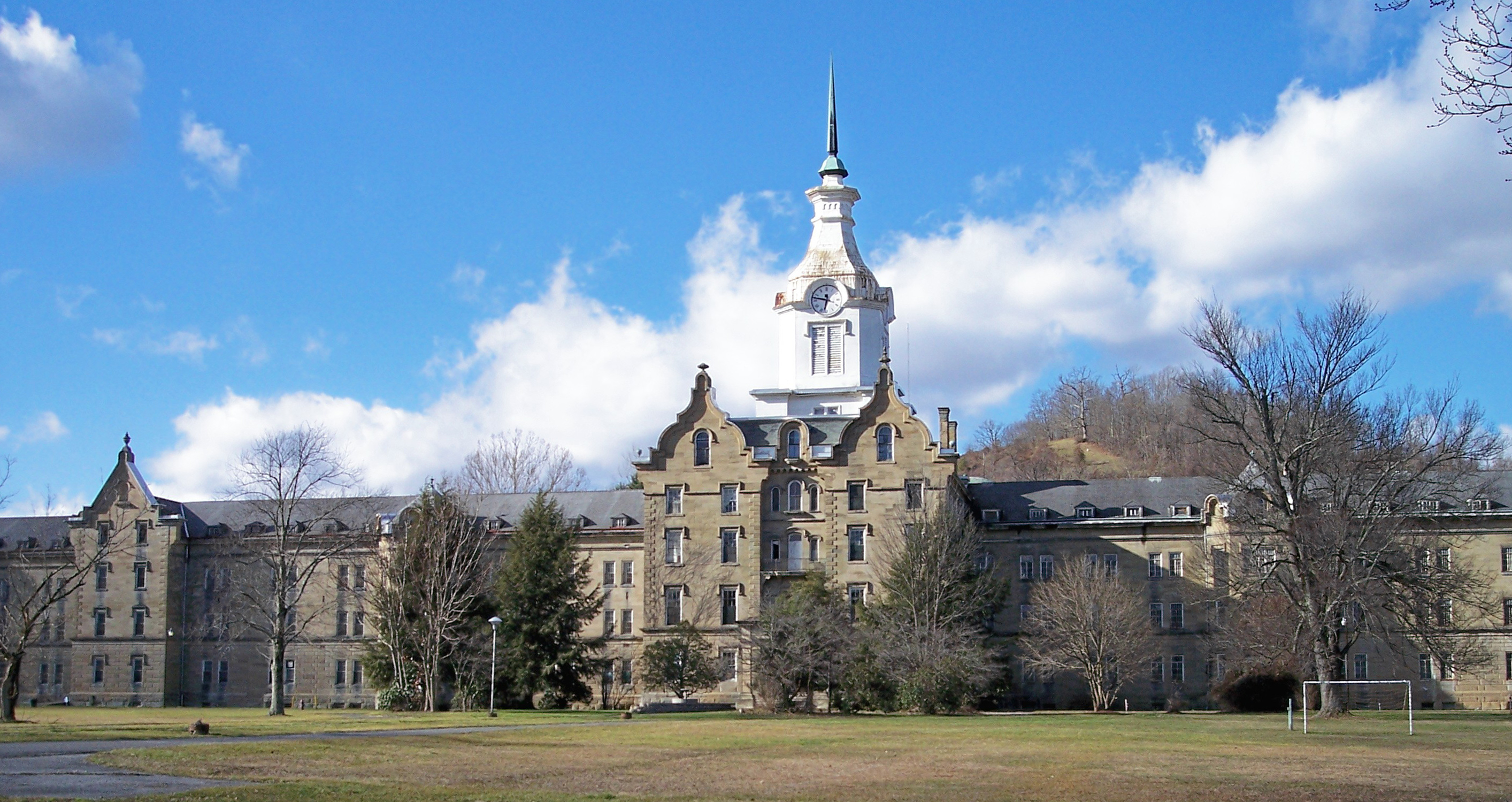
Weston State Hospital

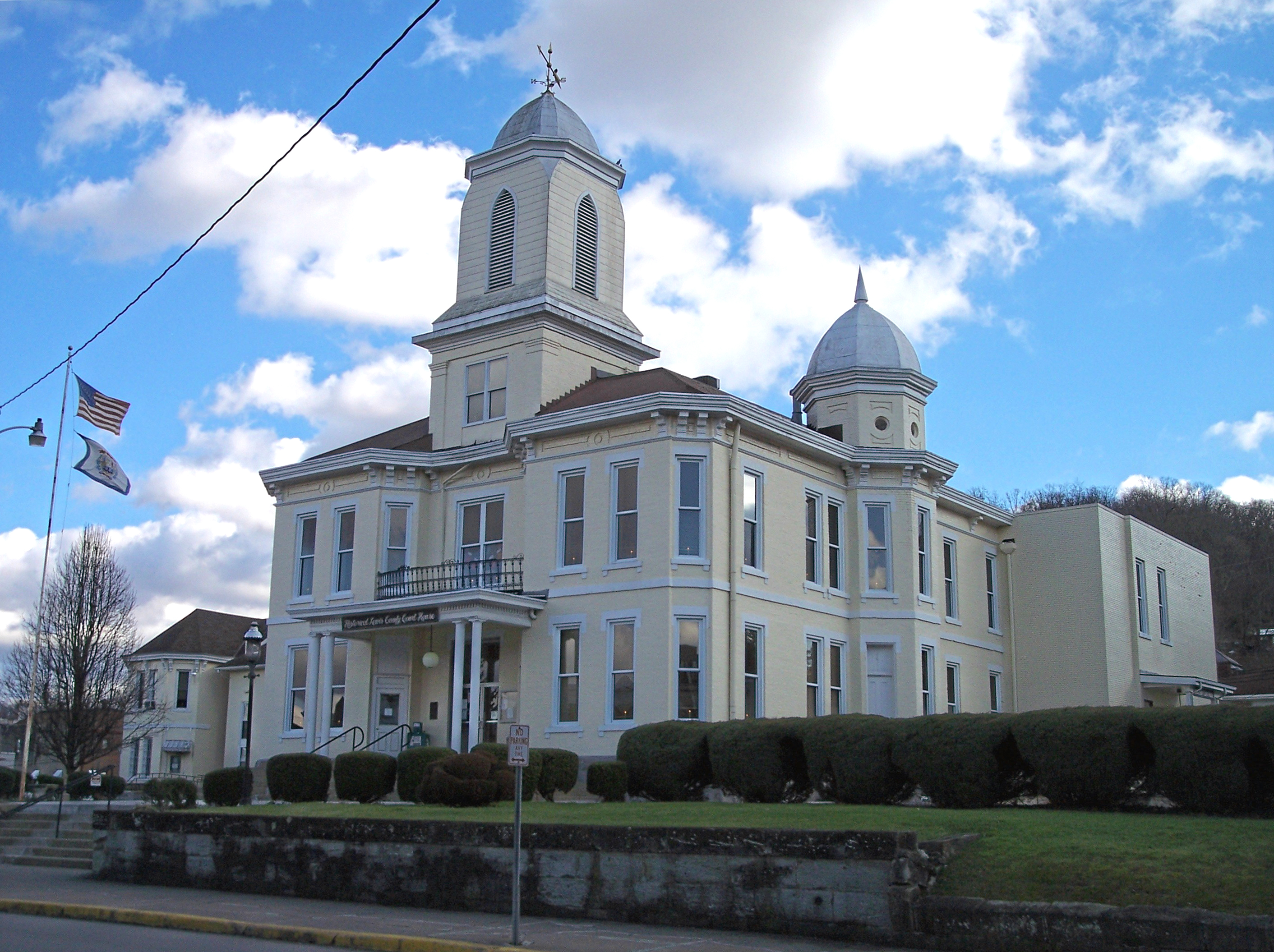
Lewis County Courthouse

== Geography ==
Weston is located 15 miles (24 km) west of Buckhannon and 20 miles (32 km) south of Clarksburg at 39°2′31″N 80°28′12″W (39.041857, -80.469929), along the West Fork River at its confluence with Stonecoal Creek in North Central West Virginia.

According to the United States Census Bureau, the city has a total area of 2.00 square miles (5.18 km^{2}), of which 1.95 square miles (5.05 km^{2}) are land and 0.05 square miles (0.13 km^{2}) are water.

The city is crossed by Interstate 79, U.S. Route 19, U.S. Route 33 and U.S. Route 119.

=== Climate ===
The climate in this area is characterized by hot, humid summers and generally mild to cool winters. According to the Köppen Climate Classification system, Weston has a humid subtropical climate, abbreviated "Cfa" on climate maps.

== Demographics ==
Historical population
Census	Pop.	Note	%±
1860	820		—
1870	1,111		35.5%
1880	1,516		36.5%
1890	2,143		41.4%
1900	2,560		19.5%
1910	2,213		−13.6%
1920	5,701		157.6%
1930	8,646		51.7%
1940	8,268		−4.4%
1950	8,945		8.2%
1960	8,754		−2.1%
1970	7,323		−16.3%
1980	6,250		−14.7%
1990	4,994		−20.1%
2000	4,317		−13.6%
2010	4,110		−4.8%
2020	3,952		−3.8%
2021 (est.)	3,890		−1.6%
U.S. Decennial Census

=== 2020 census ===
As of the 2020 census, Weston had a population of 3,952. The median age was 41.5 years. 21.3% of residents were under the age of 18 and 18.9% of residents were 65 years of age or older. For every 100 females there were 95.5 males, and for every 100 females age 18 and over there were 91.6 males age 18 and over.

99.3% of residents lived in urban areas, while 0.7% lived in rural areas.

There were 1,719 households in Weston, of which 25.9% had children under the age of 18 living in them. Of all households, 37.1% were married-couple households, 20.7% were households with a male householder and no spouse or partner present, and 30.9% were households with a female householder and no spouse or partner present. About 35.2% of all households were made up of individuals and 15.2% had someone living alone who was 65 years of age or older.

There were 2,106 housing units, of which 18.4% were vacant. The homeowner vacancy rate was 3.7% and the rental vacancy rate was 16.2%.

Racial composition as of the 2020 census
Race	Number	Percent
White	3,674	93.0%
Black or African American	37	0.9%
American Indian and Alaska Native	4	0.1%
Asian	35	0.9%
Native Hawaiian and Other Pacific Islander	3	0.1%
Some other race	33	0.8%
Two or more races	166	4.2%
Hispanic or Latino (of any race)	73	1.8%

=== 2010 census ===
As of the census of 2010, there were 4,110 people, 1,811 households, and 1,082 families living in the city. The population density was 2,107.7 inhabitants per square mile (813.8/km^{2}). There were 2,135 housing units at an average density of 1,094.9 per square mile (422.7/km^{2}). The racial makeup of the city was 97.0% White, 0.8% African American, 0.7% Asian, and 1.5% from two or more races. Hispanic or Latino of any race were 1.3% of the population.

There were 1,811 households, of which 27.7% had children under the age of 18 living with them, 40.9% were married couples living together, 13.3% had a female householder with no husband present, 5.5% had a male householder with no wife present, and 40.3% were non-families. 33.7% of all households were made up of individuals, and 16.6% had someone living alone who was 65 years of age or older. The average household size was 2.27 and the average family size was 2.86.

The median age in the city was 41.4 years. 22% of residents were under the age of 18; 7.7% were between the ages of 18 and 24; 26.1% were from 25 to 44; 26.2% were from 45 to 64; and 18.1% were 65 years of age or older. The gender makeup of the city was 48.7% male and 51.3% female.

=== 2000 census ===
As of the census of 2000, there were 4,317 people, 1,942 households, and 1,172 families living in the city. The population density was 2,533.5 inhabitants per square mile (980.5/km^{2}). There were 2,222 housing units at an average density of 1,304.0 per square mile (504.7/km^{2}). The racial makeup of the city was 98.24% White, 0.19% African American, 0.09% Native American, 0.72% Asian, 0.19% from other races, and 0.58% from two or more races. Hispanic or Latino of any race were 0.46% of the population.

There were 1,942 households, out of which 24.5% had children under the age of 18 living with them, 44.4% were married couples living together, 13.2% had a female householder with no husband present, and 39.6% were non-families. 34.7% of all households were made up of individuals, and 18.6% had someone living alone who was 65 years of age or older. The average household size was 2.22 and the average family size was 2.84.

In the city, the population was spread out, with 20.3% under the age of 18, 7.9% from 18 to 24, 27.1% from 25 to 44, 24.9% from 45 to 64, and 19.7% who were 65 years of age or older. The median age was 42 years. For every 100 females, there were 83.2 males. For every 100 females age 18 and over, there were 80.4 males.

The median income for a household in the city was $26,690, and the median income for a family was $33,783. Males had a median income of $27,988 versus $17,335 for females. The per capita income for the city was $14,089. About 15.1% of families and 18.8% of the population were below the poverty line, including 25.8% of those under age 18 and 9.3% of those age 65 or over.

== Notable people ==
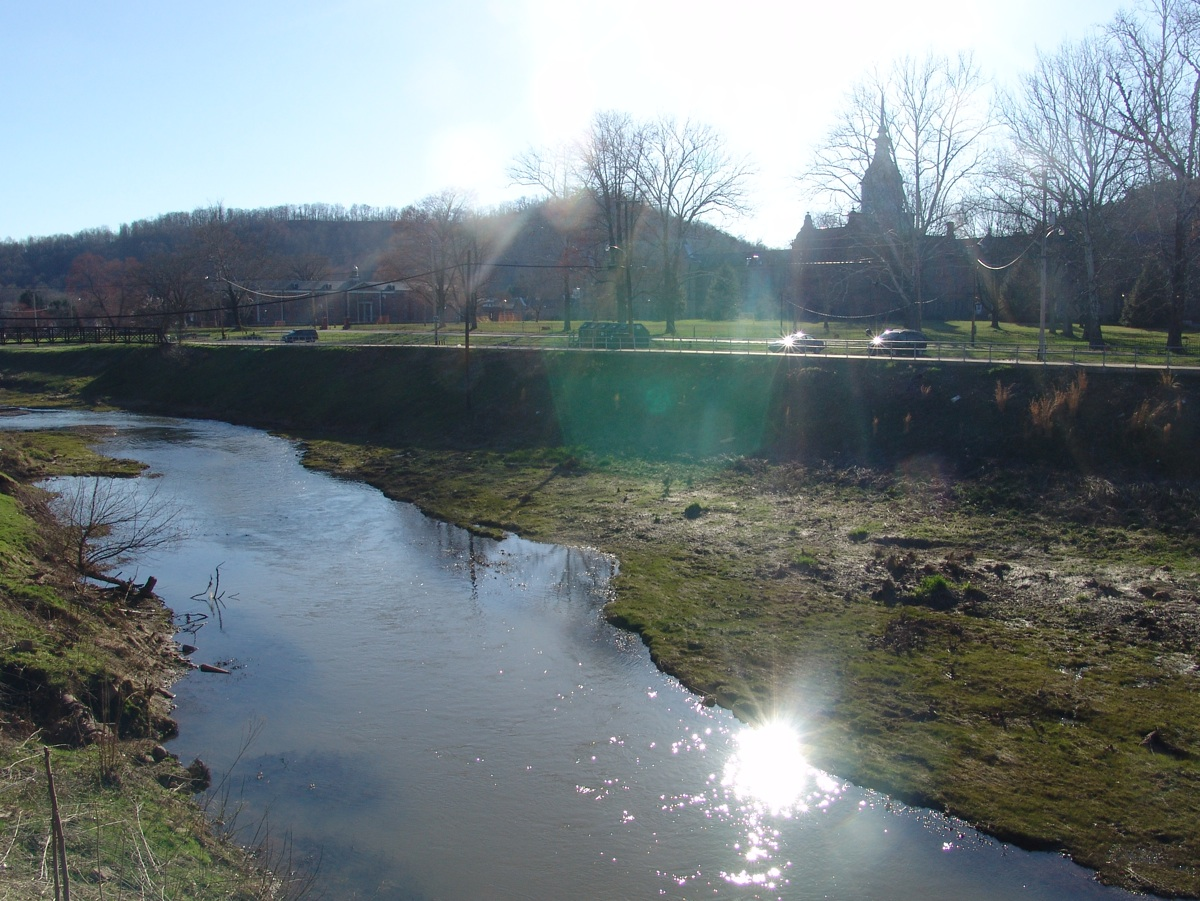
West Fork River - former state hospital in background

- Louis Bennett Jr., World War I flying ace
- William Thomas Bland, congressman
- Charlie Brown, World War II USAAF pilot
- Andrew Edmiston, Jr., congressman
- John William Hamilton, bishop
- Buddy Hayes, musician
- Rush D. Holt, Sr., senator
- Rush D. Holt, Jr., congressman
- Jason Koon, poker player
- Lewis Maxwell, congressman
- Alexander Scott Withers, author
- Fred Wyant, football player
